= Cultural Revolution =

Period of sociopolitical turmoil in China (1966–1976)

- Part of the history of China (1949–1976), the Sino-Soviet split, and the Cold War in Asia
- Propaganda poster depicting Mao Zedong, above a group of soldiers from the People's Liberation Army. The caption reads, "The Chinese People's Liberation Army is the great school of Mao Zedong Thought".
- Duration: 16 May 1966 – 6 October 1976 (10 years and 143 days)
- Location: China
- Motive: Preservation of communism by purging capitalist and traditional elements, and power struggle between Maoists and pragmatists.
- Organized by: Politburo of the Chinese Communist Party; Cultural Revolution Group
- Outcome: Economic activity impaired, historical and cultural material destroyed.
- Deaths: Estimates vary from hundreds of thousands to millions (see § Death toll)
- Property damage: Cemetery of Confucius, Temple of Heaven, Ming tombs
- Arrests: Jiang Qing, Zhang Chunqiao, Yao Wenyuan, and Wang Hongwen

Chinese name
- Chinese: 文化大革命
- Literal meaning: "Great Cultural Revolution"
Transcriptions
Standard Mandarin
- Hanyu Pinyin: Wénhuà dàgémìng
- Bopomofo: ㄨㄣˊ ㄏㄨㄚˋ ㄉㄚˋ ㄍㄜˊ ㄇㄧㄥˋ
- Gwoyeu Romatzyh: Wenhuah dahgerminq
- Wade–Giles: Wen^{2}-hua^{4} ta^{4}-ko^{2}-ming^{4}
- Tongyong Pinyin: Wún-huà dà-gé-mìng
- IPA: [wə̌n.xwâ tâ.kɤ̌.mîŋ]
Wu
- Romanization: Ven^{平}ho^{去} du^{去} keh^{入}min^{去}
Hakka
- Pha̍k-fa-sṳ: Vùn-fa thai-kiet-min
Yue: Cantonese
- Yale Romanization: Màhn-faa daaih-gaak-mihng
- Jyutping: man4 faa3 daai6 gaak3 ming6
- IPA: [mɐn˩ fa˧ taj˨ kak̚˧ mɪŋ˨]
Southern Min
- Hokkien POJ: Bûn-hoà tāi-kek-bēng
Eastern Min
- Fuzhou BUC: Ùng-huá dâi gáik-mêng

Formal name
- Simplified Chinese: 无产阶级文化大革命
- Traditional Chinese: 無產階級文化大革命
- Literal meaning: "Great Proletarian Cultural Revolution"
Transcriptions
Standard Mandarin
- Hanyu Pinyin: Wúchǎnjiējí wénhuà dàgémìng
- Bopomofo: ㄨˊ ㄔㄢˇ ㄐㄧㄝ ㄐㄧˊ ㄨㄣˊ ㄏㄨㄚˋ ㄉㄚˋ ㄍㄜˊ ㄇㄧㄥˋ
- Wade–Giles: Wu^{2}-chʻan^{2}-chieh^{1}-chi^{2} wen^{2}-hua^{4} ta^{4}-ko^{2}-ming^{4}
- Tongyong Pinyin: Wú-chǎn-jie-jí wún-huà dà-gé-mìng
- IPA: [ǔ.ʈʂʰàn.tɕjé.tɕǐ wə̌n.xwâ tâ.kɤ̌.mîŋ]
Wu
- Romanization: Vu^{平}tshae^{上}cia^{平}cih^{入} ven^{平}ho^{去} du^{去} keh^{入}min^{去}
Hakka
- Pha̍k-fa-sṳ: Vû-sán-kiê-kip vùn-fa thai-kiet-min
Yue: Cantonese
- Jyutping: mou4 caan2 gaai1 kap1 man4 faa3 daai6 gaak3 ming6
- IPA: [mɔw˩ tsʰan˧˥ kaj˥ kʰɐp̚˥ mɐn˩ fa˧ taj˨ kak̚˧ mɪŋ˨]
Southern Min
- Hokkien POJ: Bû-sán-kai-kip bûn-hòa tōa kek-bēng
Eastern Min
- Fuzhou BUC: Ù-sāng-găi-ngék ùng-huá dâi gáik-mêng

The Cultural Revolution, formally known as the Great Proletarian Cultural Revolution, was a sociopolitical movement in the People's Republic of China (PRC). It was launched by Mao Zedong, chairman of the Chinese Communist Party, in 1966 and lasted until his death in 1976. Its stated goal was to advance Chinese communism by purging remnants of capitalist and traditional elements from Chinese society and government.

In May 1966, with the help of the Cultural Revolution Group, Mao launched the revolution and said that bourgeois elements had infiltrated the government and society with the aim of restoring capitalism. Mao called on young people to 'Bombard the Headquarters', and proclaimed that "to rebel is justified". Mass upheaval began in Beijing with Red August in 1966. Many young people responded by forming cadres of Red Guards throughout China. Quotations from Chairman Mao Tse-tung became revered within a cult of personality. In 1967, emboldened radicals rebelled and seized power from local governments and party branches, establishing revolutionary committees in their place while smashing public security, procuratorate and judicial systems. These committees often split into factions, precipitating armed clashes among the radicals. After the fall of Lin Biao in 1971, the Gang of Four became influential in 1972, and the revolution continued until Mao's death in 1976, followed by the arrest of the Gang of Four.

The Cultural Revolution was characterized by violence and chaos across Chinese society. Estimates of the death toll vary, ranging from 1 to 2 million, including the Guangxi Massacre that included cannibalism, as well as massacres in Beijing, Inner Mongolia, Guangdong, Yunnan, and Hunan. Red Guards sought to destroy the Four Olds (old ideas, old culture, old customs, and old habits), which often took the form of destroying historical artifacts and cultural and religious sites. Tens of millions were persecuted, including officials such as Liu Shaoqi, Deng Xiaoping and Peng Dehuai; millions were persecuted for being members of the Five Black Categories, with intellectuals and scientists labelled as the Stinking Old Ninth. Schools and universities were closed, and the National College Entrance Examinations were cancelled. Over 10 million youth from urban areas were relocated under the Down to the Countryside Movement.

In 1978, Deng Xiaoping became the paramount leader, replacing Mao's successor Hua Guofeng. Deng and his allies introduced the Boluan Fanzheng program and initiated the reform and opening up, which, together with the New Enlightenment movement, dismantled the ideology of the Cultural Revolution. In 1981, the CCP publicly acknowledged failures of the Cultural Revolution, declaring it "responsible for the most severe setback and the heaviest losses suffered by the people, the country, and the party since the founding of the People's Republic." Memories and perspectives of the Cultural Revolution are varied and complex in contemporary China. It is often referred to as the "ten years of chaos" (十年动乱; shí nián dòngluàn) or "ten years of havoc" (十年浩劫; shí nián hàojié).

== Etymology ==
The terminology of "cultural revolution" appeared in communist party discourses and newspapers prior to the founding of the People's Republic of China. During this period, the term was used interchangeably with "cultural construction" and referred to the elimination of illiteracy in order to widen public participation in civic matters. This usage of "cultural revolution" continued through the 1950s and into the 1960s, and often involved drawing parallels to the May Fourth Movement or the Soviet cultural revolution from 1928 to 1931.

== Background ==
=== Creation of the People's Republic ===
On 1 October 1949, Mao Zedong declared the People's Republic of China, symbolically bringing the decades-long Chinese Civil War to a close. Remaining Nationalist forces fled to Taiwan and continued to resist the People's Republic in various ways. Many soldiers of the Chinese Nationalists were left in mainland China, and, in 1950, Mao Zedong launched the Campaign to Suppress Counterrevolutionaries to eliminate these soldiers left behind, as well as elements of Chinese society viewed as potentially dangerous to Mao's new government.

=== Great Leap Forward ===
The Great Leap Forward was an industrialization campaign within China from 1958 to 1962, initiated by Mao Zedong, chairman of the Chinese Communist Party, whose goal was to transform the country from an agrarian society to an industrialized society through the formation of people's communes. The Great Leap Forward led to between 15 and 55 million deaths in mainland China during the 1959–1961 Great Chinese Famine it caused, making it the largest or second-largest famine in human history.

On 11 January 1962, an enlarged Central Committee work conference of the CCP was held in Beijing. With over 7,000 participants, it became known as the Seven Thousand Cadres Conference. Liu Shaoqi, Mao Zedong, and others made self-criticisms at the conference. Mao said in the conference that, "Any mistakes that the Centre has made ought to be my direct responsibility, and I also have an indirect share in the blame because I am the Chairman of the Central Committee. I don't want other people to shirk their responsibility. There are some other comrades who also bear responsibility, but the person primarily responsible should be me." He continued: "If our country does not establish a socialist economy, what kind of situation shall we be in? We shall become a country like Yugoslavia, which has actually become a bourgeois country." However, "during the whole socialist stage there still exist classes and class struggle, and this class struggle is a protracted, complex, sometimes even violent affair."

After the meeting, Liu informed the others that "The errors of the Great Leap Forward were serious, and this is the first time we've summarized the experience. Every year from now on we need to look back and summarize it again." Regarding the cannibalism during the Great Leap Forward, he also remarked, "This will be memorialized as a decree in which the emperor admits his crimes against the people." After the Seven Thousand Cadres Conference, Mao Zedong took a backseat in economic matters. However, at the Xilou Conference, Liu Shaoqi still believed that the Seven Thousand Cadres Conference had not sufficiently reflected on the Great Leap Forward.

In the first half of 1962, China saw the emergence of a system where individual households were responsible for agricultural output. However, Mao Zedong believed this practice contradicted communism and was something he could not tolerate. In July 1962, Mao Zedong expressed dissatisfaction with Liu Shaoqi, stating: "The Three Red Banners have been refuted, land is being divided up, and you did nothing? What will happen after I die?" Liu Shaoqi also argued that "History will record the role you and I played in the starvation of so many people, and the cannibalism will also be memorialized!"

=== Impact of international tensions and anti-revisionism ===
In the early 1950s, the PRC and the Soviet Union (USSR) were the world's two largest communist states. Although initially they were mutually supportive, disagreements arose after Nikita Khrushchev took power in the USSR. In 1956, Khrushchev denounced his predecessor Josef Stalin and his policies, and began implementing economic reforms. Mao and many other CCP members opposed these changes, believing that they would damage the worldwide communist movement.

Mao believed that Khrushchev was a revisionist, altering Marxist–Leninist concepts, which Mao claimed would give capitalists control of the USSR. Relations soured. The USSR refused to support China's case for joining the United Nations and reneged on its pledge to supply China with a nuclear weapon.

Mao denounced revisionism in April 1960. Without pointing at the USSR, Mao criticized its Balkan ally, the League of Communists of Yugoslavia. In turn, the USSR criticized China's Balkan ally, the Party of Labour of Albania. In 1963, CCP began to denounce the USSR, publishing nine polemics.

Other Soviet actions increased concerns about potential fifth columnists. As a result of the tensions following the Sino-Soviet split, Soviet leaders authorized radio broadcasts into China stating that the Soviet Union would assist "genuine communists" who overthrew Mao and his "erroneous course". Chinese leadership also feared the increasing military conflict between the United States and North Vietnam, concerned that China's support would lead the United States to seek out potential Chinese assets.

Mao contended that capitalist tendencies had begun to grow in China. He viewed the Cultural Revolution as perpetual revolution aimed at opposing "representatives of the bourgeoisie and counterrevolutionary revisionists" who had "sneaked into the party, the government, the army, and cultural circles."

The meaning and nature of revolution was a frequent theme in the speeches of central leadership during the Cultural Revolution. They contended that the Cultural Revolution was an unprecedented event that had to be carried out by the people rather than directed from above and that the best test was revolutionary practice. Tao Zhu stated:

You can't say you are the true revolutionaries and they are fake. This is mass organizing. Their organizations may also be revolutionary. You may have a revolutionary competition. Good ones will grow, bad ones will collapse ... True or fake revolutionaries will be distinguished in revolutionary practice.

=== Socialist Education Movement and Hai Rui Dismissed from Office ===
In 1963, Mao launched the Socialist Education Movement. Mao set the scene by "cleansing" powerful Beijing officials of questionable loyalty. His approach was executed via newspaper articles, internal meetings, and by his network of political allies.

In late 1959, historian and deputy mayor of Beijing Wu Han published a historical drama entitled Hai Rui Dismissed from Office. In the play, an honest civil servant, Hai Rui, is dismissed by a corrupt emperor. While Mao initially praised the play, in February 1965, he secretly commissioned Jiang Qing and Yao Wenyuan to publish an article criticizing it. Yao described the play as an allegory attacking Mao; flagging Mao as the emperor, and Peng Dehuai, who had previously questioned Mao during the Lushan Conference, as the honest civil servant.

Yao's article put Beijing mayor Peng Zhen on the defensive. Peng, Wu Han's direct superior, was the head of the Five Man Group, a committee commissioned by Mao to study the potential for a cultural revolution. Peng Zhen, aware that he would be implicated if Wu indeed wrote an "anti-Mao" play, wished to contain Yao's influence. Yao's article was initially published only in select local newspapers. Peng forbade its publication in the nationally distributed People's Daily and other major newspapers under his control, and not pay heed to Yao's petty politics. While the "literary battle" against Peng raged, Mao fired Yang Shangkun—director of the party's General Office, an organ that controlled internal communications—making unsubstantiated charges. He installed loyalist Wang Dongxing, head of Mao's security detail. Yang's dismissal likely emboldened Mao's allies to move against their factional rivals.

On 12 February 1966, the "Five Man Group" issued a report known as the February Outline. The Outline as sanctioned by the party center defined Hai Rui as a constructive academic discussion and aimed to distance Peng Zhen formally from any political implications. However, Jiang Qing and Yao Wenyuan continued their denunciations. Meanwhile, Mao sacked Propaganda Department director Lu Dingyi, a Peng ally.

Lu's removal gave Maoists unrestricted access to the press. Mao delivered his final blow to Peng at a high-profile Politburo meeting through loyalists Kang Sheng and Chen Boda. They accused Peng of opposing Mao, labeled the February Outline "evidence of Peng Zhen's revisionism", and grouped him with three other disgraced officials as part of the "Peng-Luo-Lu-Yang Anti-Party Clique". On 16 May, the Politburo formalized the decisions by releasing an official document condemning Peng and his "anti-party allies" in the strongest terms, disbanding his "Five Man Group", and replacing it with the Maoist Cultural Revolution Group (CRG).

== 1966: Outbreak ==
The Cultural Revolution can be divided into two main periods:

- spring 1966 to summer 1968 (when most of the key events took place)
- a tailing period that lasted until fall 1976

The early phase was characterized by mass movement and political pluralization. Virtually anyone could create a political organization, even without party approval. Known as Red Guards, these organizations originally arose in schools and universities and later in factories and other institutions. After 1968, most of these organizations ceased to exist, although their legacies were a topic of controversy later.

=== Notification ===
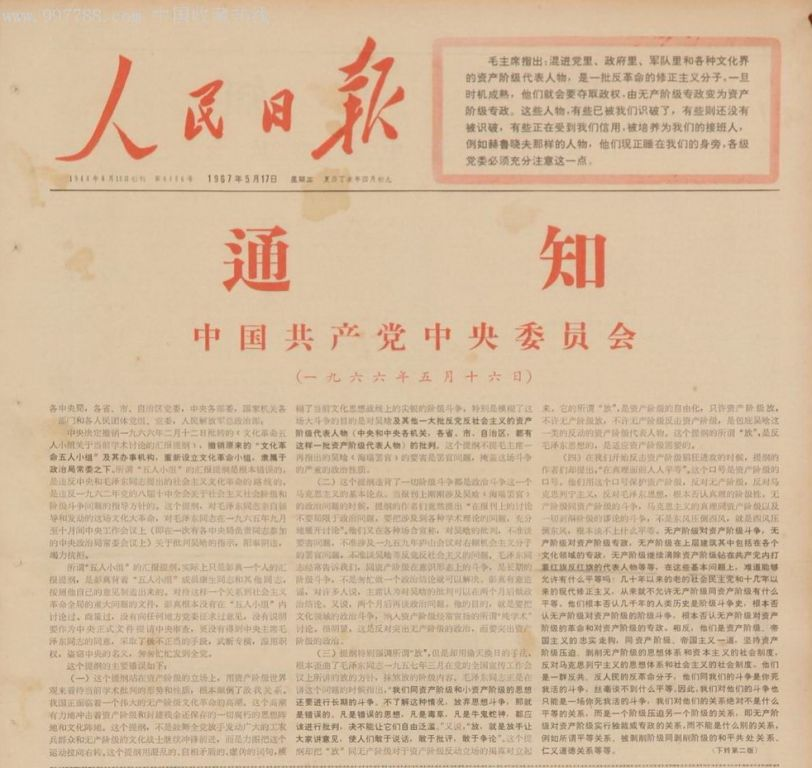
The 16 May Notification

In May 1966, an expanded session of the Politburo was called in Beijing. The conference was laden with Maoist political rhetoric on class struggle and filled with meticulously prepared 'indictments' of recently ousted leaders such as Peng Zhen and Luo Ruiqing. One of these documents, distributed on 16 May, was prepared with Mao's personal supervision and was particularly damning:

Those representatives of the bourgeoisie who have sneaked into the Party, the government, the army, and various spheres of culture are a bunch of counter-revolutionary revisionists. Once conditions are ripe, they will seize political power and turn the dictatorship of the proletariat into a dictatorship of the bourgeoisie. Some of them we have already seen through; others we have not. Some are still trusted by us and are being trained as our successors, persons like Khrushchev for example, who are still nestling beside us.

Later known as the "16 May Notification", this document summarized Mao's ideological justification for CR. Initially kept secret, distributed only among high-ranking party members, it was later declassified and published in People's Daily on 17 May 1967. Effectively it implied that enemies of the Communist cause could be found within the Party: class enemies who "wave the red flag to oppose the red flag." The only way to identify these people was through "the telescope and microscope of Mao Zedong Thought." While the party leadership was relatively united in approving Mao's agenda, many Politburo members were not enthusiastic, or simply confused about the direction. The charges against party leaders such as Peng disturbed China's intellectual community and the eight non-Communist parties.

=== Mass rallies (May–June) ===
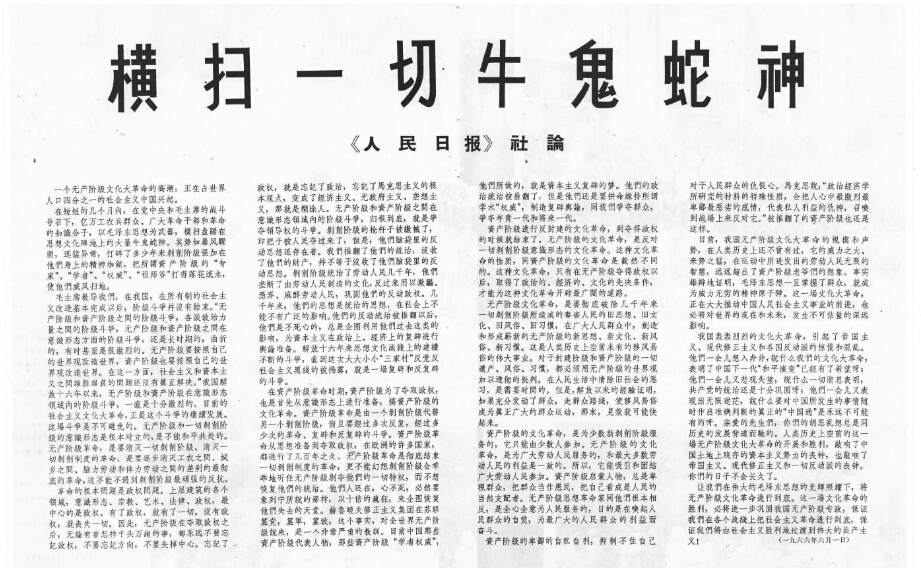
"Sweep Away All Cow Demons and Snake Spirits", an editorial published on the front page of People's Daily on 1 June 1966, calling for the proletariat to "completely eradicate" the "Four Olds [...] that have poisoned the people of China for thousands of years, fostered by the exploiting classes".

After the purge of Peng Zhen, the Beijing Party Committee effectively ceased to function, paving the way for disorder in the capital. On 25 May, under the guidance of Cao Yi'ou—wife of Mao loyalist Kang Sheng—Nie Yuanzi, a philosophy lecturer at Peking University, authored a big-character poster along with other leftists and posted it to a public bulletin. Nie attacked the university's party administration and its leader Lu Ping. Nie insinuated that the university leadership, much like Peng, were trying to contain revolutionary fervor in a "sinister" attempt to oppose the party and advance revisionism.

Mao promptly endorsed Nie's poster as "the first Marxist big-character poster in China". Approved by Mao, the poster rippled across educational institutions. Students began to revolt against their school's party establishments. Classes were cancelled in Beijing primary and secondary schools, followed by a decision on 13 June to expand the class suspension nationwide. By early June, throngs of young demonstrators lined the capital's major thoroughfares holding giant portraits of Mao, beating drums, and shouting slogans.

When the dismissal of Peng and the municipal party leadership became public in early June, confusion was widespread. The public and foreign missions were kept in the dark on the reason for Peng's ousting. Top Party leadership was caught off guard by the sudden protest wave and struggled with how to respond. After seeking Mao's guidance in Hangzhou, Liu Shaoqi and Deng Xiaoping decided to send in 'work teams'—effectively 'ideological guidance' squads of cadres—to the city's schools and People's Daily to restore some semblance of order and re-establish party control.

The work teams had a poor understanding of student sentiment. Unlike the political movement of the 1950s that squarely targeted intellectuals, the new movement was focused on established party cadres, many of whom were part of the work teams. As a result, the work teams came under increasing suspicion as thwarting revolutionary fervor. Party leadership subsequently became divided over whether or not work teams should continue. Liu Shaoqi insisted on continuing work-team involvement and suppressing the movement's most radical elements, fearing that the movement would spin out of control.

=== Bombard the Headquarters (July) ===
Mao–Liu conflict
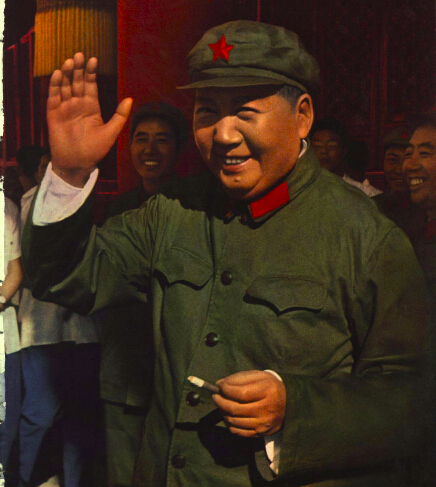
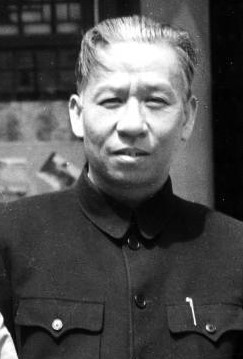
In 1966, Mao broke with Liu Shaoqi (right), then serving as President, over the work-teams issue. Mao's polemic Bombard the Headquarters was widely recognized as targeting Liu, the purported "bourgeois" party headquarters

In July, Mao, in Wuhan, crossed the Yangtze River, showing his vigor. He then returned from Wuhan to Beijing and criticized party leadership for its handling of the work-teams issue. Mao accused the work teams of undermining the student movement, calling for their full withdrawal on 24 July. Several days later a rally was held at the Great Hall of the People to announce the decision and reveal the tone of the movement to teachers and students. At the rally, Party leaders encouraged the masses to 'not be afraid' and take charge of the movement, free of Party interference.

The work-teams issue marked a decisive defeat for Liu; it also signaled that disagreement over how to handle the CR's unfolding events would irreversibly split Mao from the party leadership. On 1 August, the Eleventh Plenum of the 8th Central Committee was convened to advance Mao's radical agenda. At the plenum, Mao showed disdain for Liu, repeatedly interrupting him as he delivered his opening day speech.

Red Guards in Beijing
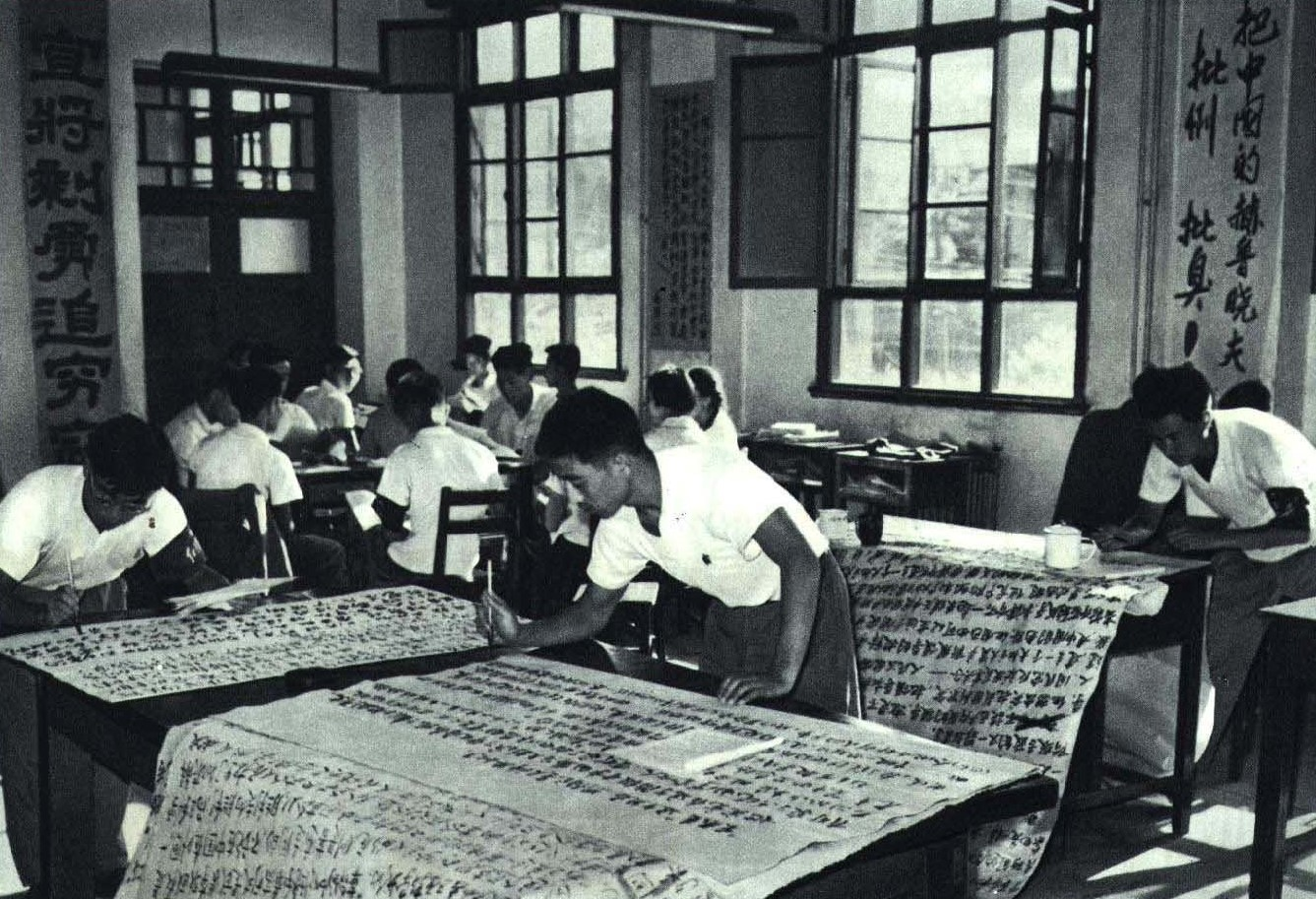
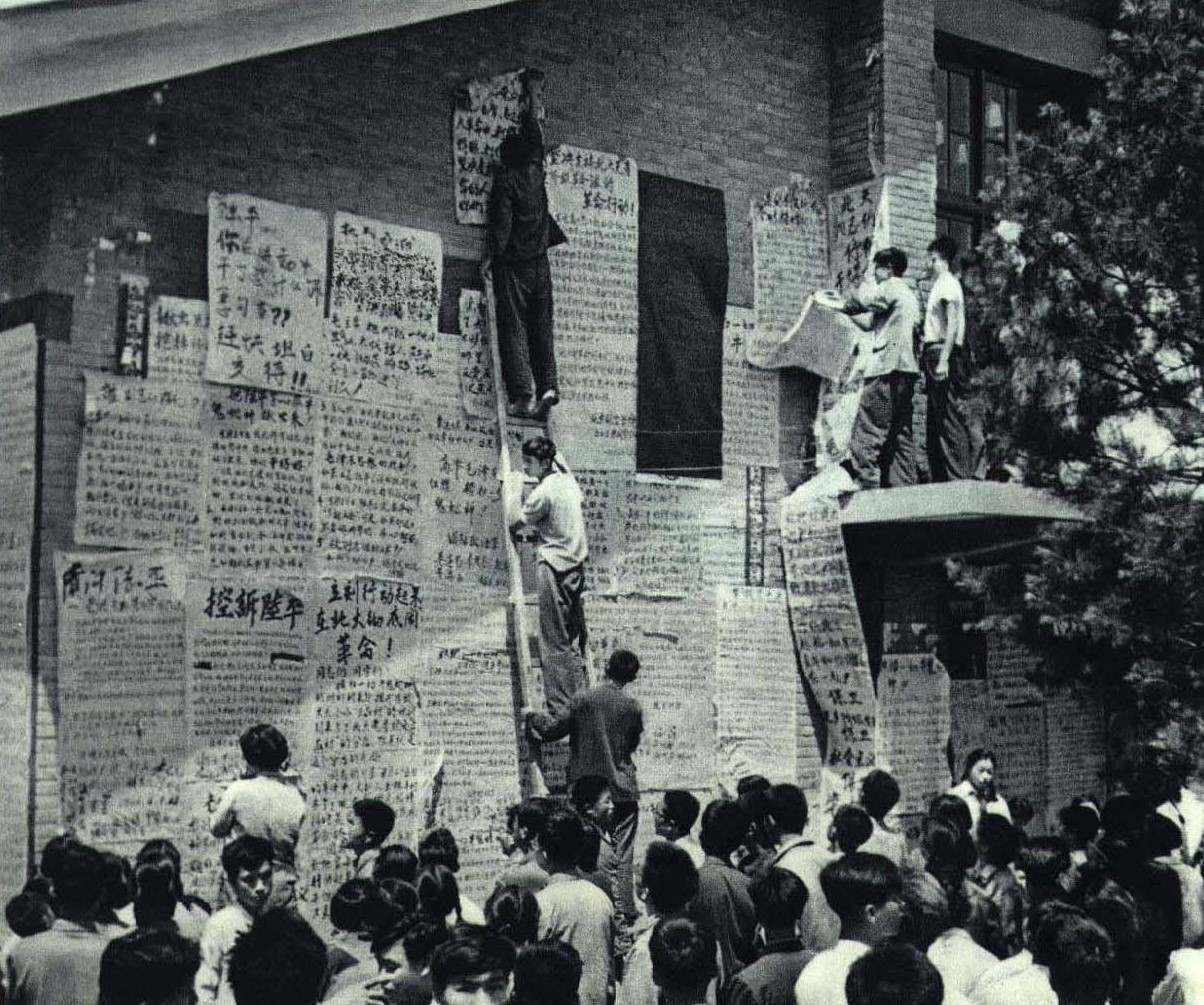
From left: (1) Students at Beijing Normal University making big-character posters denouncing Liu Shaoqi; (2) Big-characters posted at Peking University; (3) Students at No. 23 Middle School in Beijing reading People's Daily during the "Resume Classes" campaign

On 28 July, Red Guard representatives wrote to Mao, calling for rebellion and upheaval to safeguard the revolution. Mao then responded to the letters by writing his own big-character poster entitled Bombard the Headquarters, rallying people to target the "command centre (i.e., Headquarters) of counterrevolution." Mao wrote that despite having undergone a communist revolution, a "bourgeois" elite was still thriving in "positions of authority" in the government and Party.

This statement has been interpreted as a direct indictment of the party establishment under Liu and Deng—the purported "bourgeois headquarters" of China. The personnel changes at the Plenum reflected a radical re-design of the party hierarchy. Liu and Deng kept their seats on the Politburo Standing Committee, but were sidelined from day-to-day party affairs. Lin Biao was elevated to become the CCP's number-two; Liu's rank went from second to eighth and was no longer Mao's heir apparent.

Along with the top leadership losing power the entire national Party bureaucracy was purged. The extensive Organization Department, in charge of party personnel, virtually ceased to exist. The top officials in the Propaganda Department were sacked, with many of its functions folded into the CRG.

=== Red August and the Sixteen Points ===
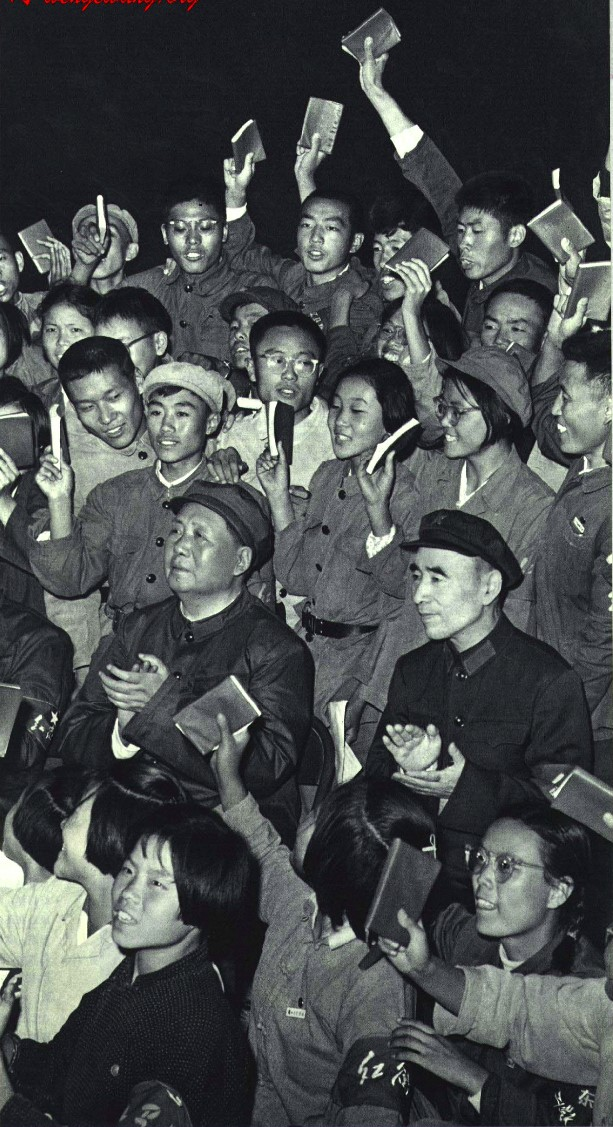
Mao and Lin Biao surrounded by rallying Red Guards in Beijing, December 1966

Quotations from Chairman Mao Tse-tung led the Red Guards to commit to their objective as China's future. By December 1967, 350 million copies had been printed.

On 1 August 1966, the rights of teachers and students to form "mass organizations of the Cultural Revolution" were officially declared.

During the Red August of Beijing, on 8 August 1966, the party's General Committee passed its "Decision Concerning the Great Proletarian Cultural Revolution," later to be known as the "Sixteen Points". This decision defined the Cultural Revolution as "a great revolution that touches people to their very souls and constitutes a new stage in the development of the socialist revolution in our country:"

Although the bourgeoisie has been overthrown, it is still trying to use the old ideas, culture, customs and habits of the exploiting classes to corrupt the masses, capture their minds and endeavour to stage a comeback. The proletariat must do the exact opposite: it must meet head-on every challenge of the bourgeoisie ... to change the mental outlook of the whole of society. At present, our objective is to struggle against and overthrow those persons in authority who are taking the capitalist road, to criticize and repudiate the reactionary bourgeois academic "authorities" and the ideology of the bourgeoisie and all other exploiting classes and to transform education, literature and art and all other parts of the superstructure not in correspondence with the socialist economic base, so as to facilitate the consolidation and development of the socialist system.

The implications of the Sixteen Points were far-reaching. It elevated what was previously a student movement to a nationwide mass campaign that would galvanize workers, farmers, soldiers and lower-level party functionaries to rise, challenge authority, and re-shape the superstructure of society.

On 18 August in Beijing, over a million Red Guards from across the country gathered in and around Tiananmen Square for an audience with the chairman. Mao mingled with Red Guards and encouraged them, donning a Red Guard armband. Lin also took centre stage, denouncing perceived enemies in society that were impeding the "progress of the revolution". Subsequently, violence escalated in Beijing and quickly spread. The 18 August rally was filmed and shown to approximately 100 million people in its first month of release.

On 22 August, a central directive was issued to prevent police intervention in Red Guard activities, and those in the police force who defied this notice were labeled counter-revolutionaries. Central officials lifted restraints on violent behavior. Xie Fuzhi, the national police chief, often pardoned Red Guards for their "crimes".

The campaign included incidents of torture, murder, and public humiliation. Many people who were indicted as counter-revolutionaries died by suicide. During Red August, 1,772 people were murdered in Beijing; many of the victims were teachers who were attacked or killed by their own students. In September, Shanghai experienced 704 suicides and 534 deaths; in Wuhan, 62 suicides and 32 murders occurred during the same period. Peng Dehuai was brought to Beijing to be publicly ridiculed.

=== Destruction of the Four Olds (August–November) ===
Between August and November 1966, eight mass rallies were held, drawing in 12 million people, most of whom were Red Guards. To aid Red Guards in traveling, the Great Exchange of Revolutionary Experience program, which lasted from September 1966 to early 1967, gave them free food and lodging throughout the country.

At the rallies, Lin Biao called for the destruction of the Four Olds; namely, old customs, culture, habits, and ideas. Some changes associated with the Four Olds campaign were mainly benign, such as assigning new names to city streets, places, and even people; millions of babies were born with "revolutionary" names.

Other aspects were more destructive, particularly in the realms of culture and religion. Historical sites throughout the country were destroyed. The damage was particularly pronounced in the capital, Beijing. Red Guards laid siege to the Temple of Confucius in Qufu, and other historically significant tombs and artifacts.

Libraries of historical and foreign texts were destroyed; books were burned. Temples, churches, mosques, monasteries, and cemeteries were closed and sometimes converted to other uses, or looted and destroyed. Marxist propaganda depicted Buddhism as superstition, and religion was looked upon as a means of hostile foreign infiltration, as well as an instrument of the ruling class. Clergy were arrested and sent to camps; many Tibetan Buddhists were forced to participate in the destruction of their monasteries at gunpoint.

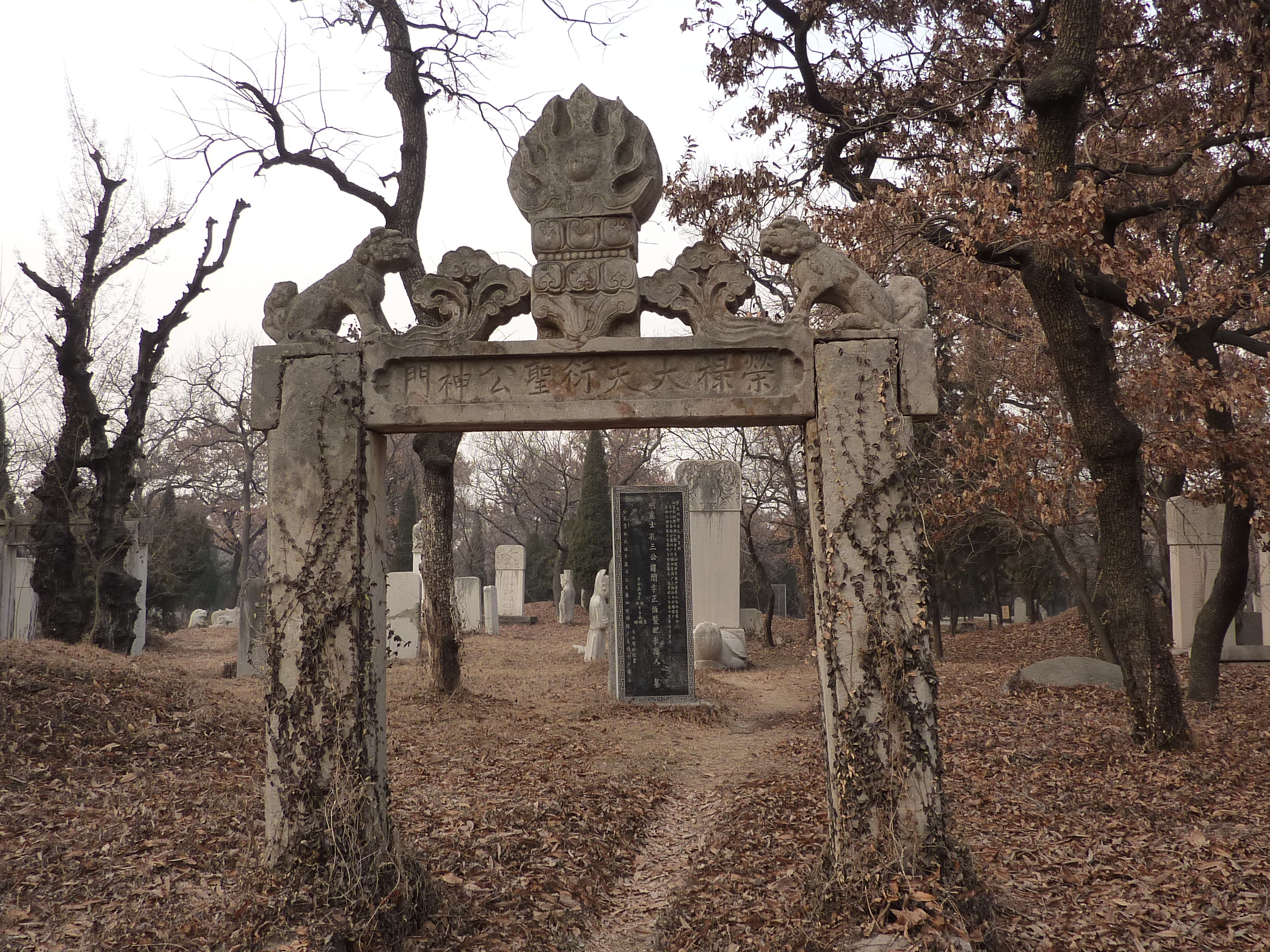
The cemetery of Confucius was attacked by Red Guards in November 1966.

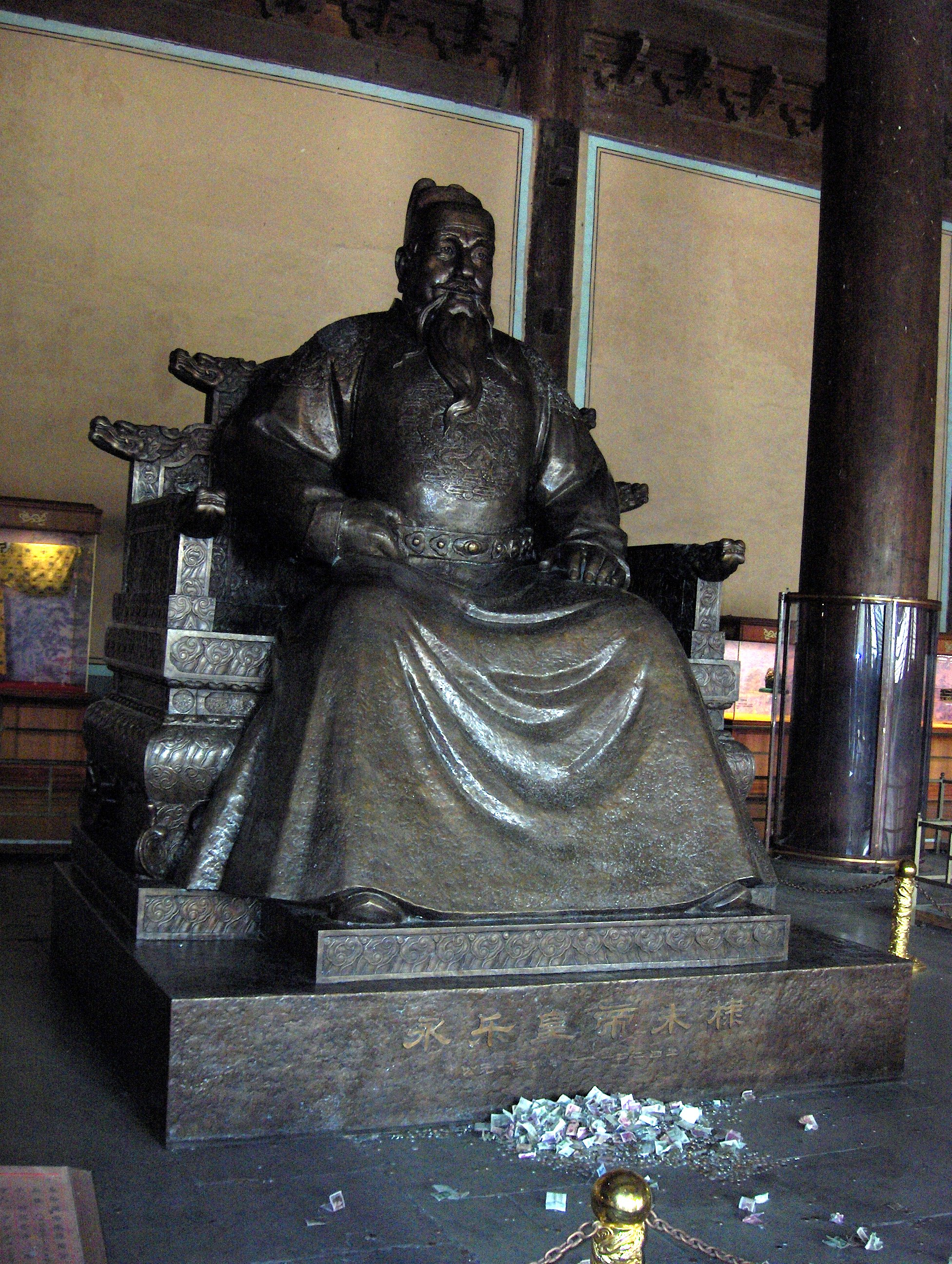
This statue of the Yongle Emperor was originally carved in stone, and was destroyed in the Cultural Revolution. A metal replica is in its place.

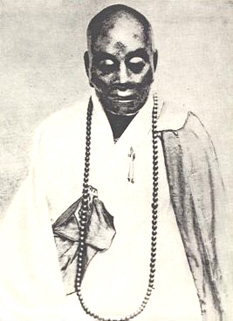
The remains of the 8th century Buddhist monk Huineng were attacked during the Cultural Revolution.

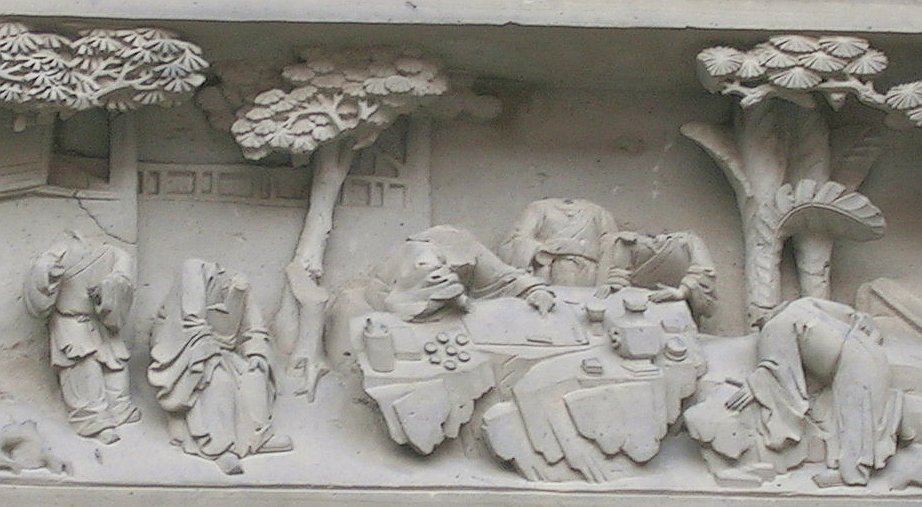
A frieze damaged during the Cultural Revolution, originally from a garden house of a rich imperial official in Suzhou.

In September 1966, central Party authorities under Zhou Enlai issued the Instructions on Grasping Revolution, Promoting Production, which directed that "one must grasp revolution on one hand and promote production on the other hand.

=== Central Work Conference (October) ===
In October 1966, Mao convened a Central Work Conference, mostly to enlist party leaders who had not yet adopted the latest ideology. Liu and Deng were prosecuted and begrudgingly offered self-criticism. After the conference, Liu, once a powerful moderate pundit, was placed under house arrest, then sent to a detention camp, where he was denied medical treatment and died in 1969. Deng was sent away for a period of re-education three times and was eventually sent to work in an engine factory in Jiangxi. Rebellion by party cadres accelerated after the conference.

=== End of the year ===
On 5 October, the Central Military Commission and the PLA's Department of General Political Tasks directed military academies to dismiss their classes to allow cadets to become more involved in the Cultural Revolution. In doing so, they were acting on Lin Biao's 23 August 1966 for "three month turmoil" in the PLA.

In Macau, rioting broke out during the 12-3 incident. The event was prompted by the colonial government's delays in approving a new wing for a CCP elementary school in Taipa. The school board illegally began construction, but the colonial government sent police to stop the workers. Several people were injured in the resulting melee. On 3 December 1966, two days of rioting occurred in which hundreds were injured and six to eight were killed, leading to a total clampdown by the Portuguese government. The event set in motion Portugal's de facto abdication of control over Macau, putting Macau on the path to eventual absorption by China.

By the beginning of 1967, a wide variety of grassroots political organizations had formed. Beyond Red Guard and student rebel groups, these included poor peasant associations, workers' pickets, and Mao Zedong Thought study societies, among others. Communist Party leaders encouraged these groups to "join up", and these groups joined various coalitions and held various cross-group congresses and assemblies.

== 1967: Seizure of power ==
Mass organizations coalesced into two factions, the radicals who backed Mao's purge of the Communist party, and the conservatives who backed the moderate party establishment. The "support the left" policy was established in January 1967. Mao's policy was to support the rebels; it required the PLA to support "the broad masses of the revolutionary leftists in their struggle to seize power."

In March 1967, the policy was adapted into the "Three Supports and Two Militaries" initiative, in which PLA troops were sent to schools and work units to stabilize political tumult and end factional warfare. The three "Supports" were to "support the left", "support the interior", "support industry". The "two Militaries" referred to "military management" and "military training". The policy of supporting the left failed to define "leftists" when almost all mass organizations claimed to be "leftist" or "revolutionary". PLA commanders had developed close working relations with the party establishment, leading many military units to repress radicals.

Spurred by the events in Beijing, power seizure groups formed across China and expanded into factories and the countryside. In Shanghai, a factory worker named Wang Hongwen organized a far-reaching revolutionary coalition, one that displaced existing Red Guard groups. In January 1967, with support from CRG heavyweights Zhang Chunqiao and Yao Wenyuan, the group of firebrand activists overthrew the Shanghai municipal government under Chen Pixian in what became known as the January Storm, and formed in its place the Shanghai People's Commune. Mao expressed his approval.

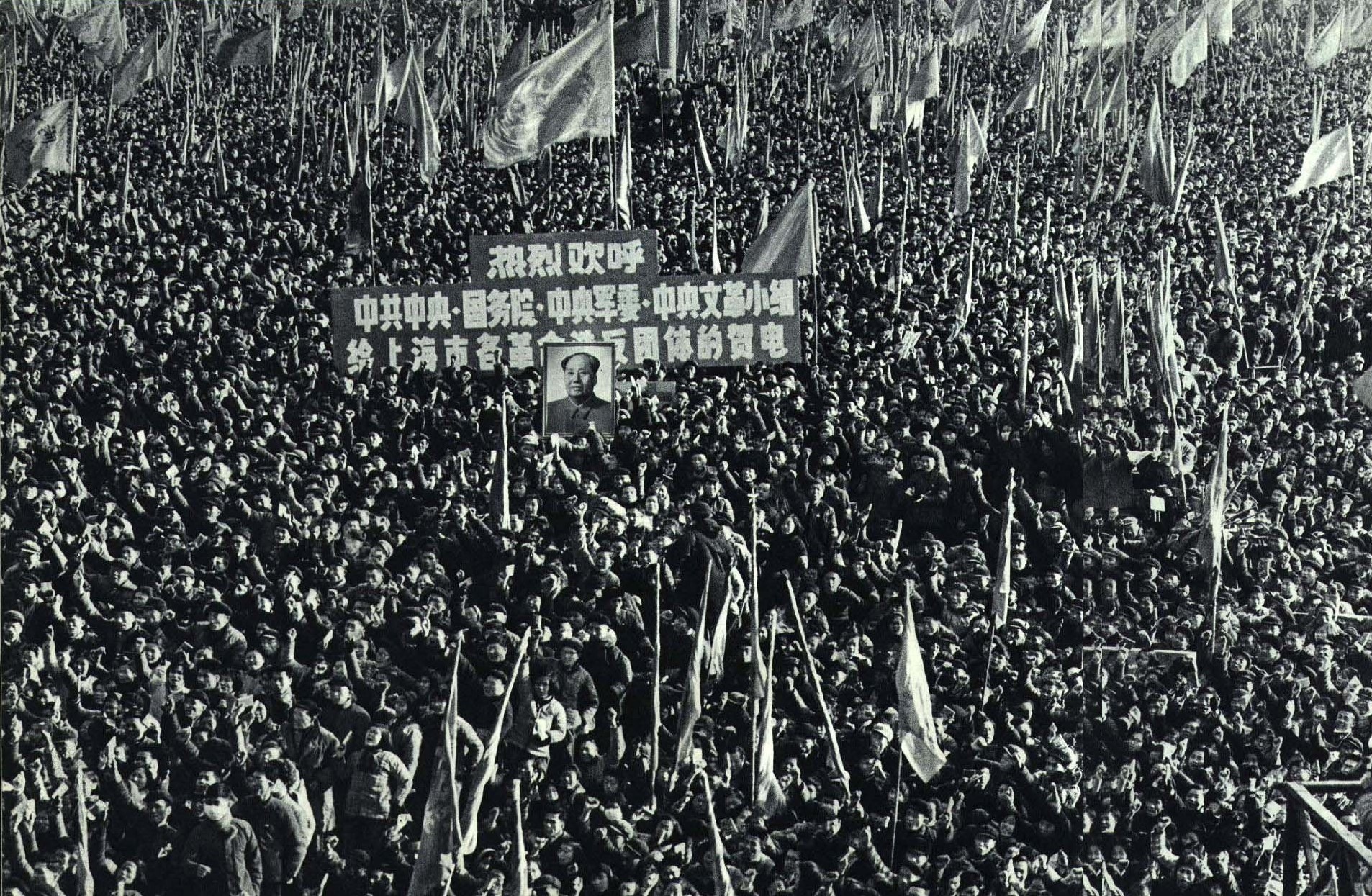
Rebel factions of Red Guards marching in Shanghai, 1967

Shanghai's was the first provincial level government overthrown. Provincial governments and many parts of the state and party bureaucracy were affected, with power seizures taking place. In the next three weeks, 24 more province-level governments were overthrown. "Revolutionary committees" were established, in place of local governments and branches of the Communist Party. In Beijing, three separate revolutionary groups declared power seizures on the same day. In Heilongjiang, local party secretary Pan Fusheng seized power from the party organization under his own leadership. Some leaders even wrote to the CRG asking to be overthrown.

In Beijing, Jiang Qing and Zhang Chunqiao targeted Vice-Premier Tao Zhu. The power-seizure movement appeared in the military as well. In February, prominent generals Ye Jianying and Chen Yi, as well as Vice-Premier Tan Zhenlin, vocally asserted their opposition to the extreme aspects of the movement, with some party elders insinuating that the CRG's real motives were to remove the revolutionary old guard. Mao, initially ambivalent, took to the Politburo floor on 18 February to denounce the opposition directly, endorsing the radicals' activities. This resistance was branded the February Countercurrent—effectively silencing critics within the party.

Although in early 1967 popular insurgencies were limited outside the biggest cities, local governments began collapsing across China. Revolutionaries dismantled ruling government and party organizations. Because power seizures lacked centralized leadership, it was no longer clear who believed in Mao's revolutionary vision and who was exploiting the chaos for their gain. The formation of rival revolutionary groups and manifestations of long-established local feuds led to violent struggles between factions.

Tension grew between mass organizations and the military. In response, Lin Biao issued a directive for the army to aid the radicals. At the same time, the army took control of some provinces and locales that were deemed incapable of handling the power transition. In Wuhan, as in many other cities, two revolutionary organizations emerged, one supporting and one attacking the conservative establishment. Chen Zaidao, the general in charge of the area, forcibly repressed the anti-establishment demonstrators. Mao flew to Wuhan with an entourage of central officials in an attempt to secure military loyalty in the area. On 20 July 1967, local agitators in response kidnapped Mao's emissary Wang Li, in what became known as the Wuhan Incident. Chen was sent to Beijing and tried by Jiang Qing and the rest of the CRG. Chen's resistance was the last major open display of opposition within the PLA.

The Gang of Four's Zhang Chunqiao admitted that the most crucial factor in the Cultural Revolution was not the Red Guards, the CRG or the "rebel worker" organisations, but the PLA. When the PLA local garrison supported Mao's radicals, they were able to take over local government successfully, but if they were uncooperative, the takeovers were unsuccessful. Violent clashes occurred in virtually all major cities. In 1967 and 1968, rebel groups supported by the PLA established Revolutionary Committees that replaced government and Party organizations at the local and provincial levels.

In response to the Wuhan Incident, Mao and Jiang began establishing a "workers' armed self-defense force", a "revolutionary armed force of mass character" to counter what he saw as rightism in "75% of the PLA officer corps". Meanwhile, a massive movement to "smash gong-jian-fa", to smash the Police, Procuratorate and Court, was carried out in China. The few remaining going-jian-fa organizations were later placed under military control.

Some locations of armed conflict between rebel factions during the summer of 1967.

In Chongqing, factional violence was particularly pronounced. Violence there was exacerbated because the city had a concentration of munitions factories. Violence in Chongqing occurred primarily between two different rebel factions during the period May 1967 to October 1968. Among the major instances of combat was the 25 July Incident in 1967, during which members of one rebel faction attacked four hundred members of other factions using knives, pistols, rifles, submachine guns, and machine guns, killing ten.

Unconventional weapons, including weapon of mass destruction, were seized, but not directly used. Citizens wrote letters to the Zhongnanhai residence of government leaders, warning of attacks on facilities that stored pathogenic bacteria, poisonous plant samples, radioactive substances, poison gas, toxicants, and other dangerous substances. In Changchun, rebels working in geological institutes developed and tested a dirty bomb, a crude radiological weapon, testing two "radioactive self-defense bombs" and two "radioactive self-defense mines".

Violence in 1967 disrupted economic activity and touring Red Guards overburdened China's transportation system. By year end, national industrial output had decreased by 14% from the previous year. Military control was imposed over the Daqing Oil Field in March 1967 and over the Anshan Iron and Steel Plant in August.

Nationwide, a total of 18.8 million firearms, 14,828 artillery pieces, 2,719,545 grenades ended up in civilian hands. They were used in violent struggles, which mostly took place from 1967 to 1968. In Chongqing, Xiamen, and Changchun, tanks, armored vehicles and even warships were deployed in combat.

During the Cultural Revolution, Mao emphasized the need to improve medical care in rural China. The Rural Cooperative Medical System (RCMS) developed in the late 1960s. Each large production brigade established a medical cooperative station staffed by barefoot doctors. The cooperative stations provided primary health care. Barefoot doctors brought healthcare to rural areas where urban-trained doctors would not settle. They promoted basic hygiene, preventive healthcare, and family planning and treated common illnesses. Immunizations were provided free of charge. Public healthcare was highly effective in curbing infectious diseases in rural China. For treatment of major diseases, rural people traveled to state-owned hospitals.

== 1968: Purges ==
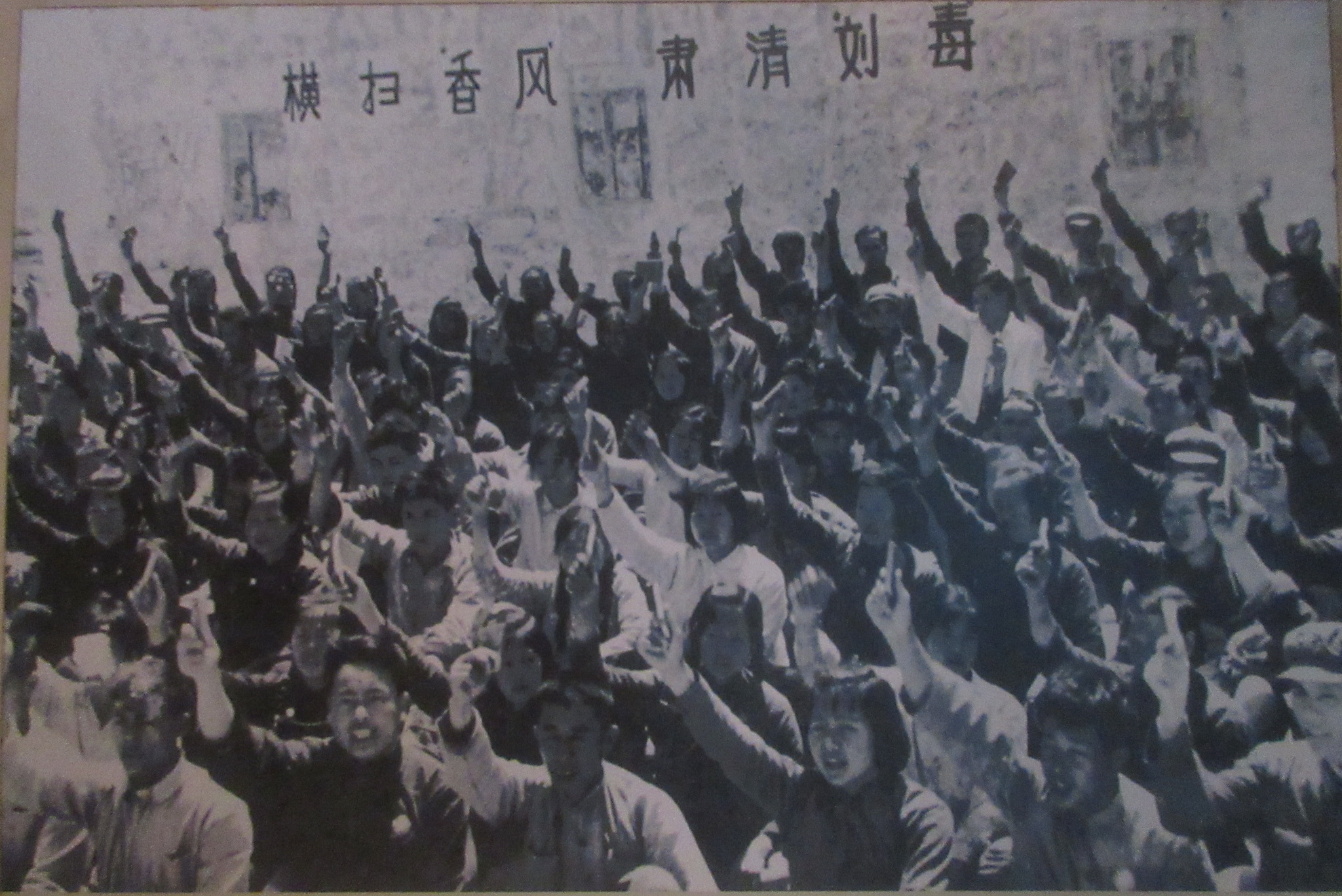
A rally in opposition to Liu Shaoqi

In May 1968, Mao launched a massive political purge. Many people were sent to the countryside to work in reeducation camps. Generally, the campaign targeted rebels from the CR's earlier, more populist, phase. On 27 July, the Red Guards' power over the PLA was officially ended, and the establishment sent in units to besiege areas that remained untouched by the Guards. A year later, the Red Guard factions were dismantled entirely; Mao predicted that the chaos might begin running its own agenda and be tempted to turn against revolutionary ideology. Their purpose had been largely fulfilled; Mao and his radical colleagues had largely overturned established power.

Liu was expelled from the CCP at the 12th Plenum of the 8th Central Committee in September, and labelled the "headquarters of the bourgeoisie".

=== Mao meets with Red Guard leaders (July) ===
As the Red Guard movement had waned over the preceding year, violence by the remaining Red Guards increased on some Beijing campuses. Violence was particularly pronounced at Tsinghua University, where a few thousand hardliners of two factions continued to fight. At Mao's initiative, on 27 July 1968, tens of thousands of workers entered the Tsinghua campus shouting slogans in opposition to the violence. Red Guards attacked the workers, who remained peaceful. Ultimately, the workers disarmed the students and occupied the campus.

On 28 July, Mao and the Central Group met with the five most important remaining Beijing Red Guard leaders to address the movement's excessive violence and political exhaustion. It was the only time during the Cultural Revolution that Mao met and addressed the student leaders directly. In response to a Red Guard leader's telegram sent prior to the meeting, which claimed that some "Black Hand" had maneuvered the workers against the Red Guards, Mao told the student leaders, "The Black Hand is nobody else but me! ... I asked [the workers] how to solve the armed fighting in the universities, and told them to go there to have a look."

During the meeting, Mao and the Central Group for the Cultural Revolution stated, "[W]e want cultural struggle, we do not want armed struggle" and "The masses do not want civil war."

You have been involved in the Cultural Revolution for two years: struggle-criticism-transformation. Now, first, you're not struggling; second, you're not criticizing; and third, you're not transforming. Or rather, you are struggling, but it's an armed struggle. The people are not happy, the workers are not happy, city residents are not happy, most people in schools are not happy, most of the students even in your schools are not happy. Even within the faction that supports you, there are unhappy people. Is this the way to unify the world?

=== Mao's cult of personality and "mango fever" (August) ===
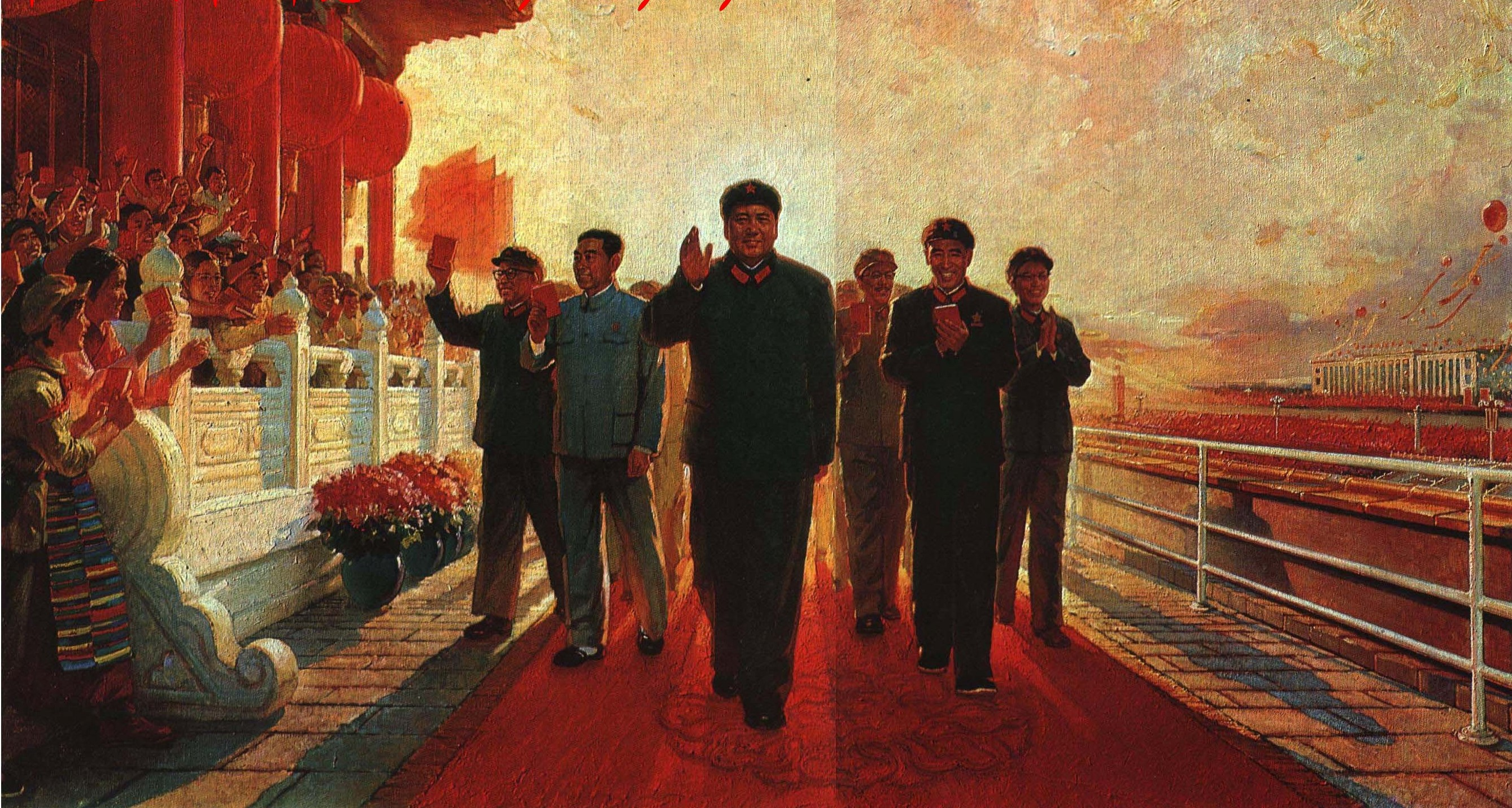
A propaganda oil painting of Mao during the Cultural Revolution (1967)

In the spring of 1968, a massive campaign aimed at enhancing Mao's reputation began. On 4 August, Mao was presented with mangoes by the Pakistani foreign minister Syed Sharifuddin Pirzada, in an apparent diplomatic gesture. Mao had his aide send the box of mangoes to his propaganda team at Tsinghua University on 5 August, who were stationed there to quiet strife among Red Guard factions.

Several months of "mango fever" followed as the fruit became a focus of a "boundless loyalty" campaign for Mao. More replica mangoes were created, and the replicas were sent on tour around Beijing and elsewhere. Many revolutionary committees visited the mangoes in Beijing from outlying provinces. Approximately half a million people greeted the replicas when they arrived in Chengdu. Badges and wall posters featuring the mangoes and Mao were produced in the millions.

The fruit was shared among all institutions that had been a part of the propaganda team, and large processions were organized in support of the "precious gift", as the mangoes were known.

It has been claimed that Mao used the mangoes to express support for the workers who would go to whatever lengths necessary to end the factional fighting among students, and a "prime example of Mao's strategy of symbolic support." Through early 1969, participants of Mao Zedong Thought study classes in Beijing returned with mass-produced mango facsimiles, gaining media attention in the provinces.

=== Down to the Countryside Movement (December) ===
In December 1968, Mao began the Down to the Countryside Movement. During this movement, which lasted for the following decade, young bourgeoisie living in cities were ordered to go to the countryside to experience working life. The term "young intellectuals" was used to refer to recent college graduates. In the late 1970s, these students returned to their home cities. Many students who were previously Red Guard supported the movement and Mao's vision. This movement was thus in part a means of moving Red Guards from the cities to the countryside, where they would cause less social disruption. It also served to spread revolutionary ideology geographically.

== 1969–1971: Lin Biao ==
The 9th National Congress was held in April 1969. It served as a means to "revitalize" the party with fresh thinking—as well as new cadres, after much of the old guard had been destroyed in the struggles of the preceding years. The party framework established two decades earlier broke down almost entirely: rather than through an election by party members, delegates for this Congress were effectively selected by Revolutionary Committees. Representation of the military increased by a large margin from the previous Congress, reflected in the election of more PLA members to the new Central Committee—over 28%. Many officers now elevated to senior positions were loyal to PLA Marshal Lin Biao, which would open a new rift between the military and civilian leadership.

We do not only feel boundless joy because we have as our great leader the greatest Marxist–Leninist of our era, Chairman Mao, but also great joy because we have Vice Chairman Lin as Chairman Mao's universally recognized successor.

— Premier Zhou Enlai at the 9th Party Congress

Reflecting this, Lin was officially elevated to become the Party's preeminent figure outside of Mao, with his name written into the party constitution as his "closest comrade-in-arms" and "universally recognized successor". At the time, no other Communist parties or governments anywhere in the world had adopted the practice of enshrining a successor to the current leader into their constitutions. Lin delivered the keynote address at the Congress: a document drafted by hardliner leftists Yao Wenyuan and Zhang Chunqiao under Mao's guidance.

The report was heavily critical of Liu Shaoqi and other "counter-revolutionaries" and drew extensively from quotations in the Little Red Book. The Congress solidified the central role of Maoism within the party, re-introducing Maoism as the official guiding ideology in the party constitution. The Congress elected a new Politburo with Mao, Lin, Chen, Zhou Enlai and Kang as the members of the new Politburo Standing Committee.

Lin, Chen, and Kang were all beneficiaries of the Cultural Revolution. Zhou, who was demoted in rank, voiced his unequivocal support for Lin at the Congress. Mao restored the function of some formal party institutions, such as the operations of the Politburo, which ceased functioning between 1966 and 1968 because the CCRG held de facto control.

In early 1970, the nationwide "One Strike-Three Anti Campaign" was launched by Mao and the Communist Party Central, aiming to consolidate the new organs of power by targeting counterrevolutionary thoughts and actions. A large number of "minor criminals" were executed or forced to commit suicide between 1970 and 1972. According to government statistics released after the Cultural Revolution, during the campaign 1.87 million people were persecuted as traitors, spies, and counterrevolutionaries, and over 284,800 were arrested or killed from February to November 1970 alone.

=== PLA encroachment ===
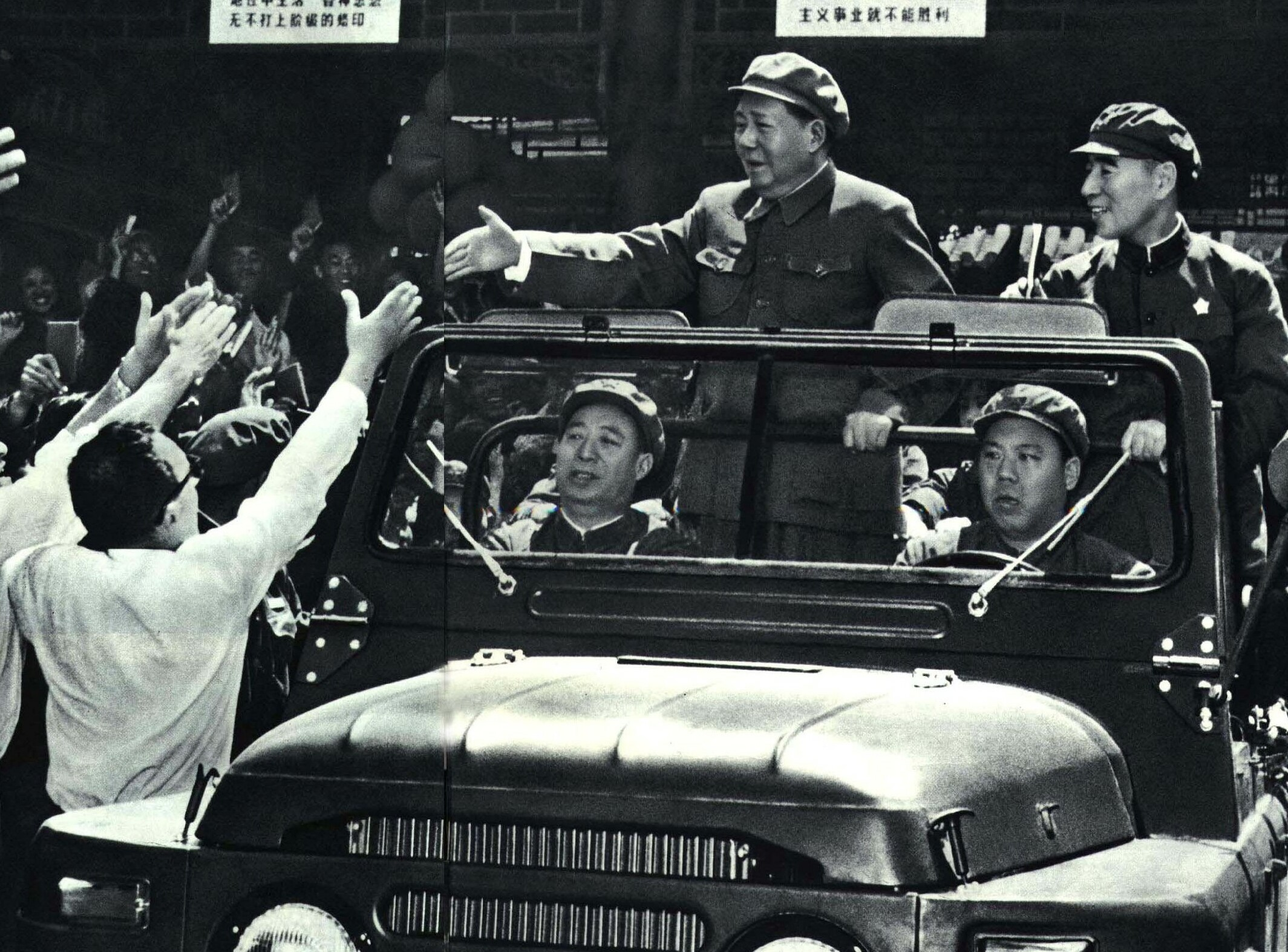
Mao (left) and Lin (right) in 1967, riding in the back of a vehicle during an International Workers' Day parade

Mao's efforts at re-organizing party and state institutions generated mixed results. The situation in some of the provinces remained volatile, even as the political situation in Beijing stabilized. Factional struggles, many violent, continued at a local level despite the declaration that the 9th National Congress marked a temporary victory for the CR. Furthermore, despite Mao's efforts to put on a show of unity at the Congress, the factional divide between Lin's PLA camp and the Jiang-led radical camp was intensifying. Indeed, a personal dislike of Jiang drew many civilian leaders, including Chen, closer to Lin.

Between 1966 and 1968, China was isolated internationally, having declared its enmity towards both the USSR and the US. The friction with the USSR intensified after border clashes on the Ussuri River in March 1969 as Chinese leaders prepared for all-out war. In June 1969, the PLA's enforcement of political discipline and suppression of the factions that had emerged during the Cultural Revolution became intertwined with the central Party's efforts to accelerate Third Front. Those who did not return to work would be viewed as engaging in 'schismatic activity' which risked undermining preparations to defend China from potential invasion.

In October 1969, the Party attempted to focus more on war preparedness and less on suppressing factions. That month, senior leaders were evacuated from Beijing. Amid the tension, Lin issued the "Order Number One", which appeared to be an executive order to prepare for war to the PLA's eleven military regions on October 18 without going through Mao. This drew the ire of the chairman, who saw it as evidence that his declared successor was usurping his authority.

The prospect of war elevated the PLA to greater prominence in domestic politics, increasing Lin's stature at Mao's expense. Some evidence suggests that Mao was pushed to seek closer relations with the US as a means to avoid PLA dominance that would result from a military confrontation with the Soviet Union. During his later meeting with Richard Nixon in 1972, Mao hinted that Lin had opposed better relations with the U.S.

==== Restoration of State Chairman position ====
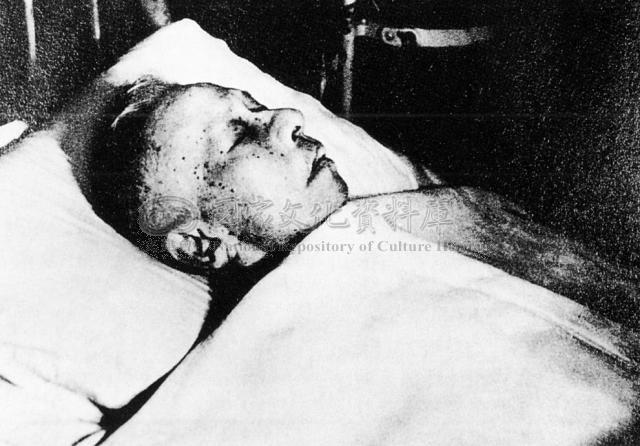
PRC Chairman (President) Liu Shaoqi on his deathbed in 1969

After Lin was confirmed as Mao's successor, his supporters focused on the restoration of the position of State Chairman, (Note: This position, effectively China's de jure state representative, was renamed "President" in 1982.) which had been abolished by Mao after Liu's purge. They hoped that by allowing Lin to ease into a constitutionally sanctioned role, whether Chairman or vice-chairman, Lin's succession would be institutionalized. The consensus within the Politburo was that Mao should assume the office with Lin as vice-chairman; but perhaps wary of Lin's ambitions or for other unknown reasons, Mao voiced his explicit opposition.

Factional rivalries intensified at the Second Plenum of the Ninth Congress in Lushan held in late August 1970. Chen, now aligned with the PLA faction loyal to Lin, galvanized support for the restoration of the office of President of China, despite Mao's wishes. Moreover, Chen launched an assault on Zhang, a staunch Maoist who embodied the chaos of the Cultural Revolution, over the evaluation of Mao's legacy.

The attacks on Zhang found favour with many Plenum attendees and may have been construed by Mao as an indirect attack on the CR. Mao confronted Chen openly, denouncing him as a "false Marxist", and removed him from the Politburo Standing Committee. In addition to the purge of Chen, Mao asked Lin's principal generals to write self-criticisms on their political positions as a warning to Lin. Mao also inducted several of his supporters to the Central Military Commission and placed loyalists in leadership roles of the Beijing Military Region.

=== Project 571 ===
By 1971, the diverging interests of the civilian and military leaders were apparent. Mao was troubled by the PLA's newfound prominence, and the purge of Chen marked the beginning of a gradual scaling-down of the PLA's political involvement. According to official sources, sensing the reduction of Lin's power base and his declining health, Lin's supporters plotted to use the military power still at their disposal to oust Mao in a coup.

Lin's son Lin Liguo, along with other high-ranking military conspirators, formed a coup apparatus in Shanghai and dubbed the plan to oust Mao Outline for Project 571 – in the original Mandarin, the phrase sounds similar to the term for 'military uprising'. It is disputed whether Lin Biao was directly involved in this process. While official sources maintain that Lin did plan and execute the coup attempt, scholars such as Jin Qiu portray Lin as passive, cajoled by elements among his family and supporters. Qiu contests that Lin Biao was ever personally involved in drafting the Outline, with evidence suggesting that Lin Liguo was directly responsible for the draft.

==== Lin's flight and plane crash ====
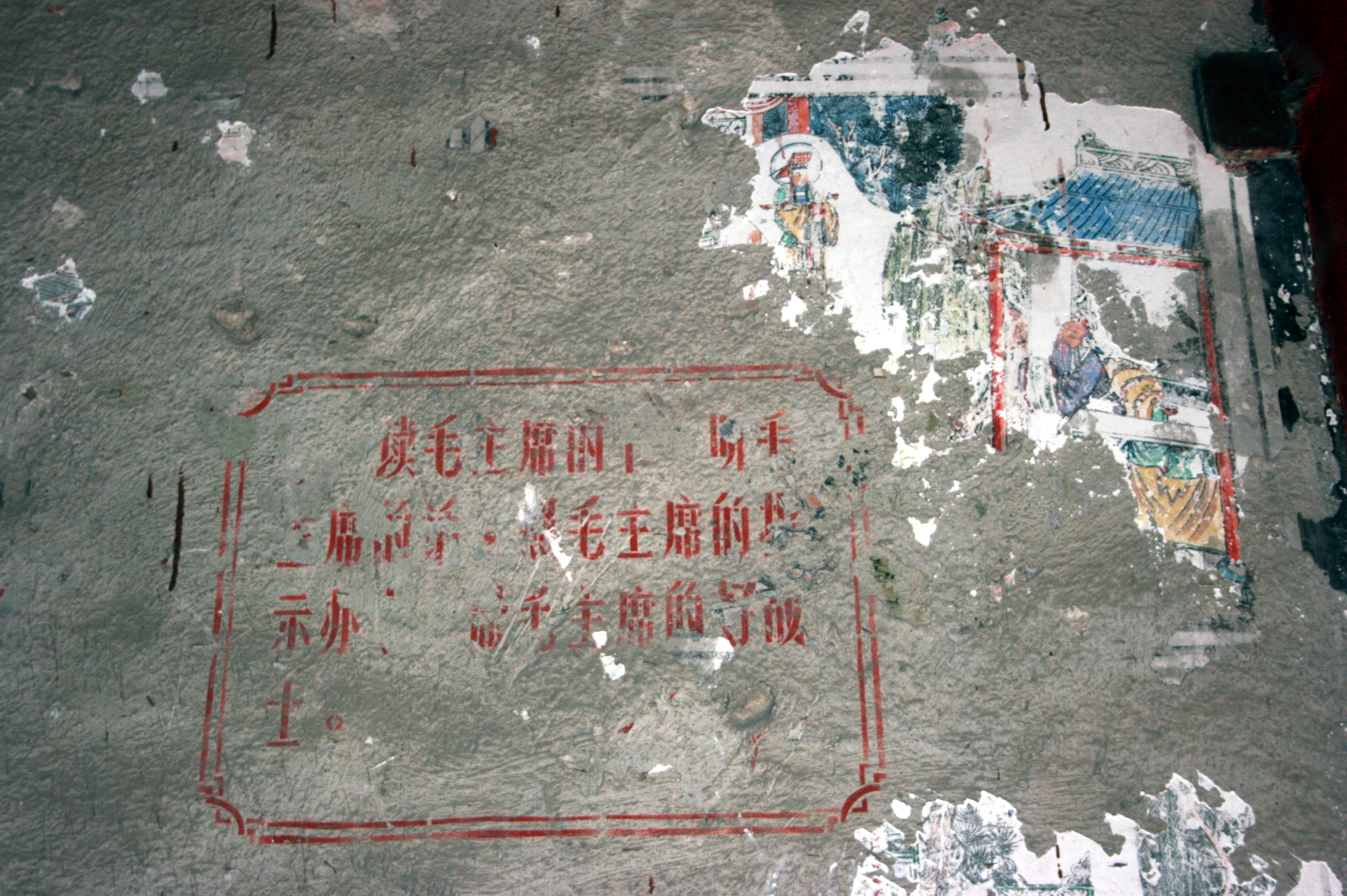
Graffiti of Lin Biao's foreword to the Little Red Book, with his name (lower right) later scratched out

According to the official CCP narrative, on 13 September, Lin Biao, his wife Ye Qun, Lin Liguo, and members of his staff attempted to flee to the USSR ostensibly to seek political asylum. En route, Lin's plane crashed in Mongolia, killing all on board. The plane apparently ran out of fuel. A Soviet investigative team was not able to determine the cause of the crash but hypothesized that the pilot was flying low to evade radar and misjudged the plane's altitude.

The account was questioned by those who raised doubts over Lin's choice of the USSR as a destination, the plane's route, the identity of the passengers, and whether or not a coup was actually taking place.

On 13 September, the Politburo met in an emergency session to discuss Lin. His death was confirmed in Beijing only on 30 September, which led to the cancellation of the National Day celebration events the following day. The Central Committee did not release news of Lin's death to the public until two months later. Many Lin supporters sought refuge in Hong Kong. Those who remained on the mainland were purged.

The event caught the party leadership off guard: the concept that Lin could betray Mao de-legitimized a vast body of Cultural Revolution political rhetoric and by extension, Mao's absolute authority. For several months following the incident, the party information apparatus struggled to find a "correct way" to frame the incident for public consumption, but as the details came to light, the majority of the Chinese public felt disillusioned and realised they had been manipulated for political purposes.

== 1972–1976: The Gang of Four ==
Mao became depressed and reclusive after the Lin incident. Sensing a sudden loss of direction, Mao reached out to old comrades whom he had denounced in the past. Meanwhile, in September 1972, Mao transferred a 38-year-old cadre from Shanghai, Wang Hongwen, to Beijing and made him Party vice-chairman. Wang, a former factory worker from a peasant background, was seemingly getting groomed for succession.

Jiang's position strengthened after Lin's flight. She held tremendous influence with the radical camp. With Mao's health on the decline, Jiang's political ambitions began to emerge. She allied herself with Wang and propaganda specialists Zhang Chunqiao and Yao Wenyuan, forming a political clique later pejoratively dubbed as the Gang of Four.

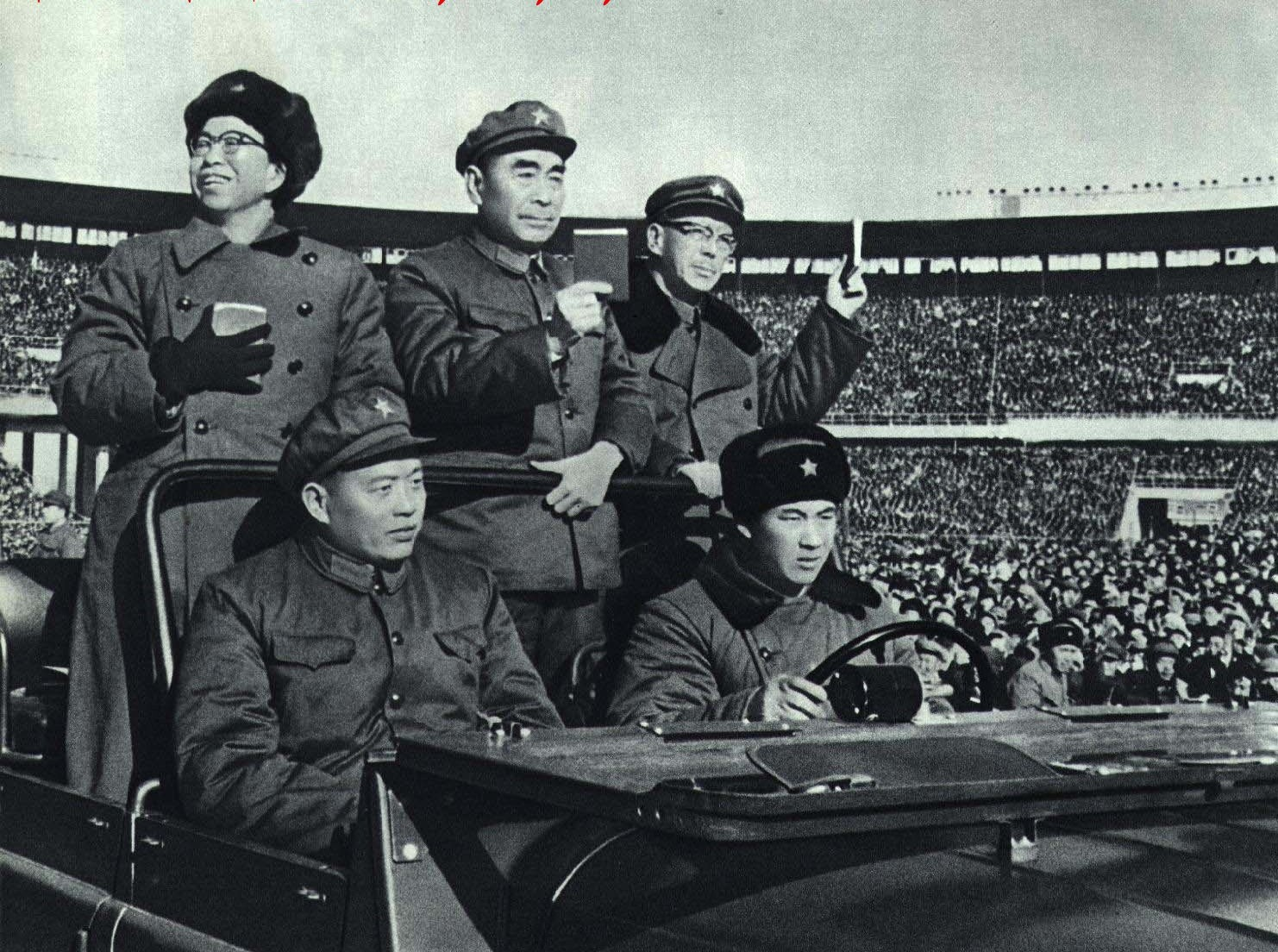
Jiang Qing (left) receiving Red Guards in Beijing with Zhou Enlai (center) and Kang Sheng, with each holding a copy of the Little Red Book

By 1973, round after round of political struggles had left many lower-level institutions, including local government, factories, and railways, short of competent staff to carry out basic functions. China's economy had fallen into disarray, which led to the rehabilitation of purged lower-level officials. The party's core became heavily dominated by Cultural Revolution beneficiaries and radicals, whose focus remained ideological purity over economic productivity. The economy remained mostly Zhou's domain, one of the few remaining moderates. Zhou attempted to restore the economy, but was resented by the Gang of Four, who identified him as their primary political succession threat.

In late 1973, to weaken Zhou's political position and to distance themselves from Lin's apparent betrayal, the Criticize Lin, Criticize Confucius campaign began under Jiang's leadership. Its stated goals were to purge China of New Confucianist thinking and denounce Lin's actions as traitorous and regressive.

=== Deng Xiaoping's rehabilitation (1975) ===
Deng Xiaoping returned to the political scene, assuming the post of Vice-Premier in March 1973, in the first of a series of Mao-approved promotions. After Zhou withdrew from active politics in January 1975, Deng was effectively put in charge of the government, party, and military, then adding the additional titles of PLA General Chief of Staff, Vice Chairman of the Chinese Communist Party, and vice-chairman of the Central Military Commission.

Mao wanted to use Deng as a counterweight to the military faction in government to suppress former Lin loyalists. In addition, Mao had also lost confidence in the Gang of Four and saw Deng as the alternative. Leaving the country in grinding poverty would damage the positive legacy of the CR, which Mao worked hard to protect. Deng's return set the scene for a protracted factional struggle between the radical Gang of Four and moderates led by Zhou and Deng.

At the time, Jiang and associates held effective control of mass media and the party's propaganda network, while Zhou and Deng held control of most government organs. On some decisions, Mao sought to mitigate the Gang's influence, but on others, he acquiesced to their demands. The Gang of Four's political and media control did not prevent Deng from enacting his economic policies. Deng emphatically opposed Party factionalism, and his policies aimed to promote unity to restore economic productivity. Much like the post-Great Leap restructuring led by Liu Shaoqi, Deng streamlined the railway system, steel production, etc. By late 1975, however, Mao saw that Deng's economic restructuring might negate the CR's legacy and launched the Counterattack the Right-Deviationist Reversal-of-Verdicts Trend, a campaign to oppose "rehabilitating the case for the rightists", alluding to Deng as the country's foremost "rightist". Mao directed Deng to write self-criticisms in November 1975, a move lauded by the Gang of Four.

=== Death of Zhou Enlai ===
On 8 January 1976, Zhou Enlai died of bladder cancer. On 15 January, Deng delivered Zhou's eulogy in a funeral attended by all of China's most senior leaders with the notable absence of Mao, who had grown increasingly critical of Zhou. After Zhou's death, Mao selected the relatively unknown Hua Guofeng instead of a member of the Gang of Four or Deng to become Premier.

The Gang of Four grew apprehensive that spontaneous, large-scale popular support for Zhou could turn the political tide against them. They acted through the media to impose restrictions on public displays of mourning for Zhou. Years of resentment over the CR, the public persecution of Deng—seen as Zhou's ally—and the prohibition against public mourning led to a rise in popular discontent against Mao and the Gang of Four. Official attempts to enforce the mourning restrictions included removing public memorials and tearing down posters commemorating Zhou's achievements. On 25 March 1976, Shanghai's Wen Hui Bao published an article calling Zhou "the capitalist roader inside the Party [who] wanted to help the unrepentant capitalist roader [Deng] regain his power." These propaganda efforts at smearing Zhou's image, however, only strengthened public attachment to Zhou's memory.

=== Tiananmen incident ===
On 4 April 1976, on the eve of China's annual Qingming Festival, a traditional day of mourning, thousands of people gathered around the Monument to the People's Heroes in Tiananmen Square to commemorate Zhou. They honored Zhou by laying wreaths, banners, poems, placards, and flowers at the foot of the Monument. The most apparent purpose of this memorial was to eulogize Zhou, but the Gang of Four were also attacked for their actions against the Premier. A small number of slogans left at Tiananmen even attacked Mao and his Cultural Revolution.

Up to two million people may have visited Tiananmen Square on 4 April. All levels of society, from the most impoverished peasants to high-ranking PLA officers and the children of high-ranking cadres, were represented in the activities. Those who participated were motivated by a mixture of anger over Zhou's treatment, revolt against the Cultural Revolution and apprehension for China's future. The event did not appear to have coordinated leadership.

The Central Committee, under the leadership of Jiang Qing, labelled the event 'counter-revolutionary' and cleared the square of memorial items shortly after midnight on April 6. Attempts to suppress the mourners led to a riot. Police cars were set on fire, and a crowd of over 100,000 people forced its way into several government buildings surrounding the square. Many of those arrested were later sentenced to prison. Similar incidents occurred in other major cities. Jiang and her allies attacked Deng as the incident's 'mastermind', and issued reports on official media to that effect. Deng was formally stripped of all positions inside and outside the Party on 7 April. This marked Deng's second purge.

=== Death of Mao Zedong and the Gang of Four's downfall ===
On 9 September 1976, Mao Zedong died. To Mao's supporters, his death symbolized the loss of China's revolutionary foundation. His death was announced on 9 September. The nation descended into grief and mourning, with people weeping in the streets and public institutions closing for over a week. Hua Guofeng chaired the Funeral Committee and delivered the memorial speech.

Shortly before dying, Mao had allegedly written the message "With you in charge, I'm at ease," to Hua. Hua used this message to substantiate his position as successor. Hua had been widely considered to be lacking in political skill and ambitions, and seemingly posed no serious threat to the Gang of Four in the race for succession. However, the Gang's radical ideas also clashed with influential elders and many Party reformers. With army backing and the support of Marshal Ye Jianying, Director of Central Office Wang Dongxing, Vice Premier Li Xiannian and party elder Chen Yun, on 6 October, the Central Security Bureau's Special Unit 8341 had all members of the Gang of Four arrested in a bloodless coup.

After Mao's death, people characterized as 'beating-smashing-looting elements', who were seen as having disturbed the social order during the CR, were purged or punished. "Beating-smashing-looting elements" had typically been aligned with rebel factions.

== Aftermath ==
=== Transitional period ===
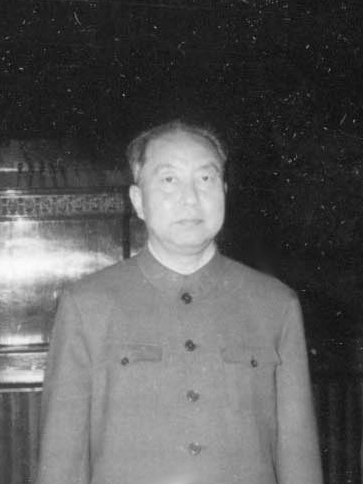
Hua Guofeng succeeded Mao as chairman of the CCP after Mao's death.

Although Hua denounced the Gang of Four in 1976, he continued to invoke Mao's name to justify Mao-era policies. Hua spearheaded what became known as the Two Whatevers. Like Deng, Hua wanted to reverse the CR's damage; but unlike Deng, who wanted new economic models for China, Hua intended to move the Chinese economic and political system towards Soviet-style planning.

On 10 October, Deng wrote a letter to Hua asking to be transferred back to state and party affairs; party elders also called for Deng's return. With increasing pressure from all sides, Premier Hua named Deng Vice-Premier in July 1977, and later promoted him to various other positions, effectively elevating Deng to be China's second-most powerful figure. In August, the 11th National Congress was held in Beijing, officially naming (in ranking order) Hua Guofeng, Ye Jianying, Deng Xiaoping, Li Xiannian and Wang Dongxing as new members of the Politburo Standing Committee.

=== Repudiation and reform under Deng ===
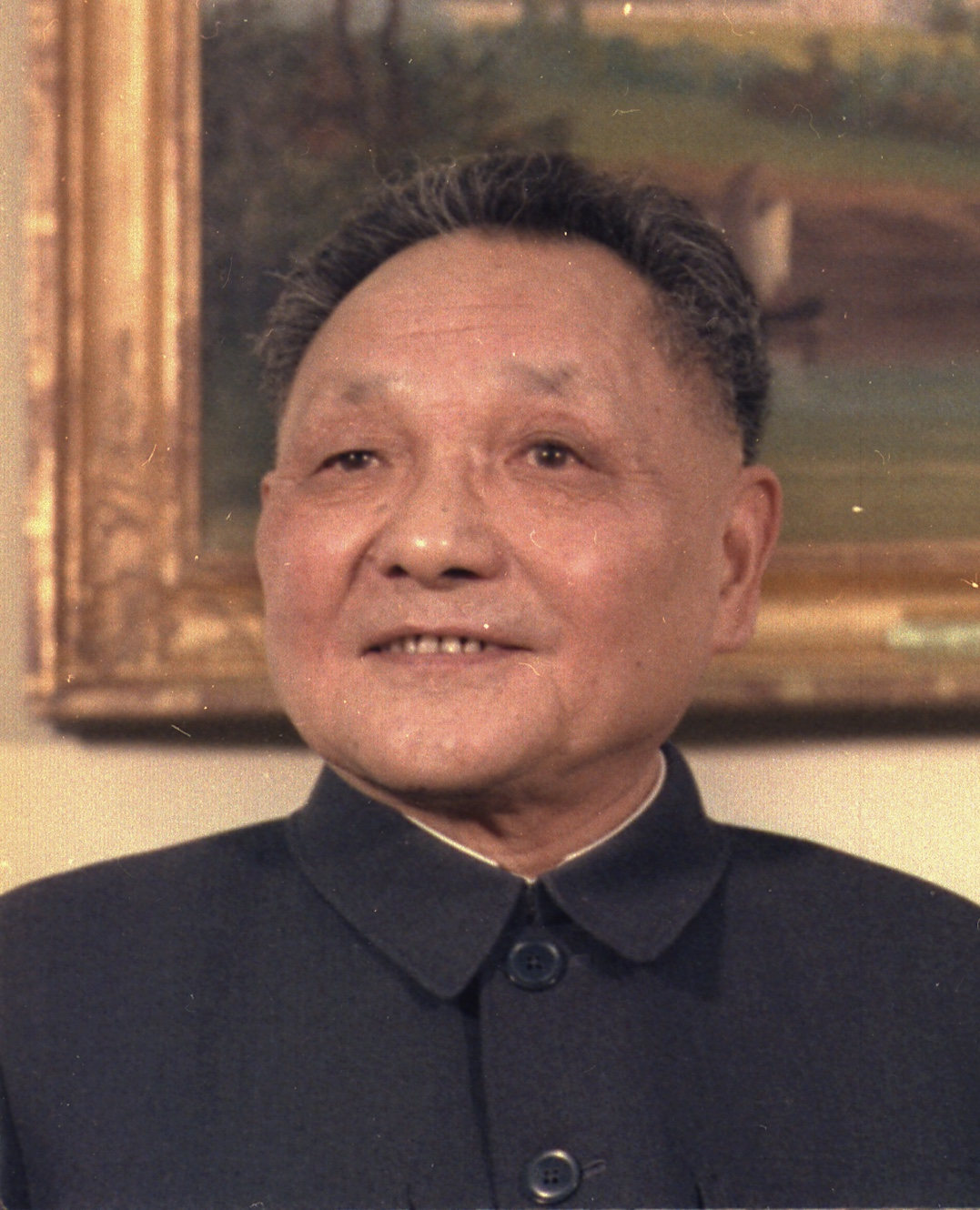
Deng Xiaoping became the paramount leader of China in 1978. He started the process of reform and opening up

Deng Xiaoping first proposed what he called Boluan Fanzheng in September 1977 in order to correct the mistakes of the Cultural Revolution. In May 1978, Deng seized the opportunity to elevate his protégé Hu Yaobang to power. Hu published an article in the Guangming Daily, making clever use of Mao's quotations, while lauding Deng's ideas. Following this article, Hua began to shift his tone in support of Deng. On 1 July, Deng publicized Mao's self-criticism report of 1962 regarding the failure of the Great Leap Forward. As his power base expanded, in September Deng began openly attacking Hua Guofeng's "Two Whatevers". The "1978 Truth Criterion Discussion", launched by Deng and Hu and their allies, also triggered a decade-long New Enlightenment movement in mainland China, promoting democracy, humanism and universal values, while opposing the ideology of Cultural Revolution.

On 18 December 1978, Third Plenum of the 11th Central Committee was held. Deng called for "a liberation of thoughts" and urged the party to "seek truth from facts" and abandon ideological dogma. The Plenum officially marked the beginning of the reform and opening up. Hua Guofeng engaged in self-criticism and called his "Two Whatevers" a mistake. At the Plenum, the Party reversed its verdict on the Tiananmen Incident. Former Chinese president Liu Shaoqi was given a belated state funeral. Peng Dehuai, who was persecuted to death during the Cultural Revolution was rehabilitated in 1978.

At the Fifth Plenum held in 1980, Peng Zhen, He Long and other leaders who had been purged during the Cultural Revolution were rehabilitated. Hu Yaobang became head of the party secretariat as its secretary-general. In September, Hua Guofeng resigned, and Zhao Ziyang, another Deng ally, was named premier. Hua remained on the Central Military Commission, but formal power was transferred to a new generation of pragmatic reformers, who reversed Cultural Revolution policies to a large extent. Within a few years, Deng and Hu helped rehabilitate over 3 million "unjust, false, erroneous" cases. In particular, the trial of the Gang of Four took place in Beijing from 1980 to 1981, and the court stated that 729,511 people had been persecuted by the Gang, of whom 34,800 were said to have died.

In 1981, the Chinese Communist Party passed a resolution and declared that the Cultural Revolution was "responsible for the most severe setback and the heaviest losses suffered by the Party, the country, and the people since the founding of the People's Republic."

== Violence ==
=== Death toll ===
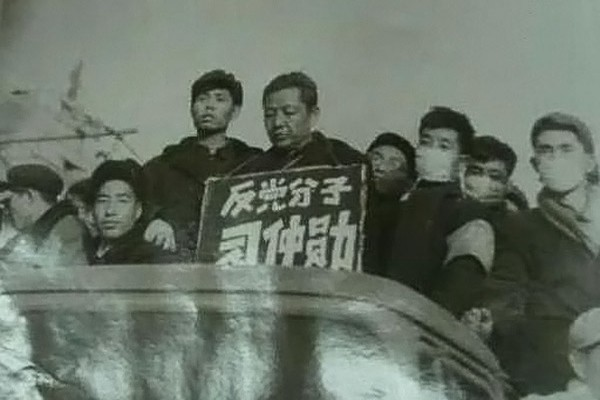
A struggle session in September 1967 targeting Xi Zhongxun, the father of Xi Jinping, who had been labeled an "anti-party element"

Fatality estimates vary across different sources, usually ranging from hundreds of thousands to millions. In addition to various regimes of secrecy and obfuscation concerning the Revolution, both top-down as perpetuated by authorities, as well as laterally among the Chinese public in the decades since, the discrepancies are due in large part to the totalistic nature of the Revolution itself: it is a significant challenge for historians to discern whether and in what ways discrete events that took place during the Cultural Revolution should be ascribed to it.

Most deaths occurred after the mass movements ended, when organized campaigns attempted to consolidate order in workplaces and communities. As Andrew G. Walder summarizes, "The cure for factional warfare was far worse than the disease." Serious man-made disasters such as the 1975 Banqiao Dam failure, also caused many deaths.

Literature reviews of the overall death toll due to the Cultural Revolution usually include the following:

Time	Source	Deaths (in millions)	Remarks
2014	Andrew G. Walder	1.1–1.6	Examines the period between 1966 and 1971. Walder reviewed the reported deaths in 2,213 annals from every county and interpreted the annals' vague language in the most conservative manner. For instance, "some died" and "a couple died" were interpreted as zero death, while "death in the scale of tens/hundreds/thousands" were interpreted as "ten/a hundred/a thousand died". The reported deaths underestimate the actual deaths, especially because some annals actively covered up deaths. Annal editors were supervised by the CCP Propaganda Department. In 2003, Walder and Yang Su coauthored a paper along this approach, but with fewer county annals available at the time.
1999	Ding Shu	2	Ding's figures include 100,000 killed in the Red Terror during 1966, with 200,000 forced to commit suicide, plus 300,000–500,000 killed in violent struggles, 500,000 during Cleansing the Class Ranks, 200,000 during One Strike-Three Anti Campaign and the Anti-May Sixteenth Elements Campaign.
1996	CCP History Research Center	1.728	The 1.728 million were counted as "unnatural deaths", among which 9.4% (162,000) were CCP party members and 252,000 were intellectuals. The figures were extracted from 建国以来历次政治运动事实; 'Facts on the Successive Political Movements since the Founding of the PRC', a book by the party's History Research Center, which states that "according to CCP internal investigations in 1978 and 1984 ... 21.44 million were investigated, 125 million got implicated in these investigations; [...] 4.2 million were detained (by Red Guards and other non-police), 1.3 million were arrested by police, 1.728 million of unnatural deaths; [...] 135,000 were executed for crimes of counter-revolution; [...] during violent struggles 237,000 were killed and 7.03 million became disabled". While these internal investigations were never mentioned or published in any other official documents, the scholarly consensus found these figures very reasonable.
1991	Rudolph J. Rummel	7.731	Rummel included his estimate of Laogai camp deaths in this figure. He estimated that 5% of the 10 million people in the Laogai camps died each year of the 12-year period, and that this amounts to roughly 6 million.
1982	Ye Jianying	3.42–20	Several sources have quoted a statement made by Marshal Ye Jianying, of "683,000 deaths in the cities, 2.5 million deaths in the countryside, plus 123,700 deaths due to violent struggles and 115,500 deaths due to struggle sessions and imprisonment, in addition to 557,000 people missing." In a 2012 interview with Hong Kong's Open Magazine, an unnamed bureaucrat in Beijing claimed that Ye made the statement in a 1982 CCP meeting, while he was the party's Vice Chairman. Several sources have also quoted that Marshal Ye estimated the death toll to be 20 million during a CCP working conference in December 1978. Academic Jie Li writes that scholarship has discredited Ye's 20 million estimate.
1979	Agence France Presse	0.4	This figure was obtained by an AFP correspondent in Beijing, citing an unnamed but "usually reliable" source. In 1986, Maurice Meisner referred to this number as a "widely accepted nationwide figure", but also said "The toll may well have been higher. It is unlikely that it was less." Jonathan Leightner asserted that the number is "perhaps one of the best estimates".

=== Massacres ===
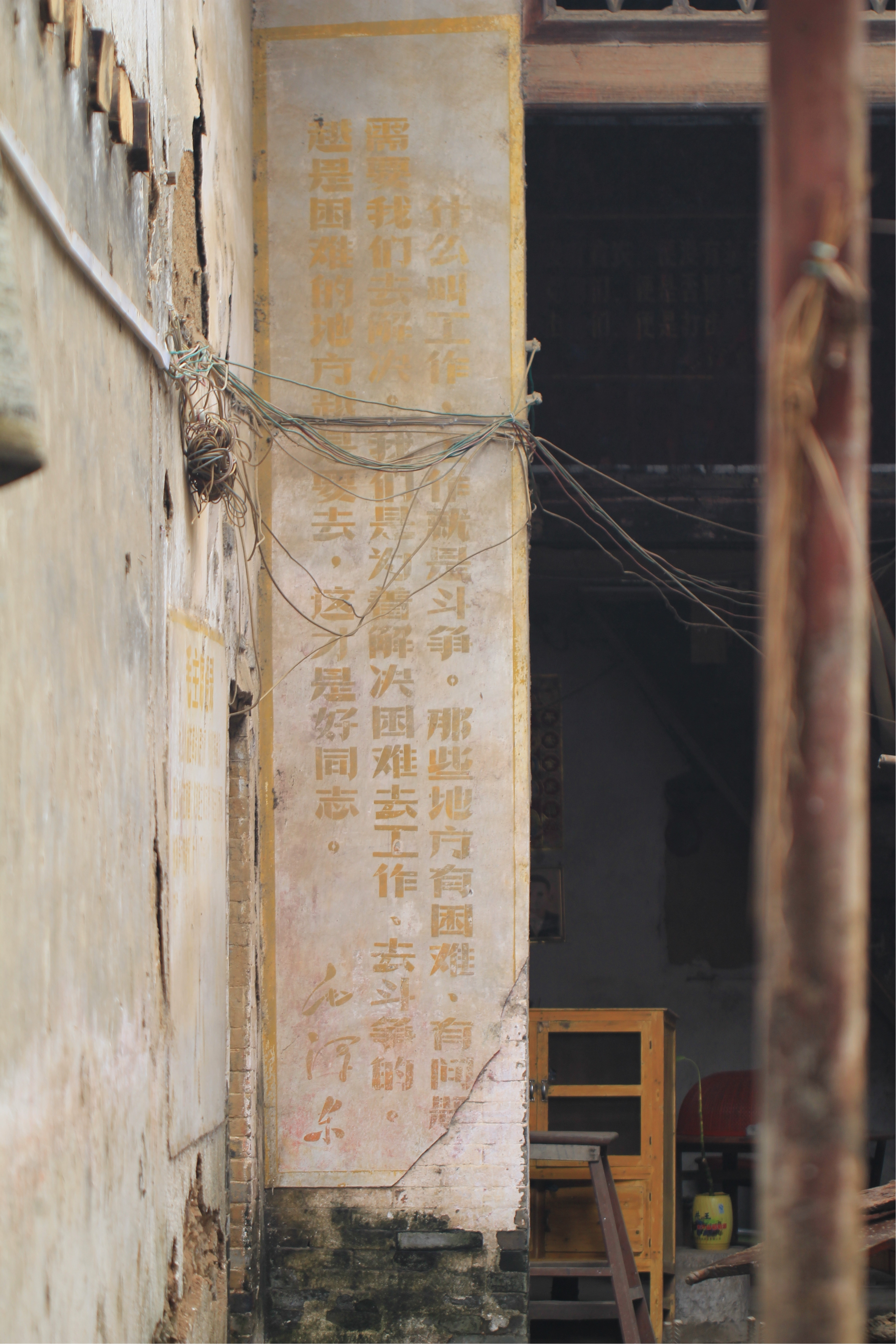
Quotations of Mao Zedong on a street wall of Wuxuan County, one of the centers of the Guangxi Massacre

Massacres took place across China, including in Guangxi, Inner Mongolia, Guangdong, Yunnan, Hunan, Ruijin, and Qinghai, as well as Red August in Beijing.

These massacres were mainly led and organized by local revolutionary committees, Communist Party branches, militia, and the military. Most victims were members of the Five Black Categories as well as their children, or members of "rebel groups". Chinese scholars have estimated that at least 300,000 people died in these massacres. Collective killings in Guangxi and Guangdong were among the most serious. In Guangxi, the official annals of at least 43 counties have records of massacres, with 15 of them reporting a death toll of over 1,000, while in Guangdong at least 28 county annals record massacres, with 6 of them reporting a death toll of over 1,000.

Official sources in 1980 revealed that, during the Red August, at least 1,772 people were killed by Red Guards, including teachers and principals of many schools, meanwhile 33,695 homes were ransacked and 85,196 families were forced to flee. The Daxing Massacre in rural Beijing caused the deaths of 325 people from 27 August to 1 September 1966; those killed ranged from 80 years old to a 38-day old baby, with 22 families being completely wiped out.

In Dao County, Hunan, a total of 7,696 people were killed from 13 August to 17 October 1967, in addition to 1,397 forced to commit suicide, and 2,146 becoming permanently disabled.

In the Guangxi Massacre, the official record shows an estimated death toll from 100,000 to 150,000 as well as cannibalism primarily between 1967 and 1968 in Guangxi, where one of the worst violent struggles of the Revolution took place, before Zhou sent the PLA to intervene.

In 1975, the PLA led a massacre in Yunnan around the town of Shadian, targeting Hui people, resulting in the deaths of more than 1,600 civilians, including 300 children, and the destruction of 4,400 homes.

=== Violent struggles, struggle sessions, and purges ===
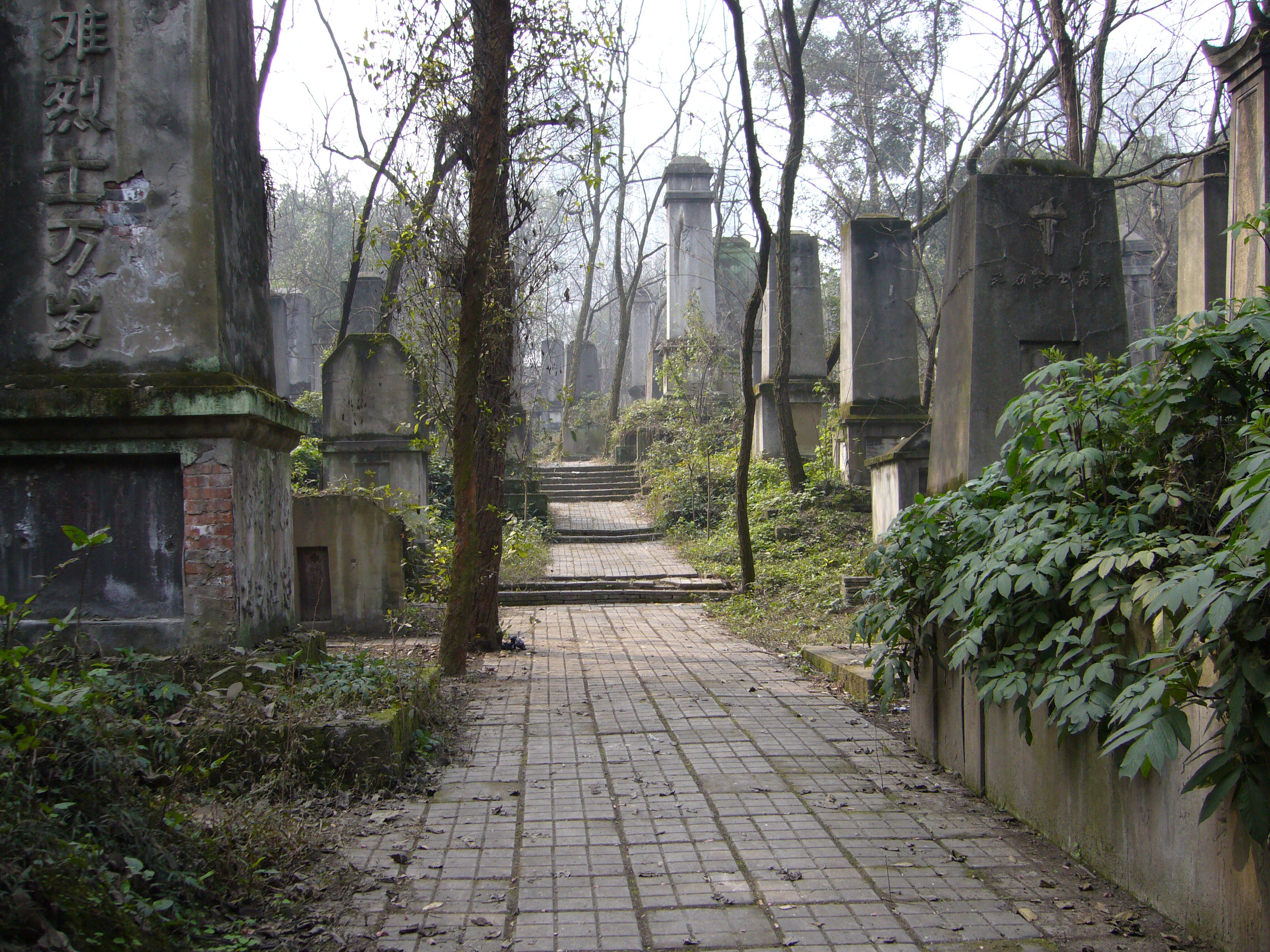
The Cultural Revolution Cemetery in Chongqing, where 400–500 people killed in factional clashes are buried, out of a total of at least 1,700 deaths.

Violent struggles were factional conflicts (mostly among Red Guards and "rebel groups") that began in Shanghai and then spread to other areas in 1967. They brought the country to a state of civil war. Weapons used included some 18.77 million guns (Note: Some claim 1.877 million.), 2.72 million grenades, 14,828 cannons, millions of other ammunition and even armored cars and tanks. Notable violent struggles include the battles in Chongqing, in Sichuan, and in Xuzhou. Researchers claimed that the nationwide death toll in violent struggles ranged from 300,000 to 500,000.

The recorded rate of violence rose in 1967, reaching a peak that summer before dropping suddenly. During 1967, casualties were relatively low as the weapons used were primarily clubs, spears, and rocks until late July. Although firearms and heavier weapons began to spread during summer, most were neither trained nor committed fighters and therefore casualties remained relatively low. The peak of collective violence in summer 1967 dropped sharply after August, when Mao became concerned about rebel attacks on local army units and thereafter made clear that his prior calls to "drag out" army commanders was a mistake and he would instead support besieged army commands.

The greatest number of casualties occurred during the process of restoring order in 1968, although the overall number of violent conflicts was lower. Walder stated that while "rising casualties from a smaller number of insurgent conflicts surely reflected the increasing scale and organizational coherence of rebel factions, and their growing access to military weaponry[,]" another important factor was that "[t]he longer that local factional warfare continued without the prospect of an equitable political settlement, the greater the stakes for the participants and the more intense the collective violence as factions fought to avoid the consequence of losing."

In addition to violent struggles, millions of Chinese were violently persecuted, especially via struggle sessions. Those identified as spies, "running dogs", "revisionists", or coming from a suspect class (including those related to former landlords or rich peasants) were subject to beating, imprisonment, rape, torture, sustained and systematic harassment and abuse, seizure of property, denial of medical attention, and erasure of social identity. Some people were not able to stand the torture and committed suicide. Researchers claimed that at least 100,000 to 200,000 people committed suicide during the early CR.

At the same time, many "unjust, false, and mistaken" cases appeared due to political purges. In addition to those who died in massacres, a large number of people died or became permanently disabled due to lynching or other forms of persecution. From 1968 to 1969, the Cleansing the Class Ranks purge caused the deaths of at least 500,000 people. Purges of similar nature such as the One Strike-Three Anti Campaign and the campaign towards the May Sixteenth elements were launched in the 1970s. For example, a political purge in Yunnan province, the Zhao Jianmin spy case, resulted in 17,000 deaths and wrongfully persecuted a total of 1.38 million people.

While official state media required photographers to capture revolutionary fervor, some photojournalists secretly documented the movement's 'dark side' at great personal risk. Li Zhensheng, a photographer for the Heilongjiang Daily, amassed nearly 100,000 negatives—including images of struggle sessions and executions—which he hid under the parquet floorboards of his home in Harbin for decades. These images, many of which were not developed until years later, now serve as a rare visual testament to the daily realities of the era outside of Beijing.

=== Repression of ethnic minorities ===
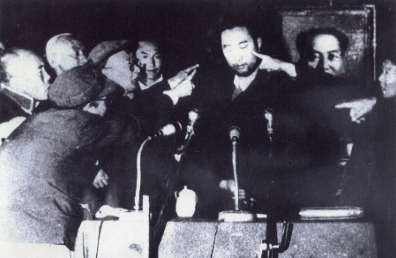
The Panchen Lama during a struggle session

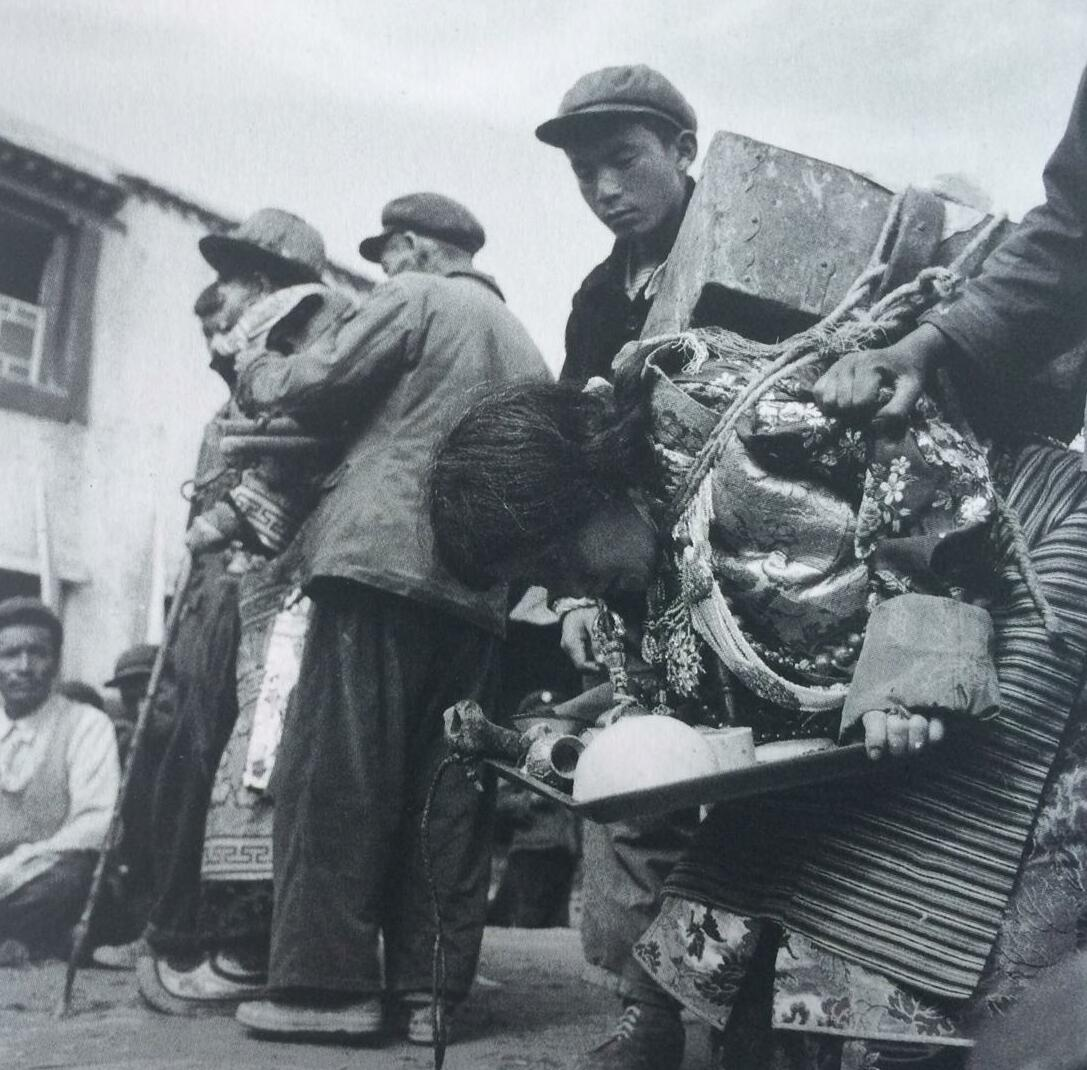
Struggle session of Sampho Tsewang Rigzin and his wife

The Cultural Revolution wrought havoc on minority cultures and ethnicities. Languages and customs of ethnic minorities in China were labeled as part of the Four Olds, texts in ethnic languages were burned, and bilingual education was suppressed. In Inner Mongolia, some 790,000 people were persecuted during the Inner Mongolia incident. Of these, 22,900 were beaten to death, and 120,000 were maimed, during a witch hunt to find members of the alleged separatist New Inner Mongolian People's Revolutionary Party. In Xinjiang, copies of the Qur'an and other books of the Uyghur people were apparently burned. Muslim imams reportedly were paraded around with paint splashed on their bodies.

In Yunnan Province, the palace of the Dai people's king was torched, and a massacre of Muslim Hui people at the hands of the PLA in Yunnan, known as the Shadian incident, reportedly claimed over 1,600 lives in 1975. After the Cultural Revolution, the government gave reparations for the Shadian Incident, including the erection of a Martyr's Memorial in Shadian.

In the ethnic Korean areas of northeast China, clashes took place. In Yanbian Korean Autonomous Prefecture, where freight trains trundled from China into North Korea, corpses of Koreans killed in the pitched battles of the Cultural Revolution were draped with revolutionary graffiti. The Governor, Zhu Dehai, an ethnic Korean, was branded as a traitor and a North Korean spy and was later purged.

Concessions to minorities were abolished during the Cultural Revolution as part of the Red Guards' attack on the "Four Olds". People's communes, previously only established in parts of Tibet, were established throughout Tibet Autonomous Region in 1966, removing Tibet's exemption from China's land reform, and reimposed in other minority areas. The effect on Tibet was particularly severe as it came following the repression after the 1959 Tibetan uprising. The destruction of nearly all of its over 6,000 monasteries, which began before the Cultural Revolution, were often conducted with the complicity of local ethnic Tibetan Red Guards. Only eight were intact by the end of the 1970s.

Many monks and nuns were killed, and the general population was subjected to physical and psychological torture. An estimated 600,000 monks and nuns lived in Tibet in 1950, but by 1979, most were dead, imprisoned or had disappeared. The Tibetan government in exile claimed that many Tibetans died from famines in 1961–1964 and 1968–1973 as a result of forced collectivization, however, the number of Tibetan deaths or whether famines, in fact, took place in these periods is disputed. Despite persecution, some local leaders and minority ethnic practices survived in remote regions.

It was felt that pushing minority groups too hard would compromise China's border defenses. This was especially important as minorities make up a large percentage of the population that live in border regions. In the late 1960s, China experienced a period of strained relations with some of its neighbors, notably with the Soviet Union and India.

=== Rape and sexual abuse ===
Pan Suiming, Emily Honig, and others documented that rape and sexual abuse of sent-down women were common during the Cultural Revolution's height. Tania Branigan documented that women raped tended to be from educated urban backgrounds while their rapists were poor peasants or local officials.

== Cultural impact and influence ==
=== Red Guards riot ===
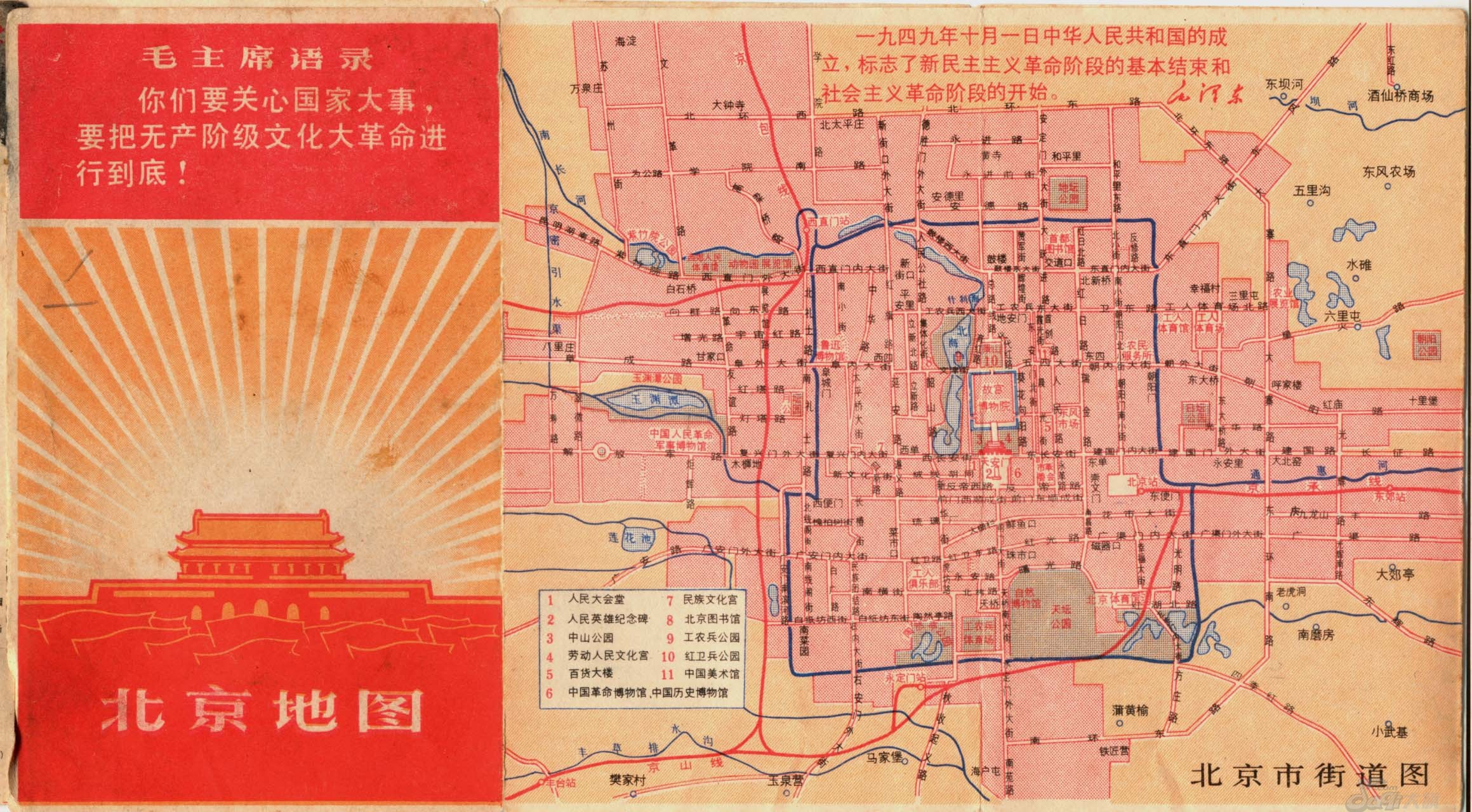
A 1968 map of Beijing showing streets and landmarks renamed during the Cultural Revolution. Andingmen Inner Street became "Great Leap Forward Road", Taijichang Street became the "Road for Eternal Revolution", Dongjiaominxiang was renamed "Anti-Imperialist Road", Beihai Park was renamed "Worker-Peasant-Soldier Park" and Jingshan Park became "Red Guard Park". Most of the Cultural Revolution-era name changes were later reversed.

The revolution aimed to destroy the Four Olds and establish the corresponding "Four News," which ranged from changing of names and cutting of hair to ransacking homes, vandalizing cultural treasures, and desecrating temples.

The revolution aimed to eliminate "cow demons and snake spirits," a term denoting class enemies who promoted bourgeois ideas, as well as those from an exploitative family background or who belonged to one of the Five Black Categories. Large numbers of people perceived to be "monsters and demons" regardless of guilt or innocence were publicly denounced, humiliated, and beaten. In their revolutionary fervor, students, especially the Red Guards, denounced their teachers, and children denounced their parents. Many died from ill-treatment or committed suicide. In 1968, youths were mobilized to go to the countryside in the Down to the Countryside Movement so they may learn from the peasantry, and the departure of millions from the cities helped end the most violent phase of the Cultural Revolution.

=== Academics and intellectuals ===
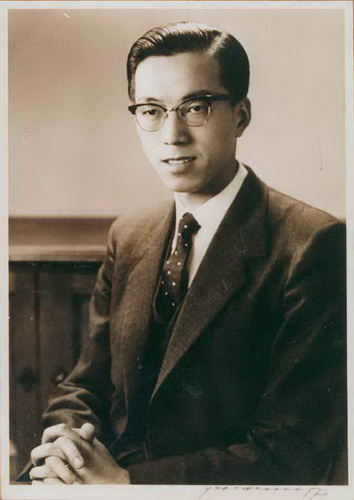
Yao Tongbin, one of China's foremost missile scientists, was beaten to death by a mob in Beijing during the Cultural Revolution (1968). This caused Zhou Enlai to order special protection for key technical experts.

Academics and intellectuals were regarded as the "Stinking Old Ninth" and were widely persecuted. Many were sent to rural labor camps such as the May Seventh Cadre School. The prosecution of the Gang of Four revealed that 142,000 cadres and teachers in the education circles were persecuted. Academics, scientists, and educators who died included Xiong Qinglai, Jian Bozan, Wu Han, Rao Yutai, Wu Dingliang, Yao Tongbin and Zhao Jiuzhang. As of 1968, among the 171 senior members who worked at the headquarters of Chinese Academy of Sciences in Beijing, 131 were persecuted. Among the members of the academy, 229 died. As of September 1971, more than 4,000 staff members of China's nuclear center in Qinghai had been persecuted, while more than 310 were disabled, over 40 committed suicide, and 5 were executed.

Despite the hardships, some significant achievements came in science and technology: scientists tested the first missile, created China's first hydrogen bomb and launched China's first satellite in the "Two Bombs, One Satellite" program.

Many health personnel were deployed to the countryside as barefoot doctors. Some farmers were given informal medical training, and health-care centers were established in rural communities. This process led to a marked improvement in health and life expectancy.

=== Education system ===
Schools and universities were closed at the beginning of the Cultural Revolution. During this time university, senior middle, and junior middle school students took part in Red Guard activities from 1966–1968. Elementary and middle schools gradually reopened after 1968. Universities were closed until 1970, and most remained closed until 1972. Post-secondary education was disrupted the most and suffered the greatest losses in quantity, changes in quality, and time passed before institutions reopened. Elementary schools were the least impacted; a small number of schools continued to hold classes without serious interruption, while some others only lost a semester. Most middle schools only resumed classes after the end of the Red Guard movement in 1968. Secondary school classes of 1966, 1967, and 1968 were unable to graduate on time later and became known as the "Old Three Cohort (老三届)".

Middle schools faced logistical problems after being reopened in 1968. Schools now had two extra cohorts of students to manage; those whose education was disrupted or delayed from 1966-1968, as well as a shortage of teachers since many had been purged. During this time, older cohorts were required to take part in the previously optional Down to the Countryside Movement.These sent-down youth would refer to themselves as the "lost generation" as a result of being deprived of higher education and urban employment opportunities. The official ideological motivation behind the program was to allow youth to experience the revolutionary origins of the party, and to contribute to China's rural development. However, the program has also been perceived as a practical response to the civil unrest in urban centers generated by the youth in the Red Guard movement who were neither employed nor in school. In the post-Mao period, many of those forcibly moved attacked the policy as a violation of their human rights.

==== Education system reform ====
The education system was to be thoroughly transformed as introduced in CCP's "16-Point Decision" on 9 August 1966. Article 10 described how "an important task of cultural revolution was to transform the education system and the older ways of teaching" and that "bourgeois intellectuals must no longer dominate" the education system. University and senior middle school examination methods would be reworked so they no longer resembled the bourgeois format. The new method of selection would be based on work unit recommendations and political backgrounds. Additionally, all formats for schooling, testing, and promotion would be revised along with the content of education. The national unified curriculum was abolished which left each institution to rebuild its own curriculum based on the radical principles of shorter classes, less classroom learning, more practice plus labor and politics education.

Authorities applied experiments in education reform to rural schools first, and to urban schools second. However, formulas designed for the countryside faced problems when applied in cities, such as the introduction of peasant managed schools. The equivalent in the urban context could only be schools run by factories and street organizations which had no potential for universal urban development. As a result of the difference between urban and rural communities, urban schools had to adapt more specifically to the different conditions of city life.

==== Rural education ====
The education reform mandated that village-level production brigades administered elementary schools, and communes administered middle schools. Additionally, authorities instructed schools to be run as close to students' homes as possible. Along with administering elementary schools, the reform made production brigades run their own complete elementary schools as well. Furthermore, it ordered each commune to have its own middle school with enrollment based on recommendation and ability, with priority given to worker-peasant youth. Strategies for raising pass rates by holding back and failing low-scoring students was forbidden. The reform also abolished school related fees. If family obligations interfered with a student's attendance, the policy now permitted bringing younger siblings to class and leaving animals to graze at the school gate. Since rural students regularly labored with their parents, the labor part of the curriculum was not required and resulted in agricultural middle schools disappearing as a separate work-study alternative.

==== Urban education ====
The education reform abolished special schools, including those for cadres' children, army children, and those attached to universities where intellectuals' children were prioritized Instead, all became ordinary state-run schools. The reform expected students to attend their nearest neighborhood schools. All urban schools followed a shortened curriculum combining similar proportions of labor, practice, and classroom learning for all students regardless of social or academic standings

==== University education ====
The education reform abolished unified national university entrance exams, and one or two years of work replaced graduation from senior middle school as a new prerequisite for university. Instead, students were selected from groups of candidates recommended by their work units. In October 1970, student recruitment resumed in a few select universities To be accepted, a candidate only needed recommendations from "the people," leadership approval from their production or work units, and approval of the college admissions office. The criteria were largely founded on reliability and personal connections. Later, these new university students were regarded as the worker-soldier-peasant students.

When most universities reopened in 1972, recruitment examinations had been abolished. New major criteria for university admission became class background and party loyalty instead of academic achievements. The only eligible applicants included workers, peasants, and soldiers with two or more years of working experience who had knowledge equivalent to junior middle school graduates or higher. The experience of university education changed as result of the lowered average preparation of enrolled students and the lack of qualified lectures and instructors, many of whom had been sent to the countryside for reeducation.

Industrial universities were established in factories to supply technical and engineering programs for industrial workers, inspired by Mao's July 1968 remarks advocating vocational education. Factories around the country therefore established their own educational programs for technicians and engineers, and by 1976, there were 15,000 such 21 July Universities. Gao Mobo observes that in many underprivileged areas, political campaigns brought improvements in education and public health.

==== School experiences ====
Students from capitalist households often received poor treatment from peers and instructors in schools during the Cultural Revolution. Writing about her experiences as a student from such a household, Xinran discussed how instructors forbade her from taking part in song or dance activities with other girls in her class because of her family's status. Additionally, Xinran was not allowed to sit or stand in the front row during lessons despite her poor eyesight and short height; schools preserved the front rows for the children of peasants, workers, and soldiers as they were the "next generation of the revolution." After-school, teachers made "polluted" children attend political study classes and forbade them from participating in activities with other children their age.

In the initial stage of the Down to the Countryside Movement, most of the youth who took part volunteered. Later on, the government forced them to move. Between 1968 and 1979, 17 million urban youth left for the countryside. Living in the rural areas deprived them of higher education. This generation is sometimes referred to as the "lost generation". Formal literacy measurements did not resume until the 1980s. Some counties in Zhanjiang had literacy rates as low as 59% 20 years after the revolution. This was amplified by the elimination of qualified teachers—many districts were forced to rely on students to teach.

Primary and middle schools gradually reopened during the Cultural Revolution. Schooling years were reduced and education standards fell, but the proportion of Chinese children who completed primary education increased from less than half to almost all, and the fraction who completed junior middle school rose from 15% to over two-thirds. Educational opportunities for rural children expanded, while education of the urban elite were restricted by anti-elitist policies. Radical policies provided many in rural communities with middle school education for the first time. Rural infrastructure developed during this period, facilitated by the political changes that empowered ordinary rural people.

=== Slogans and rhetoric ===
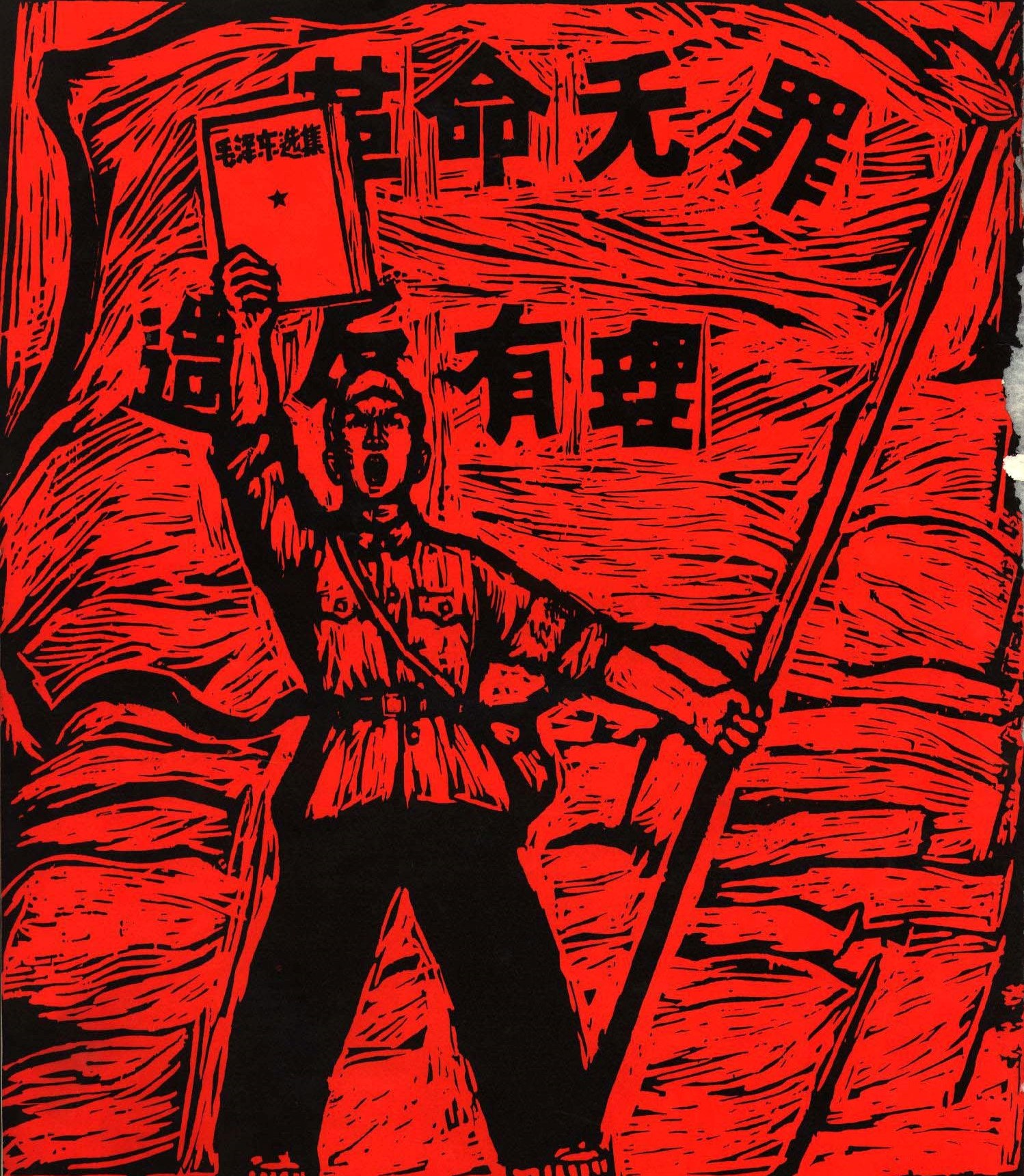
A depiction of a Red Guard holding up the Selected Works of Mao Zedong, with "revolution is no crime, to rebel is justified" written on a flag next to him, 1967

Huang claimed that the Cultural Revolution had massive effects on Chinese society because of the extensive use of political slogans. He claimed that slogans played a central role in rallying Party leadership and citizens. For example, the slogan "to rebel is justified" (造反有理; zàofǎn yǒulǐ) affected many views.

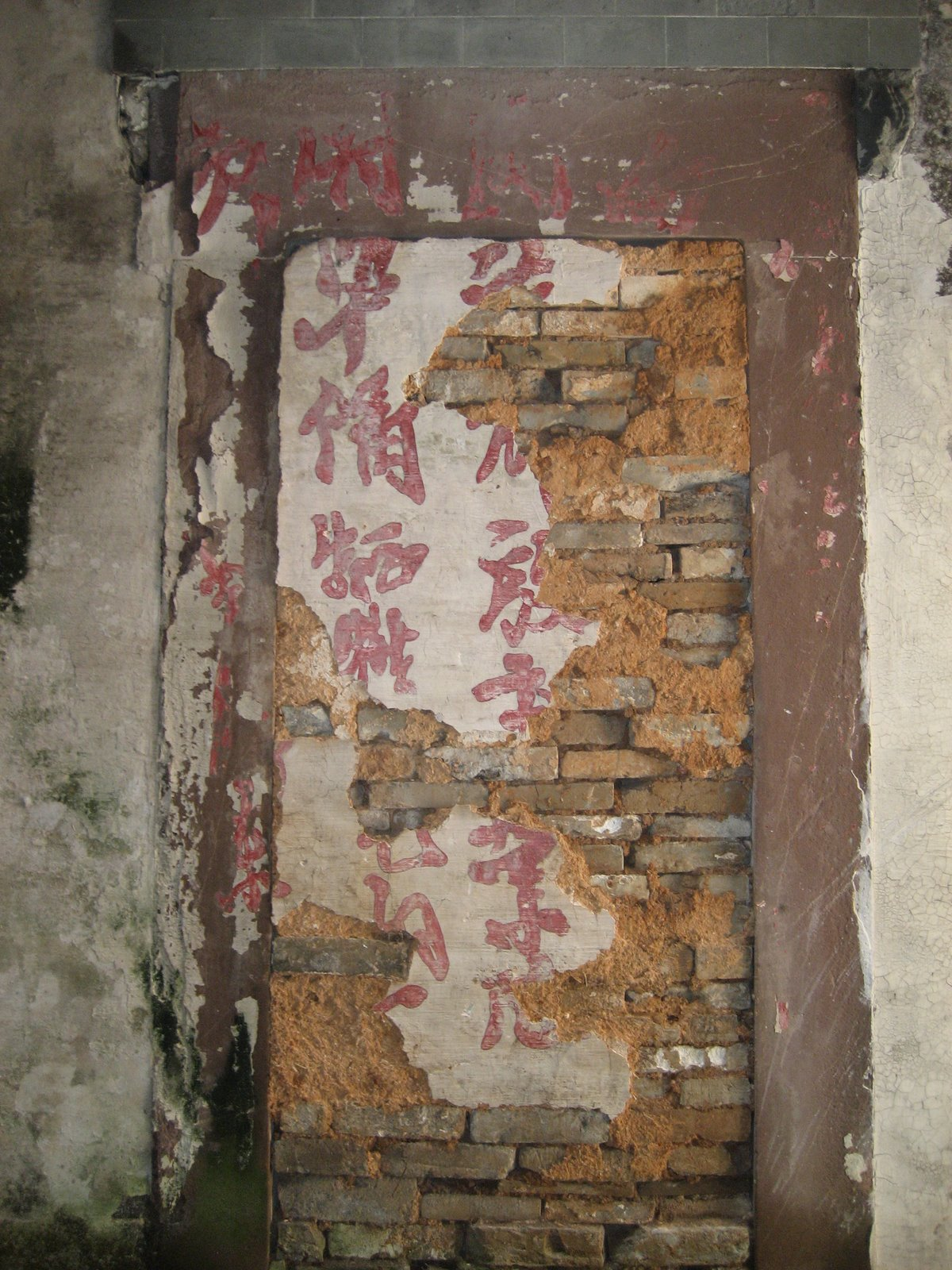
The remnants of a banner containing slogans from the Cultural Revolution in Anhui, 2006

Huang asserted that slogans were ubiquitous in people's lives, printed onto everyday items such as bus tickets, cigarette packets, and mirror tables. Workers were supposed to "grasp revolution and promote production".

Political slogans had three sources: Mao, Party media such as People's Daily, and the Red Guards. Mao often offered vague, yet powerful directives that divided the Red Guards. These directives could be interpreted to suit personal interests, in turn aiding factions' goals in claiming loyalty to Mao.

Dittmer and Chen claim that the Chinese language had historically been defined by subtlety, delicacy, moderation, and honesty, as well as the cultivation of a "refined and elegant literary style". This changed during the CR. These slogans were an effective method of "thought reform", mobilizing millions in a concerted attack upon the subjective world, "while at the same time reforming their objective world."

Dittmer and Chen argued that the emphasis on politics made language into effective propaganda, but "also transformed it into a jargon of stereotypes—pompous, repetitive, and boring". To distance itself from the era, Deng's government cut back on political slogans. During a eulogy for Deng's death, CCP general secretary Jiang Zemin called the Cultural Revolution a "grave mistake".

=== Arts and literature ===
In 1966, Jiang Qing advanced the Theory of the Dictatorship of the Black Line. Those perceived to be bourgeois, anti-socialist or anti-Mao (black line) should be cast aside, and called for the creation of new literature and arts. Disseminators of the "old culture" would be eradicated. The majority of writers and artists were seen as "black line figures" and "reactionary literati", and were persecuted, and subjected to "criticism and denunciation" where they could be humiliated and ravaged, and be imprisoned or sent to hard labour. For instance, Mei Zhi and her husband were sent to a tea farm in Lushan County, Sichuan. She did not resume writing until the 1980s.

In 1970, the CCP came to view the Ministry of Culture as so disruptive that it decided to dissolve the Ministry and establish a Culture Group within the State Council in an effort to rein in cultural politics. No congresses of the China Federation of Literary and Art Circles were held during the Cultural Revolution.

The principles for cultural production laid out by Mao in the 1942 Talks at the Yan'an Forum on Art and Literature became dogmatized. The literary situation eased after 1972, as more were allowed to write, and many provincial literary periodicals resumed publication, but the majority of writers still could not work. Documents released in 1980 regarding the prosecution of the Gang of Four show that more than 2,600 people in the field of arts and literature were persecuted by the Ministry of Culture. Many died: the names of 200 writers and artists who were persecuted to death were commemorated in 1979. These include writers such as Lao She, Fu Lei, Deng Tuo, Baren, Li Guangtian, Yang Shuo and Zhao Shuli.

Depictions of iron girls became a frequent subject of art during the Cultural Revolution, often shown in spaces and activities traditionally associated with male authority as part of an effort to develop the new socialist woman.

==== Opera and music ====
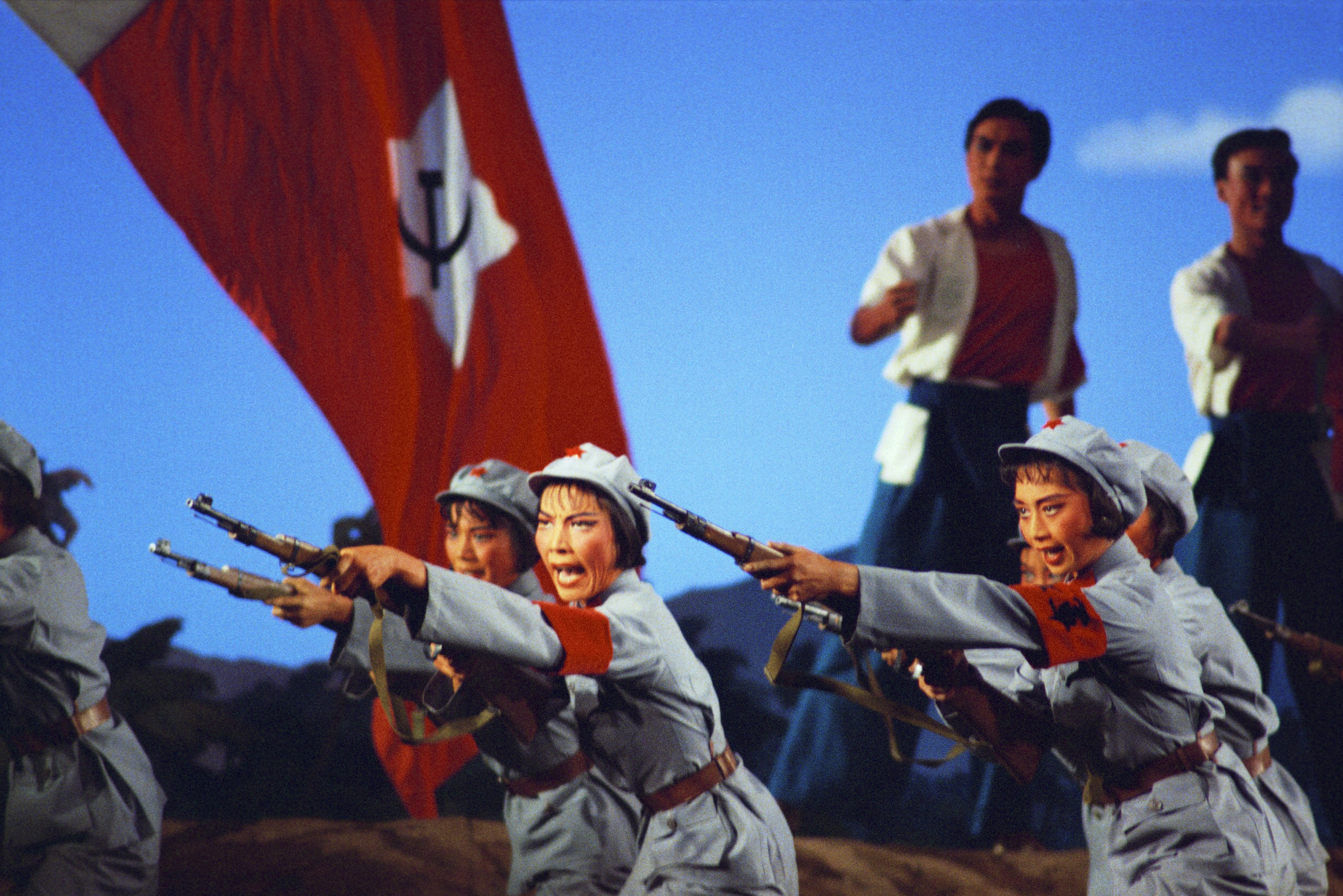
The ballet The Red Detachment of Women, one of the Model Dramas promoted during the Cultural Revolution

Jiang took control of the stage and introduced revolutionary operas under her direct supervision. Traditional operas were banned as they were considered feudalistic and bourgeois, but revolutionary opera, which modified Peking opera in both content and form, was promoted. Six operas and two ballets were produced in the first three years, most notably the opera The Legend of the Red Lantern. These operas were the only approved opera form. Other opera troupes were required to adopt or change their repertoire. Loyalty dances became common and were performed throughout the country by both professional cultural workers and ordinary people. The model operas were broadcast on the radio, made into films, blared from public loudspeakers, taught to students in schools and workers in factories, and became ubiquitous as a form of popular entertainment and were the only theatrical entertainment for millions. Most model dramas featured women as their leads and promoted Chinese state feminism. Their narratives begin with them oppressed by misogyny, class position, and imperialism before liberating themselves through the discovery of internal strength and the CCP.

During the Cultural Revolution, composers of Yellow Music, which had already been banned following the communist revolution, were persecuted, including Li Jinhui who was killed in 1967. Revolution-themed songs instead were promoted, and songs such as "Ode to the Motherland", "Sailing the Seas Depends on the Helmsman", "The East Is Red" and "Without the Communist Party, There Would Be No New China" were either written or became popular during this period. "The East Is Red", especially, became popular; it de facto supplanted "March of the Volunteers" (lyrics author Tian Han persecuted to death) as the national anthem of China, though the latter was later restored to its previous place.

"Quotation songs", in which Mao's quotations were set to music, were particularly popular during the early years of the Cultural Revolution. Composer Li Jiefu first published quotation songs in People's Daily in September 1966 and they were promoted thereafter as a means for studying Quotations from Chairman Mao Zedong. Records of quotation songs were played over loudspeakers, their primary means of distribution, as the use of transistor radios lagged until 1976. Rusticated youths with an interest in broadcast technology frequently operated rural radio stations after 1968. At the 9th National Congress of the Communist Party, Jiang Qing condemned quotation songs, which she had come to view as comparable to yellow music.

==== Visual arts ====
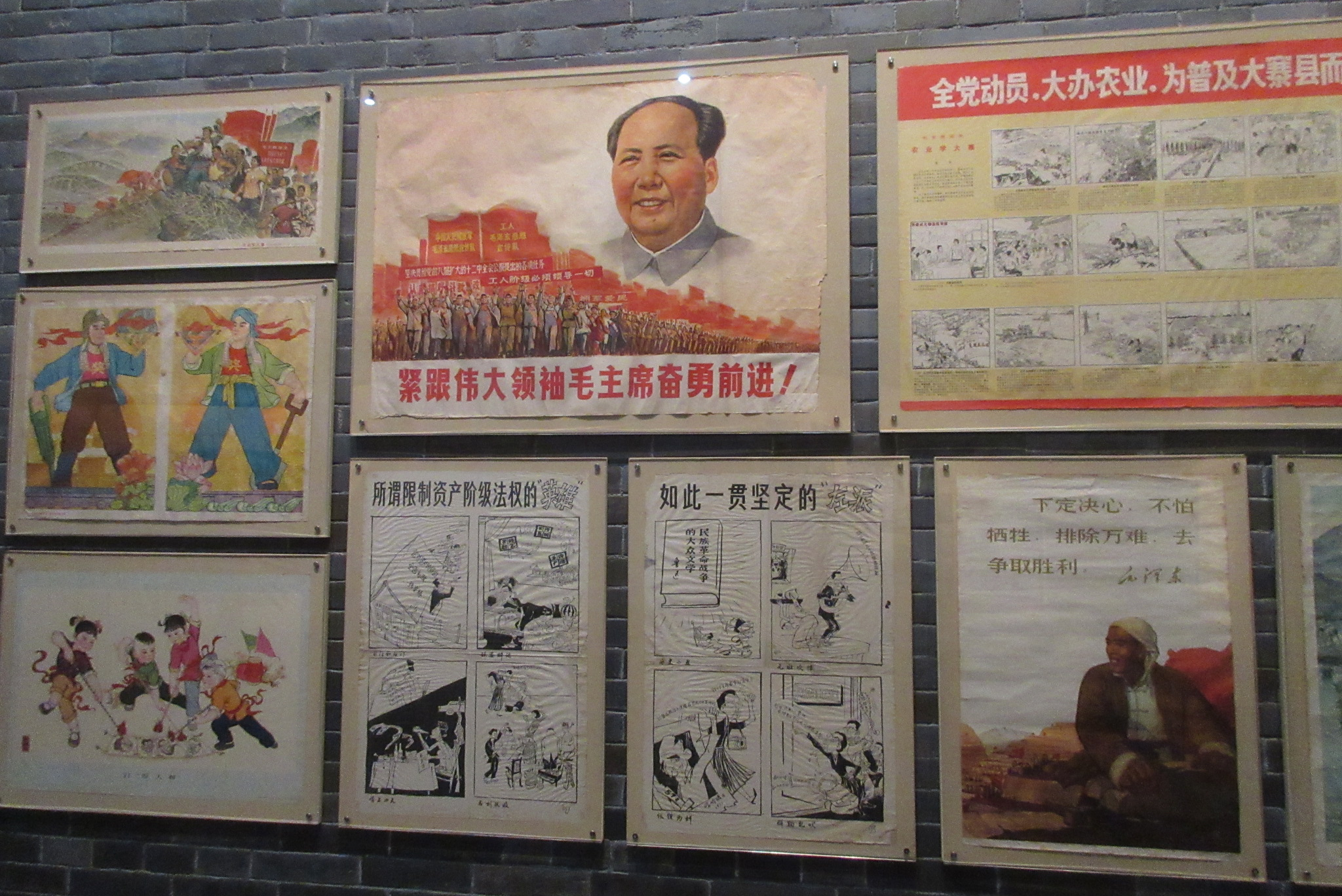
Posters from the Cultural Revolution period

Aesthetic principles emphasized during the Cultural Revolution included the "tall, big, complete," "red, bright, shining," and "the three prominences". According to the principle of the "three prominences," the good are more prominent than the bad, the very good are more prominent than the good, and the one outstanding figure is more prominent than the very good. Other stylistic principles of the Cultural Revolution included "tall, large, and full".

Among the most significant visual works of the Cultural Revolution was Liu Chunhua's 1967 oil painting, Chairman Mao Goes to Anyuan. Another influential painting was Pan Jiajun's 1972 I Am a Petrel, which depicts a young woman soldier repairing a telegraph cables during a storm. Praised as a new classic of depicting a revolutionary heroine, it inspired the creation of similar works and was itself widely distributed as a poster.

Qingtian stone carving, Spring is Everywhere in China, 1972

A Red Guard art movement developed, reaching its peak in 1967. Red Guards from fine arts academies organized large art exhibitions, often in cooperation with rebel groups in work units or the army, which included many amateur art works. The most significant Red Guard art exhibition was Long Live the Triumph of Chairman Mao's Revolutionary Line which opened 1 October 1967 in Beijing and featured more than 1,600 art works in a variety of media produced by artists and amateurs from around the country. Following the exhibition, traveling teams toured art works from the exhibition through rural China and into remote areas. The Red Guard art movement favored forms of art deemed public or anti-elitist, such as black and white woodcuts (or brush and marker illustrations in the style of a woodcut), satirical cartoons, paper cut outs, and forms of folk art. Among the most popular motifs in Red Guard art was the image of a worker, peasant, and soldier conducting criticism or Red Guards doing so. Red Guard groups in fine arts academies also published journals, pamphlets, and manifestos through which they criticized the old art institutions.

Traditional themes were sidelined and artists such as Feng Zikai, Shi Lu, and Pan Tianshou were persecuted. Many of the artists were assigned to manual labour, and artists were expected to depict subjects that glorified the Cultural Revolution related to their labour. In 1971, in part to alleviate their suffering, several leading artists were recalled from manual labour or freed from captivity under a Zhou initiative to decorate hotels and railway stations defaced by Red Guard slogans. Zhou said that the artworks were meant for foreigners, therefore were "outer" art and not under the obligations and restrictions placed on "inner" art meant for Chinese citizens. He claimed that landscape paintings should not be considered one of the "Four Olds". However, Zhou was weakened by cancer, and in 1974, the Jiang faction seized these and other paintings and mounted exhibitions in Beijing, Shanghai and other cities denouncing the artworks as Black Paintings.

Propaganda in posters was used as a mass communication device and often served as the people's leading source of information. They were produced in large numbers and widely disseminated to propagate ideological positions. The two main posters genres were the big-character poster or dazibao and commercial propaganda poster.

- The dazibao presented slogans, poems, commentary and graphics often posted on walls in public spaces, factories and communes. Mao wrote his own dazibao at Beijing University on 5 August 1966, calling on the people to "Bombard the Headquarters".
- Xuanchuanhua, or propaganda paintings, were artworks produced by the government and sold cheaply in stores to be displayed in homes or workplaces. The artists for these posters might be amateurs or uncredited professionals, and the posters were largely in a Socialist Realist visual style with specific conventions—for example, images of Mao were to be depicted as "red, smooth, and luminescent".

After decreasing in prominence throughout the 1980s, Cultural Revolution posters became prominent in public life again in the 1990s in connection with red tourism, as collectibles, in commercial advertising, and in contemporary art. In contemporary China, they continue to be reproduced in large amounts and sold commercially. Historic posters have been the subject of exhibitions and auctions, including in the United States and Europe.

Before the Cultural Revolution, relatively few cultural productions reflected the lives of peasants and workers; during it, the struggles of workers, peasants, and revolutionary soldiers became frequent artistic subjects, often created by peasants and workers themselves. Among the most prominent examples of this style included the peasant paintings of Huxian. In the early 1970s, worker, peasant, and soldier-created art was promoted as the paradigm of socialist art. The spread of peasant paintings in rural China, for example, became one of the newborn things celebrated in a socialist society.

==== Literature ====
Literature adapted the aesthetic themes from the model works, such as the "three prominences". Applied in the literary context, the principle of the three prominences was that texts should demonstrate the struggle between revolutionary and reactionary forces in a stark and dichotomous manner. Other literary trends during the period included the integration of modern style and local traditions (such as clappertalk) and poetry-style dramatic dialogues.

During the Cultural Revolution, the long-form novel was an emphasized form of literature. Among the major genres were novels about the experiences of sent-down youth. These included novels written by sent-down youths themselves, such as Zhang Kangkang's 1975 novel Dividing Line and Zhang Changgong's 1973 novel Youth.

Literary works by amateurs, such as factory workers, spread during the Cultural Revolution. Among the amateur writers who became prominent during the Cultural Revolution was Duan Ruixia for the 1973 short story, Not Just One of the Audience.

Writing about the romantic relationships of revolutionary martyrs became one of the taboo topics during the Cultural Revolution.

A large amount of poetry was published during the Cultural Revolution; it proliferated in non-traditional literary avenues like newspapers, performances, and Red Guard pamphlets.

==== Film ====
The Four Hundred Films to be Criticized booklet was distributed, and film directors and actors/actresses were criticized with some tortured and imprisoned. These included many of Jiang Qing's rivals and former friends. Those who died in the period included Cai Chusheng, Zheng Junli, Shangguan Yunzhu, Wang Ying, and Xu Lai. No feature films were produced in mainland China for seven years apart from a few approved "Model dramas" and highly ideological films. A notable example is Taking Tiger Mountain by Strategy. China rejected Hollywood films and most foreign films. Albanian films and North Korean films developed mass audiences in China. In 1972, Chinese officials invited Michelangelo Antonioni to China to film the achievements of the Cultural Revolution. Antonioni made the documentary Chung Kuo, Cina. When it was released in 1974, CCP leadership in China interpreted the film as reactionary and anti-Chinese. Viewing art through the principles of the Yan'an Talks, particularly the concept that there is no such thing as art-for-art's-sake, party leadership construed Antonioni's aesthetic choices as politically motivated and banned the film.

Mobile film units brought Chinese cinema to the countryside and were crucial to the standardization and popularization of culture during this period, particularly including revolutionary model operas. During the Cultural Revolution's early years, mobile film teams traveled to rural areas with news reels of Mao meeting with Red Guards and Tiananmen Square parades, which became known as "red treasure films". The release of the filmed versions of the revolutionary model operas resulted in a re-organization and expansion of China's film exhibition network. From 1965 to 1976, the number of film projection units in China quadrupled, total film audiences nearly tripled, and the national film attendance rate doubled. The Cultural Revolution Group drastically reduced ticket prices which, in its view, would allow film to better serve the needs of workers and of socialism.

=== Historical sites ===
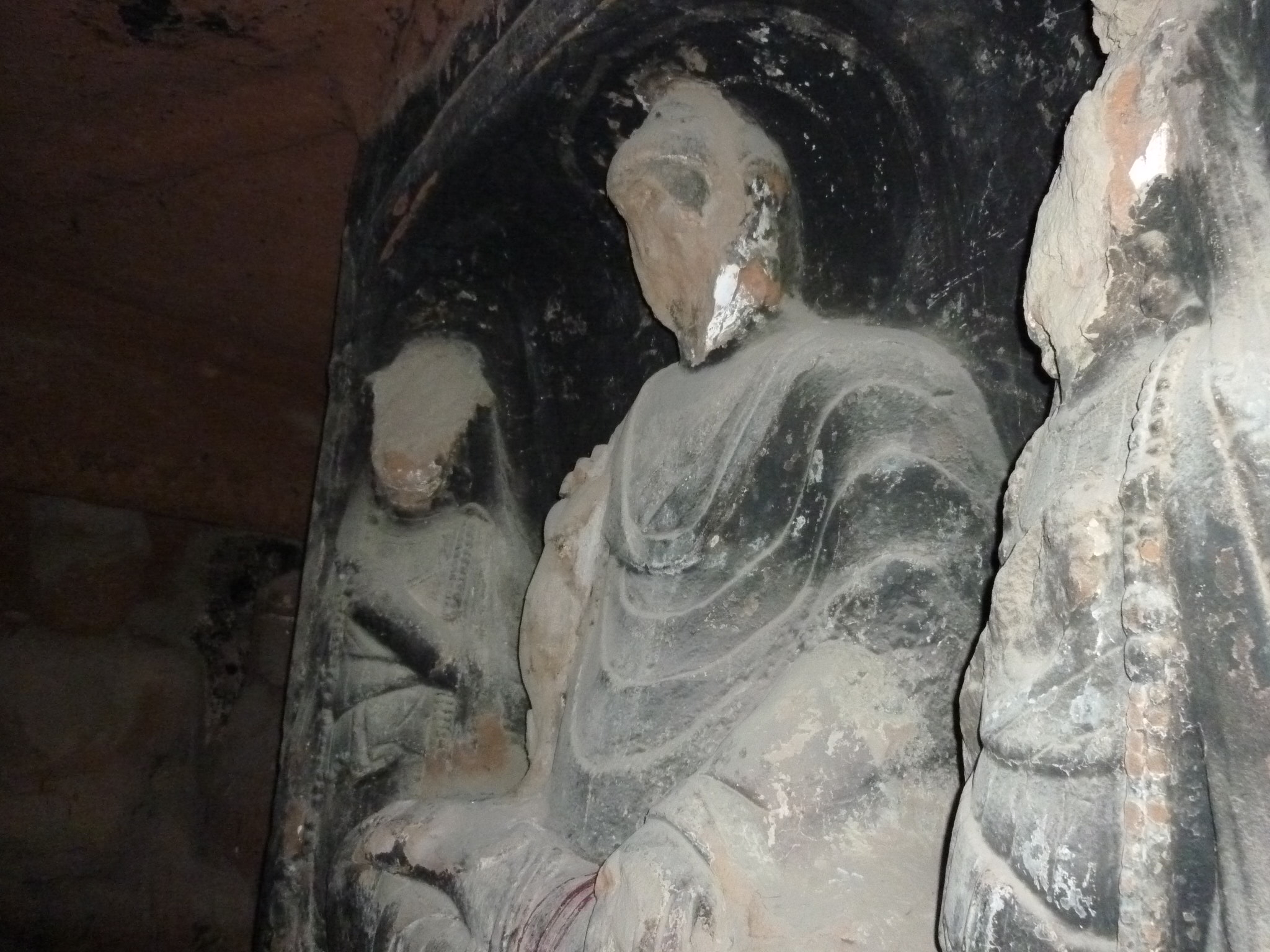
Buddhist statues defaced during the Cultural Revolution

China's historical sites, artifacts and archives suffered devastating damage, as they were thought to be at the root of "old ways of thinking". Artifacts were seized, museums and private homes ransacked, and any item found that was thought to represent bourgeois or feudal ideas was destroyed. Few records relate how much was destroyed—Western observers suggest that much of China's thousands of years of history was in effect destroyed, or, later, smuggled abroad for sale. Chinese historians compare the suppression to Qin Shi Huang's great Confucian purge. Religious persecution intensified during this period, as religion was viewed in opposition to Marxist–Leninist and Maoist thinking.

The destruction of historical relics was never formally sanctioned by the Party, whose official policy was instead to protect such items. On 14 May 1967, the Central Committee issued Several suggestions for the protection of cultural relics and books during the Cultural Revolution. Despite this, enormous damage was inflicted on China's cultural heritage. For example, a survey in 1972 in Beijing of 18 cultural heritage sites, including the Temple of Heaven and Ming Tombs, showed extensive damage. Of the 80 cultural heritage sites in Beijing under municipal protection, 30 were destroyed, and of the 6,843 cultural sites under protection by Beijing government decision in 1958, 4,922 were damaged or destroyed. Numerous valuable old books, paintings, and other cultural relics were burnt.

Later archaeological excavation and preservation after the destructive period were protected, and several significant discoveries, such as the Terracotta Army and the Mawangdui, occurred after the peak of the Revolution. Nevertheless, the most prominent medium of academic research in archaeology, the journal Kaogu, did not publish. After the most violent phase, the attack on traditional culture continued in 1973 with the Anti-Lin Biao, Anti-Confucius Campaign as part of the struggle against moderate Party elements.

=== Household items ===
During the Cultural Revolution, household goods were frequently imprinted with quotations by Mao, red hearts, and the character for loyalty (忠) as part of the call to "revolutionize the environment."

The policy of "four things enter the room" encouraged households to display Quotations from Chairman Mao Zedong, quotation banners, poster of Mao, and a red flag.

=== Media ===
During the early period of the Cultural Revolution, freedom of the press in China was at its peak. While the number of newspapers declined in this period, the number of independent publications by mass political organizations grew. According to China's National Bureau of Statistics, the number of newspapers dropped from 343 in 1965, to 49 in 1966, and then to a 20th-century low of 43 in 1967. At the same time, the number of publications by mass organizations such as Red Guards grew to an estimated number as high as 10,000.

Independent political groups could publish broadsheets and handbills, as well as leaders' speeches and meeting transcripts which would normally have been considered highly classified. From 1966 to 1969, at least 5,000 new broadsheets by independent political groups were published. Several Red Guard organizations also operated independent printing presses to publish newspapers, articles, speeches, and big-character posters. For example, the largest student organization in Shanghai, the Red Revolutionaries, established a newspaper that had a print run of 800,000 copies by the end of 1966. Michael Schoenhals writes that one of the most striking features of the Cultural Revolution is the spread of publications by "revolutionary mass organizations" in 1966 and 1967, reflecting a plurality of values and opinions in society at odds with conventional stereotypes about Red Guards.

== Foreign relations ==
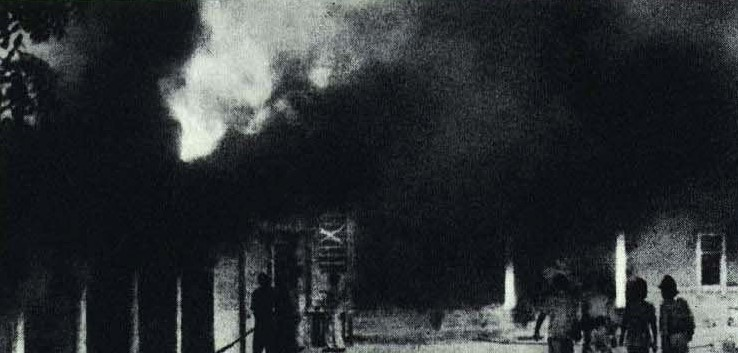
The Embassy of China, Jakarta after being burned

The functions of China's embassies abroad were disrupted during the early part of the Cultural Revolution. In a 22 March 1969 meeting on the Sino-Soviet border clashes, Mao stated that in foreign relations, China was "now isolated" and "we need to relax a little". Later that year, China began to restore its embassies to normal functioning.

However, the Sino-Soviet conflict culminated in 1969, and according to declassified documents from both China and the United States, the Soviet Union planned to launch a large-scale nuclear strike on China after the Zhenbao Island incident in 1969. The planned targets include Beijing, Changchun, Anshan and China's missile-launch centers of Jiuquan, Xichang and Lop Nur. This crisis almost led to a major nuclear war, seven years after the Cuban missile crisis. Eventually, the Soviets called off the attack due to the intervention from the United States.

China exported communist revolutions as well as communist ideologies to multiple countries in Southeast Asia, supporting parties in Indonesia, Malaysia, Vietnam, Laos, Myanmar and the Khmer Rouge in Cambodia. It is estimated that at least 90% of the Khmer Rouge's foreign aid came from China. In 1975 alone at least US$1 billion in interest-free economic and military aid and US$20 million came from China. China's economic malaise impacted China's ability to assist North Vietnam in its war against South Vietnam by the 1970s, which cooled relations between the once allied nations.

== Evaluations ==
On 27 June 1981, the Central Committee of the Chinese Communist Party adopted the Resolution on Certain Questions in the History of Our Party Since the Founding of the People's Republic of China, an official assessment of major historical events since 1949. The Resolution declared that the Cultural Revolution was "responsible for the most severe setback and the heaviest losses suffered by the people, the country, and the party since the founding of the People's Republic."

After the Cultural Revolution, a massive social and cultural movement known as the New Enlightenment took place in mainland China since the late 1970s. The movement lasted throughout the 1980s, and opposed the ideology of Cultural Revolution and feudalism. The New Enlightenment movement ended due to the Tiananmen Square protests and massacre in June 1989. After Deng Xiaoping's southern tour in early 1992, however, intellectuals in mainland China became divided and formed two major schools of thought, the Liberalism and the New Left, which held different views on the Cultural Revolution.

To this day, public discussion of the Cultural Revolution is still limited within mainland China. The Chinese government continues to prohibit news organizations from mentioning details, and online discussions and books about the topic are subject to official scrutiny. Publications about perspectives of victims are prohibited. Textbooks abide by the "official view" of the events. Many government documents from the 1960s onward remain classified. Despite inroads by prominent sinologists, independent scholarly research is discouraged. Discussion of the Cultural Revolution has become further proscribed, involving censorship of certain themes, under the general secretaryship of Xi Jinping.

Mao Zedong's legacy remains in some dispute. During the anniversary of his birth, many people viewed Mao as a godlike figure and referred to him as "the people's great savior". Contemporary discussions in the CCP-owned tabloid Global Times continue to glorify Mao. Rather than focus on consequences, state media newspapers claim that revolutions typically have a brutal side and are unable to be viewed from the "humanitarian perspective". Critics of Mao Zedong look at the actions that occurred under his leadership from the point of view that "he was better at conquering power than at ruling the country and developing a socialist economy". Mao went to extreme measures on his path to power, costing millions of lives then and during his rule.

== See also ==
- Arson attacks on the British Chargé d'affaires Office
- Cultural and Ideological Revolution
- History of the Chinese Communist Party
- History of the People's Republic of China
- List of campaigns of the Chinese Communist Party
- Maoism
- Marxism–Leninism–Maoism
- Marxist cultural analysis
- Mass killings under communist regimes
