= History of China (1949–1976) =

China during the Mao Zedong era

Mao era
- 1949–1976
Chinese Civil War	Hua & Deng eras
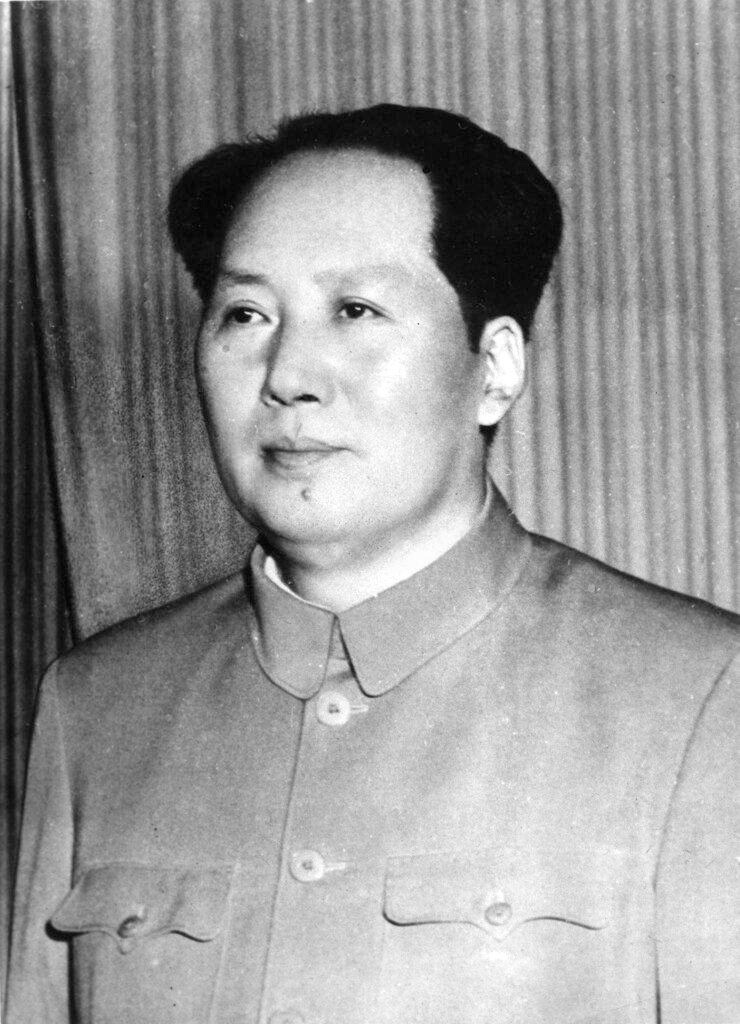
- Location: China
- Including: Cold War
- Leader: Mao Zedong
- President(s): Mao Zedong; Liu Shaoqi; Soong Ching-ling (acting); Dong Biwu (acting)
- Prime Minister: Zhou Enlai
- Key events: Proclamation of the People's Republic of China; First Indochina War; Korean War; Great Leap Forward; Cultural Revolution; Vietnam War

The time period in China from the founding of the People's Republic in 1949 until Mao's death in 1976 is commonly known as Maoist China or the Mao era. The history of the People's Republic of China is often divided distinctly by historians into the Mao era and the post-Mao era. The country's Mao era lasted from the founding of the people's republic on October 1, 1949 to Deng Xiaoping's consolidation of power and policy reversal at the Third plenary session of the 11th Central Committee of the Chinese Communist Party on December 22, 1978. The Mao era focuses on Mao Zedong's social movements from the early 1950s on, including land reform, the Great Leap Forward and the Cultural Revolution. The Great Chinese Famine, one of the worst famines in human history, occurred during this era.

== 1949: Proclamation of the People's Republic of China ==
The First Plenary Session of the Chinese People's Political Consultative Conference (CPPCC) opened in Beijing on September 21, 1949. It consisted of 662 delegates from diverse backgrounds, including the CPC, various democratic parties, people's organizations, the People's Liberation Army, different ethnic groups, and overseas Chinese. In his opening speech, Mao Zedong famously proclaimed that "the Chinese people, comprising one-quarter of humanity, have now stood up."

The CPPCC unanimously adopted the Common Program as the basic political program for the country following the Chinese Communist Party's victory in the Chinese Civil War. The conference also made several historic decisions regarding the symbols of the new republic: it designated Beijing as the capital, adopted the Gregorian calendar, selected the Five-Star Red Flag as the national flag and "March of the Volunteers" as the provisional national anthem.

The founding of the People's Republic of China (PRC) was formally proclaimed by Mao Zedong, the Chairman of the Chinese Communist Party, on October 1, 1949, at 3:00 pm in Tiananmen Square in Beijing. The establishment of the Central People's Government of the PRC, the government of the new nation, was officially declared during the proclamation speech at the founding ceremony. A military parade took place during the foundation ceremony.

== Early 1950s: Social revolution ==
The People's Republic of China was founded on a land that was ravaged by a century of foreign invasion and civil wars. Both urban and rural communities, as well as both agriculture and industry, experienced significant growth between 1949 and 1959. Mao's government carried out land reform, instituted collectivisation and implemented the laogai camp system.

In 1949, Mao Zedong declared that the nation would "lean to one side", meaning that the Soviet Union and the communist bloc would be its principal allies. Three months after the PRC was established in October 1949, Mao and his delegation traveled to Moscow. They were not received warmly by Stalin, who doubted if they really were Marxist-Leninists and not simply a group of Chinese nationalists. He had also recognized Chiang Kai-Shek's government, and furthermore distrusted any communist movement that was not under his direct control. After a meeting with Mao, the Soviet leader remarked "What sort of a man is Mao? He seems to have some idea of revolution involving the peasants, but not the workers." Eventually, a frustrated Mao was ready to go home, but Zhou Enlai refused to leave without a formal agreement. Thus, the Sino-Soviet Treaty of Mutual Friendship was signed and the Chinese at last departed in February 1950.

=== Campaign to Suppress Counterrevolutionaries ===
According to Chinese historians, between January and October 1950, there were over 800 counter-revolutionary riots nationwide, and that more than 40,000 political activists and masses of cadres were killed as a result. The government alleged that in Guangxi Province alone, counter-revolutionaries burned and destroyed more than 25,000 buildings and stole over 200,000 head of cattle.

In July and October 1950, instructions were issued to emphasize the policy of "Combining Suppression with Leniency" (镇压与宽大相结合). This strategy followed the principle: "The chief criminals must be punished, those who were coerced shall go unpunished, and those who perform meritorious service shall be rewarded". On February 21, 1951, the government officially promulgated the "Regulations of the People's Republic of China on the Punishment of Counter-revolutionaries. The campaign focused primarily on eliminating underground KMT agents, and also on eliminating secret societies, criminal gangs, and religious sects.

By the time the large-scale movement concluded in late 1951, the authorities had solved over 600 major spy cases and brought to justice the executioners responsible for the deaths of famous revolutionaries like Li Dazhao and Zhao Yiman.

=== Economic and social reforms ===
At the time of the PRC's founding in 1949, land reform had not yet been carried out in areas comprising about two-thirds of the national territory, home to a rural population of approximately 290 million people. Poor peasants and farm laborers, who accounted for over 57% of rural households, owned only about 14% of the arable land. In June 1950, Liu Shaoqi presented a report on land reform issues at the 3rd Plenary Session of the 7th CPC Central Committee. Subsequently, on June 30, 1950, Chairman Mao Zedong signed the Land Reform Law of the People's Republic of China. By 1953, land reform had been completed in mainland China with the exception of Xinjiang, Tibet, Qinghai, and Sichuan. The campaign resulted in hundreds of millions of peasants receiving a plot of land for the first time. Approximately 300 million peasants who had little or no land received about 700 million mu (approx. 47 million hectares) of land, along with other means of production such as draft animals and tools confiscated from landlords.

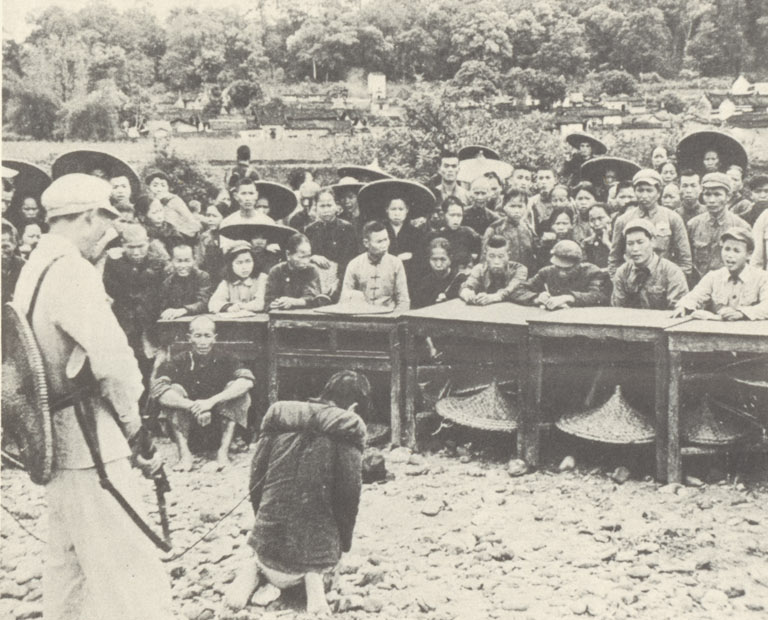
A wealthy farmer in front a Chinese Communist "people's court" in Fogang County, Guangdong Province on July 23, 1952

The state confiscated enterprises owned by the "four big families" (Chiang, Soong, Kung, and Chen). By 1952, the state economy controlled vital sectors, including 80% of heavy industry (power, coal, steel), 100% of railways, and the entire banking system. By 1952, China's state-owned enterprises accounted for more than 40% of industrial production. By 1952 price stability had been established, commerce had been restored, and industry and agriculture had regained their previous peak levels of production. By 1953, China had rapidly recovered its economy.

The new Marriage Law was passed on April 13, 1950, being the first basic law enacted by the People's Republic of China. It strictly prohibited arranged or forced marriages, the superiority of men over women, and the neglect of children's interests. The law also banned bigamy, concubinage, and child brides (the practice of raising a young girl in the home of her future husband).

The government took drastic measures to shut down brothels and ban opium and gambling. On 21 November 1949, all 224 of Beijing's establishments were shut down; 1286 prostitutes and 434 owners, procurers, and pimps were arrested in the space of 12 hours by an estimated 2400 cadres. Nationwide, more than 8,400 brothels were shut down. By 1952, the drug problem—a scourge for a century—was essentially eradicated through a combination of strict enforcement and rehabilitation.

The Thought Reform Movement began in September 1951, following a speech by premier Zhou Enlai calling for intellectuals to reform their thought. The People's Daily called for teachers and college staff to "arm oneself with the thought of Marxism–Leninism" and to "throw away the vulgar perspectives of individualism and liberalism, and the cultural thought of European-American reactionary bourgeoisie". Mao Zedong officially endorsed the movement in October 1951, stating that "ideological remolding, especially of all types of intellectuals, is one of the important conditions for our country to realize democratic reform and industrialization". By the end of 1952, the movement had spread from Beijing and Tianjin to the entire country, involving the fields of culture, art, and science. Intellectuals were organized into various forms of study activities to learn political theories and the new state's policies, they were also required to examine their past actions and thoughts publicly, admitting to "incorrect" class stances or "bourgeois" tendencies.

The Three-Anti campaign officially began in December 1951, emerging from the broader "Increase Production and Practice Economy" movement that had been initiated to support the national effort in the Korean War. This campaign specifically targeted members of the Communist Party, government officials, and workers in state factories. Its primary goals were to oppose corruption (贪污), waste (浪费), and bureaucracy (官僚主义). By the time the movement concluded in October 1952, approximately 1.2 million people had been investigated, and over 100,000 were disciplined for varying degrees of corruption. Building directly on the revelations of the Three-Anti campaign, the government launched the Five-Anti campaign in January 1952. Investigations into corrupt officials had frequently exposed illegal dealings with private business owners, prompting a need to regulate the "national bourgeoisie". This second movement targeted private industrial and commercial sectors to eliminate five specific "poisons": bribery (行贿), tax evasion (偷税漏税), theft of state property (盗骗国家财产), cheating on government contracts (偷工减料), and the theft of state economic information (盗窃国家经济情报). The government mobilized the working class to supervise their employers, uniting with law-abiding capitalists while isolating and punishing the "law-breaking" elements who had exploited the state's resources during the war effort.

=== New Democracy ===
After 1949, China operated under the "Common Program," which established New Democracy as the political basis for building the country. This stage aimed to complete the first step of the revolution: transforming a backward agricultural, semi-colonial, and semi-feudal country into an independent industrial one, creating the necessary material and cultural prerequisites before advancing to socialism. The New Democratic economy was characterized by the simultaneous coexistence of five economic sectors: the state-owned economy (socialist nature), the cooperative economy (semi-socialist nature), the private capitalist economy, the individual economy (peasants and handicraftsmen), and the state-capitalist economy.

Originally, Chinese leaders anticipated that the New Democracy period would last a long time to build national strength. The overall strategy was summarized by the slogan "three years of preparation, ten years of construction". Mao Zedong remarked in 1949 that the transition to socialism might require 20 to 30 years. Liu Shaoqi, in reports from 1951, emphasized the task was to "struggle for the consolidation of the New Democratic system" and viewed the transition to socialism as a matter for the distant future, at least after ten years of industrial construction.

Despite the initial plan to maintain New Democracy for the long term, Mao Zedong changed his mind starting in the autumn of 1952. Mao feared that a prolonged New Democratic system would allow the private capitalist economy and the "spontaneous tendencies" of peasants toward capitalism to grow too strong, making later socialist transformation more difficult. As a result, he decided to begin the transition to socialism immediately rather than waiting 10–15 years.

=== Socialist transformation ===
Initially, the Chinese Communist Party (CCP) anticipated that the New Democracy period—with its multi-sector economy—would last 10 to 15 years, or even 20 to 30 years, to prepare the material prerequisites for socialism. However, in the autumn of 1952, Mao Zedong shifted this policy, deciding to begin the transition to socialism immediately rather than waiting. Lin Yunhui identifies this as a strategic pivot from an "indirect transition" (allowing capitalism to develop to a certain extent to build a foundation) to a "direct transition" (abolishing private ownership to build public ownership immediately).

The transition was formalized by the formula "One body, two wings": the "body" was socialist industrialization, and the "two wings" were the three major transformations (targeting agriculture, handicrafts, and capitalist industry and commerce). The core objective was to make socialist ownership the sole economic foundation of the nation.

By June 1952, Mao asserted that the contradiction between the working class and the national bourgeoisie had become the primary internal contradiction of the country.

==== Three major transformations ====
The socialist transformation of agriculture, also known as the "Agricultural Cooperativization Movement," involved establishing cooperatives modeled after the Soviet Union. Beginning in December 1951, the Central Committee of the Chinese Communist Party issued a series of resolutions defining the general line, guiding principles, and policies for the country's agricultural socialist transformation. This movement generally unfolded in three stages. The first stage, spanning from October 1949 to 1953, focused primarily on organizing "Mutual Aid Teams" while simultaneously piloting elementary forms of agricultural cooperatives. The second stage, from 1954 to the first half of 1955, saw the widespread establishment and development of "Elementary Cooperatives" across China. In mid-1955, a divergence of opinion emerged within the CCP regarding whether to slow down or accelerate the pace of cooperativization, ultimately resulting in the implementation of Mao Zedong's policy of acceleration. Consequently, the third stage, covering the second half of 1955 to the end of 1956, marked the period of the most rapid advancement. By the end of 1956, having progressed through the three levels of "Mutual Aid Teams," "Elementary Cooperatives," and "Advanced Cooperatives," the socialist transformation of agriculture was basically completed, with 96.3% of peasant households nationwide having joined cooperatives.

The socialist transformation of handicrafts began in November 1953 and concluded at the end of 1956, with more than 90% of handicraft workers nationwide joining cooperatives.

The socialist transformation of capitalist industry and commerce was comprehensively carried out from 1954 to the end of 1956. The CCP adopted a policy of "peaceful redemption," utilizing forms of state capitalism to gradually transform these industries into socialist public ownership enterprises, while also "combining the transformation of ownership with the transformation of individuals, striving to turn exploiters into laborers earning their own living.

=== Diplomatic policy ===
China explicitly declared its alignment with the Soviet-led socialist camp amidst the global bipolar confrontation of that era. Mao Zedong asserted that this conclusion was drawn from "the 40 years of experience of Sun Yat-sen and the 28 years of experience of the Communist Party of China". He argued that China had only two choices: to lean either toward the side of imperialism or toward the side of socialism, and that there was no "third road."

The Soviet Union was the first nation to recognize the PRC on October 2, 1949, and this partnership was solidified on February 14, 1950, with the signing of the Sino-Soviet Treaty of Friendship, Alliance, and Mutual Assistance during Mao Zedong and Zhou Enlai's visit to Moscow. This treaty provided China with a security guarantee and a $300 million loan to support economic recovery and industrialization. It also included agreements for the Soviet Union to transfer its rights over the Changchun Railway and the naval base at Lüshun back to China. Simultaneously, China established diplomatic relations with other communist nations and several neutral countries, including India, Pakistan, Indonesia, Burma, Sweden, and Switzerland.

A major objective of this era was the recovery of national sovereignty and the elimination of imperialist vestiges. The government successfully reclaimed control over customs management, recovered rights over inland navigation, and abolished the rights of foreign powers to station troops on Chinese soil. Furthermore, China took over or transformed foreign-subsidized missionary schools and cultural organizations to ensure educational and ideological independence. When Western powers, led by the United States, imposed economic blockades, the PRC responded by seizing or controlling foreign-owned assets within its borders.

== Korean War ==
China's role in the Korean war has been evaluated by each participant in sharply different ways. Soon after its founding, the newly born People's Republic of China was drawn into its first international conflict. On June 25, 1950, Kim Il Sung's North Korean forces crossed the 38th parallel, invaded South Korea, and eventually advanced as far as the Pusan Perimeter in south-east Korea. United Nations forces entered the war on side of the South, and American General Douglas MacArthur, having forced a Communist retreat, proposed to end the war by Christmas 1950. The Soviet Union and China saw a UN (and consequently, American) victory as a major political victory to the United States, a prospect seen as dangerous in the beginnings of the Cold War. However, Stalin had no desire to go to war with the United States, and left China the responsibility of saving the regime in Pyongyang. Up to this time, the Truman Administration was thoroughly disgusted with the corruption of Chiang Kai-shek's government and considered simply recognizing the PRC. On June 27, the US 7th Fleet was sent to the Taiwan Straits both to prevent a Communist invasion of the island and to prevent an attempted reconquest of the mainland. China meanwhile warned that it would not accept a US-backed Korea on its border.

After the UN forces liberated Seoul in September, Beijing countered by saying that ROK troops could cross into North Korea, but not American ones. MacArthur ignored this, believing that the South Korean army was too weak to attack on its own. After Pyongyang fell in October, the UN troops approached the strategically sensitive Yalu River area. China responded by sending waves of troops south, in what became known as the People's Volunteers in order to disassociate them from the PLA. The Chinese army was poorly equipped but contained many veterans of the civil war and the conflict with Japan. In addition, it possessed huge reserves of manpower.

The United States was on its way to the height of military power, and historians contend that Mao's participation in the war asserted China as a new power to not be taken lightly. Known as the Resist America, Aid Korea Campaign in China, the first major offensive of the Chinese forces was pushed back in October, but by Christmas 1950, the "People's Volunteer Army" under the command of Gen. Peng Dehuai had forced the United Nations to retreat back to the 38th Parallel. However, the war was very costly to the Chinese side, as more than just "volunteers" were mobilised, and because of the lack of experience in modern warfare and the lack of modern military technology, China's casualties vastly outnumbered that of the United Nations. On April 11, 1951, a U.S. Seventh Fleet destroyer approached close to the port of Swatow (Shantou), on the southeast coast of China, provoking China to send an armada of more than forty armed powered junks to confront and surround the destroyer for nearly five hours before the destroyer departed the area without either side widening the conflict by initiating hostile fire. Declining a UN armistice, the two sides fought intermittently on both sides of the 38th Parallel until the armistice was signed on July 27, 1953. The Korean War ended any possibility of normalised relations with the United States for years. Meanwhile, Chinese forces invaded and annexed Tibet in October 1950. Tibet had been nominally subject to the Chinese emperors in past centuries, but declared its independence in 1912.

Under Mao's direction, China built its first atomic bomb in its nuclear program, Project 596, testing it on October 16, 1964, at Lop Nor; it was the fifth country to conduct a successful nuclear test.

== 1953–1957 ==
The Korean War had been enormously costly to China, especially coming on the heels of the civil war, and it delayed postwar reconstruction.

According to Hua-yu Li, writing in Mao and the Economic Stalinization of China, 1948–1953 in 1953, Mao, misled by glowing reports in History of the Communist Party of the Soviet Union (Bolshevik): Short Course, authorized by Stalin of social and economic progress in the Soviet Union, abandoned the liberal economic programs of "New Democracy" and instituted the "general line for socialist transition", a program to build socialism based on Soviet models. He was reportedly moved in part by personal and national rivalry with Stalin and the Soviet Union.

The Soviet Union provided considerable economic aid and training during the 1950s. Many Chinese students were sent to study in Moscow. Factories and other infrastructure projects were all based on Soviet designs, for China was an agrarian country with little established industry. In 1953, Mao Zedong told the Indonesian ambassador that they had little to export except agricultural products. Several jointly owned Sino-Soviet corporations were established, but Mao considered these to impinge on Chinese sovereignty and in 1954 they were quietly dissolved.

Economically, the country followed up on the Soviet model of five-year plans with its own first five-year plan from 1953 to 1957. The country went through a transformation whereby means of production were transferred from private to public entities, and through nationalization of industry in 1955, the state controlled the economy in a similar fashion to the economy of the Soviet Union.

By 1956, Mao was becoming bored with the day-to-day running of the state and also worried about growing red tape and bureaucracy. The 8th CCP Congress that year declared that socialism had more-or-less been established and so the next few years would be devoted to rest and consolidation.

In February 1957, Mao gave one of his most famous addresses in which he said, "Let a hundred flowers bloom, let a hundred schools of thought contend." The Hundred Flowers Campaign was promoted by the CCP as a way of furthering socialist ideology through open debate, but many took it as an invitation to express open disdain for the CCP. Many began to voice their opposition to the Party-State's rule. Thoroughly shocked, Mao put an end to this and then launched the Anti-Rightist Campaign. Scores of intellectuals and common workers were purged, jailed, or disappeared. Many were not "rehabilitated" until the 1970s.

=== First five-year plan ===
Having restored a viable economic base, the leadership under Chairman Mao Zedong, Premier Zhou Enlai, and other revolutionary veterans sought to implement what they termed a socialist transformation of China. The First Five-Year Plan was deeply influenced by Soviet methodologies and assistance from Soviet planners.

At the heart of the plan were the "156 key projects" assisted by the Soviet Union, which provided both technical designs and equipment. To implement these projects, the Soviet Union sent more than 3,000 technical experts to provide direct guidance on everything from geological surveys and design to machinery installation and plant operation. During implementation, fierce debates arose within the Chinese leadership regarding the speed of development. Mao Zedong advocated criticizing right-deviationist conservatism, pushing for high speed with the slogan "More, faster, better, cheaper" (duo, kuai, hao, sheng), while economic leaders such as Zhou Enlai, Chen Yun, and Li Xiannian, recognizing serious imbalances (material shortages, financial tension), proposed the policy of "Opposing Rash Advance" (fan maojin) to maintain stability through comprehensive balance.

=== Gao-Rao affair ===
The Gao Gang and Rao Shushi Incident (often referred to as the Gao-Rao Case) was the first major internal power struggle within the high-level leadership of the CCP after the founding of the People's Republic. The conflict originated in 1949 regarding policies toward the bourgeoisie and rich peasants, when Gao Gang viewed Liu Shaoqi as holding "rightist" views for advocating the protection of the private economy and delaying collectivization. In contrast, Gao supported Mao Zedong's stance on rapidly advancing toward socialism.

In the early 1950s, Mao placed great trust in Gao Gang, appointing him Chairman of the State Planning Commission (often called the "Economic Cabinet"). At that time, Mao expressed private dissatisfaction with Liu Shaoqi to Gao, leading Gao to believe he had Mao's support to replace Liu. Gao leaked a list of Politburo members drafted by An Ziwen, the vice chief of the CCP Personnel Department, making Mao suspicious of Gao's intentions before the upcoming CCP Eighth Congress. While sources disagree on the reason for An's creation of the list, Gao mentioned and referred to the confidential document during meetings, believing that it was Liu's ploy to leverage his own position in the party. Gao had spoken to several other cadres about the matter including Chen Yun and Deng Xiaoping, who saw Gao's plan as an effort to overthrow Liu Shaoqi entirely.

When Gao Gang's lobbying activities were reported to Mao by Chen Yun and Deng Xiaoping, Mao recognized the threat to CCP unity. Despite having shared policy views with Gao, Mao chose to prioritize the unity of the CCP and sided with Liu Shaoqi. The 4th Plenary Session of the 7th CCP Central Committee (February 1954) passed the "Resolution on Strengthening Party Unity," which officially condemned the actions of Gao and Rao, though they were not named in the public communique. Feeling wronged, Gao Gang committed suicide in August 1954 after failed attempts to clear his name. In 1955, the National Party Congress officially concluded the existence of the "Gao-Rao Anti-Party Alliance" and expelled both from the CCP.

=== 1954 constitution and the social control system ===
The emergence of the National People's Congress (NPC) and the first Constitution in 1954 was not only the result of internal requirements but was also influenced by the international context, particularly Stalin's advice regarding the necessity of a formal constitution and public elections to consolidate the legitimacy of the government. Mao Zedong personally spent a significant amount of time in Hangzhou presiding over the drafting of this Constitution based on two core principles: Socialism and People's Democracy.

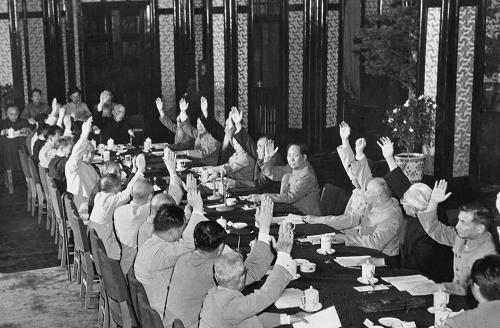
The Central People's Government Committee adopted the Draft of the Constitution of the People's Republic of China on June 14, 1954.

On December 1, 1952, the CCP Central Committee issued the "Notice on Convening a National Party Conference," which deemed that the conditions for convening the National People's Congress and formulating a constitution were already met, signaling the preparation for constitution-making. On December 24, 1952, at the 43rd meeting of the Standing Committee of the First National Committee of the Chinese People's Political Consultative Conference (CPPCC), Zhou Enlai, representing the CCP, proposed the drafting of a constitution; the CPPCC adopted this proposal. More than 150 million citizens participated in discussing the draft Constitution over a period of three months, providing over 1.18 million suggestions for modification and supplementation. Subsequently, on September 20, 1954, at the first session of the First National People's Congress, delegates cast a total of 1,197 votes, all of which were affirmative, unanimously adopting the "Constitution of the People's Republic of China".

By March 1953, 47 autonomous areas at or above the county level had been established nationwide. In addition to the Inner Mongolia Autonomous Region, preparations were underway to establish provincial-level autonomous regions such as Xinjiang and Ningxia, alongside the formation of the Preparatory Committee for the Tibet Autonomous Region in March 1955. By September 1956, two provincial-level autonomous regions (Inner Mongolia and Xinjiang), 27 autonomous prefectures, and 43 autonomous counties had been established nationwide. The state also prioritized investment in the construction of arterial railways and highways, such as the Sikang-Tibet and Qinghai-Tibet routes. Regarding social reforms in ethnic minority areas, the Party Central Committee emphasized a "cautious and steady" approach, allowing for more peaceful and moderate measures compared to Han-populated areas.

The nature of the ruling apparatus underwent a profound transformation, shifting from a coalition of democratic classes to a Proletarian Dictatorship. Concurrently, the CCP's leadership mechanism was adjusted toward centralized power through the abolition of intermediate levels such as the Party Group of the Government Administration Council, allowing the CCP Central Committee to provide more direct and close guidance to government departments. Notably, state control did not stop at the political superstructure but extended widely across society through a sophisticated management system designed to build a "Totalistic Society," where the state controlled nearly all scarce resources. This system operated based on key pillars such as the Danwei (Unit) system, which bound the lives of workers and staff to their workplace; the Hukou (Household Registration) system to control population movement and link individuals to the state food distribution system; and a confidential personnel dossier system to strictly manage each individual's political history.

=== Diplomatic policy ===
Following the Korean War, China focused its diplomatic efforts on breaking the US encirclement and isolation. The core of this strategic adjustment was Zhou Enlai's initial proposal of the Five Principles of Peaceful Coexistence in late 1953 during negotiations with India regarding Tibet; these principles included mutual respect for sovereignty and territorial integrity, mutual non-aggression, non-interference in each other's internal affairs, equality and mutual benefit, and peaceful coexistence. These principles were subsequently reaffirmed in joint statements with India and Burma in 1954.

The 1954 Geneva Conference marked the first time the People's Republic of China participated as one of the five major powers, where the Chinese delegation implemented a flexible strategy to promote an armistice agreement in Indochina, thereby isolating the pro-war faction of the US and securing the southern border.

At the Bandung Conference in 1955, despite facing an assassination plot involving the bombing of the "Kashmir Princess" aircraft, Zhou Enlai turned the tide with the guiding principle of "seeking common ground while reserving differences." (qiu tong cun yi) This approach successfully eased tensions and gained the trust of many neutral and pro-Western nations. Furthermore, China began promoting civil relations with Japan under the motto "people-to-people diplomacy leading the way to promote official relations," while also striving to improve ties with Western nations such as the United Kingdom and the Netherlands. Regarding the Taiwan issue, following military tensions in the strait and the signing of a mutual defense treaty between the US and Chiang Kai-shek, China took the initiative to declare its readiness to negotiate with the US to reduce conflict. This led to the establishment of the Sino-US Ambassadorial Talks in Geneva in August 1955.

China maintained that the liberation of Taiwan was an internal affair. Notable conflicts between the two sides during this period included the shelling of Kinmen and the Battle of Yijiangshan Islands.

When the crisis in Poland broke out in 1956, China supported Poland's demand for autonomy and opposed the Soviet Union's intention to use military measures to intervene in the country's internal affairs. Unlike Poland, the event in Hungary shifted from political demands to an uprising against the regime. Initially, China maintained a cautious attitude; however, upon recognizing the risk of Hungary breaking away from the socialist camp, they changed their stance and decisively urged the Soviet Union to deploy troops to suppress the uprising in order to safeguard the socialist system.

=== Military development ===
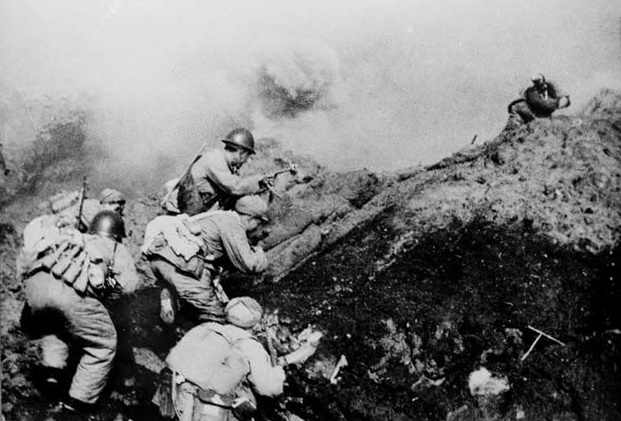
The Yijiangshan campaign was the first time in PLA history that the Army, Navy, and Air Force conducted a joint coordinated operation.

Mao Zedong emphasized that the nation needed a strong Air Force and Navy to prevent future "imperialist invasions". The military goal was to transition from a low-level, single-arm force (primarily infantry with basic equipment) to a high-level force featuring advanced weaponry and coordinated operations between multiple branches.

Mao Zedong issued a directive that total state expenditures for administration and defense should not exceed 30% of the national budget. To resolve this, Peng Dehuai and other military leaders implemented a strategy to prioritize the development of heavy industry (which serves as the foundation for defense) while simultaneously downsizing the regular army. The military performed deep personnel cuts, reducing the total force (including public security forces) to a steady level of 3.5 million personnel. The "Military Service Law" was officially passed by the National People's Congress in July 1955, replacing the previous volunteer-based service model. On January 1, 1955, the PLA officially adopted a formal wage structure, replacing the decades-old "provision system" (供给制), where the state had simply provided soldiers with basic necessities. A military rank system was also established through the "Regulations on the Service of Officers" and the "Regulations on Medals and Awards," both passed in February 1955.

A conferment ceremony was held in Beijing on September 27, 1955. During this event, Chairman Mao Zedong personally conferred the rank of Marshal of the People's Republic of China upon ten military leaders: Zhu De, Peng Dehuai, Lin Biao, Liu Bocheng, He Long, Chen Yi, Luo Ronghuan, Xu Xiangqian, Nie Rongzhen, and Ye Jianying.

The PLA established over 100 military colleges by 1953, including the Military Academy in Nanjing headed by Liu Bocheng. The modernization relied heavily on Soviet assistance. Between 1951 and 1954, the USSR provided equipment for 60 Chinese infantry divisions, along with thousands of aircraft (including MiG-15 fighters) and naval vessels. Soviet experts were also deeply involved in training Chinese personnel and establishing defense industries.

=== Language reform ===
The process of simplifying Chinese characters began in earnest in January 1955 when the China Writing Reform Committee released a draft proposal for public comment. Following this, the State Council officially promulgated the "Scheme for Simplifying Chinese Characters" in January 1956, which initially transformed 544 traditional characters into 515 simplified versions. Parallel to simplification, there were also initiatives aimed at eliminating the use of characters entirely and replacing them with pinyin as an official Chinese alphabet, but this possibility was abandoned, confirmed by a speech given by Zhou Enlai in 1958.

In tandem with written reforms, the government sought to unify the nation's diverse dialects by promoting putonghua (common speech). Following a State Council directive in February 1956, a massive pedagogical effort was launched to train educators; by the end of 1957, over 720,000 language teachers had been trained in the standardized dialect, and more than 2 million people had engaged with Putonghua lessons through national radio broadcasts. To support both literacy and standardized pronunciation, the Hanyu Pinyin Scheme was drafted in late 1957 and formally approved by the National People's Congress in 1958. Pinyin was then introduced to primary schools as a way to teach Standard Chinese pronunciation and used to improve the literacy rate among adults.

=== Hundred Flowers campaign ===
The "Hundred Flowers" policy was initially introduced in early 1956 as part of a broader effort to mobilize China's intellectual elite for the "march toward science". The original intent was to foster a more relaxed environment for scientific research and artistic creativity by reducing dogmatic adherence to Soviet models. This policy gained momentum after Khrushchev's secret speech criticizing Stalin at the XX Congress of the CPSU. Mao famously described the critique of Stalin as "opening the lid" (揭了盖子), which he saw as a positive step toward breaking the "superstition" of Soviet infallibility.

Following the 1956 crises in Poland and Hungary, the policy underwent a significant strategic shift. Mao became concerned that if the Party did not address internal social frustrations, a "Hungarian-style" uprising could occur in China. He transformed the "Hundred Flowers" from a cultural policy into a political one, launching the "Da Ming Da Fang" (Great Contending and Great Blooming). He explicitly invited non-Party members and intellectuals to criticize the Party's "three evils": bureaucracy, sectarianism, and subjectivism.

Critics began to question the one-party system, the absolute leadership of the CCP, and the basic tenets of the socialist state. Sensing a threat to his authority and the stability of the regime, Mao pivoted toward a strategy he later called "drawing the snakes out of their caves", and the Hundred Flowers movement was shut down in favor of the Anti-Rightist Movement by mid-1957.

=== Anti-Rightist campaign ===
As the "Da Ming Da Fang" movement progressed in the spring of 1957, the level of criticism surpassed what the CCP leadership had anticipated. Consequently, Mao Zedong decided to break his promise and launch a counterattack. In 1957, the CCP began its retaliatory actions, which later became known as the "Anti-Rightist Movement". Those labeled as "Rightists" faced severe consequences, including public humiliation, loss of employment, imprisonment, or being sent to re-education through labor (laogai) in remote rural areas. A number of people were executed. This campaign completely extinguished the atmosphere of free thought, forced intellectuals into a state of submission, and pushed China back toward an era of radical class struggle.

== 1958-1965 ==
Leading into the Great Leap Forward, China experienced a population boom that strained its food supply, despite rising agricultural yields. Increased yields could not keep pace a population that benefitted from a major decrease in mortality (due to successful public health campaigns and the end of war) and high fertility rate.The Chinese government recognized the country's dilemma of feeding its rapidly growing population without the means to make significant capital improvements in agriculture. Viewing human labor as an underutilized factor of production, the government intensified the mobilization of masses of people to increase labor inputs in agriculture.

Under Mao's leadership, China broke with the Soviet model and announced a new economic program, the "Great Leap Forward", in 1958, aimed at rapidly raising industrial and agricultural production. Specific to industrial production, Mao announced the goal of surpassing the steel production output of Great Britain by 1968. Giant cooperatives, otherwise known as people's communes, were formed. Within a year almost all Chinese villages had been reformed into working communes of several thousand people in size, where people would live and work together as envisioned by an ideal communist society. Rather than build steel mills, small "backyard furnaces" would be used.

The results, however, were disastrous. Normal market mechanisms were disrupted, agricultural production fell behind, and people exhausted themselves producing shoddy, unsellable goods. Because of the reliance on the government providing and distributing food and resources and their rapid depletion due to poor planning, starvation appeared even in fertile agricultural areas. From 1960 to 1961, the combination of poor planning during the Great Leap Forward, political movements incited by the government, as well as unusual weather patterns and natural disasters resulted in widespread famine and many deaths. A significant number of the deaths were not from famine but were killed or overworked by the authorities. According to various sources, the resulting death toll was likely between 20 and 40 million. The steel produced in backyard furnaces at low temperatures proved to be useless. Finally, the peasants hated the lack of privacy and the militarization of their lives.

The already strained Sino-Soviet relationship deteriorated sharply in 1959, when the Soviets started to restrict the flow of scientific and technological information to China. The dispute escalated, and the Soviets withdrew all of their personnel from China by August 1960, leaving many construction projects dormant. In the same year, the Soviets and the Chinese began to have disputes openly in international forums. The relationship between the two powers reached a low point in 1969 with the Sino-Soviet border conflict, when Soviet and Chinese troops met in combat on the Manchurian border.

=== Three Red Banners ===
In 1958, the Chinese leadership launched three sweeping policy directives known as the "Three Red Banners" to accelerate the transition to communism and overtake the leading industrial powers in economic output. These policies consisted of the General Line for Socialist Construction, the Great Leap Forward, and the People's Commune Movement.

==== General Line for Socialist Construction ====
The concept of a "faster" path to communism began to form in Mao Zedong's mind as early as 1955, following his criticism of conservative "rightist" tendencies in agricultural cooperation. Mao believed there were two competing methods for construction: one that was "greater, faster, better, and more economical" and another that was "less, slower, worse, and more wasteful". In 1956, leaders like Zhou Enlai and Chen Yun had advocated for "steady progress" and "comprehensive balance" to prevent economic overheating. But Mao later characterized this "anti-rash advance" (fan maojin) as a political error that dampened the enthusiasm of the masses. At the Chengdu Conference (March 1958), Mao explicitly defined "rash advance" as Marxist and "anti-rash advance" as non-Marxist.

The General Line was officially established during the Second Session of the 8th National Congress of the CPC held in May 1958. It was defined by the slogan: "Go all out, aim high, and build communism with more, faster, better, and more economical results" (鼓足干劲、力争上游、多快好省地建设社会主义), replacing the more gradual "General Line for the Transition Period" from 1953.

A core motivation behind the General Line was the desire to catch up with and surpass developed Western nations. Mao initially proposed catching up with the United Kingdom in 15 years in terms of steel and industrial output. However, as the radical atmosphere intensified during 1958, these timelines were repeatedly shortened. By June 1958, under the influence of exaggerated local reports, Mao suggested it might take only 2 to 3 years to surpass the UK.

==== Great Leap Forward ====
The Great Leap Forward campaign began during the period of the Second Five Year Plan which was scheduled to run from 1958 to 1963, though the campaign itself was discontinued by 1961.

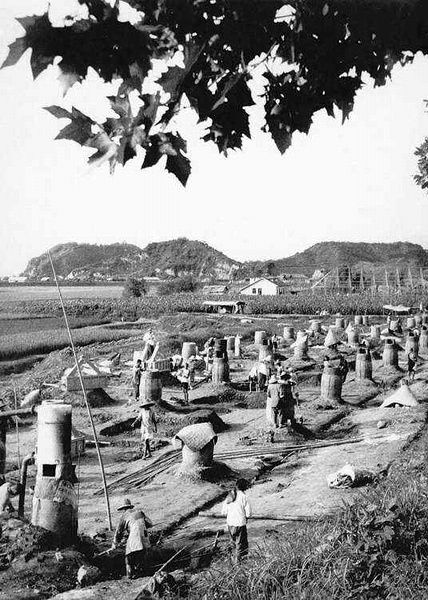
Backyard furnaces in the countryside, 1958

The centerpiece of the Great Leap Forward was the nationwide drive to boost industrial production, specifically steel. At the Beidaihe Meeting in August 1958, the leadership officially set the steel production target for that year at 10.7 million tons, which was double the output of 1957. To meet this unrealistic goal, tens of millions of people—including peasants, workers, and students—were mobilized to build and operate "backyard furnaces" (small, primitive smelting sites). By October 1958, approximately 60 million people were involved in steel-making. This led to a massive waste of labor and resources, as much of the steel produced in these crude furnaces was of such low quality that it was industrially useless. Huge numbers of agricultural workers were pulled away from farming to work on steel production or large-scale water conservancy projects, leaving crops to rot in the fields. Under pressure to show revolutionary success, local officials reported wildly exaggerated crop yields, a phenomenon known as "launching satellites" (放卫星). Despite these glowing reports, actual grain production plummeted. The government, believing there was a surplus based on the false reports, continued high grain procurement, leading to severe famine in the countryside. By 1960, national grain production had fallen to 2,870 billion jin, a 15.6% decrease from the already low levels of 1959.

==== People's Commune Movement ====
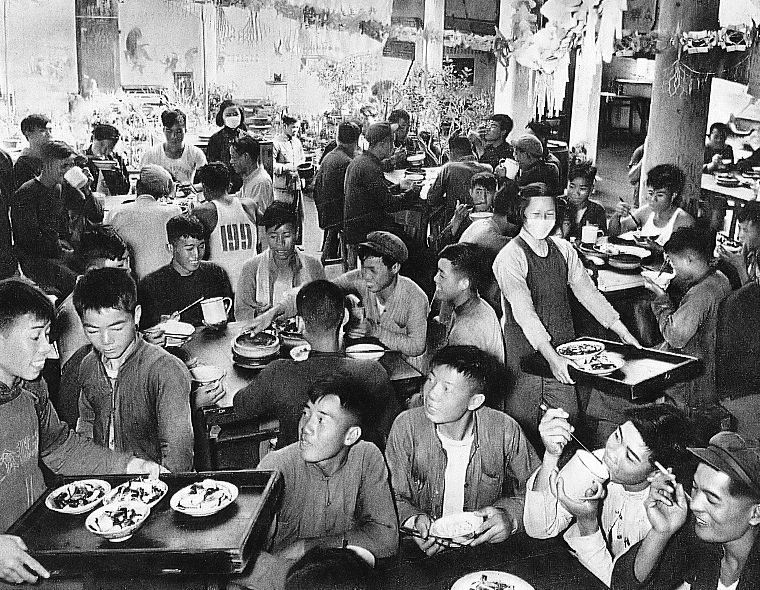
A collective meal as pictured in The 10th Anniversary Photo Collection of the PRC 1949–1959

In August 1958, during an inspection tour of Henan and Shandong, Mao Zedong declared, "It is good to set up people's communes" (renmin gongshe hao), which triggered a rapid nationwide surge in their establishment. The movement was formally adopted during the Beidaihe Meeting in August 1958 with the "Resolution on the Establishment of People's Communes in the Countryside". By the end of 1958, approximately 740,000 cooperatives had been merged into 26,000 communes, involving 99% of all rural households.

The People’s Communes were defined by the slogan "One: Large, Two: Public" (Yi da, er gong). Communes typically merged dozens of cooperatives, averaging about 5,000 households and sometimes reaching tens of thousands, far exceeding traditional administrative boundaries. Private plots, livestock, and even household tools and trees around homes were confiscated and turned into communal property.

The movement implemented a philosophy of "military-style organization, combat-style action, and collective living". Workers were organized into divisions, regiments, and platoons, moving to the fields in military formation to the sound of bugles and whistles. Many communes replaced wages with a "supply system" (gōngjī zhì, 供给制), providing free food, clothing, housing, and even services like haircuts and theater tickets. A central feature was the establishment of public mess halls where commune members "ate from one big pot" (chī dà guō fàn, 吃大锅饭) free of charge.

The radical haste of the movement led to the "Communist Wind" (Gongchan feng), a wave of forced egalitarianism and the arbitrary requisitioning of grain, tools, and property from peasants and lower-level communes. The "free meal" policy and egalitarian distribution destroyed the peasants' motivation to work, leading to a sharp decline in productivity. Labor was diverted from harvests to build "backyard furnaces" for steel, causing crops to rot in the fields even as communes continued to report record-breaking yields. By late 1958, signs of famine, including widespread edema, had already begun to appear.

=== Patriotic Hygiene Movement ===
The Patriotic Hygiene Movement (愛國衛生運動) was a critical component of the Great Leap Forward in the sectors of education, science, culture, and health, characterized by massive social mobilization and extreme targets aimed at eradicating diseases and pests. The core of the movement was the "Eliminate the Four Pests" (除「四害」) campaign. The original "four pests" were identified as rats, sparrows, flies, and mosquitoes. Provinces set "leap" schedules to become "pest-free": Beijing aimed for 2 years, Henan 3 years, and most other provinces like Shandong and Guangdong aimed for 5 years.

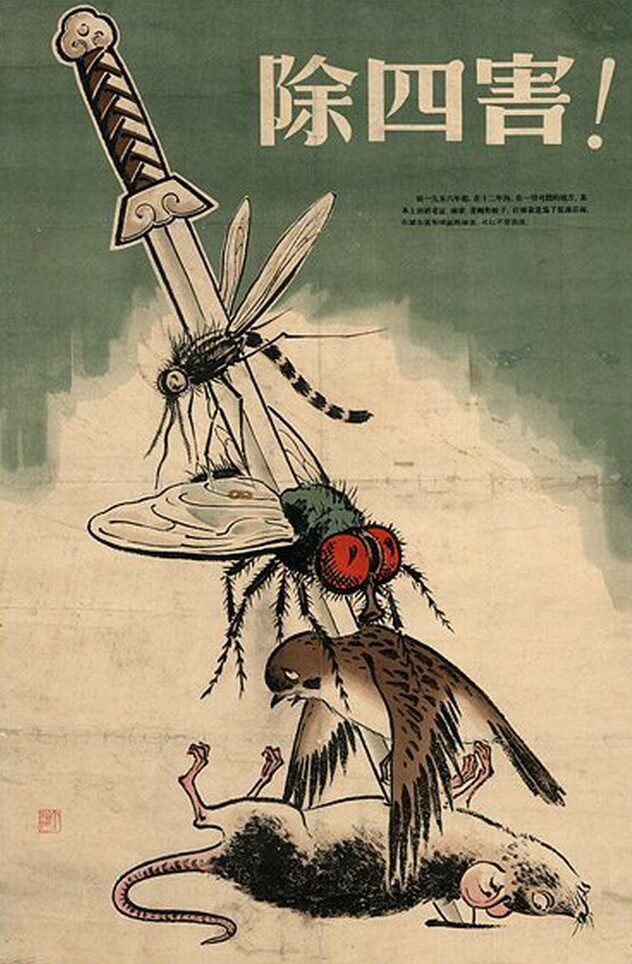
Chinese poster reading "Exterminate The Four Pests" (Chinese: 除四害; pinyin: Chú Sì Hài), 1958.

The campaign against sparrows was particularly intense. On April 19, 1958, in Beijing, 3 million people were mobilized to use gongs, drums, and firecrackers to prevent sparrows from landing, forcing them to fly until they died of exhaustion. Shanghai reported killing over 250,000 sparrows in a single day. In 1958, the government reported nearly 1.9 billion rats, and nearly 2 billion sparrows were killed. In 1959, the campaign reportedly killed over 1 billion sparrows, 1.5 billion rats, 100 million kilograms (20 0 million pounds) of flies, and 11 million kilograms (25 million pounds) of mosquitoes, though the reliability of these figures are questionable.After scientists argued that sparrows were beneficial for controlling crop-eating insects, Mao Zedong issued a directive on March 16, 1960, to stop killing sparrows and replace them with bedbugs on the official list.

While the campaign was meant to increase yields, concurrent droughts and floods as well as the lacking sparrow population decreased rice yields. The extermination of sparrows upset the ecological balance, which subsequently resulted in surging locust and other insect populations that destroyed crops due to a lack of a natural predator. With no sparrows to eat them, locust populations ballooned, swarming the country and compounding the ecological problems already caused by the Great Leap Forward, including widespread deforestation and misuse of poisons and pesticides. Although sparrows were removed from the Four Pests in 1960, the disruption of ecological balance, combined with errors in food distribution policies and the exaggeration of crop production figures, led to the Great Chinese Famine.

=== Lushan Conference ===
As the "Communist Wind" swept the country, signs of disaster appeared by early 1959. In the summer of 1959, Defense Minister Peng Dehuai wrote a letter to Mao expressing concern about the "wind of exaggeration" and the damage to the peasantry. Mao viewed this as a challenge to his authority and labeled Peng an "anti-party" right-opportunist. Instead of correcting course, the CCP launched a nationwide Anti-Right Deviation Campaign, which silenced critics and intensified the radical policies, driving the economy into a deeper abyss. In total, over 3 million CCP members were purged or penalized during the campaign.

=== Great Famine ===
The Great Famine (1959–1961), often referred to as the "Three Years of Great Difficulty", is a catastrophic humanitarian disaster that directly resulted from the political and economic errors of the Great Leap Forward and the People's Commune Movement. It is widely regarded as the deadliest famine and one of the greatest man-made disasters in human history, with an estimated death toll due to starvation that ranges in the tens of millions (15 to 55 million), (Note: According to various sources.) with newer estimates concentrated around 30 to 46 million excess famine deaths. (Note: Basil Ashton and Judith Banister provide a baseline of 30 million famine deaths. Cao Shuji's rigorous archival research estimates 32.5 million deaths, while Yang Jisheng's work estimates 36 million. Chen Yizhi's survey under Zhao Ziyang's directive estimated between 43 and 46 million deaths. Frank Dikotter estimates 45 million deaths.) Between November 1959 and October 1960, more than 1.07 million people died in Xinyang alone, accounting for 13.2% of the total population of the region. Peasants were forced to eat "substitute foods" such as tree bark, grass roots, and "Goddess of Mercy" earth (a type of indigestible clay). Cannibalism was documented in provinces such as Gansu, Ningxia, Guizhou, and Sichuan.

Faced with total economic collapse, the Chinese leadership was forced to retreat and implement corrective measures. In late 1960, the CCP adopted the guiding principle: "Adjustment, Consolidation, Enrichment, and Improvement" (Eight-Character Policy). Significant adjustments were made through documents like the "Sixty Articles on Agriculture" (1961), which abolished communal kitchens, restored private plots to farmers, and established the production team as the basic accounting unit. In a major policy shift, China broke the taboo of importing food from capitalist nations, bringing in millions of tons of grain from Australia and Canada to stabilize the cities. Through these efforts, the national economy began to recover starting in 1962, and by the end of 1965, agricultural and industrial production had returned to or exceeded pre-crisis levels.

=== Tibetan uprising ===
17 March 1959: Thousands of Tibetan women surround the Potala Palace, the main residence of the Dalai Lama, to protest against Chinese rule and repression in Lhasa, Tibet. Hours later, fighting broke out and the Dalai Lama was forced to flee to safety in India. Photograph: AP

The 1959 Tibetan uprising (also known as the Lhasa uprising) was a pivotal conflict that began on March 10, 1959, in Lhasa, the capital of Tibet. The uprising was primarily fueled by fears among the Tibetan population that the Chinese government planned to arrest or abduct the 14th Dalai Lama. On March 10, thousands of Tibetans surrounded the Norbulingka (the Dalai Lama's summer palace) to protect him. What began as a demonstration to protect the Dalai Lama quickly evolved into a broader movement demanding Tibetan independence and the reversal of the 1951 Chinese annexation. Following the landing of two artillery shells near his palace on March 17, the Dalai Lama concluded that the situation was too unstable and secretly fled Lhasa. He eventually reached India, where he was granted asylum and established a government-in-exile. Between March 20 and March 23, the Chinese People's Liberation Army (PLA) launched a heavy crackdown. The uprising was effectively suppressed after the PLA captured the Jokhang temple, the final center of resistance, on March 23. The Tibetan Government in Exile estimates that 87,000 Tibetans were killed during the 1959 uprising, though this is not widely accepted by Western nor Chinese scholars.

=== Education ===
During the Great Leap Forward, the number of universities in China increased to 1,289 by 1960 and nationwide enrollment more than doubled to 962,000 in 1960. Educational reforms during the Great Leap Forward sought to increase student and staff participation in the administration process, to favor students from worker, peasant, or soldier backgrounds in admissions, and to increase the role of the Communist Party and of politics in schools. The policy of combining education with labor was often implemented to an extreme degree. Students were required to spend excessive amounts of time participating in manual labor, such as steel making or agricultural work, which significantly disrupted the normal teaching order. Beginning in 1961, universities rolled back these policy initiatives, and increase meritocratic university policies instead of egalitarian ones.

Towards the end of this period, the educational environment began to shift again under the influence of the Socialist Education Movement. This movement, also known as the "Four Cleansings" (四清), began to create new political divisions within schools, viewing academic focus as a potential deviation toward capitalism. These tensions served as a localized precursor to the much larger disruptions of the Cultural Revolution that would begin in 1966.

=== Culture ===
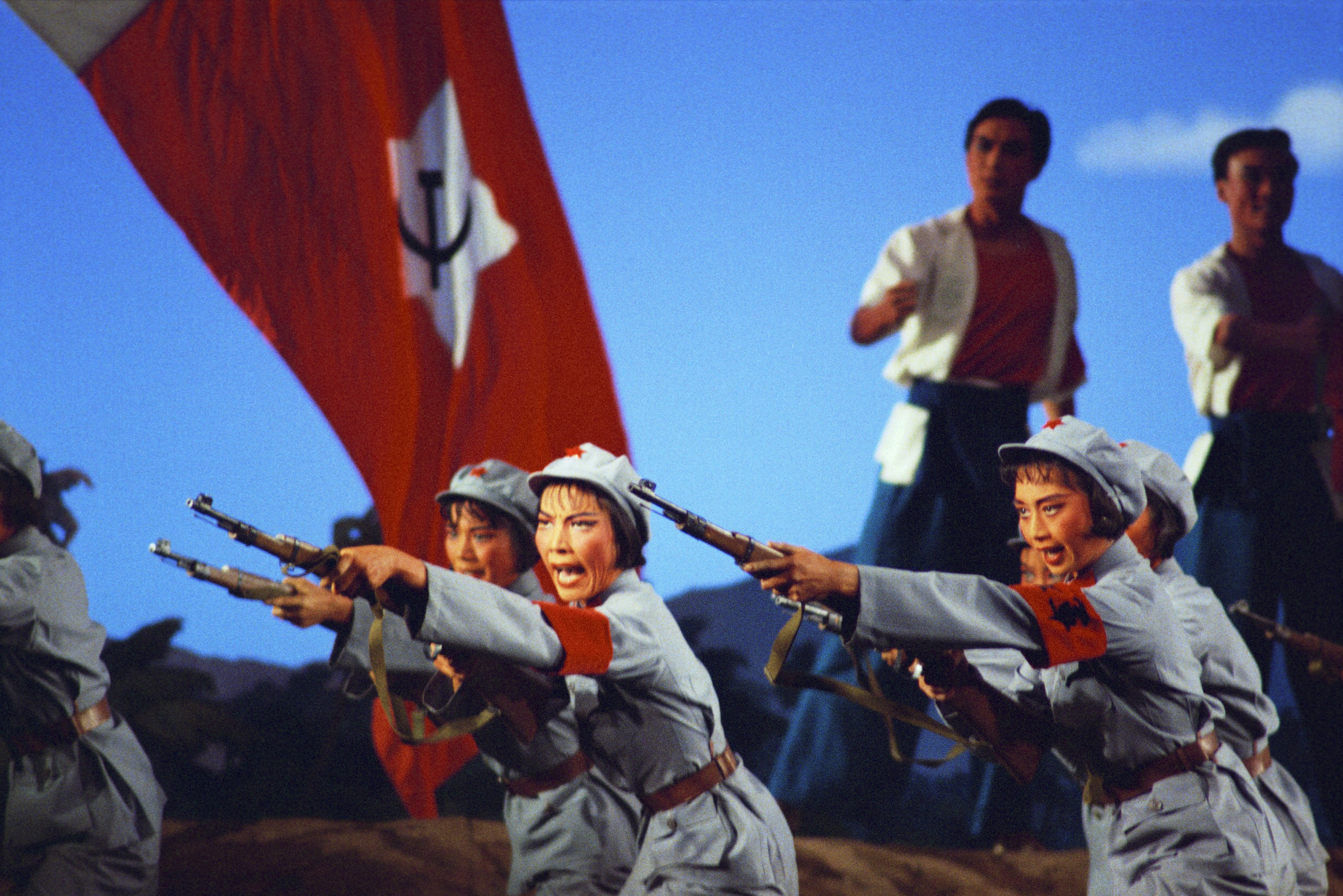
The Red Detachment of Women

Despite the political pressures of the time, the cultural sphere saw a surge in the creation of works. During this decade, Chinese writers produced a series of highly influential novels that focused on revolutionary history and the transformation of rural society. These works were widely read and had a profound impact on the public's consciousness. Notable titles included Red Crag, Tracks in the Snowy Forest, The Song of Youth, Defend Yan'an, and The Red Sun.

On 9 March 1958, the Ministry of Culture held a meeting to introduce a Great Leap Forward in cinema. During the Great Leap Forward, the film industry rapidly expanded, with documentary films being the genre that experienced the greatest growth.. To celebrate the 15th anniversary of the People's Republic of China, the grand musical and dance epic The East is Red (Dongfang Hong) was staged in Beijing. This massive production involved over 3,000 performers and utilized music, dance, and poetry to narrate the history of the Chinese revolution.

Efforts were also made to reform traditional Peking Opera to reflect modern life and revolutionary history. This movement resulted in a set of popular "model" works, including The Legend of the Red Lantern, The Red Detachment of Women, and Spark Amid the Reeds (later known as Shajiabang).

By 1965, book publishing had reached 2.17 billion copies, and broadcasting networks were expanded to cover more of the rural population. The number of cultural units, such as museums and libraries, grew from 14,408 in 1956 to 27,210 by 1965. China's first experimental television broadcasts began in Beijing in May 1958, laying the groundwork for a national network that would include 78 stations by the mid-1960s.

=== Science and technology ===
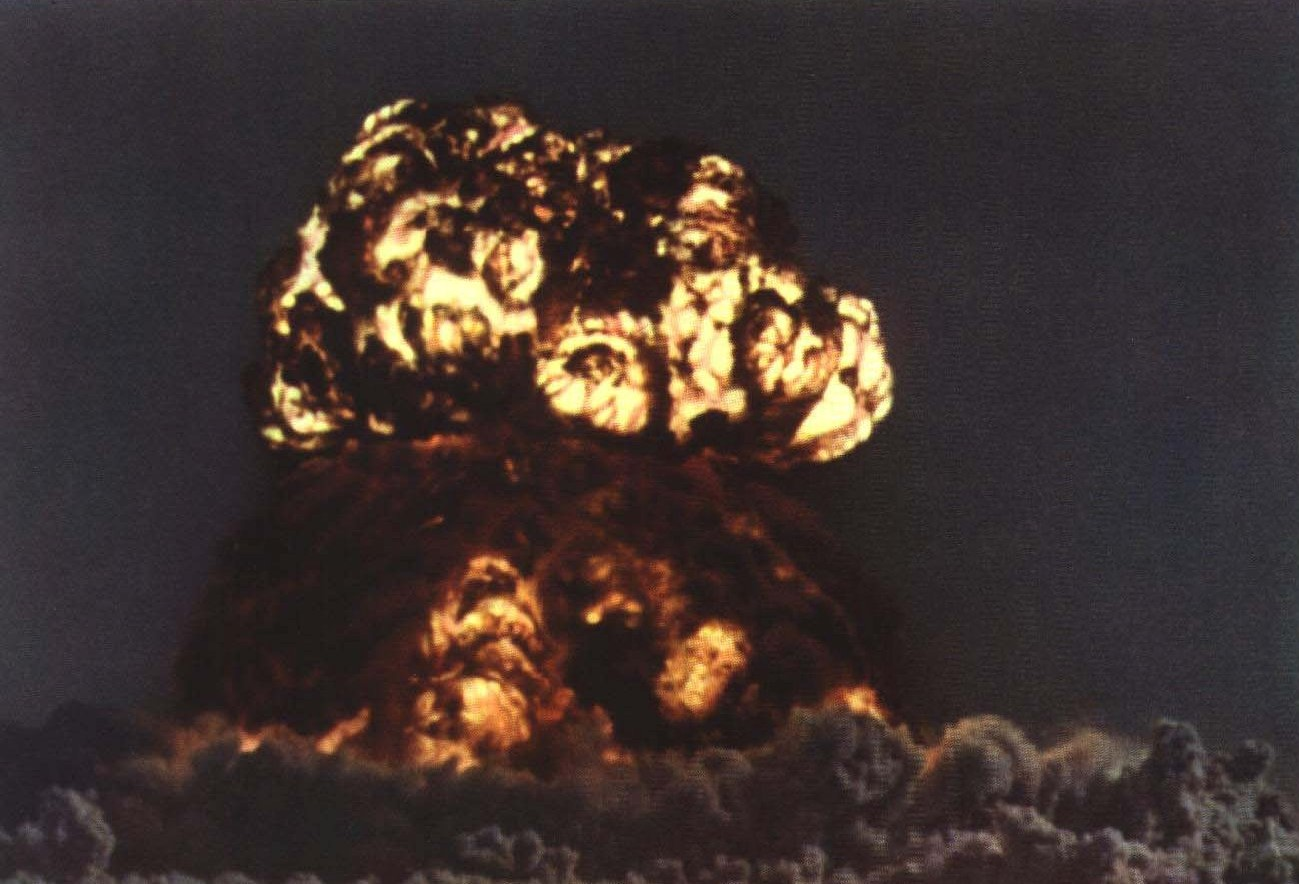
The mushroom cloud from the first atomic bomb test

Between 1959 and 1963, the discovery and development of the Daqing Oil Field transformed China from an oil-poor country into one that was basically self-sufficient in petroleum.

The most significant achievements of this era occurred in national defense, specifically within the program known as "Two Bombs, One Satellite". Driven by a 1955 strategic decision, China concentrated its resources on nuclear energy, with leading scientists like Qian Sanqiang played a pivotal role in establishing the Institute of Atomic Energy. In 1956, following a proposal by Qian Xuesen, the Fifth Academy of the Ministry of Defense was established to focus on missile research. On October 16, 1964, China successfully detonated its first atomic bomb.

=== Diplomatic policy ===
The most significant shift in this period was the deterioration of relations with the Soviet Union. In July 1960, the Soviet government decided to recall all 1,390 specialists working in China, canceled hundreds of contracts, and stopped the supply of key equipment. By the early 1960s, the conflict moved into a phase of public ideological warfare. Between September 1963 and July 1964, the CPC published a series of nine open letters, known as the "Nine Commentaries" (九评), which systematically criticized the Soviet leadership as "revisionist" and "social-imperialist". The Soviet Union retaliated by pressuring other socialist countries and communist parties to isolate China. By March 1966, when the CPC refused to attend the 23rd Congress of the CPSU, diplomatic and party-to-party relations were essentially broken.

On August 23, 1958, the People's Liberation Army (PLA) launched a massive artillery bombardment against the island of Quemoy (Jinmen). The U.S. responded with the largest naval concentration since World War II, tasking the Seventh Fleet to escort Nationalist transport ships. Beyond the Taiwan Strait, China also strongly condemned the US military intervention in Vietnam. From 1964 onwards, China provided substantial non-refundable military aid, equipment, and personnel to help North Vietnam build infrastructure and resist US attacks.

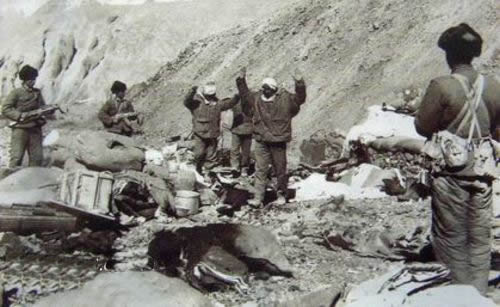
Indian soldiers surrender to Chinese forces in the 1962 border conflict.

Between 1960 and 1963, China successfully signed border agreements with Burma, Nepal, Mongolia, Pakistan, and Afghanistan. Tensions with India escalated into a brief armed conflict in October 1962 due to unresolved territorial disputes. Between 1963-1964, Premier Zhou Enlai made a visit to 13 countries in Asia and Africa to strengthen solidarity and support national liberation movements.

In a move described as a "diplomatic nuclear explosion," China and France established ambassadorial relations on January 27, 1964. France became the first major Western power to break through the blockade and recognize the People's Republic of China. Relations with Japan, meanwhile, progressed through so-called "people-to-people" diplomacy. In 1962, the signing of the L-T Trade Memorandum established semi-official trade ties and laid the groundwork for the eventual normalization of Sino-Japanese relations in 1972.

== Third Front ==
After the failure of the Great Leap Forward, China's leadership slowed the pace of industrialization. It invested more on in China's coastal regions and focused on the production of consumer goods. After an April 1964 General Staff report concluded that the concentration of China's industry in its major coastal cities made it vulnerable to attack by foreign powers, Mao argued for the development of basic industry and national defense industry in protected locations in China's interior. This resulted in the building of the Third Front, which involved massive projects including railroad infrastructure, aerospace industry including satellite launch facilities, and steel production industry including Panzhihua Iron and Steel.

Development of the Third Front slowed in 1966 during the Cultural Revolution, but accelerated again after the Sino-Soviet border conflict at Zhenbao Island, which increased the perceived risk of Soviet Invasion. Third Front construction again decreased after United States President Richard Nixon's 1972 visit to China and the resulting rapprochement between the United States and China. When Reform and Opening up began after Mao's death, China began to gradually wind down Third Front projects. The Third Front distributed physical and human capital around the country, ultimately decreased regional disparities and created favorable conditions for later market development.

== Cultural Revolution ==
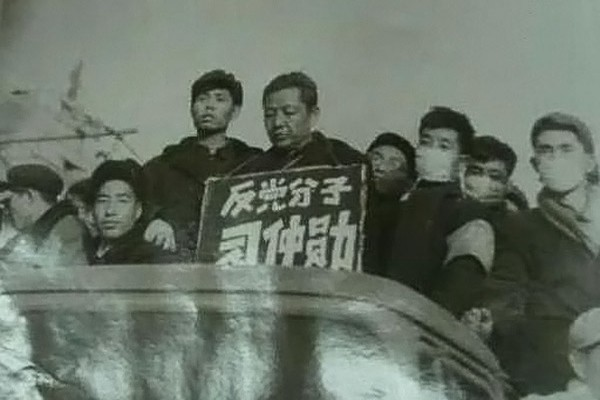
A struggle session in September 1967 targeting Xi Zhongxun, the father of Xi Jinping, who had been labeled an "anti-party element.

The Cultural Revolution, formally known as the Great Proletarian Cultural Revolution, was a sociopolitical movement in the People's Republic of China (PRC). It was launched by Mao Zedong, chairman of the Chinese Communist Party, in 1966 and lasted until his death in 1976. Its stated goal was to advance Chinese communism by purging remnants of capitalist and traditional elements from Chinese society and government.

In May 1966, with the help of the Cultural Revolution Group, Mao launched the revolution and said that bourgeois elements had infiltrated the government and society with the aim of restoring capitalism. Mao called on young people to 'Bombard the Headquarters', and proclaimed that "to rebel is justified". Mass upheaval began in Beijing with Red August in 1966. Many young people responded by forming cadres of Red Guards throughout China. Quotations from Chairman Mao Tse-tung became revered within a cult of personality. In 1967, emboldened radicals rebelled and seized power from local governments and party branches, establishing revolutionary committees in their place while smashing public security, procuratorate and judicial systems. These committees often split into factions, precipitating armed clashes among the radicals. After the fall of Lin Biao in 1971, the Gang of Four became influential in 1972, and the revolution continued until Mao's death in 1976, followed by the arrest of the Gang of Four.

The Cultural Revolution was characterized by violence and chaos across Chinese society. Estimates of the death toll vary, ranging from 1 to 2 million, including the Guangxi Massacre that included cannibalism, as well as massacres in Beijing, Inner Mongolia, Guangdong, Yunnan, and Hunan. Red Guards sought to destroy the Four Olds (old ideas, old culture, old customs, and old habits), which often took the form of destroying historical artifacts and cultural and religious sites. Tens of millions were persecuted, including officials such as Liu Shaoqi, Deng Xiaoping and Peng Dehuai; millions were persecuted for being members of the Five Black Categories, with intellectuals and scientists labelled as the Stinking Old Ninth. Schools and universities were closed, and the National College Entrance Examinations were cancelled. Over 10 million youth from urban areas were relocated under the Down to the Countryside Movement.

In 1978, Deng Xiaoping became the paramount leader, replacing Mao's successor Hua Guofeng. Deng and his allies introduced the Boluan Fanzheng program and initiated the reform and opening up, which, together with the New Enlightenment movement, dismantled the ideology of the Cultural Revolution. In 1981, the CCP publicly acknowledged failures of the Cultural Revolution, declaring it "responsible for the most severe setback and the heaviest losses suffered by the people, the country, and the party since the founding of the People's Republic." Memories and perspectives of the Cultural Revolution are varied and complex in contemporary China. It is often referred to as the "ten years of chaos" (十年动乱; shí nián dòngluàn) or "ten years of havoc" (十年浩劫; shí nián hàojié).

== Urban–rural divide ==
The urban–rural divide was the most important division in Maoist China when it came to the distribution of food, clothing, housing and health care. Rural status carried no entitlement to a state ration card, wages or social security. As a result, Maoist China is sometimes described as a dual society. The model of development in Mao's China was to develop heavy industry through the exploitation of the rural population. In order to minimize the cost of staple foods for the urban population, farmers were compelled to sell any agricultural surplus above a specified level to the state at artificially low prices. In some regions the state also ate into the rural grain supply, causing shortages for the locals. The rural population endured the worst of the Great Leap Famine in part because the state could seize as much grain as it needed, even under starvation conditions. The appropriated grain was largely used to feed the urban population, although some of it was exported.

The difference in treatment of urban and rural areas was a major push factor for internal migration, which lead to increased restrictions on mobility. The ways to acquire an urban hukou were limited, including serving in the People's Liberation Army, passing the national university entrance examination or being recruited by an urban work unit as a permanent worker. Because of these restrictions, the rural proportion of the population was higher in 1978 than it had been in 1958.

== Mao Zedong's legacy ==
The history of the People's Republic from 1949 to 1976 is accorded the name "Mao era"-China. A proper evaluation of the period is, in essence, an evaluation of Mao's legacy. Since Mao's death there has been generated a great deal of controversy about him amongst both historians and political analysts.

Mao's poor management of the food supply and overemphasis on village industry is often blamed for the millions of deaths by famine during the "Mao era". However, there were also positive changes as a result from his management. Before 1949, for instance, the illiteracy rate in mainland China was 80%, and life expectancy was a meager 35 years. At his death, illiteracy had declined to less than 7%, and average life expectancy had increased by 30 years. In addition, China's population which had remained constant at 400,000,000 from the Opium War to the end of the Civil War, mushroomed more than 700,000,000 as of Mao's death. Under Mao's regime, some argue that China ended its "Century of Humiliation" and resumed its status as a major power on the international stage. Mao also industrialized China to a considerable extent and ensured China's sovereignty during his rule. In addition, Mao tried to abolish Confucianist and feudal norms.

Birth and death rate in China

China's population growth

Life expectancy by world region

China's economy in 1976 was three times its 1949 size (but the size of the Chinese economy in 1949 was one-tenth of the size of the economy in 1936), and whilst Mao-era China acquired some of the attributes of a superpower such as: nuclear weapons and a space programme; the nation was still quite poor and backwards compared to the Soviet Union, the United States, Japan, or Western Europe. Fairly significant economic growth in 1962–1966 was wiped out by the Cultural Revolution. Other critics of Mao fault him for not encouraging birth control and for creating an unnecessary demographic bump by encouraging the masses, "The more people, the more power", which later Chinese leaders forcibly responded to with the controversial one-child policy. The ideology surrounding Mao's interpretation of Marxism–Leninism, also known as Maoism, was codified into China's Constitution as a guiding ideology. Internationally, it has influenced many communists around the world, including third world revolutionary movements such as Cambodia's Khmer Rouge, Peru's Shining Path and the revolutionary movement in Nepal. In practice, Mao Zedong Thought is defunct inside China aside from anecdotes about the CCP's legitimacy and China's revolutionary origins. Of those that remain, some regard the Deng Xiaoping reforms to be a betrayal of Mao's legacy.

== See also ==
- 1976 Tangshan earthquake
- Wage reform in China, 1949–1976
- List of vice premiers of the People's Republic of China
