= Wage reform in China, 1949–1976 =

After the Chinese Communist Party (CCP) extended its ruling to most parts of China and set up a national government in Beijing in 1949, it encountered a lot of new tasks. The first was to rebuild the economy, which deteriorated sharply during the last years of Nationalist Party (KMT) governing. The strategy that led CCP to state power is termed as "using the rural areas to encircle the cities" (农村包围城市). Thus, one difficulty CCP had in economy was that it had little experience in dealing with the urban part of the economy. Furthermore, facing the threat of KMT's fighting back, it needed to consolidate its political power. To meet these challenges, a new and coherent wage system in the economic sector was needed. Naturally, this transformation of wage system had both political goals and economic goals. Economically, via setting up a new wage system, CCP wanted to stabilize the economic situation, to ensure normal people's everyday living and also to further develop the economy. Politically, CCP not only wanted to distinguish itself from the old KMT regime by this new wage system, but also to make the wage system suitable for the future socialist economy. After two wage reforms in 1952 and 1956, a new wage system was established, and its influence continued to today.

== Background ==
=== Old payment system ===
Before CCP came to power, wage systems of the CCP ruled area and of KMT ruled area were totally different. In CCP ruled area, the wage system was organized in form of so-called provisioning system or supply system (供给制), under which workers, soldiers, cadres and other employees were supplied with a certain amount of daily necessities and foods to meet their basic needs. Although there were ranks in the supply system, the inequality was very small compared to other wage systems during that period in China.

On the other hand, in the KMT ruled area, there was no national-wide unified wage system. In the previous government-owned enterprises, public services and some private-owned enterprises, the wage system was based on ranks and levels. In this old wage system, numerous levels existed. While the difference between two levels next to each other might be little, the difference between two ends in it was huge. For example, before 1949, the Shi Jin Shan Steel Factory had more than one hundred wage levels, and the difference between two adjacent levels only equaled 0.5 kilogram millet.

After CCP seized the power, the difference between various payment systems did not disappear immediately. Instead, they co-existed for a period. The CCP kept the provisioning system, although some modification like the overall rationing system (包干制) was introduced. In the overall rationing system, the goods supplied was converted to cash and paid to the cadre one time per month. Meanwhile, for most former employees in the public services and former state-owned factories, they were kept in their previous posts under the guidance of "the same rank, the same payment" (原职原薪). This co-existing of the two systems created administrative difficulties for the new regime. More importantly, the differences between the real incomes in these two systems also generated discontent and other problems within CCP's cadres. Under such conditions, CCP decided to transform the wage system and make it more suitable for future development.

=== Reforms to a unified wage system ===
In the central level, CCP took a series of reforms in order to gradually build a national-wide unified wage system. Some reforms were implemented locally in early "Liberated Areas"(解放区), such as Northeast China (东北), before nationwide reforms took places. The first of these national reforms took place from 1950 to 1952, in which an intermediate form of wage, wage point, was introduced. In 1956, the wage point and the provisioning system were officially replaced by a money wage hierarchy system based on rank. It happened almost at the same time when the socialist transformation finished, and was also a part of the first 5 Years Plan.

== Wage hierarchy system based on rank ==
From 1956 to 1976 (and also later), the Chinese wage system was based on a model called "wage hierarchy system based on rank" (等级工资制度). Although details such as the form of wage and the differences between levels varied through this periods, the main features of this system remained constant. and its influence remain till present.

=== Influence of the Soviet Union ===
The establishment of wage hierarchy based on ranks was influenced heavily by the Soviet Union. Beyond the common ideology of PRC and USSR that brought similarities in the wage system, there were more direct influences from the Soviet Union on this issue. Such influence even existed in the Yan'an period (footnote), when Stalin did not trust, or at least was unsure of CCP's ability to win the Chinese Civil War. As the outcome of the civil war became clearer, the Soviet Union's direct involvement began to play a more important role.

The Soviet Union's influence on the wage system came in two ways: it first came into China via management on the work floor level in the Northeast, where the Soviet Union occupied after the Japanese surrendered. Due to this, the Northeast was the first place that implemented the wage hierarchy system based on rank and also piecework wage. Before the CCP won the deciding Liaoshen Campaign, Soviet Union set up several joint enterprises in Northeast. In these enterprises, wage rank was implemented. Later, after the emancipation of the whole Northeast for the Nationalist Party in 1948, the reform was carried out under the direction of Soviet's consultants, and employees' were classified into 9 ranks and 39 levels.

After the founding of the PRC, the Soviet Union's influence came through high-level policy design. In the early 1950s, the PRC took the Soviet Union as its model in socialist development. As part of such learning, in 1956 wage reform, it almost copied every element of the Soviet Union's wage system. At least two Soviet experts directly participated in drafting the new wage rank system. After 1956 reform, both countries had a wage hierarchy of 7 or 8 grades. Like other Soviet's models in China, this wage system soon met its practical limits and also political challenges. Just one year later, the CCP began to modify this system in order to meet its own ideological ends and practical conditions.

=== Principles of the Wage Hierarchy System ===
The Soviet Union's influence was embodied in the general principles of the wage system and its technical details. The wage system in the socialist regime was not only a method of redistribution, but also was designed as an organic part of the state developmental machine. In other words, like any other wage system, it was both political and economical.

Politically, it aimed at creating a more equal society that fits the vision of socialist society. Following Marx's conception of the communist society, CCP held that the optimal principle of distribution is "distribution according to need" (按需分配). The need mentioned here was determined by the nature of the society. However, the socialist period is still a transitive period towards the communist society. It is transitive in two senses: in the sense of forces of production and also in the sense of social consciousness. The Marxism's orthodox discussion about productivity and social consciousness is expressed as "the economic base determines the superstructure". Due to the low level of economic development in China, there were different kinds of ownership existing during this period, making the market remain a necessary mediation between different parts of the economy. More importantly, according to this thought, the social consciousness is still undeveloped due to the backwards in the economy. Thus people were supposed to continue being guided by the commodity exchange. During this transitive period, the "distribution according to need" is impossible. Alternatively, the general principle in it was called "distribution according to labor" (按劳分配).

Economically, the principle of "distribution according to labor" aspired to encourage people to work harder in order to industrialize an undeveloped country. Concerning the economic issue, in this high level of institutional design, the 1956 wage hierarchy system aimed at achieving two seemly contradicting goals: on the one hand, it attempted to save the state's expenditures in paying employees' salaries; on the other hand, it sought to encourage workers to work harder in building the socialism. In order to achieve these goals, it had to expand the gap between grades and levels, distinguish different economic sectors and also use the piecework wage as a material initiative. These measures finally brought it in conflicts with the socialist ideology in general and Mao's conception of socialism in specific.

==== Thrift and Incentives ====
The wage hierarchy based on rank was designed to save wages and incentivize workers at the same time. For the saving part, it was a part of what the CCP called reasonable low wage system (低工资制). In discussing the significance and principles of 1956 wage reform, Li Fu Chun, drawing the distinction between consumption fund and accumulation fund, argued that the accumulation fund has the priority in developing the economy. The growth rate of wage, which is main consisting part of the consumption fund, should be smaller than the growth rate of productivities. Only via this mean, the accumulation fund can grow fast and make the economy growth faster. Zhou En Lai stated that the first goal of this low wage system was to ensure employees' basic needs for living. It must suit the low level of industrial and agricultural development of China at the time.

Along this line of think, one way that could encourage workers to work harder under the low wage system was to highlight the difference between workers according to their contributions in the economy. The old payment system under the KMT period was criticized not because that it treated workers unequally, but because that it had little difference between two adjacent levels, and also represented the wrong hierarchy of industrial sectors. The new wage rank system needed to reverse that, and the new principle of difference was summarized in the phrase of "distribution according to the labor" . The differences in the aspect of the contribution are further dissected to three levels: the worker performance, the worker's skill and the economic sectors. Correspondingly, the wage ranks and levels dealt with the worker's skill, the differences between sectors and areas dealt with the macro-level economic structure, and finally, the wage form dealt with the worker performance on the workshop floor.

==== Ranks and Levels ====
In the preparation of the 1956 wage reform, CCP identified three defects that the old wage system had in the "Report on the Wage Regulations (First Draft)". Ironically, one defect that the CCP identified in the old wage system of the KMT period is the "egalitarianism" (平均主义). This feature was manifested in that the old wage system had too many levels while the two adjacent levels were too similar. For example, in the North China Electricity Bureau, there were 148 levels. Most employees were in the middle of these levels.

The other symptom of the egalitarianism was that the differences between technical and non-technical workers, skilled and unskilled workers, heavy labour and light labour workers were insignificant. Even sometimes unskilled worker's wage was higher than skilled one's. Citing Stalin, the report believes that such egalitarianism in payment hindered the development of productivity by discouraging workers from learning techniques and becoming skilled workers.

The direction of the new wage system was to cut down the number of the levels and also expand the difference between two levels. In this way, it could encourage workers to improve their knowledge about the production and also the ratio of productivity. The final product of this reform is also called hierarchy wage system based on 8 ranks (八级工资制) because that in the industrial sector, most factories had 8 ranks after the reform. Usually, the difference between the lowest and the highest wage was between 2.5 and 3.2 times. The wage increased geometrically between two ranks.

Not all the wage hierarchy systems were based on 8 ranks, especially in the government sections and state-managed factories. 8 ranks usually existed in the local factories. Institutions with higher privilege politically or economically tended to have more ranks. For example, in the government section there were 30 grades, and within each grade, there were 11 levels. In total, there were 330 levels. The difference between the highest wage and the lowest wage is 36.4 times. Similar phenomena happened in some production enterprises. For example, in the Changchun First Automobile Works (长春第一汽车制造厂), there were 48 levels for all works. After the reform, there were 20 ranks and 126 levels. To some degree, the wage reform did not achieve its initial goal in certain kinds of institutions, especially the non-production ones.

Ideally speaking, the rank and level of a worker should be determined by his/her skills and experience. In the logic of the policy design, CCP believed that the tangible difference between levels and ranks would encourage employees to work for promotion. If the promotion was based on their skills, they would have greater motivation to "study politics, techniques and culture". Workers with more knowledge about the production, ideally, would in turn be more efficient in production. Some reports show that in enterprises where the wage rank system was implemented, this system did encourage ordinary workers to study techniques. After the wage rank system was carried out, workers were willing to buy technical books they were not interested in before and also to participate in job training.

The method to decide rank and level met some ambiguities in practices. The first was how to decide the ranks and levels of administrative staffs, who do not work in the production process. For them, the criteria of skills were not suitable. Instead, their "job, virtue and talents" (职务和德、才等条件) were the determining factors. Second, even for the workers, the criteria for promotion were not purely based on their skills and work performance. On the one hand, the CCP did not have enough cadres who were capable of dealing with specific technical details in production; on the other hand, the ideal for workers, and also other employees was "red and expert" (又红又专), which means that one must have both political loyalty and expertise in production. Political factors were always in consideration of deciding the wage.

In practices, the practice of deciding ranks either was simplified to how long the worker had been employed, or was subjected to the workshop politics. For example, before the Cultural Revolution, new technical workers would automatically advance from the lowest rank to the next rank after working for one year. When political factors were put into this evaluation, the power of grading was in the level of factories, and often the virtues of a worker/employee were deemed as highly related to their political stands. In workshop floor, this political criterion was embedded in kind of personal relationship between leaders and their followers, and the latter affected the levels of wage and other benefits one got to a great extent. Sociologist Andrew Walder termed this kind of relationship as the communist neo-traditionalism. In this situation, the workshop politics played a crucial role in determining the rank, sometimes it was even more important than the technical principles.

==== Differences between Industries and Areas ====
The CCP also identified other shortcomings in the old wage system. One was that the hierarchy in wage across the sectors did not reflect the importance of those sectors in the whole economy. In the KMT period, the wage in the light industry was higher than the heavy industry. This was seen by the CCP as reversing the importance of different sectors or misunderstanding it. Taking the 1950 data before the wage reform, which reflects the old wage system, as an example: if the steel industry's average wage is set as 100, the telecom's was 163, the post's was 152, the electricity's was 140, textile's was 135, the chemic industry's was 134, the machine manufacture's was 123, the railway's was 109 and the coal mining's was 99.6. According to the view of CCP, the right sequence of sectors should be coal mining, steel, petroleum, electricity, machine manufacturing, machine fixing, textile, paper industry, flour industry, tailoring and so on.

The other problem was the flowing of workers. Under the old wage system, factories in the same sector of one area had different wages. This caused a high rate of turnover of workers across the factories. Before the socialist transformation, the workers tend to move from public enterprise to private one, from rural place to big city. CCP believed that this was an obstacle for production since it made the production process highly unstable and thus it should be eliminated. The flowing of workers for CCP was also a social problem. Before the wage reform, one factory even called the police to stop their doctor who was unsatisfied of his low wage from quitting the job and leaving the town. Wage reform was supposed to help stop such flowing of the population.

In the new wage system designed in 1956, the difference between different sectors is highlighted. Although the new wage rank system did not follow the exact sequence mentioned above, it tried to pay higher wage to workers in the heavy industry. (See form 1) This fitted CCP's developmental strategy: heavy industry was more important than the light industry.

Industrial Sectors	Index of average of maximum plus minimum basic wages in North East
Iron and steel	1.000
coal	1.000
electric power	.974
machine manufacturing	.946
petroleum	.950
heavy chemical	.911
lumber	.911
cement	.914
grass	.914
textile	.804
flour milling	.721
tobacco	.689

Unifying the wage in the same industry in the same area would help stop the moving of workers. It made the production more stable, gave the state more suitable situation to control the workforce. Also, since the workers had fewer choices, the state supposed that itself could pay less wage in total.

Also, in order to pay a minimum amount of wage but motivated people to the greatest extent, the new wage system differentiated payment in different geographical areas according to the living cost. The whole country in the 1956 wage reform was divided into 6 to 11 wage areas (工资区), and each area might further be divided into big cities and small cities. Generally speaking, the more developed area had a higher level of wage than the less-developed one, the big cities had a higher wage than the small cities. The wage was supposed to represent the differences in the living standard like the old wage point system. In doing this, it could pay the minimum amount to ensure employees' everyday life.

Finally, the new system provided the material incentive for workers who moved from more developed areas to less-developed. These workers were assigned to build industrial projects in inner provinces. The CCP tried to introduce more industry in the inner area to develop the country, and technical workers and skilled workers were needed in these projects. The only way to get them there was to assign these workers from their former working places, usually located in more developed areas and big cities, to the inner areas, which was less-developed. In order to encourage them to follow the order, their wage would be higher than the local standard, so they were supposed to have higher real wages.

==== Piecework Wage ====
In the 1956 wage reform, piecework wage was deemed as the most suitable form of wage. According to the resolution of this reform, the piece-work wage should be expanded to any factories where it was possible. Thus, unlike some assertion that China did not have piecework wage, it was once a focus of the CCP policy, and in 1956, the percentage of piecework wage reached around 46%.

As the whole wage system bore a lot of features from the Soviet Union, the piecework wage system was also introduced via learning the Soviet Union experience. The piecework wage did exist in China before. However, the idea that piecework wage should be implemented in the state-owned factories, combined with wage rank and should be expanded to the whole industry was a Soviet idea. Despite the advice on wage reform from the Soviet experts during the early 1950s, many factories in Northeast implemented piecework wage under the direct management of Soviet experts, even if some workers originally did not welcome this system. Mao might have little idea about the economic policy in the beginning, thus the Soviet experience played a much more important role in the early PRC.

After the 1956 wage reform, the piecework rate was not on absolute piece as it was during the KMT area, instead, the piece rate was linked to the wage rank. According to the 1951 "The Northeast State-Owned Factories' Piecework Wage System Provisional Regulation (Draft)" (东北公营企业计件工资制度暂行规程（草案）), the formula of piece work wage in China was:

$\text{Wage per Product} = \frac{\text{Standard Wage of Worker’s Rank}}{\text{25.5day}*\text{Working Hours per Day}*\text{Work Norm per Hour}} \$

The work norm in the formula was set higher than the average output and lower than the output of advanced workers, so that it could encourage workers to work harder to reach the level of advanced workers. Only products that passed the qualification would be counted. Otherwise, if worker caused loss, he could not receive any pay for the defected product and needed to compensate for it.

There were some differences between the Soviet model and the practices of piecework wage in China. First, the piecework wage in PRC was initially an unlimited piece system. This was due to the relative lack of skilled cadres in the early 1950s, and also reflects that CCP realized from the beginning that differences between the China and Soviet Union did not allow it to copy Soviet model without any modification. Another difference between the Soviet Union model and piecework system in China is the unit of the piece-work wage. In China, sometimes the unit was not individual as in the Soviet Union, but working group. Peter Schran also points out that another difference between Soviet Model and Chinese practices is that in China, piecework was more prevailing among the unskilled workers and in the handicraft, while in Soviet Union, piecework was more common among skilled workers and in the mechanized industries.

Piecework wage was a highly controversial issue in the early PRC. Despite the ideological debate mentioned in the later section, it also met practical difficulties. In the beginning of implementing this system, the shortage of raw materials and lack of skilled cadres who could be in charge of the production process led to many conflicts during the production and confusion about it. Still, CCP wanted to increase the range of piecework wage as quickly as possible before 1958. More information on this topic will be provided in the following sections.

=== Debates around the Wage Rank System ===
What was special for the Chinese wage system in Mao area was that tension between the political aspect and economical aspect was highlighted in the debates about it. From Mao's perspective, the wage system as a whole was not suitable for the socialist period. As early as 1958, in the Beidaihe Conference, Mao mentioned that he preferred the provisioning system. He argued that compared to the provisioning system, the wage system was a step backward. He said :"[We] should consider the question of eliminating the wage system [and] restoring the supply system...Restoring the supply system seems like 'retrogression,' [but] 'retrogression' means progress, because we've retrogressed since we came into the cities." In Mao's opinion, the wage system would finally be eliminated in the future, if not immediately. For Mao, the wage rank system was a retrogression in two aspects: it emphasized too much on the material incentives and ignored the political work; it created a new form of inequality among workers and cadres.

==== Material Incentives ====
The first problem of the wage rank system was that in its policy logic, the material incentives were given more significance than the political incentives. It assumed that the social consciousness of workers, due to the low level of politics, were not able to go beyond the money economy. Opposite to this view, Mao believed that the politics can boost the productivity. Thus, CCP should change its policy from "cash banner" to "political banner". Cancelling of piecework and stopping of regrading revealed this aspect of the debate.

===== Debate around Piecework =====
Piecework wage is a highly controversial issue in Socialist theory. From Marx's own point of view, the piecework rate is a tool for deception. When Marx talks about different forms of wage in Capital Volume One, he asserts that the piecework wage best suits the capitalist mode of production, because that it makes the workers believe it is not the labor power they sell to the capitalists, but the products. When the Soviet Union took this form of wage, it was questioned by the French syndicalists who visited Moscow. Stalin's reply focused on the role of piecework in promoting the productivity by mentioning the Stakhanovite. He said: "without progressives and without pieceworkers there would not be Stakhanovites and shock workers." This argument about material incentives was rejected by Mao, manifesting the divergence between the Soviet model and the Chinese Socialist Road.

In the beginning, CCP tried to extend the piecework wage following the Soviet Model. In 1956, spreading the piece-work wage was on the main agenda of the wage reform. In 1956, the percentage of piecework wage in state-owned enterprise reached its peak of 45.41%. Like other state-led movements, the quick expansion of piecework wage caused a lot of practical problems in workshop floor. In 1957, the CCP readjusted the pace of promoting piece-work wage, and the percentage of piece-work dropped to 39.29%. The determinant moment came one year later.

After Mao launched Great Leap Forward in 1957, some factories that recently implemented the piecework wage canceled the piecework and returned to the time-rate system. Other factories followed this trend for more obvious political reasons. In the 1958 Beidaihe Conference, Mao singled out piecework wage when he attacked the wage rank system and expressed clearly that "piece-rate wages are not a good system." This speech, and the later propaganda in People's Daily and other party's media set the tone on this issue. The most common critics on the piecework wage were that it did not pay attention to the political incentives. Only after two years when CCP claimed that piecework wage should be expanded to where it was possible, the Party decided to cancel the piecework wage national wide and issued a documentation called "Situations and Advises about Cancelling the Piecework Wage" (关于取消计件工资的情况和意见). The percentage of piecework rate further dropped to less than 5% in 1960. Although later CCP decided again to implement piecework wage in some factories, the percentage of piecework wage never went back to what it had been before the 1956. The highest percentage of piecework rate before the Cultural Revolution was 19.9%. During the early period of Cultural Revolution, piecework wage almost disappeared in China.

Despite the ideological debates on the high level politics, some scholars argue that the workshop practices were more influential in the failure of piecework wage system. In the early days of expanding piecework wage, many factories faced practical difficulties like lack of raw material supplies or cadres who were capable of mastering the technical issues in counting the work. Even if these technical issues had been solved, piecework wage still had its local political problem. Using oral history evidence, Walder argues that the piecework wage system was never popular on the workshop floor when it encountered workshop floor politics. In the practices, the new party members with technical training were often in charge of it, while the older party members, who had higher grade and more political capital were often reluctant to obey them. Also, because the party members were in charge of deciding the work norm and counting the pieces, the piecework wage system put the local party organization in antagonism with the normal workers. Other scholars also prove this point via using more official documentation.

===== The Suspension of Promotion =====
Since the Great Leap Forward, the grading or rising rank was also stopped in a lot of places. This practice was first implemented on the new workers. Walder noted that the group of people who were affected most by wage austerity were those who enter the labor force after 1958, i.e., after the Great Leap Forward. Another example also shows that the new workers who joined the worker forces only had a transitive wage, which was lower than the wage rank system. Although in 1961, "The State-Run Industrial Enterprises Working Regulations (Draft)" stipulates that such regrading should be carried out every year, and each year 40% of the employees could be raised to the higher rank, such practices were seldom carried out. This stopping of regrading was partly caused by the economic difficulties the Great Leap Forward brought about. In the first year of the Great Leap Forward, the state-owned factories recruited a large number of new employees, probably in order to finish the work norm. In the late 1959, Zhou En lai in the "Opinions About Labor Wage and Welfare" emphasized again that the state needed to cut down the number of the workers and also the necessities of low wage system. All these factors led to the stopping of income increasing. According to the data collected by Andrew Walder and others, because of the increasing of the good price, till 1982, the real wage after 1956 never reached its highest point in 1956.

==== Creating a New Form of Inequality ====
The other issue that Mao identified with the new wage rank system was that this new wage rank system created a new kind of inequality. He was especially unhappy about some party members, especially among the high-level party cadres. In one meeting with Shandong provincial officers in 1957, he criticized that a lot of such cadres now were fighting for personal fame and interests. They would even cry if they were classified to a low rank. Later in the 1958 Beidaihe Conference, Mao argued that the wage rank system is a part of the "bourgeois right" (资产阶级法权). He said: "[We] must eradicate the ideology of bourgeois right. For instance, competing for position, competing for rank, demanding overtime pay, high salaries for mental workers and low salaries for physical laborers-these are all vestiges of bourgeois ideology." This point is closely related to his critics on the Soviet Union, he thinks that "wage grades among Soviet cadres are too numerous and the gap [between the cadres and] the workers and peasants is too wide." This was seen as a feature of phony communism. In the Soviet Union rank system, the huge wage gap was absolutely true; the wage difference was larger than most Western countries' Civil Servant wage system. The most ironic thing was, compared to KMT period, the inequality in the 1956 wage rank system in the government (36.4:1) could be even larger than the old wage rank system (14.5:1).

===== Wage Cuts =====
Due to this rejection, although Mao did not reject to accept any wage at all, he refused to receive the highest rank of wage. Instead, Mao only accepted to take 404.8 Yuan per month. This got the attention of Zhou En Lai and others cadres. Only one year after the 1956 wage reform, the wage of high-level cadres was cut in 1957. In 1959, the top three levels in the government wage rank system merged to a single rank. In 1960, the wage of high-level cadres was further cut. Even after cutting the wage during this period, the difference between the highest and lowest is still 20.24:1. More importantly, cutting the wage could not solve the fundamental problem of "bourgeois right", since the difference between the ruling and the ruled still persisted during these practices.

== Wage of Contracted/Temporary Employees ==
The wage for the contracted/temporary employee is still an unstudied topic. Current materials only show that their wage should be less than the formal workers, while higher than the income of farmers. This difference between formal workers and other employees might have contributed to keeping a relative high level of work performance in the state-owned factories. More oral history and studies based on local archives are needed to complement this part.

== Later developments ==
Although after 1956 wage reform, there were many modifications on the wage system, only the details of this system have been changed. The general principle of the whole system remains unchanged, especially the rank system. 2 years before Mao Ze Dong died, he lamented when he met the Denmark Prime Minister Poul Hartling : "In a word, China belongs to Socialist Countries. Before the Liberation it is similar to Capitalism. Now it still implements hierarchy wage system based on 8 ranks, distribution according to labour, and exchange through money, all these are not different from the old society. The difference lies in the ownership." This had not been changed during Mao's time, and also after he died.

== See also ==
- Economic history of China (1949–present)
- Great Leap Forward
