= Exceeding the UK, catching the USA =

Chinese political slogan

- Chinese: 超英赶美
- Coined in: 1950s

Exceeding the UK, catching the USA (simplified Chinese: 超英赶美; traditional Chinese: 超英趕美; pinyin: chāoyīng gǎnměi) alternatively translated as surpassing Great Britain and catching up with the United States, was a slogan put forward by Mao Zedong during the Great Leap Forward. The slogan was representative of the two goals of surpassing Great Britain in steel production in 15 years and catching up with the United States in 50 years.

The slogan was mainly addressed to the secondary sector of the economy, of which steel and grain were top priority. At the end of China's first Five-Year Plan, steel output was still less than a quarter of the amount produced by Britain. Mao found overtaking Britain's steel to be of utmost importance to the "socialist transformation" of agriculture, as he found the two to be "inseparable" and unable to be dealt with "in isolation from each other". This was due to the increased need for agricultural machinery to be developed, as well as the agriculture tax that would fund the production of heavy industry. The justification for the selection of Great Britain and the United States as the focuses of the slogan was likely developed from the desire to prove socialist countries as more prosperous and fruitful than their imperialist counterparts, a sentiment that is likewise encapsulated in related Maoist slogan "The East wind prevails over the West wind".

In 1958, steel production rates had skyrocketed, as Soviet-aided steel plants went into widespread use after being constructed in the mid-1950s. The politburo meetings of August 1958 declared that production of steel would be set to double within the year. As a result of the newly set goal and strong ideological push for progress, people's communes began to dedicate most of their labour toward manufacturing efforts of the material. "Backyard steel furnaces" were created, where peasant workers would smelt household metal objects such as chairs and cooking utensils in fervent efforts to meet the high levels of demand. This led to significant impacts on peasant life within the communes, as reallocation of production priorities lead to a shortage of agricultural labour in the autumn of 1958.

After the Great Chinese Famine, Mao Zedong relaxed the time scale of "exceeding the UK, catching the USA" to more than 100 years in his speech at the Seven Thousand Cadres Conference.

In the end the goal was met on the original time frame. Chinese steel production exceeded that of the UK in the 1970s and that of the US in 1993, becoming the largest steel producing nation worldwide in 1996.

== See also ==
- Great Leap Forward
- Launching satellites
- Ryazan miracle
