= Nine Commentaries on the Communist Party of the Soviet Union =

- Simplified Chinese: 九评苏共中央的公开信
- Traditional Chinese: 九評蘇共中央的公開信
Transcriptions
Standard Mandarin
- Hanyu Pinyin: Jiǔpíng Sūgòng Zhōngyāng de Gōngkāixìn

Abbreviation
- Simplified Chinese: 九评苏共
- Traditional Chinese: 九評蘇共
Transcriptions
Standard Mandarin
- Hanyu Pinyin: Jiǔpíng Sūgòng

Further abbreviation
- Simplified Chinese: 九评
- Traditional Chinese: 九評
Transcriptions
Standard Mandarin
- Hanyu Pinyin: Jiǔpíng

The Nine Commentaries on the Communist Party of the Soviet Union were published by the Central Committee of the Chinese Communist Party (CCP) from 6 September 1963 to 14 July 1964 in the People's Daily and Red Flag magazines. These commentaries are based on the CPSU's open letter to the Soviet Party organizations and all Communist Party members dated 14 July 1963. The Nine Commentaries on the CPSU were part of the Sino-Soviet split and pushed the Sino-Soviet polemic to its climax. The Nine Commentaries were drafted by the Central Anti-Revisionist Document Drafting Group established in February 1963, with the group leader Kang Sheng presiding over the drafting, though another account has the deputy group leader Wu Lengxi having led the drafting. After being approved by Deng Xiaoping, the Secretary-General of the Secretariat of the CCP Central Committee, they were submitted to CCP Chairman Mao Zedong for review.

== Background ==
=== Sino-Soviet split ===
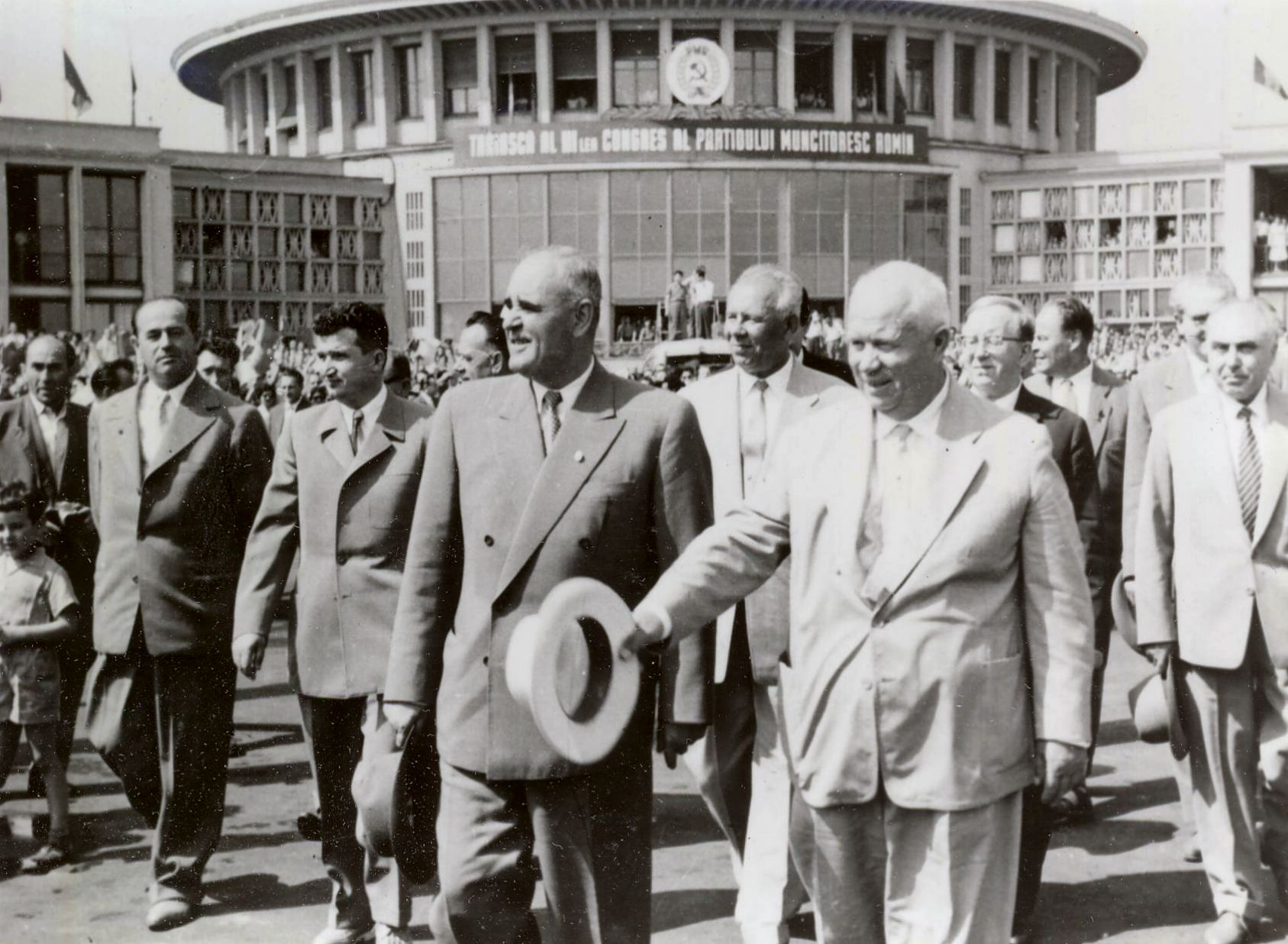
Romanian leader Gheorghe Gheorghiu-Dej (front left) and Soviet leader Nikta Khrushchev (front right) in Bucharest, Romania, June 1960

On 5 March 1953, Soviet leader Joseph Stalin died. On 25 February 1956, Nikita Khrushchev, the First Secretary of the Communist Party of the Soviet Union, delivered On the Cult of Personality and Its Consequences at the 20th Congress of the CPSU, which repudiated Stalin's cult of personality. At the Congress, Khrushchev put forward the "three-way line" (i.e., "peaceful coexistence, peaceful competition, and peaceful transition") between the socialist and capitalist camps. On 5 April 1956, the Chinese Communist Party published On the Historical Experience of the Dictatorship of the Proletariat (关于无产阶级专政的历史经验), which discussed Stalin, the cult of personality and other issues. On 11 November, Yugoslav leader Josip Broz Tito delivered a speech, opposing Stalinism and Stalinist elements. On 29 December, the CCP issued Further Discussion on the Historical Experience of the Dictatorship of the Proletariat (再论无产阶级专政的历史经验), discussing the 1956 Hungarian Revolution and giving an evaluation of the Soviet Union, the CPSU, and Stalin. Mao Zedong and other CCP leaders were dissatisfied with Khrushchev's de-Stalinization policies. From 1958 onwards, a series of events occurred between China and the Soviet Union that led to the deterioration of relations.

=== Split of the socialist camp ===
In April 1960, the CCP published three articles, Long Live Leninism (列宁主义万岁), Advance Along the Road of Great Lenin (沿着伟大列宁的道路前进), and Unite Under the Revolutionary Banner of Lenin (在列宁的革命旗帜下团结起来), criticizing revisionism in the international communist movement. In June 1960, the Soviet delegation submitted a letter to the CCP delegation during the 3rd Congress of the Romanian Workers’ Party in Bucharest, refuting the views in the three articles and organizing an "attack" on the CCP delegation led by Peng Zhen. Additionally, they criticized the Great Leap Forward as well as other policies of China. This led to the Sino-Soviet polemic becoming public, and caused the relationship between the two parties to break down openly. The Bucharest Conference of Representatives of Communist and Workers Parties in 1960 exposed for the first time the serious differences between the Chinese and Soviet parties within the socialist camp and the international communist movement.

From early November 1962 to late January 1963, the Bulgarian Communist Party, the Communist Party of Czechoslovakia, the Hungarian Socialist Workers' Party, the Italian Communist Party, and the Socialist Unity Party of Germany each criticized the CCP at their respective party congresses. From December 1962 to January 1963, the CCP Central Committee sent a delegation headed by Wu Xiuquan to participate in the party congresses of the four Eastern European communist parties. However, during the meetings, the CCP delegation and the delegations of the Soviet Union and Eastern European countries had disputes. During this period, on 31 December 1962, the People's Daily published an editorial entitled The Differences Between Comrade Togliatti and Us (陶里亚蒂同志同我们的分歧). criticizing Italian Communist Party leader Palmiro Togliatti and his structural reforms. Historian Shen Zhihua stated Mao's previous remarks on nuclear war had frightened some leaders of Eastern European countries, leading many Eastern European countries to no longer follow China. He said that they believed that the policies proposed by Mao were too risky and too militant.

Among the Eastern bloc countries, Albania was the only country that supported China. The Party of Labour of Albania, led by Enver Hoxha, supported the CCP's position, opposed the actions of the CPSU under Khrushchev's leadership, and accused the CPSU of revisionism, leading to the Albanian–Soviet split in 1961. In East Asia and South Asia, the Japanese Communist Party initially supported the CCP's position until the CCP–JCP relationship broke down around the time of the Cultural Revolution in 1966. North Korea and North Vietnam maintained a balance between China and the Soviet Union. North Korea only began to align itself with China after signing the Sino-Korean Border Agreement with China in October 1962 and demanding the return of some territory of Mount Paektu peak and Heaven Lake.

== History ==
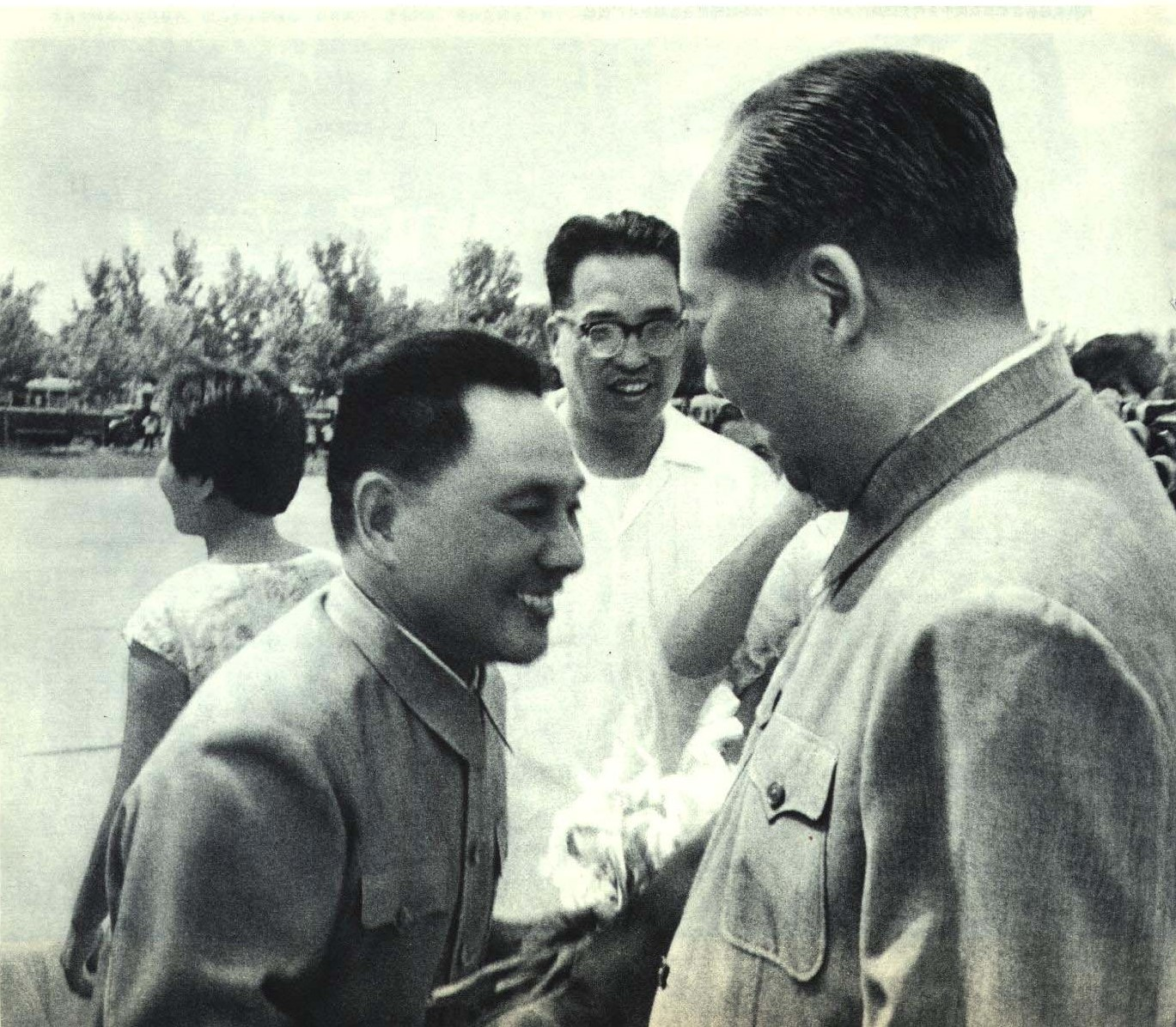
On 21 July 1963, Deng Xiaoping led a delegation of the Chinese Communist Party back to China from the Soviet Union. More than 5,000 people, including Mao Zedong himself, went to the airport to welcome him.

In February 1963, the CCP Central Committee established the Central Anti-Revisionist Document Drafting Group (中央反修文件起草小组), with Kang Sheng as the group leader and Wu Lengxi as the deputy group leader, though it was effectively led by Deng Xiaoping. On 30 March, the CCP Central Committee received a letter from the Central Committee of the Communist Party of the Soviet Union. On 3 April, Mao Zedong presided over a meeting of the Politburo Standing Committee and decided to launch a comprehensive criticism of the Central Committee of the CPSU. On 4 April, the People’s Daily published the letter from the CPSU Central Committee, revealing the differences between the two sides. On 14 June, the CCP Central Committee sent a letter to the CPSU Central Committee entitled Suggestions on the General Line of the International Communist Movement—A Reply from the Central Committee of the Chinese Communist Party to the Letter from the Central Committee of the Communist Party of the Soviet Union dated 30 March 1963 (关于国际共产主义运动总路线的建议──中国共产党中央委员会对苏联共产党中央委员会1963年3月30日来信的复信). The People’s Daily published the full text of the letter on 17 June. In May, North Korean leader Kim Il Sung had personally led a delegation to visit China and participated in the revision and discussion of the article.

From 6 to 20 July 1963, Deng Xiaoping led a delegation of the Chinese Communist Party to Moscow to participate in the talks between the two parties. During the talks, on 14 July, the CPSU Central Committee published an open letter to the party organizations at all levels and all Communist Party members in Pravda. This open letter mainly refuted and countered the article Suggestions on the General Line of the International Communist Movement (关于国际共产主义运动总路线的建议) published by the Chinese Communist Party on a series of issues related to the international communist movement. The two parties held a total of nine talks, but the two sides had significant differences and fierce debates. The negotiations eventually broke down and no results were achieved.

From September 1963 to July 1964, the CCP Central Committee, in the name of the People's Daily and the Red Flag editorial department, successively published nine articles commenting on the open letter of the CCP Central Committee criticizing "Khrushchev revisionism". The articles in the "Nine Comments" were all written by the Central Anti-Revisionist Document Drafting Group, with the Institute of International Relations participating in the drafting. After being approved by Deng Xiaoping, they were submitted to Mao for final review. The "Nine Comments" pushed the Sino-Soviet polemic to its peak and climax. At the same time, the CCP also published articles to retaliate. Some scholars believe that the "Nine Commentaries" and the Sino-Soviet debate were one of the important reasons for the launch of the Cultural Revolution and were the preparation of public opinion for the Cultural Revolution. Among them, the Ninth Commentary, On Khrushchev's False Communism and Its Lessons in World History — The Open Letter of the Central Committee of the CPSU, put forward fifteen points to "prevent the restoration of capitalism" and quoted a passage of Mao's instructions on 7 May 1963, which became the ideological root of the theory of the Cultural Revolution (Continuous Revolution Theory).

On 16 October 1964, Khrushchev stepped down and Leonid Brezhnev took office as the First Secretary of the Communist Party of the Soviet Union. In November 1964, the Chinese Communist Party sent Zhou Enlai to lead a delegation to participate in the celebrations of the October Revolution, in an attempt to test whether the Central Committee of the Communist Party of the Soviet Union would change its policy toward China. At that time, the Ten Commentaries were also finalized, but they were not published because of Khrushchev's downfall. Instead, Red Flag and People's Daily published How Khrushchev Stepped Down (赫鲁晓夫是怎样下台的), which brought an end to the Sino-Soviet polemic.

=== Nine Commentaries ===
The nine comments are as follows:

| English name | Chinese name | Date published |
|---|---|---|
| The Origin and Development of the Differences Between the Leadership of the CPSU and Us — A Commentary on the Open Letter from the Central Committee of the CPSU | 苏共领导同我们分歧的由来和发展——一评苏共中央的公开信 | 6 September 1963 |
| On the Stalin Question — Second Commentary on the Open Letter from the Central Committee of the CPSU | 关于斯大林问题——二评苏共中央的公开信 | 13 September 1963 |
| Was Yugoslavia a Socialist Country? — A Third Commentary on the Open Letter from the Central Committee of the CPSU | 南斯拉夫是社会主义国家吗？——三评苏共中央的公开信 | 26 September 1963 |
| Defenders of Neocolonialism — Fourth Commentary on the Open Letter from the Central Committee of the CPSU | 新殖民主义的辩护士——四评苏共中央的公开信 | 22 October 1963 |
| Two Lines on the Question of War and Peace — Fifth Commentary on the Open Letter of the Central Committee of the CPSU | 在战争与和平问题上的两条路线——五评苏共中央的公开信 | 19 November 1963 |
| Two Fundamentally Opposing Policies of Peaceful Coexistence — Sixth Commentary on the Open Letter of the Central Committee of the CPSU | 两种根本对立的和平共处政策——六评苏共中央的公开信 | 12 December 1963 |
| The CPSU Leadership is the Greatest Dividers of Our Time — Seventh Commentary on the Open Letter of the Central Committee of the CPSU, | 苏共领导是当代最大的分裂主义者——七评苏共中央的公开信 | 4 February 1964 |
| The Proletarian Revolution and Khrushchev's Revisionism — Eight Commentaries on the Open Letter of the Central Committee of the CPSU | 无产阶级革命和赫鲁晓夫修正主义——八评苏共中央的公开信 | 31 March 1964 |
| On Khrushchev's False Communism and Its Lessons in World History — Nine Commentaries on the Open Letter of the Central Committee of the CPSU | 关于赫鲁晓夫的假共产主义及其在世界历史上的教训——九评苏共中央的公开信 | 14 July 1964 |

== Legacy ==
The Resolution on Certain Questions in the History of Our Party since the Founding of the People's Republic of China adopted in June 1981 states: "The Soviet leaders provoked the Sino-Soviet polemic and turned the principled dispute between the two parties into a national dispute, exerting enormous political, economic and military pressure on China, forcing us to wage a just struggle against Soviet great-power chauvinism."

In May 1989, after the normalization of Sino-Soviet relations, Deng Xiaoping said: "For many years, there has been a problem of understanding Marxism and socialism. From the first Moscow talks in 1957 to the first half of the 1960s, the Chinese and Soviet parties engaged in fierce debates. I was one of the parties involved in that debate and played a significant role. After more than 20 years of practice, looking back, both sides have talked a lot of empty words.... In 1963, I led a delegation to Moscow, and the talks broke down. It should be said that from the mid-1960s, our relations deteriorated and were basically severed. This does not refer to the ideological debates, and we do not think that what we said at that time was correct. The real substantive issue is inequality, and the Chinese people feel humiliated."

In March 2006, Voice of America published an article stating that "later, the CCP and the CPSU publicly broke apart, and the internal debates between the two sides developed into open debates, which eventually led to the split and disintegration of the international communist movement. In retrospect, the open debate between the Chinese and Soviet parties was an extremely important event in the collapse of the entire Soviet-Eastern communist bloc. Some party history researchers even said that the CCP's Nine Commentaries was the turning point from prosperity to decline of the international communist movement."
