= Beidaihe Conference (1958) =

The Beidaihe Conference of 1958 (Chinese: 北戴河会议; Wade–Giles: Peitaiho Conference) was an enlarged meeting held by the Politburo of the Chinese Communist Party Central Committee from August 17 to 30 1958. It also involved a conference of provincial industrial secretaries and other relevant local leaders from the 25th to the 31st.

The conference was held in Beidaihe District, a seaside retreat for the CCP in Qinhuangdao City, Hebei province. In 1953, the CCP Central Committee formed the summer office system (Chinese: 暑期办公制度). Beidaihe is regarded as the summer capital of China, because almost all the important conferences of the CCP Central Committee in summer were convened here from 1953 to 1965.

The major topics of the Beidaihe Conference in 1958 were the national economic plan in 1959, current problems of industrial and agricultural production, and rural work. The conference adopted a whole series of critical documents, including the Communique of the conference, the Resolution of Establishing People's Communes in Rural Areas, the Directive on Launching Socialist and Communist Education Campaign, and so on.

In the conference, the CCP raised the 1958 steel production target to 10.7 million tons and the grain target to 350 million tons. By 1959, they planned to produce 30 million tons of steel and 500 million tons of grain. Meanwhile, the conference called for a mass movement to increase industrial production and supported building people's communes nationwide. It led the Great Leap Forward to reach its culmination in the next two months.

== Background ==
=== Continuously Rising Production Targets ===
The background of Beidaihe Conference in 1958 was firstly manifested in the continually increasing economic targets.

During the 8th National Party Congress in 1956, Zhou Enlai gave the speech about the second Five-year Plan. He suggested that by 1962, the annual steel production should reach 10.5 million tons to 12 million tons. Meanwhile, the annual grain output should reach 250 million tons. In 1957, steel production had been 5.35 million tons. In December, the 6th National Planning Meeting was convened to draw up the economic plan of 1958. According to the goal of catching up with the U.K. in fifteen years, China would produce 6.1 million tons of steel and 196 million tons of grain annually.

On Nanning Conference held in January 1958, the CCP confirmed to produce 6.2 million tons of steel and 196 million tons of grain in 1958. Besides, Bo Yibo, Chairman of State Economic Commission, proposed a new method of economic planning called "Two Plans" (Chinese: 两本账). It meant that there would be one plan which must be fulfilled and another plan which was expected to be fulfilled. Later this method was endorsed by Mao and included in "Sixty Points on Working Methods." Mao revised it as "three production plans": two are central plans - the one which must be fulfilled would be published, and the other which was expected to be fulfilled would not be published. Meanwhile, two are local plans - the first local plan was the second central plan which from the local view must be fulfilled. The second central plan was the basis of comparison. On Nanning Conference, Mao was irritated with "Anti-Rash-Advance" (Chinese: 反冒进), and labelled the "Anti-Rash Advance" as "vulgar dialectics and Marxism."

On March 8, the CCP called up Chengdu Conference. This conference changed the production target of Nanning Conference to the first production plan, and set up a higher target as the second production plan. The steel production of 1958 would be 7 million tons, and the grain would be 251.8 million tons. The document adopted in Chengdu Conference said "if we implement Chairman Mao's directives, our speed of socialist industrialization might be faster than the Soviet Union, and overtake the United Kingdom in less than fifteen years."

After Chengdu Conference, Mao went to Chongqing and Wuhan in April to inspect the countryside and factories. In Wuhan, he called all the leaders of provinces and municipalities who had not attended Chengdu Conference to report their work. Tian Jiaying, the secretary of Mao, said that Wuhan Conference was a supplement to Chengdu Conference. At that time, Mao had some pragmatic aspects. He asked local governments to be down-to-earth. They should not drive peasants intensively, but alternate work with rest. The policy of local industry was "serve the agricultural, serve the large-scale industry and serve the consumers (Chinese: 为农业服务，为大工业服务，为消费者服务)."

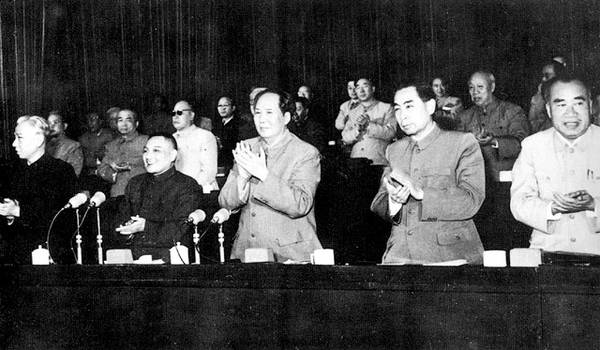
The rostrum of the Second Session of the 8th National Party Congress. From left: Liu Shaoqi, Deng Xiaoping, Mao Zedong, Zhou Enlai and Zhu De.

Things changed rapidly in summer. From May 5 to 23, the CCP held the Second Session of 8th National Party Congress, which formally adopted the General Line - which was suggested by Mao - "go all out, aim high, and build socialism with greater, faster, better, and more economical results (鼓足干劲，力争上游，多快好省地建设社会主义的总路线)." Zhou Enlai, Chen Yun, Bo Yibo and Li Xiannian criticized themselves because of their errors on Anti-Rash Advance. Half month after the conference, on June 7, Ministry of Metallurgical Industry reported to the Central Committee that the steel production target had been raised to 8.2 million tons in 1958 and 60 million in 1962. In mid-June, Li Fuchun, the leader of State Planning Commission, put forward the key points of the second Five-year Plan, which set the steel production target in 1958 to 8.5-9 million tons. The first plan of grain output in 1959 came to 300 million tons, which was an increase of 65 thousand tons over the expected output of 1958. At that period, Ke Qingshi, the top leader of southeast China and Shanghai, arrived in Beijing. His enthusiasm for local steel production apparently influenced Mao.

When the Politburo convened a meeting on June 17 (Mao did not attend), Bo Yibo said the steel production was expected to be 9 million tons. However, when he met with Mao on June 18, he agreed with Mao to further raise the steel production to 10 million tons. After the meeting, Mao told Bo that the agriculture had found the approach leading to the Great Leap Forward, which was called "take grain as the key link and achieve overall development (Chinese: 以粮为纲，全面发展)." Mao asked Bo what the people in industry was doing. Bo answered that the industry would "take steel as the key link and drive everything (Chinese: 以钢为纲，带动一切)," which earned Mao's approving "correct, very correct!" The next day, Mao again asked Wang Heshou why they could not double the steel production target. Wang, while indicating this would be difficult, could only reply "it should be alright." Thus the steel target of 1958 was set at 11 million tons.

=== Emerging Small Cooperatives ===
In the first half of 1958, the agricultural sector kept "launching satellites", which meant rural areas in the country constantly reported extremely high production output. On June 16, Qian Xuesen, a famous rocket scientist who returned to China from the U.S. in 1955, published his article in China Youth News and argued that one mu (= 0.0667 hectares) producing 5 tons of grain was possible. In July, the editorial of People's Daily said "how much grain we need, how much grain we can produce." The forces of production developed dramatically, which influenced the transition of the relations of production to meet the needs of higher production output and communism.

The seeds of the communes sprouted during the water conservancy campaign of winter 1957–1958. In the certain areas threatened by floods in summer, some of the small collectives merged into larger units. In Chengdu Conference, Mao Zedong put forward the idea of merging agricultural production cooperatives and endorsed the winter mergers.

On April 8, the Central Committee approved a document, which underscored that it was necessary to systematically and adequately integrate small-scale agricultural cooperatives into large cooperatives. The purpose was to "meet the demands of agricultural production and cultural revolution." As of July 1958, in Liaoning Province, 9,297 agricultural cooperatives merged into 1,461 larger cooperatives. Every cooperative had 1,995 households averagely. Henan Province merged 38,286 cooperatives into more than 2700 larger cooperatives. The average number of households was about 4,000 per cooperative. However, Henan Province also put an illustration of the resistance. Pan Fusheng, the first secretary of the Party's Provincial Committee, was against the rapid amalgamation of cooperatives and said that the peasants would revolt and reject the leadership of the Communist Party. But he was purged in May 1958.

On July 1, Chen Boda, the Chief Editor of the party journal Red Flag, released the article named "New Society, New People." Without being discussed by the Central Committee, the article claimed that China had found its way to communism, and first mentioned the term "people's commune." On the same day, in his speech to students at Peking University, Chen quoted Mao and said that people needed to gradually and systematically form large communes combining agriculture, industry, commerce, culture, and education, and militia. Jack Gary argued that the word "communes" referred to Paris Commune, implying that this emerging organization in China was part of the Marxist theory. Also, it was Mao's solution to the problem of the bureaucratic state.

Mao did not accept the term until he inspected rural areas on the spot in August 1958. On his tour, Mao permitted communes ahead of any formal documents adopted by the Central Committee. On 9 August in Shandong Province, Mao conspicuously gave his preference to people's communes. He said that it was good to establish people's communes, which was paraphrased by People's Daily to the famous political slogan "people's communes are good (人民公社好)."

=== Khrushchev's Visit ===
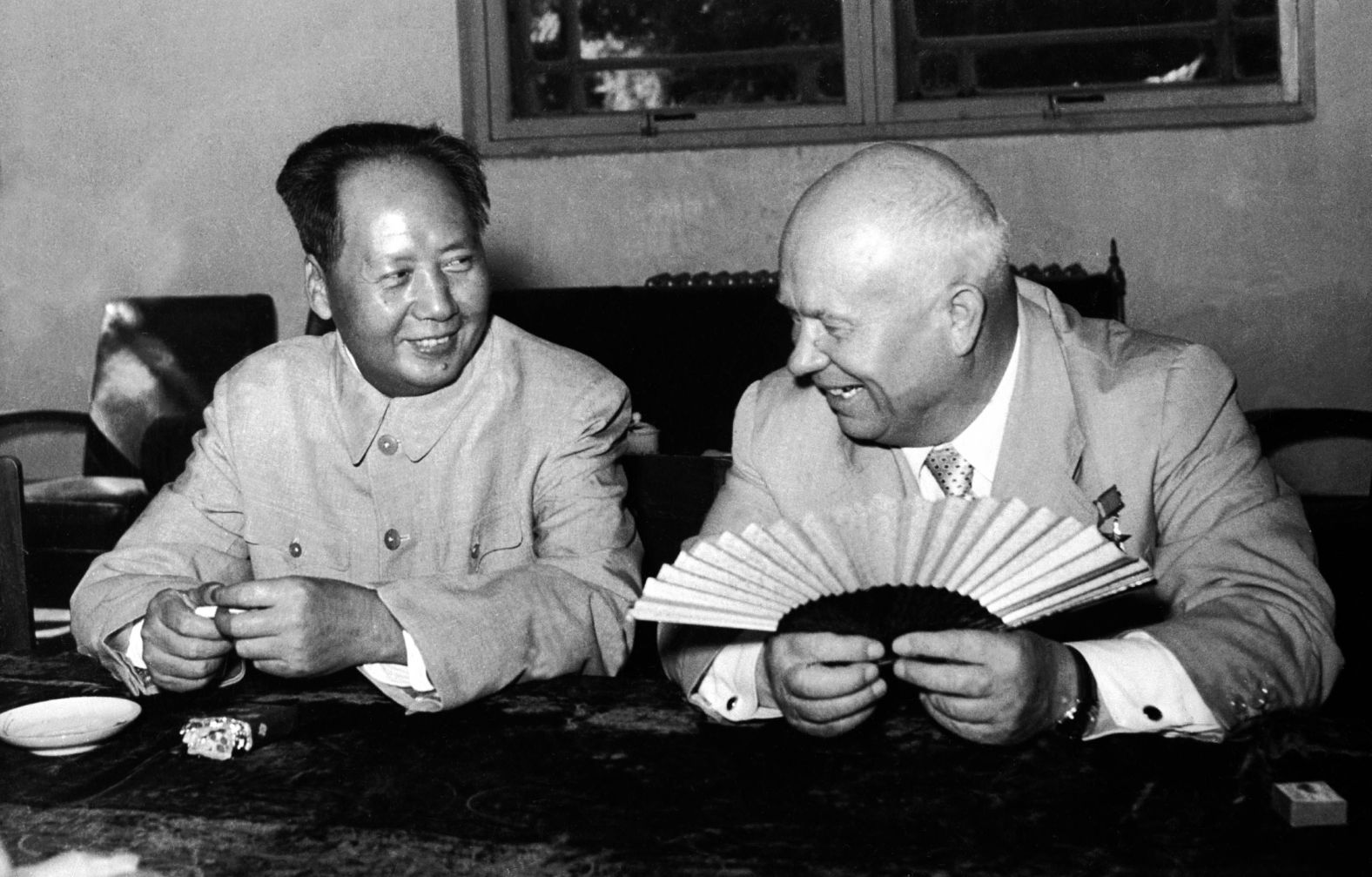
In August 1958, Mao met with Nikita Khrushchev in Beijing.

Before Beidaihe Conference, the relations between China and the Soviet Union had been strained. The reasons included whether China should manufacture atomic bombs and whether to build longwave broadcasting stations and combined fleets together. On 22 July, Mao met with Pavel Yudin, the Soviet Union Ambassador to China. Mao described the combined fleets as "navy cooperatives" and directly repudiated the suggestion. He told Yudin that the Soviet Union tried to control the atomic energy because they did not believe that China could make it. He also said,

"I can go to Moscow to talk with Comrade Khrushchev or invite him to Beijing. ... The Soviet Union can be the counselor and help us to build the nuclear submarine, but why do you raise the issue of half the ownership? ... You can tell Comrade Khrushchev that we do not have to talk if he has additional conditions."

After an increase of the divergence between the two socialist countries, including the revisionism of Yugoslavia and the landing of U.S. Marines in Lebanon, the supreme leaders of the two sides met in the summer of 1958 secretly. From 31 July to 3 August, Nikita Khrushchev had four formal meetings with Mao in Beijing. In the first meeting, Khrushchev said Yudin to some extent mistakenly conveyed their position. The CPSU had not discussed the idea of combine fleets. It was only raised by the Ministry of National Defense and Malinovsky (then Soviet Defense Minister). During the summit, Mao allowed building the radar station in China, whose ownership belonged to China and half right of use belonged to the Soviet Union. Khrushchev repeatedly said the Soviet Union could provide loan on building the radar station. However, Mao rejected resolutely and said China would not build it if the Soviet Union offered the money.

Most records of the meetings have not been disclosed yet. Allen S. Whiting teases out two main points of the sessions: First, Mao did not tell Khrushchev his plan to bombard Kinmen; Second, some Sino-Soviet shared military facilities in the PRC aroused contention and disagreement Shen Zhihua argues that Mao did not discuss the impending bombardment with Khrushchev on purpose. But Mao insisted that Khrushchev should publicly return to the Soviet Union and gave a speech. Mao intended to create an impression to the U.S. that the military operation was the result of Sino-Soviet negotiations.

== Participants of Beidaihe Conference (1958) ==
The Politburo Members: Mao Zedong, Liu Shaoqi, Zhou Enlai, Zhu De, Chen Yun, Deng Xiaoping and others.

The Responsible members of government departments: Li Fuchun, Li Xiannian, Tan Zhenlin, Bo Yibo, Wang Heshou, Zhao Erlu, Wu Lengxi and others.

The First Secretaries of provinces, municipalities and autonomous regions: Ke Qingshi, Li Jingquan, Tao Zhu, Wang Renzhong, Ou Yangqin, Lin Tie, Zhang Desheng, Wu Zhipu, Zeng Xisheng, Zhang Zhongliang and others.

== Industrial and Agricultural Production ==
=== The Communique ===
On 1 September 1958, People's Daily published the conference communique on the front page. It illustrated the linchpin of developing industry from two perspectives.

First, the previous success in agriculture laid the foundation for the industry. Mao was ambitious since the CCP transferred the ownership in rural areas peacefully; meanwhile, the agricultural outputs would be promising due to the surprisingly good weather in the first half of 1958. According to him, agriculture was the "green leaves," and industry was the "red flowers." The Soviet Union developed agriculture and industry at the same time, but China would take a different approach; Chinese developed the green leaves first then the red flowers. In another speech, he also said: "we used agriculture to repress industry, checked industry's king." In all, it was time for the industry to take off.

Second, the first secretaries of all provinces and districts must pay attention to leading the industrial development. To be specific, Mao urged local leaders to take steel production as the crucial task, and when they returned home, they should "establish the proletarian dictatorship with effective regulations."

=== Chaos in Industry ===
Mao designated industry as the principal topic of the conference, with both the 1959 plan and the Second Five-year Plan. Moreover, he repeatedly demanded priority attention to the doubled steel target and feared it might not be met.

Bo Yibo included more details about Mao's misgivings in his memoir. In early 1958, Mao believed that excessive centralization had restrained economic development. In April, the CCP made provisions on decentralizing enterprises. Two months later, the party adopted the decision to decentralize heavy and light industry. However, fast decentralization immediately disordered industry in regional areas. Many capital construction projects (Chinese: 基本建设项目) were set up, which dispersed the limited iron and later hindered the national industrial objective.

In Beidaihe Conference, Mao talked about the problems in industry and his solutions. First, the current industrial production was lack of priority projects. Mao said that the projects impinging on priorities must be centralized. The Agricultural Production Cooperatives which participated in producing steel exemplified that they dispersed the energy and should be stopped or canceled. Second, local government did not effectively implement the central policy. Mao emphasized that iron and steel could not be transferred out of localities because of "hundreds of thousands of governments" in local areas. In this part, Mao described his solutions in many ways: Qin Shihuang, autocracy, proletarian dictatorship and socialist order.

Ironically, it was Chen Yun, one of the two leading architects of Anti-Rash Advance, who assured the doubled steel target could be met, devised methods to that end and invoked Party discipline to guarantee it. On 21 August 1958, Chen Yun said that Chairman Mao's critique on Central Finance Group, State Planning Commission, State Economic and Trade Commission and central ministries were correct, which meant everybody was making plans, rather than focusing on producing. The problems in the industrial sector included omitting the production in 1958 and low output of peasants' backyard furnaces. Meanwhile, the Central Committee could not transfer raw materials efficiently among areas and sectors, because local governments did not adjust the country's newest production objective. They thought they had finished the task and begun to stock raw materials. After reporting to Mao, Chen listed out eight solutions. The principal one was that State Economic and Trade Commission should mainly focus on production, and the secretary of the party and the director in each factory should take the production output of 1958 as the core.

At the end of the conference, Bo Yibo called all the provincial secretaries responsible for steel to meet Mao, and one by one they guaranteed fulfillment of their targets.

== People's Communes ==
=== The Resolution ===
On August 29, the conference adopted the Resolution of Establishing People's Communes in Rural Areas. The Resolution considered people's communes as a natural trend. It said that the people's commune was mainly based on continuously developing agricultural production and peasants' growing political consciousness. Peasants in rural areas would combine small cooperatives with big cooperatives, and transit to communes simultaneously. The Resolution also suggested the party and the masses make good use of people's communes as a concrete way to communism. Besides, the resolution warned against communalizing cooperatives compulsively and insisted on the socialist rather than the communist character of people's communes.

Prior to this, Mao Zedong added a passage on the draft resolution. He emphasized that local areas should not be rash in changing the collective ownership of people's communes to the ownership by the whole people, aiming to "stave off unnecessary troubles in the transition of ownership."

=== Mao's Speeches ===
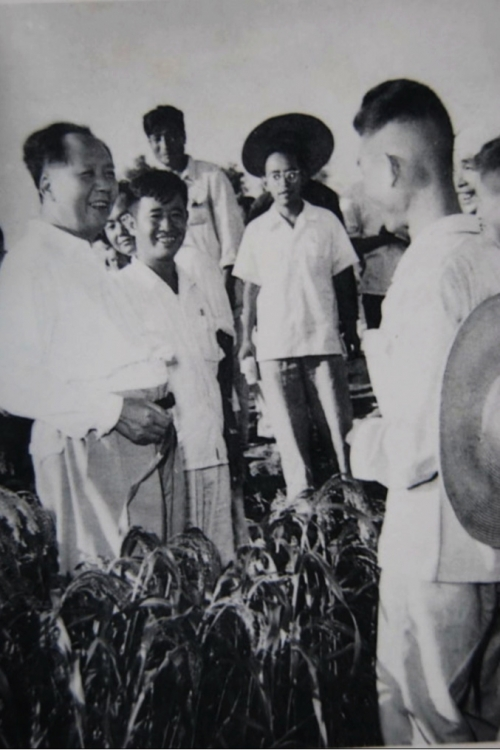
Xushui Prefecture became the pilot project of communism in May due to merging cooperatives in the water conservancy movement. In mid-July, the prefecture was communalized by establishing 1,777 mess halls. Mao inspected Xushui Prefecture during his tour in rural areas in August 1958. He told the leader of the communes that if they produced massive outputs of grain, they could have 5 meals per day.

During the conference, Mao Zedong gave many speeches on the issue of people's communes, including how to define, organize and benefit from people's communes. In April 1958, the first people's commune, Chayashan Sputnik Commune, was built in Henan Province. During the conference, Mao read the sputnik commune's trial constitution and wrote: "this constitution seemed to be sent to every province and prefecture for reference." It defined the people's commune as a social grassroots organization, which aimed to consolidate socialist system, create conditions and prepare for transitioning to the communist system. In Mao's conclusion, people's communes were based on "socialist system plus communist ideology." People's communes with socialist nature would eradicate the bourgeoisie vestiges, for instance, private plot and private livestock, step by step, and realize communist society within a few years. Mao also suggested a specific approach to organize communes. It was put forward by the people's commune in Xushui Prefecture. The slogan is "organize along military lines, working as if fighting a battle, live in a disciplined way (Chinese: 组织军事化、行动战斗化、生产纪律化)." Mao was conspicuously satisfied with the slogan, though he did not force nationwide prefectures to imitate it. He said that the slogan was virtually about the issue of organization and democracy in people's communes.

According to Mao, the benefits of people's communes were based on the highly unified planning and management. When Mao was on his ten-day tour in early August, he told the cadres (leaders of Shandong provinces) that they could combine workers, peasants, merchants, students, and soldiers by establishing people's communes. It means that people's communes should be multifunctional, including producing both means of production and consumption, educating youth and maintaining social order. As Mao put it, it was the integration of government (administration) and commune (management) (Chinese: 政社合一).

The characteristic of people's communes was well known as "one, big, and two, public (yi da, er gong; Chinese: 一大二公)." In Mao's opinion, "big" (largeness) means the communes had a large population and covered huge areas, and "public" (publicness) referred to the socialist nature, manifesting as public mess halls, wage system in combination of the supply system and high labor efficiency.

== Socialist and Communist Education in Rural Areas ==
According to Mao, re-centralization of industrial production would stop the backyard steel furnaces built by cooperatives and communes, which could dampen the masses in rural areas. Hence, when dealing with this problem, he used two different narratives in the mass media and the secret speeches. In the editorial published by People's Daily after the conference, the slogan remained as "the whole party and the whole people running industry." The editorial also highly appreciated peasants' creativity and enthusiasm. In his secret speeches, however, Mao said that the Agricultural Production Cooperatives' main task was expanding grain production. Mao kept the balance between the peasants' independence and the party's rule. From the discourse level, peasants should be under the party's commander, because they produced grain for the country, but for themselves after all. From the policy level, the CCP decided to launch a socialist and communist education campaign from the winter of 1958.

In the Directive on Launching Socialist and Communist Education Campaign, the education campaign first aimed to ensure the agricultural harvest of the 1959 summer and the whole year. It would popularize the experience of agricultural production, for instance, how to use water, fertilizer, and soil efficiently and how to plant close and plow deeply. Second, through airing their views fully, the peasants would be aware of the greater superiority of people's communes over agricultural cooperatives.

More importantly, the education campaign initiated another movement in communes named "Pull down the White Flag and Hoist the Red Flag (Chinese: 拔白旗，插红旗)." Socialist and communist thinking that followed the Party's line and the cadres' orders was rewarded with a "red flag," whereas individualistic thinking or "unhealthy ideas" were denounced and given a "white flag," "gray flag," or "black flag." The purpose of this movement was to clear the ideological and organizational obstacle for the Great Leap Forward.

== Bourgeois Right ==
Bourgeois right was a notion discussed by Marx and Lenin, which referred to the capitalist remnants in the socialist society. It was represented as the sale of commodities in a market, and the distribution to work, which would produce inequalities because of the unequal distribution of skills and capacities in the work force.

Bourgeois right appeared in most of Mao's speeches during Beidaihe Conference, but much of his thinking was summarized in Zhang Chunqiao's article. Ke Qingshi, who was present at the conference, had read out to Zhang, the propaganda minister of Shanghai Municipal Committee, over the telephone his notes of Mao's thoughts on bourgeois right. Later Zhang wrote the article named "Eradicate the Ideology of Bourgeois Right" (also translated as "Do Away with the Ideology of Bourgeois Right"; Chinese: 破除资产阶级法权思想) which was highly regarded by Mao. On October 13, the People's Daily republished the article under Mao's order and added an "editor's note" written by Mao. Mao's address in Beidaihe Conference, by and large, reflected the origin bourgeois right in the context of the Great Leap Forward. From then on, the term "bourgeois right," which originated from Marx's Critique of the Gotha Programme, provoked extensive discussion in China.

=== The Interrelationship among the People ===
The relations of production in agriculture and industry included the system of ownership, the interrelationship among the people and the distribution. According to Mao, Marx, Engels, Lenin and Stalin "have heard about these ideas but have not begun to understand them." In the conference, he further demonstrated his viewpoints on the interrelationship among people and the distribution. Mao's discussion of the bourgeois right analyzed the limitations of the Soviet-derived model that had influenced the Chinese approach in the early 1950s, particularly how changing ownership through socialism does not eliminate problems of social relations under socialism.

First, the interrelationship among laboring people was the principal element of productive relations. On the one hand, Mao thought that the bourgeois right had been almost eradicated after the rectification, which manifested that the leading cadres served the people humbly. On the other hand, Mao took the children of Soviet Union leaders, for example, implying that the CCP leaders' children should not have privileges.

Second, Mao, to some extent moderately, considered the supply system as the alternative of the wage system. The bourgeois right in the distribution had not been wiped out, which included eight-grade wage system and the difference between mental work and manual work. These remnants resulted in severe problems of cadres-masses relationship. For instance, after the CCP succeeded in revolution and entered the cities, they replaced the communist supply system with wage system. The cadres began to wear woolen clothes and shave beards. All of these were learned from the bourgeoisie and connected with the bureaucratic work style. Mao repeatedly underscored that the CCP should bring back the rural work style and guerrilla practices, which could prevent the party from being detached from the masses.

Moreover, Mao was rather zealous in comparing supply system with wage system, promoting the benefits of the former. Mao thought that supply system was related to his health. He said that his body was not well and easy to catch a cold after he moved to Beijing, though he got the salary monthly and lived in bigger houses. Another benefit of supply system hinged on its communist spirit. Mao unequivocally upheld the utopian socialism and said that living without communist spirit would be boring.

=== Practical Strategy ===
The connection between the bourgeois right and the principal issue of the conference referred to Mao's concern behind his speeches. In the Second Session of 8th National Party Congress, Mao said that the practice of the CCP had surpassed Marx, so he hoped to create another way to develop faster and better than the Soviet Union and Eastern European countries. The "another way" - the Great Leap Forward and the people's communes - caused a "theoretical vacuum," which meant Lenin's New Economic Policy was not suitable to current situations and China's development needed new theoretical basis. Specifically, it included following points:

First, eradicating bourgeois right was one of the effective political mobilization slogans of people's communes. In people's communes, the masses cooperated with each other and did not earn piece wage, which represented precisely the germ of communism and the disruption of bourgeois right. In Mao's mind, people's communes were characterized as "big" and "public." The "public" precisely advocated collectivism, rather than individualism, implying the eradication of wage system.

Second, the interrelationship among the masses was the premise of the Great Leap Forward. Mao attributed the success of revolution to the war communism including rustic and guerrilla work style. He believed that military tradition had worked so efficiently in the war that it could also function well in building communism. The essential point was the equal interrelationship advocated by the party, which could mobilize the masses to pay efforts into production.

At last, eradication of bourgeois right was part of the strategy to demarcate China from the Soviet Union. The inharmonious relationship between the cadres and the masses, the children of leading cadres and the wage system within material incentives, represented how the leading socialist country in the world degenerated into a bureaucratic state. Mao tried to find an alternative to break free of the superstition to Soviet Elder Brother.

== The Second Taiwan Strait Crisis ==
The Second Taiwan Strait Crisis happened in the session of the conference.

During the conference, Mao made the final decision to bombard Kinmen (Quemoy) Island, which was controlled by the Nationalist Government in Taiwan. On 18 August, Mao wrote to Peng Dehuai (the Defense Minister) to prepare to bombard Kinmen. The guideline of the bombardment was directly against Chiang Kai-shek and indirectly against the U.S. On the 20th, Mao asked the Ye Fei, the commander of the bombardment, whether the shells could avoid hitting the U.S. military facilities. On 23 August, the People's Liberation Army started to bombard Kinmen Island. Harold Hinton holds that the date was chosen deliberately because it was the anniversary of the Nazi-Soviet pact. Mao used it to remind Khrushchev of the danger of compromising with imperialism.

According to Wu Lengxi, the Chief Editor of People's Daily, Mao mentioned the purpose of the bombardment in the Politburo meeting on 23rd. It was that the U.S. withdrew forces from the Taiwan Strait, Chiang Kai-shek retreated from Kinmen and Matsu. Mao believed the military operation would shock the world.

For more details about the background and the course of the Crisis, see below:

Wikipedia - Second Taiwan Strait Crisis (English version) and 金门炮战 (Chinese version)

== Aftermath ==
First, from the economic view, Table 1 shows the gross industrial output of mainland China from 1957 to 1959. The annual rate of growth varied between 7.8 and 31.7 percent during 1953–57. The substantially higher rates of growth reported for 1958 and the first half of 1959 have resulted chiefly from the mass movement in industrial construction and production in 1958, during which Beidaihe Conference was convened. The mushrooming of small units using indigenous methods of production also contributed to the growth of rate in the latter part of 1958. However, the industrial production using indigenous methods was, in most cases, not up to the quality standards and resulted in an uneconomic use of labor.

Table 1. Gross Industrial Output in mainland China, 1957–59
Year	1. GROSS VALUE OUTPUT (In thousand million yuan at 1957 prices)	2. INCREASE OVER PRECEDING YEAR (per cent)
1957	70.4	
1958	117.0	66.2
1959 (January–June)	72.9	64.6

Second, after Beidaihe conference, the nationwide rural areas became communalized no more than one month. The high tide of establishing people's communes caused severe tensions within the state administrative apparatuses and between cadres and peasants. The sign was the state's decreasing ability to procure grain. By the end of October 1958, the amount of state grain reserves had been reduced by some 7 million tons. Some peasants in Guangdong Province hid the grain production to avoid great procurement.

In October 1958, Mao was receiving feedback on the situation and became aware of the significant problems in the Great Leap Forward. On first Zhengzhou Conference in November 1958, Mao addressed the issues of the excessive leap and called for more calmness.

== See also ==
- Great Leap Forward
- People's Commune
- Three Red Banners
- Five-year Plans of China
- Mao Zedong
