= Launching satellites =

Chinese expression

- Chinese: 放卫星
- Meaning: refers to the exaggerated achievements in the Great Leap Forward

The expression 'launching satellites' (Chinese: 放卫星, Pinyin: 'fang weixing'), alternatively translated as "putting satellites into orbit", refers to a socialist construction campaign that began in 1958 during the "Great Leap Forward" and was anxious for success by 1959. During the Great Leap Forward, exaggeration was prevalent throughout China, with false reports exaggerating food production, and these false reports of "wheat satellites", "rice satellites", "grain satellites", "tobacco satellites", and other similar acts in various industries were unanimously called "Launching Satellites".

The term "launching satellites" was coined in honor of Sputnik 1, the first artificial Earth satellite launched by the USSR.

China successfully launched a sounding rocket in 1964 and the satellite Dong Fang Hong I in 1970.

== Background ==
=== Land reform ===
At the beginning of 1950s, as CCP gained power over the KMT, the land reform campaign began. This campaign focuses on taking lands from landlords and handing them out to the peasants, this consolidated the power of CCP and set the stage for agricultural collectivization later on.

=== Early stages of agricultural collectivization ===
Not long after, various forms of agriculture organization started to form, the most notably:

- Mutual Aid Teams
- Local Level Agriculture Producer Cooperatives

But currently the organizations are limited in size, members have individual choice and are quite efficient.

=== More agricultural collectivization ===
In the later years of 1950s, higher level Local Level Agriculture Producer Cooperatives started to form, this organization contains thousands of peasants, and still allowed individual choices of the peasants to a certain degree.

=== Full on agricultural collectivization ===
In 1958, People's communes were formed, and started full agricultural collectivization, individual choices were not allowed anymore. This led to the lack of incentives to work from the peasants and the general decrease in production efficiency.

=== The term “Launching satellites” ===
On 4 October 1957, the Soviet Union launched the first ever man made satellite to space, named “Sputnik 1”.

The success shocked the world, and also turned out to be a huge propaganda success.

As the Soviet Union was the most powerful communist country at the time, communist China under Mao was deeply impressed and wanted to replicate the success of such a magnitude.

Later this sentiment turned into a political obsession of the search for incredible feats under communism.

=== Great Leap Forward ===
After the early success of agricultural collectivization, Mao was emboldened and launched a campaign “Great Leap Forward”, with the slogan “Exceeding the UK, catching the USA”.

With an unusual sense of optimism, the entire country started working tirelessly and communes started to compete with one another in terms of agricultural production.

== See also ==
- Chinese space program
