= Practice is the Sole Criterion for Testing Truth =

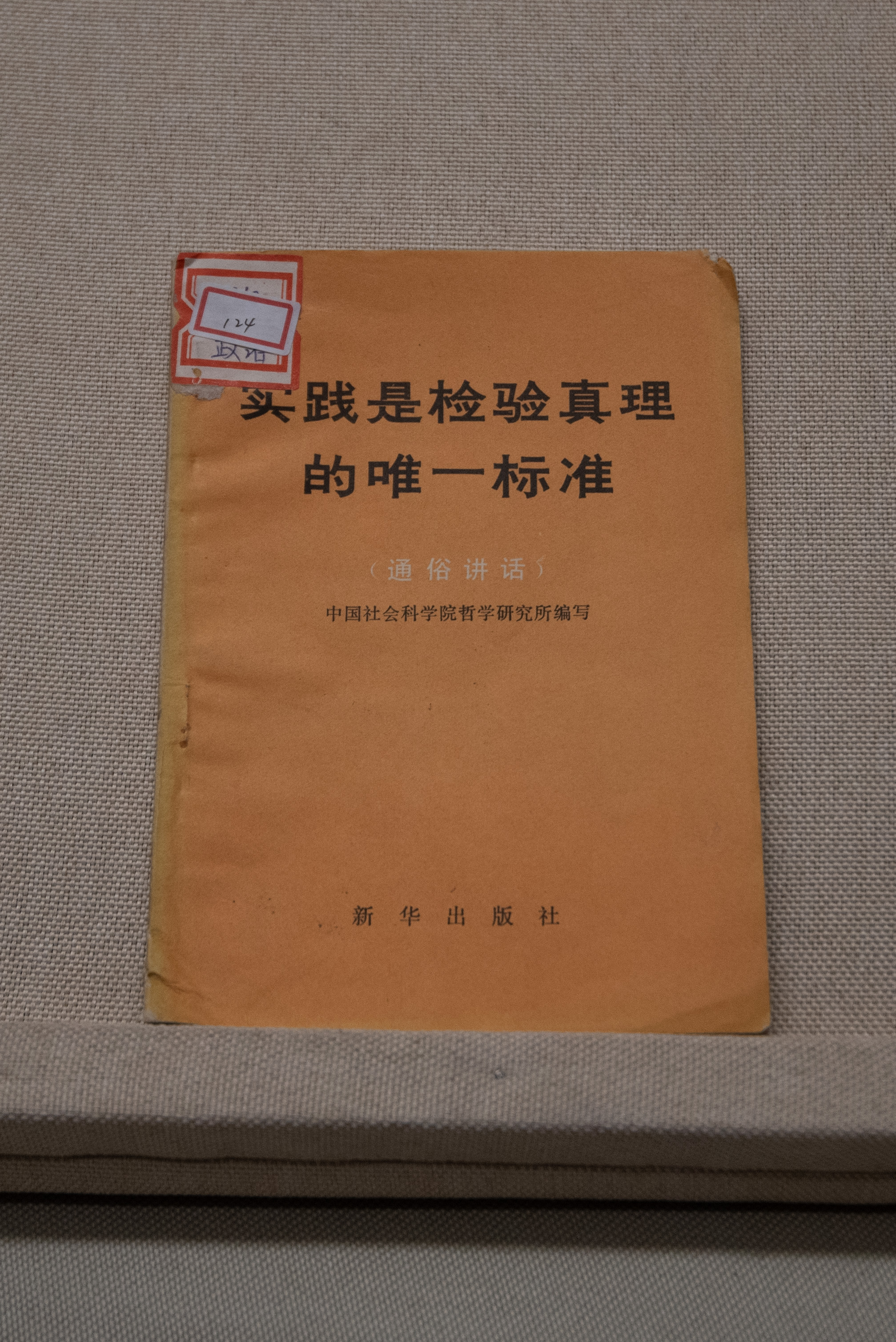
The first edition of "Practice Is the Sole Criterion for Testing Truth," compiled by the Institute of Philosophy, Chinese Academy of Social Sciences

The Practice is the Sole Criterion for Testing Truth (Chinese: 实践是检验真理的唯一标准; pinyin: Shíjiàn shì jiǎnyàn zhēnlǐ de wéiyī biāozhǔn) is an article originally written by Hu Fuming, a teacher in the Department of Philosophy at Nanjing University. After being revised by many people, it was finally reviewed and approved by Hu Yaobang, Head of the Organization Department of the Chinese Communist Party. The article was published by Guangming Daily on 11 May 1978, and by People's Daily and People's Liberation Army Daily on 12 May. The article marked the beginning of the Truth Criterion Discussion in China and was an important part of the Boluan Fanzheng led by Deng Xiaoping, Hu Yaobang and others. It provided the theoretical justification for abandoning the policies of the Cultural Revolution and the foundation of the reform and opening up period.

== History ==
In February 1977, the Two Newspapers and One Journal published an editorial entitled Study the Documents and Grasp the Key Points, which put forward the Two Whatevers: "We will resolutely uphold all decisions made by Chairman Mao and follow all instructions of Chairman Mao." Hu Fuming, who had just experienced the Cultural Revolution, believed that Mao Zedong's remarks should not be understood in such a dogmatic way, so he decided to write an article to refute this view. However, he hesitated a lot before deciding to write this article. After thinking it over, he decided to write this article pointing out the idealism of the Two Whatevers. Finally, in the hospital where he was staying, he titled it "Practice is the Criterion for Testing Truth". After the Guangming Daily revised the article, the title was finally set as Practice is the Sole Criterion for Testing Truth.

The article was first published on 10 May 1978, in the 60th issue of Theoretical Dynamics, an internal publication of the Central Party School. The next day, Guangming Daily published the full text on its front page under the name of "Special Commentator of this newspaper". At that time, Hua Guofeng was visiting North Korea and was unaware of it. On the same day, Xinhua News Agency forwarded the article. On 12 May, People's Daily and People's Liberation Army Daily reprinted it at the same time. On 13 May, several provincial newspapers reprinted it at the same time. Within a few days, the article spread throughout the country.

The article contains more than 7,000 words and advocates that truth can only be tested by social practice; one of the most basic principles of Marxism is the unity of theory and practice; all the revolutionary leaders, including Marx, Engels, Lenin, Stalin, and Mao, insisted on testing truth through practice; any theory must be constantly tested by practice. Since the publication of this article, the great debate on the criterion of truth has swept the country and ultimately shook the theoretical foundation of Hua Guofeng's rule—the Two Whatevers. With Hua Guofeng's self-criticism at the Central Committee of the Chinese Communist Party's working conference and the convening of the third plenary Session of the 11th CCP Central Committee at the end of 1978, Deng Xiaoping gradually replaced Hua Guofeng and took control of the highest power of the Party and the state.

Hu Fuming later said in an interview: "The views in the article are not my original ideas. Every philosophy teacher in the university understands them. It was just that I wrote them out at a special 'time point'." In the article Practice is the Sole Criterion for Testing Truth, Marx said that "people should prove the truth of their thinking in practice" and Mao Zedong said that "the criterion of truth can only be social practice". What was not mentioned in the article was that Hu Shih said in 1921 that one of the core views of John Dewey's experimentalism was that "experiment is the only touchstone of truth". This concept can be traced back to Charles Sanders Peirce. In 1954, when the CCP criticized Hu Shi, it said that this was different from the view of Marxism. Hu Shih's experimentalism was criticized by the CCP as idealism.

== Legacy ==
Before his death, Ma Peiwen, former deputy editor-in-chief and director of the theoretical department of Guangming Daily, published A Major Historical Fact That Must Be Clarified, responding to the view among the central party history researchers that the article was completed at the behest of Deng Xiaoping, and pointing out that the creation and publication of the article had no direct relationship with Deng Xiaoping.

In 2019, the "Chinese Language Textbook for Senior High Schools" compiled by the Ministry of Education was officially put into use, and included the full text of Practice is the Sole Criterion for Testing Truth.

== See also ==
- Seek truth from facts
- Zhdanov Doctrine
