= Science in China (editorial) =

2000 scientific editorial by Jiang Zemin

"Science in China" (Chinese: 科学在中国：意义与承诺) is an editorial written by Jiang Zemin, then General Secretary of the Chinese Communist Party, and published in the journal Science on June 30, 2000. It was written after Jiang was invited to write an editorial during an interview by Ellis Rubinstein, editor-in-chief of Science, in Zhongnanhai.

== Content ==
The editorial discussed China's vision for developing science and technology and expressed the Chinese government's support for the development of science and technology.

== Reactions ==
Guangming Daily commented that the editorial reflected the Chinese Communist's understanding, knowledge and attitude towards science.
