= Hunan Cultural Revolution Massacre =

Hunan Cultural Revolution Massacre may refer to any of the massacres in Hunan Province, China during the Chinese Cultural Revolution (1966–1976):

- Daoxian Massacre, in which more than 9,000 people died from August to October in 1967.
- Shaoyang County Massacre, in which 991 people died from July to September in 1968 (some scholars have pointed out that thousands of people died in reality).
