= Peng Qi'an =

Chinese official and Cultural Revolution survivor (1932–2023)

- 彭启安
- Born: 1932; Chenghai
- Died: 3 January 2023 (aged 90–91)
- Known for: Shantou Cultural Revolution Museum

Peng Qi'an (Chinese: 彭启安; pinyin: Péng Qǐ'ān; born 1932 in Chenghai – 3 January 2023) was a Chinese municipal official and survivor of the Chinese Cultural Revolution who founded a museum in Shantou to commemorate the victims of the revolution, which opened in 2005. He continued to serve as its volunteer curator. The museum was closed in 2016.

== Persecution during Cultural Revolution ==
During the Cultural Revolution, which lasted from 1966 to 1976, Peng was subjected to at least 30 criticism sessions. In 1967 he was on a list of five people for whom execution was recommended to higher authorities, due to his alleged association with a "counter-revolutionary" group named after two local leaders who had lost power.

== Later career ==
After the Cultural Revolution and rehabilitation, Peng remained in the Chinese Communist Party (CCP). From 1979 until 1983, he served as CCP Committee Secretary of Chaozhou. He later served as the executive vice mayor of Shantou, overseeing the transportation, energy and telecommunications sectors. In the subsequent years until his retirement in 1999, he served a consultant for the Shantou municipal government. In 2012 he was chosen as an "excellent party member" of Shantou.

== Chinese Cultural Revolution Museum ==
In 1996, Peng came across dozens of graves scattered around the slopes of Tashan Scenic Area. Having learned that these were victims of the Cultural Revolution who had died in 1967 and 1968, he started his efforts to turn the park into a memorial site. He used a special mayor's fund to the amount of 600,000 Renminbi, which he was entitled to use at his discretion, as start-up funds. He intensified his efforts after his retirement from public office in 1999. The district government originally opposed the construction of the museum. Friends and other officials expressed their worries to Peng that he might run afoul of authorities, but Peng remained unfazed. The total funds raised by Peng amounted to over CN¥ 10 million. The donors included many friends of Peng who were fellow survivors.

In 2003, Peng received from a friend a copy of a book by Yang Kelin (杨克林) entitled Cultural Revolution Museum. The descriptions in the book served as a blueprint for the main museum building. On 1 January 2005, the museum was officially opened as the first museum in China dedicated to the Cultural Revolution.

In 2015, Peng handed over the museum to the local government, citing his old age. In late April 2016 the museum was closed down, fenced off and all inscriptions, monuments, and more were covered up. In an interview with the New York Times, Peng expressed his belief that the order to close the museum had come not from local officials but "above", refusing further discussion of this point.
