= Tashan Scenic Area =

- Location: Chenghai, Shantou
- Area: 3,200 mus (~19.7 km²)
- Opened: 1990

The Tashan Scenic Area (simplified Chinese: 塔山风景区; traditional Chinese: 塔山風景區), literally translated to "Pagoda Mountain Scenic Spot", or Tashan Scenic Zone, is a scenic spot located in Tucheng Village, Lianshang Town, Chenghai District, Shantou City, covering an area of 3,200 mus (approx. 19.7 km²). The area is known as Tayuan (塔园), or Tower Park, and was opened to the public in 1990. Including the later-closed Cultural Revolution Museum, it contained 25 scenic spots related to the Cultural Revolution. One side of the mountain has a 900-year-old temple.

== Cultural Revolution Museum ==
On January 1, 2005, Shantou Cultural Revolution Museum, the first museum dedicated to the Cultural Revolution in China, was opened in the Tashan Scenic Area, due to the unyielding efforts of Peng Qi'an (彭启安), the former vice mayor of Shantou. In 2016, the museum was closed down.
