= Tan Qindong incident =

January 2018 incident in China

The Tan Qindong–Hongmao Medical Liquor Reputation Damage Case
- Location: Guangzhou, Guangdong Province; Liangcheng County, Inner Mongolia
- Inquiry: Local police of Liangshan county
- Accused: Tan Qindong
- Charges: Allegedly damaging the company’s reputation and product image (Article 221 - a legal offence in mainland China)
- Convictions: Hongmao company withdrew the lawsuit

The Tan Qindong incident refers to an event on January 10, 2018, in which Tan Qindong (譚秦東), a physician based in Guangzhou, was cross-provincial detained by local police from Liangcheng County, Inner Mongolia, after he published an online post criticizing Hongmao Medicinal Liquor（鴻茅藥酒）company as "toxic".

== Background ==
In recent years preceding this incident, local police have frequently detained critics of major local companies across provinces, which has been referred to as "abuse of police power" or "police acting as personal servants of businesses". Against this background, the case has attracted public attention.

Tan Qindong is a Chinese physician born in Weinan, Shaanxi. He holds a master's degree in anesthesiology and is a licensed physician in China. He has worked in hospitals and has also served as medical affairs specialist and consultant for pharmaceutical companies. In 2015, he founded a medical technology company.、

Article 221 of the Chinese criminal code is a rarely-used provision that criminalizes claims that could seriously damage a business’s reputation.

== Incident ==
In December 2017, Tan Qindong, a physician based in Guangzhou, published an online post criticizing Hongmao Medicinal Liquor, a tonic containing over 60 traditional Chinese medicinal ingredients (in his post titled “China’s Divine Wine ‘Hongmao Medicinal Liquor’, a poison from heaven” (Note: 《中国神酒“鸿毛（"毛" is a typo）药酒”，来自天堂的毒药》)). The advertisement for the product claimed it could "boost kidney and stomach functions" and "cure 100 diseases," including bone aches and common colds.

After the post, local police from Liangcheng County accused Tan of causing refund losses of approximately 800,000 yuan and severely damaging the company's reputation. They also obtained his registered ID number and phone number from the platform.

According to his lawyer, Tan was initially taken from his residence in the Tianhe District of Guangzhou on 10 January 2018 and transported to Shenzhen and then Beijing, before being held in a local detention facility by train and car, accompanied by three police officers and a company executive. Local police requested his detention on 18 January, and the request was approved by the local procuratorate on 25 January, after which he was placed in a detention center.

Dr. Tan reportly has experienced psychological distress and suicidal ideation during the detention. Dr. Tan was released on bail after prosecutors found insufficient evidence, though the case remains open and possible compensation may follow if charges are dropped.

== Comment ==
An article in Guangming Daily said that “Freedom of speech and the right to exercise oversight are fundamental rights granted to citizens by the Constitution” to this incident.

Wang Yong, a professor of commercial law at the China University of Political Science and Law in Beijing said that “This is a fairly typical instance of the public security authorities intervening in a civil dispute; it’s an overreach of power” in an interview.
