= Hu Fuming =

Chinese scholar and politician (1935–2023)

- 胡福明
- Born: July 1935; Wuxi County, China
- Died: 2 January 2023 (aged 87)
- Education: Peking University
- Alma mater: Renmin University of China; Nanjing University
- Occupations: Scholar, News Paper Editor, Politician
- Known for: Essay: Practice is the Sole Criterion for Testing Truth
- Political party: Chinese Communist Party
- Movement: Reform and Opening Up

Hu Fuming (Chinese: 胡福明; July 1935 – 2 January 2023) was a Chinese scholar and politician.

== Life ==
Fuming was born in Wuxi County, which was then part of the Republic of China, in July 1935. In September 1955, he studied journalism at Peking University. In 1956, he entered the Philosophy Research Class of Renmin University of China. After graduating in 1962, he taught at the Political Department of Nanjing University (later renamed the Department of Philosophy).

On 11 May 1978, his essay article "Practice is the Sole Criterion for Testing Truth" was published and was revised several times. He sent the article to Guangming Daily in September 1977, and then afterward spent more time studying and improving the writing of it before officially publishing it with Guangming Daily on 11 May. It had also been published on 10 May in Theoretical Dyanmics (理论动态), an internal journal of the Central Paty School, alongside Xinhua News Agency.

This publication was noteworthy in connection to the Boluan Fanzheng era. It triggered a debate on the criterion of truth, and rejected the slogan "Two Whatevers" in the country and promoted intellectual freedom. Politicians attuned to these hidden cues began issuing philosophical reflections, through which they articulated their views on Hua Guofeng’s successional legitimacy.

In November 1982, Fuming became the Deputy Minister of the Propaganda Department of the CPC Jiangsu Provincial Committee, before being appointed Minister in 1985.

In 1987, he became vice chairman of the Jiangsu Provincial Committee of the Chinese People's Political Consultative Conference.

On 18 December 2018, he was awarded the title of Pioneer of Reform.

Fuming died on 2 January 2023, at the age of 87, from COVID-19. He resided in Nanjing at Ma'anshan Road. He was also a regular smoker by the end of his life.
