= Boluan Fanzheng =

Post-Mao transition period in China

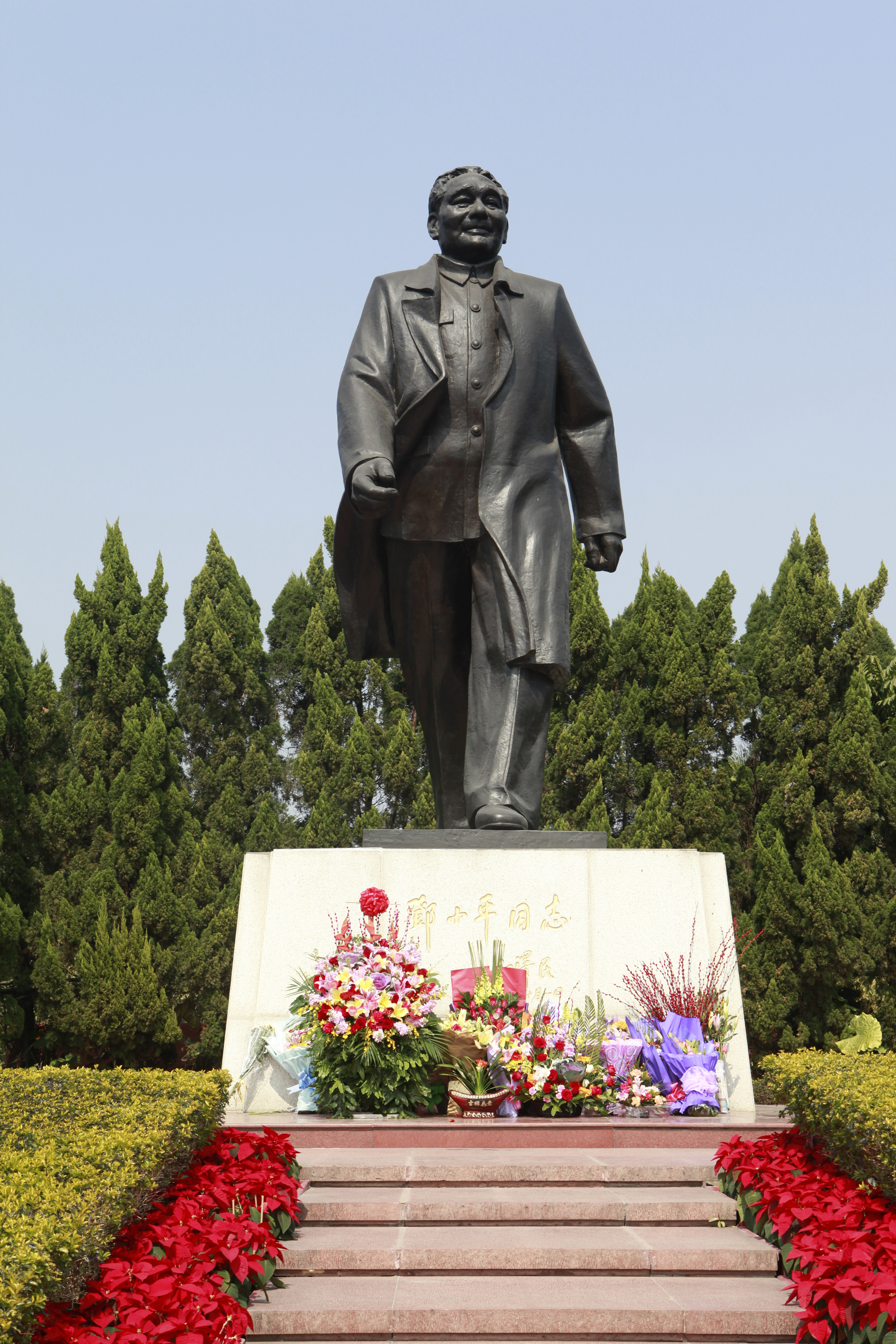
- Statue of Deng Xiaoping in Lianhuashan Park in Shenzhen
- Simplified Chinese: 拨乱反正
- Traditional Chinese: 撥亂反正
- Literal meaning: Eliminating chaos and returning to normal
Transcriptions
Standard Mandarin
- Hanyu Pinyin: bōluànfǎnzhèng
- Wade–Giles: po-luan-fan-cheng

Boluan Fanzheng (Chinese: 拨乱反正; lit. 'Eliminating chaos and returning to normal'; trans. "Setting Things Right") was a period of significant sociopolitical reforms starting with the accession of Deng Xiaoping to the paramount leadership in China in 1978. During this period, a far-reaching program of reforms was undertaken by Deng and his allies to "correct the mistakes of the Cultural Revolution", and restore order in the country. The start of the Boluan Fanzheng period is regarded as an inflection point in Chinese history, with its cultural adjustments later proven to be the bedrock upon which the parallel economic reform and opening up could take place. Aspects of a free market economy were successfully introduced to the Chinese economy, giving rise to a period of growth often characterized as one of the most impressive economic achievements in human history.

Deng, who had been in and out of favor during the Cultural Revolution, first spoke publicly of the ideas of Boluan Fanzheng in September 1977, roughly a year after the death of Mao Zedong and the subsequent arrest of the Gang of Four. With the help of allies such as Hu Yaobang, who later became the party's General Secretary, Deng was able to launch his reforms after the 3rd Plenary Session of the 11th Central Committee in December 1978, where he had ascended to the paramount leadership role. The Chinese Communist Party (CCP) and the Chinese government gradually dismantled the many distinctly Maoist policies associated with the Cultural Revolution, and rehabilitated millions of people who had been targeted during its decade of turmoil. Boluan Fanzheng lasted until the early 1980s, after which the primary focus of CCP and the Chinese government shifted from "class struggle" to further modernization and "economic construction". The subsequent speed of China's transformation in this period from one of the poorest countries to one of the world's largest economies is unmatched in history.In addition, the "1978 Truth Criterion Discussion" during the Boluan Fanzheng period was the starting point of the decade-long New Enlightenment movement in mainland China.

The reforms did not change China's status as a communist state. The period saw the enshrinement of the "Four Cardinal Principles" in the country's constitution, which upheld one-party rule in China. The Boluan Fanzheng period also saw several debates, particularly regarding on how to handle the legacies of Mao and the Cultural Revolution—namely the light treatment of figures who had been involved in the period's atrocities.

== Terminology ==
The term Boluan Fanzheng (拨乱反正) is a chéngyǔ (Chinese literary idiom) that references a line in the Gongyang commentary to the Spring and Autumn Annals of ancient China. The idiom means "correcting chaos and returning to normal".

On September 19, 1977, Deng Xiaoping first proposed the idea of "Boluan Fanzheng" during a meeting with senior officials of the Ministry of Education of China, asking the officials to correct the mistakes of Cultural Revolution in the field of education.

== Ideology ==
=== Debate over the criteria for testing truth ===
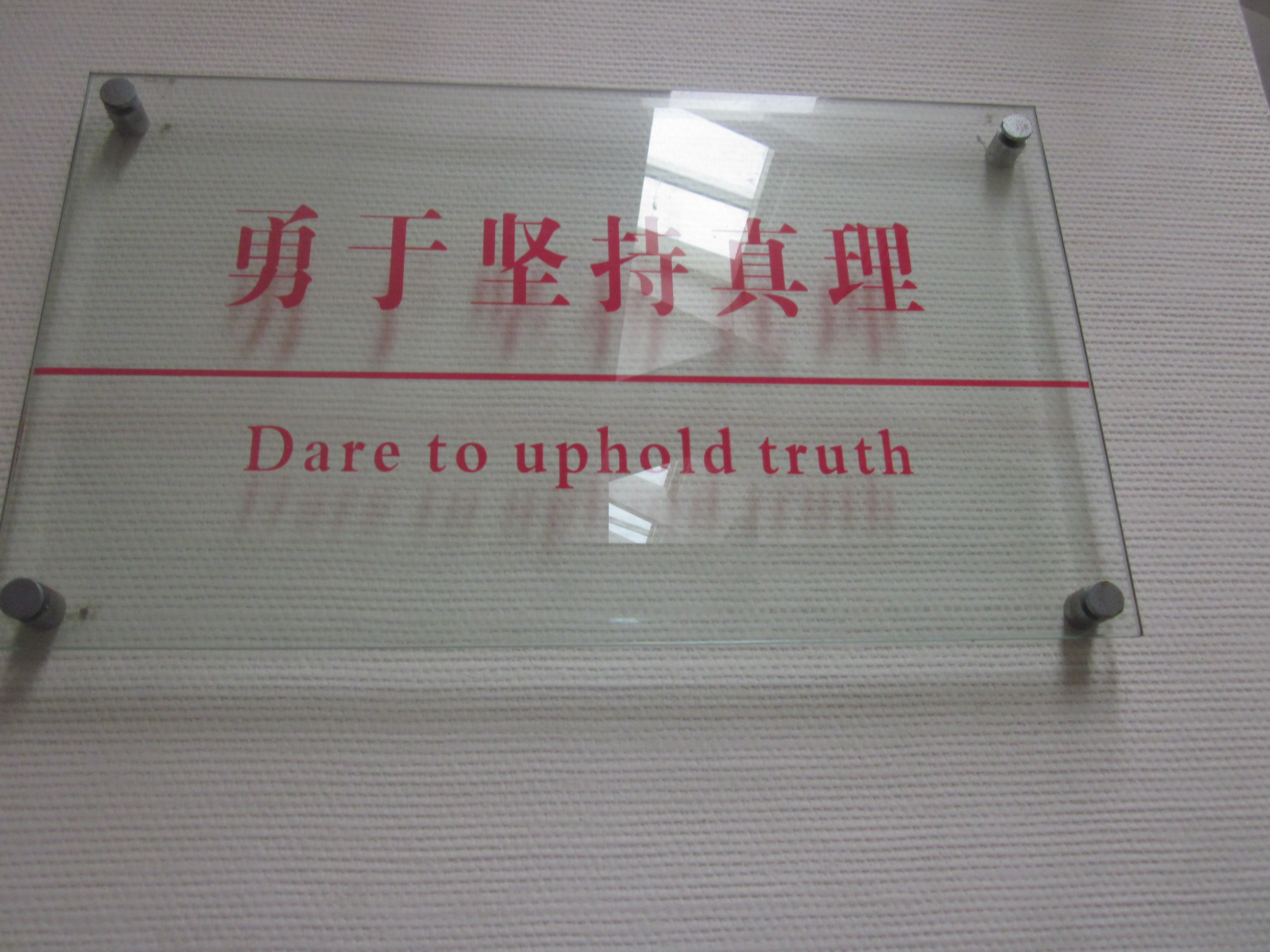
Inside Hu Yaobang's former residence.

After Mao Zedong died in September 1976, Hua Guofeng succeeded Mao as the Chairman of the Chinese Communist Party (CCP) and the Chairman of the Central Military Commission. Hua carried on most of the Maoist policies and followed the guideline of "Two Whatevers" ("Whatever Chairman Mao said, we will say and whatever Chairman Mao did, we will do").

In July 1977, with support from a number of influential senior officials such as Ye Jianying and Chen Yun, Deng Xiaoping was officially rehabilitated and was reinstated as the Vice Chairman of CCP and Vice Premier of China, after being purged (twice) by Mao during the Cultural Revolution. In May 1978, Deng, together with Hu Yaobang and other allies, initiated a large-scale debate within the Chinese society, discussing the criteria for testing truth and criticizing the ideology of "Two Whatevers". Deng and his allies endorsed the philosophy of "practice is the sole criterion for testing truth", which was first proposed in an article published by Guangming Daily on May 11, 1978, and gained widespread support from the Chinese public. The debate also gave rise to the massive "New Enlightenment movement" in mainland China which lasted over a decade, promoting democracy, humanism and universal values such as human rights and freedom.

On December 13, 1978, Deng delivered a speech at the closing ceremony of the 3rd Plenary Session of the 11th Central Committee of CCP, during which he replaced Hua Guofeng as the new paramount leader of China. In his speech titled Emancipate the Mind, Seek Truth from Facts, and Unite as One in Looking to the Future (解放思想，实事求是，团结一致向前看), Deng urged the Chinese society to seek truth from facts and pointed out that if the CCP, the whole country and the people continued to follow Maoism with stubborn mindset and blind superstition, then they would never be able to move forward and they would perish.

=== Invalidating the Cultural Revolution ===
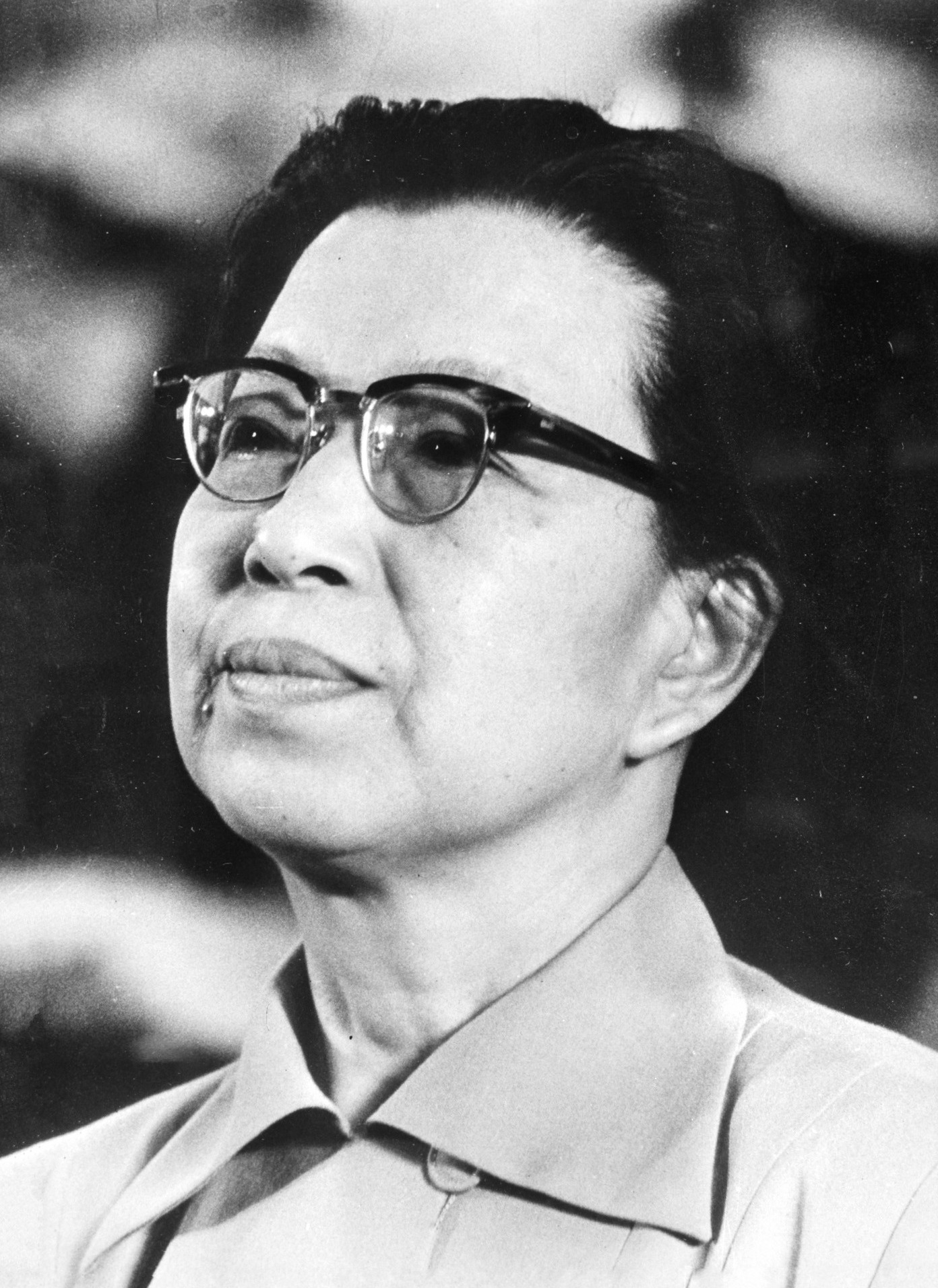
Jiang Qing, wife of Mao Zedong and a key member of the "Gang of Four".

On September 9, 1976, Mao Zedong died in Beijing, and on October 6, Hua Guofeng together with Ye Jianying, Wang Dongxing and others arrested the Gang of Four in a political coup at Huairen Hall, putting an end to the Cultural Revolution. However, after Hua Guofeng became the new paramount leader of China after Mao, he continued to follow Maoist policies and adhere to the guideline of "Two Whatevers", without invalidating the Cultural Revolution.

After Deng Xiaoping won the power struggle with Hua and became the new paramount leader of China in December 1978, he and his allies began to systematically implement the Boluan Fanzheng program in order to correct the mistakes of Cultural Revolution. Since the late 1970s, Deng and his allies gradually dismantled the Maoist line of "continuous class struggles", shifting the focus of the CCP and the Chinese government to "economic construction" as well as "modernization". In 1980–1981, Hua Guofeng eventually resigned from his positions as the Chairman of the CCP, the Chairman of the Central Military Commission and the Premier of China. Deng succeeded as the new chairman of the military, while two of his closest allies assumed the other two positions: Hu Yaobang as the new Chairman of CCP and Zhao Ziyang as the new Premier.

From November 20, 1980, to January 25, 1981, a special court under the Supreme People's Court carried out a trial of the Gang of Four and six other people, eventually announcing death penalties with a two-year reprieve for Jiang Qing and Zhang Chunqiao, and imprisonment of various terms up to life imprisonment for other members.

In June 1981, at the 6th Plenary Session of the 11th Central Committee of CCP, senior CCP officials unanimously passed the Resolution on Certain Questions in the History of Our Party since the Founding of the People's Republic of China. The resolution was drafted under the supervision of Deng Xiaoping and officially invalidated the Cultural Revolution by calling it "a domestic havoc launched mistakenly by the leader (Mao Zedong) and taken advantage of by the counter-revolutionary gangs (Lin Biao and the Gang of Four)" and that it "was responsible for the most severe setback and the heaviest losses suffered by the Party, the country, and the people since the founding of the People's Republic".

=== Views on Mao Zedong ===
The Boluan Fanzheng program launched by Deng Xiaoping did not change China's status as a communist state, and included the incorporation the "Four Cardinal Principles" into the 1982 Constitution which forbid Chinese citizens from challenging China's socialist path, Maoism, Marxism–Leninism as well as the leadership of the Chinese Communist Party.

Mao was not repudiated completely; a Mausoleum dedicated to him was built on Tiananmen Square, and the picture of Mao on Tiananmen was not removed. Deng insisted that of all the things Mao had done to the Chinese people, "70% were good and 30% were bad", while attributing many disasters in the Cultural Revolution to Lin Biao and the Gang of Four. Since his death, Mao has been viewed as a controversial figure worldwide. In the late 1970s, political dissidents in China such as Wei Jingsheng started the "Democracy Wall Movement" in Beijing, criticizing Mao as well as Maoism and the one-party rule in China while demanding democracy and freedom. However, Wei's initiatives were eventually suppressed by Deng.

== Politics and law ==
=== Rehabilitation of victims ===
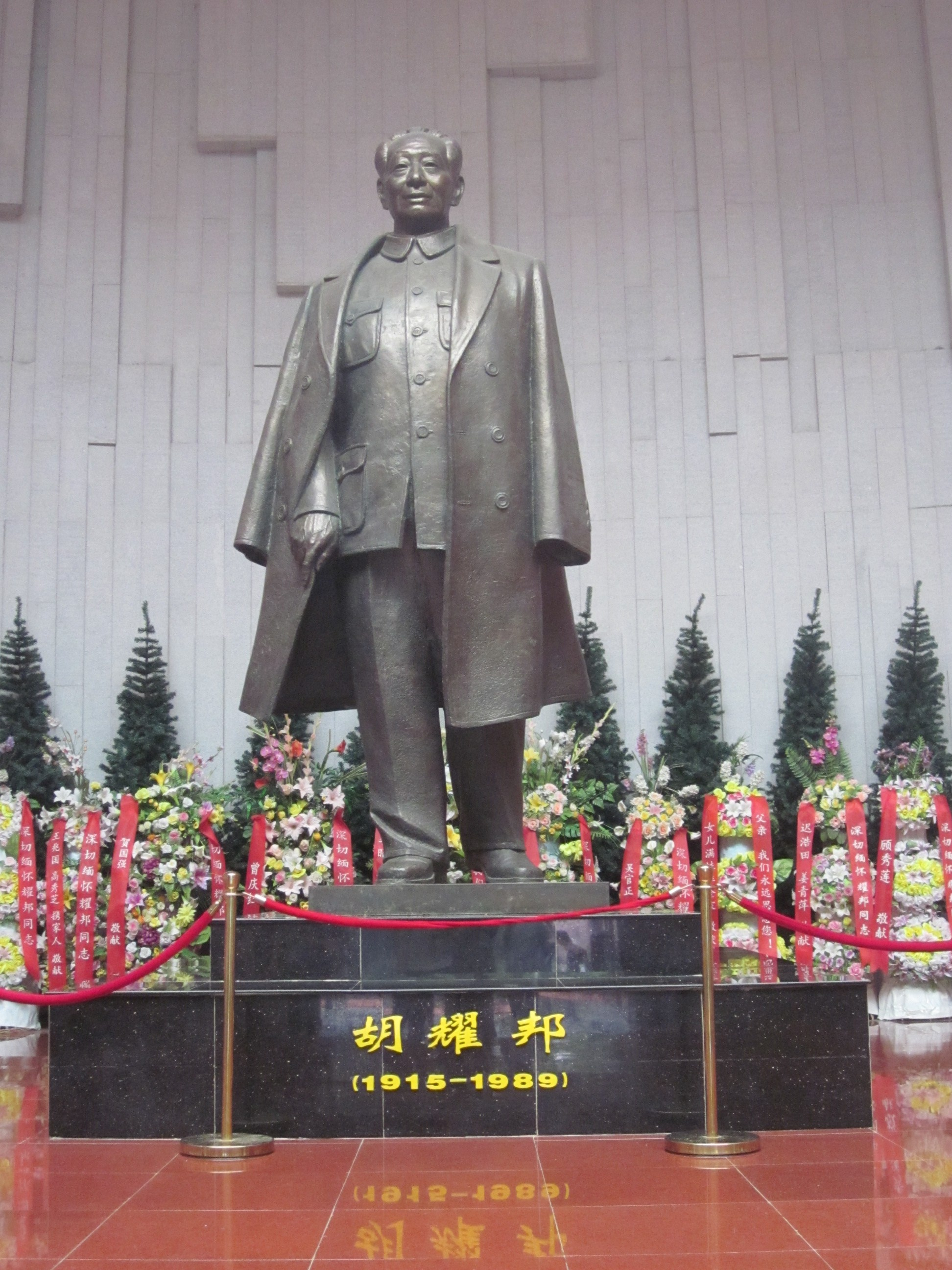
Hu Yaobang, then General Secretary of Chinese Communist Party, helped Deng Xiaoping launch the Boluan Fanzheng program and was supported by Deng to take charge of the rehabilitation of millions of victims who were persecuted in the Cultural Revolution.

During the Boluan Fanzheng period, Hu Yaobang, then General Secretary of the Chinese Communist Party (CCP), was supported by Deng Xiaoping and others to take charge of the rehabilitation of millions of victims who were persecuted in the so-called "unjust, false, erroneous cases (冤假错案)" since the Anti-rightist Campaign in 1957. Within a few years after 1978, victims in over 3 million such cases were rehabilitated. However, eventually, there were still around 100 "rightists" who did not receive official rehabilitation, notably Zhang Bojun, Luo Longji, Chu Anping and so on.

In addition to the "rightists" of the "Five Black Categories", the Central Committee of the CCP decided in January 1979 to abolish the other four discriminated social categories. According to official statistics, by 1984, around 4.4 million "landlords" and "rich farmers" had been rehabilitated, and a total of more than 20 million people who were labelled as members of the "four black categories" or their families had received rectification in their social status.

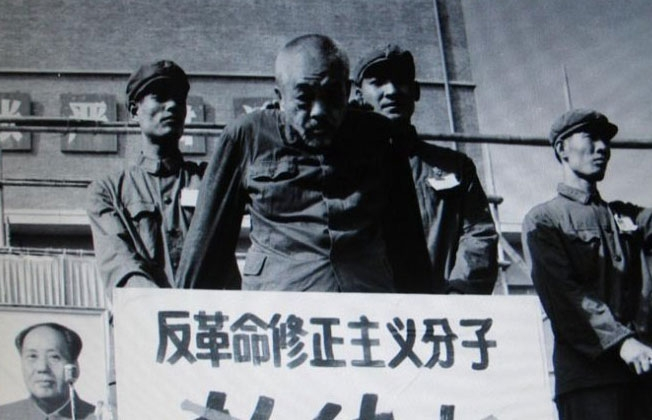
A struggle session of Marshal Peng Dehuai, who was persecuted to death during the Cultural Revolution. He was rehabilitated posthumously in December 1978.

Some of the notable victims who received official rehabilitation during the Boluan Fanzheng period are listed below. The rehabilitation of these important figures were endorsed and directed by Deng Xiaoping, Chen Yun, Hu Yaobang and other senior CCP officials.

- Liu Shaoqi, 2nd Chairman of China, who was persecuted to death during the Cultural Revolution. Liu was officially rehabilitated in February 1980, during the 5th Plenary Session of the 11th Central Committee of CCP.
- Peng Dehuai, one of the ten marshals of China and the 1st Minister of National Defense, who was persecuted to death during the Cultural Revolution. Peng was officially rehabilitated in December 1978.
- He Long, one of the ten marshals of China and Vice Premier of China, who was persecuted to death during the Cultural Revolution. He was officially rehabilitated in October 1982.
- Xi Zhongxun, senior member of CCP and father of Xi Jinping. Xi was officially rehabilitated in February 1980.
- Bo Yibo, senior member of CCP and father of Bo Xilai. Bo was officially rehabilitated in December 1978.
- Tao Zhu, senior member of CCP and member of the Politburo Standing Committee. Tao was officially rehabilitated in December 1978.

=== The Constitution ===
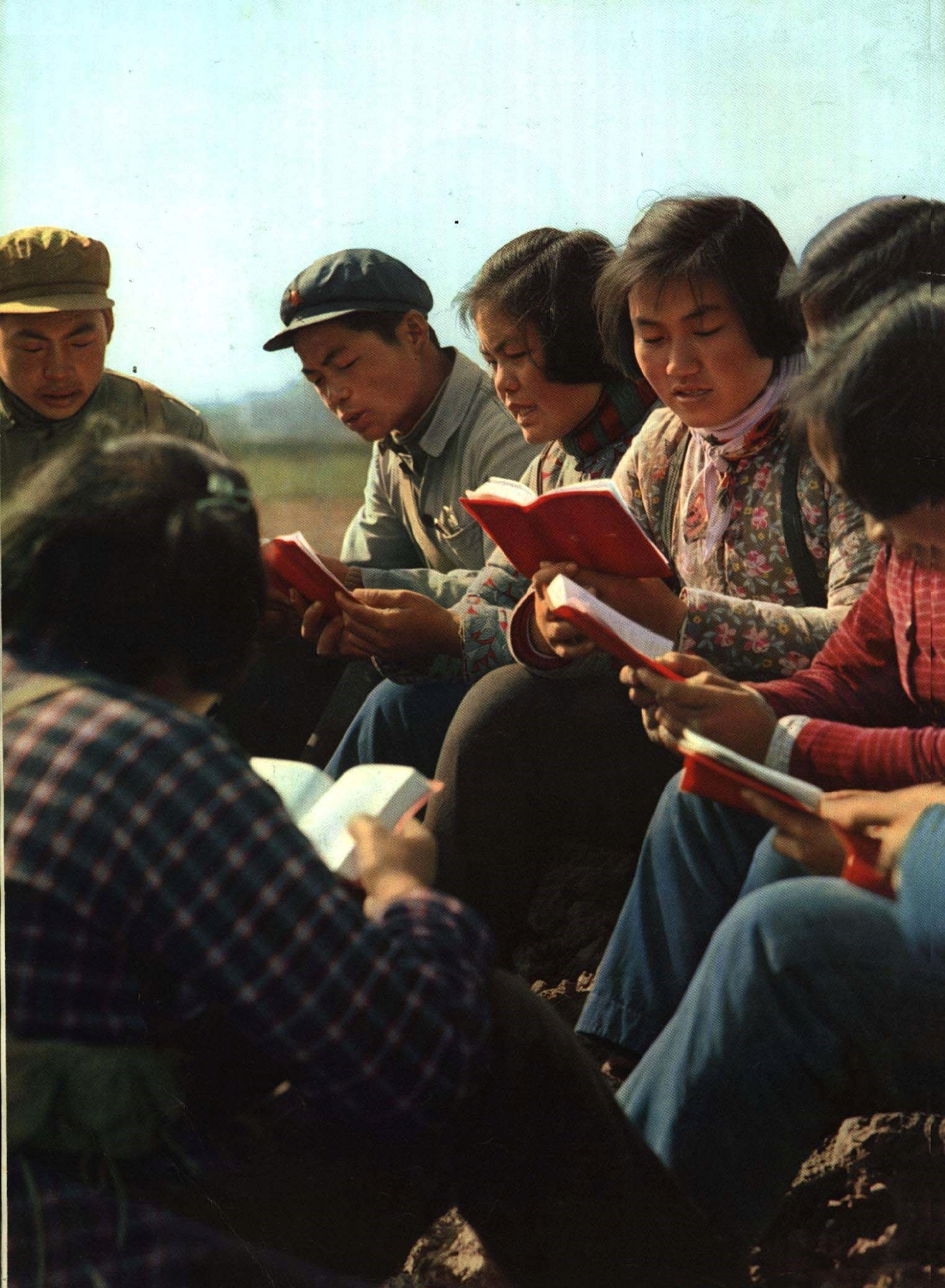
During the Cultural Revolution, the Little Red Book recording quotations of Chairman Mao Zedong was widely popular, with Mao Zedong's cult of personality reaching its peak. At the time, China's Constitution and rule of law were largely overlooked.

The first Constitution of the People's Republic of China, commonly known as the "1954 Constitution", came into effect in 1954. However, in 1958, Mao Zedong publicly advocated the "rule of man" over the "rule of law", saying:

We can't rule the majority of people by relying on law. The majority of people [can be ruled only] by relying on the cultivation of [good] habits. The army's reliance on rule by law didn't work; what's actually worked has been the 1,400-man conference. Who could remember so many clauses of a civil code or criminal law? I participated in the formulation of the Constitution, even I can't remember [it].

During the Cultural Revolution, China's Constitution was revised in 1975 and the second Constitution, commonly known as the "1975 Constitution", absorbed Maoism and vocabulary such as the "absolute leadership of CCP (in China)" into its main content. The Constitution also incorporated manifest descriptions of the CCP organization, abolishing top government positions including the President and the Vice President of China.

Soon after the Cultural Revolution ended in 1976, following the guidelines of Hua Guofeng's "Two Whatevers", a third Constitution of China (known as the "1978 Constitution") was published in 1978. Although some of the expressions associated with the Cultural Revolution were deleted from the 1978 Constitution, most of the content from the 1975 Constitution remained in the new Constitution, including recognition of the "achievement" of the Cultural Revolution and manifest statements like the "leadership of CCP" in China.

During the Boluan Fanzheng period, however, Deng Xiaoping made an important speech titled On the Reform of the System of Party and State Leadership (党和国家领导制度改革) on August 18, 1980, proposing to the National People's Congress that China needed political reforms and a systematic revision of its Constitution. Deng pointed out that the new Constitution must be able to protect the civil rights of Chinese nationals and must demonstrate the principle of separation of powers; he also described the idea of "collective leadership", advocating "one man, one vote" among senior leaders to avoid the dictatorship of the General Secretary of CCP. In December 1982, the fourth Constitution of China (commonly known as the "1982 Constitution"), was passed by the 5th National People's Congress, embodying Chinese-style constitutionalism, and much of its content remains effective as of today. Compared to previous versions, some of the notable changes in the 1982 Constitution include:

- Cultural Revolution vocabulary such as "continuous revolution under the dictatorship of the proletariat" was deleted;
- the descriptions of the organization of Chinese Communist Party was excluded;
- the statement of "the country is led by the Chinese Communist Party" was deleted;
- the statement of "all state organs, the armed forces, all political parties and public organizations and all enterprises and undertakings must abide by the Constitution and the law" was added;
- the positions of President of China and Vice President of China were re-established, with a two-consecutive-term limit and five years for each term.

=== Punishments ===
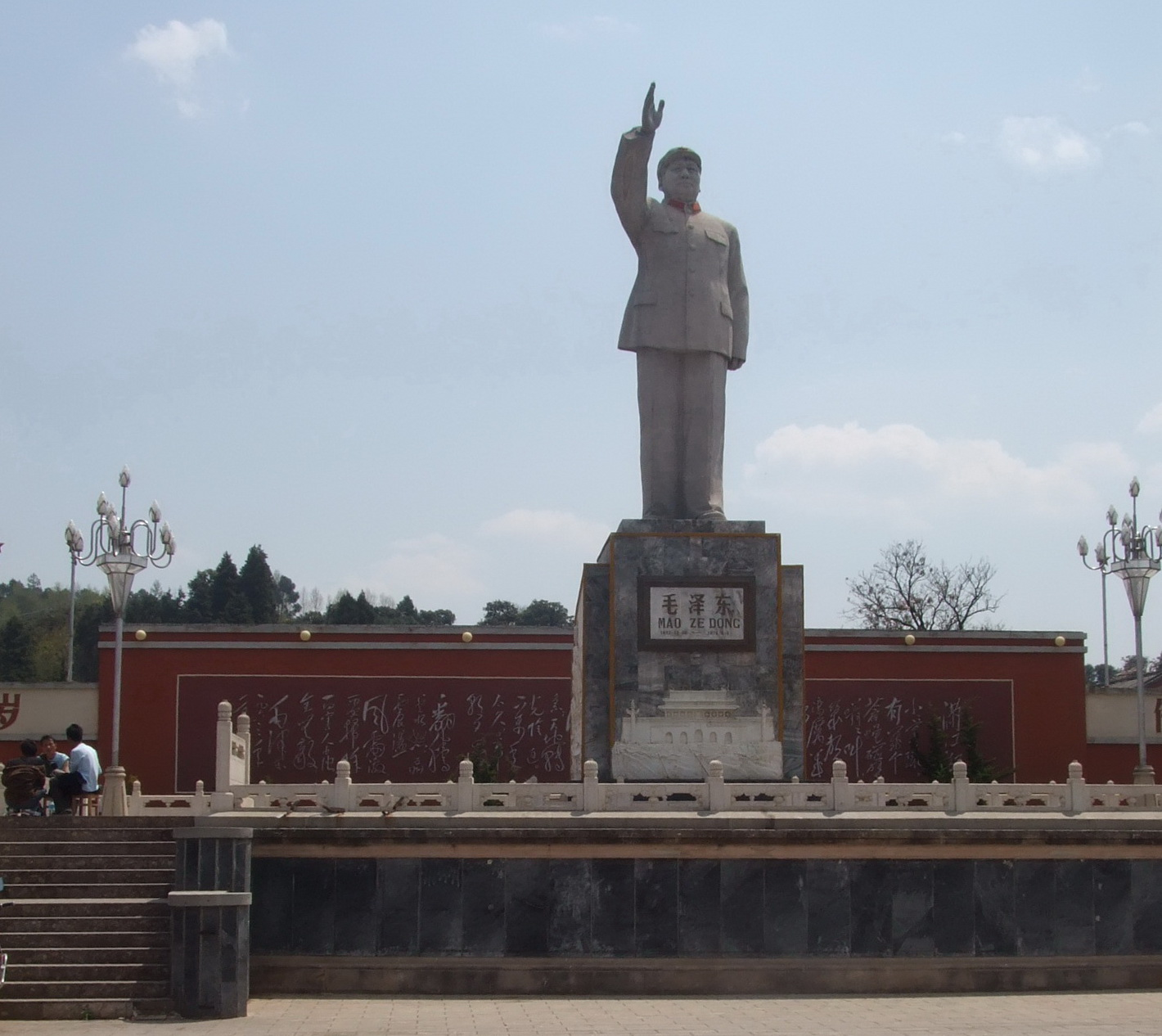
A number of statues of Mao Zedong established during the Cultural Revolution can still be seen in many areas of mainland China today. The image shows one such statue in Yunnan Province, where tens of thousands of people were killed due to massacres in the Cultural Revolution.

Massacres took place across mainland China during the Cultural Revolution. However, in the subsequent Boluan Fanzheng period, many of the leaders and perpetrators of these massacres either received relatively minor punishment (such as getting expelled from the Chinese Communist Party) or received no punishment at all, sparking public outrage. Tens of thousands of people travelled to Beijing in person, petitioning for justice from top officials in the country.

- In Guangxi Massacre, 100,000-150,000 people were killed according to official investigations in the 1980s, and massive cannibalism occurred even though no famine existed. Most people who took part in the massacre and/or cannibalism received no punishment at all or relatively minor punishments afterwards——in Wuxuan County, where at least 38 people were eaten, fifteen participants were prosecuted, receiving up to 14 years in prison.
- In Inner Mongolia Incident, 20,000-100,000 people were killed according to various records and estimates, but Teng Haiqing, the leader who was in charge of this massive purge, did not receive any legal trial or punishment because he was considered by the CCP to have made achievements in past wars.
- In Daoxian Massacre of Hunan Province, a record of 9,093 people were killed. However, only a small number of perpetrators were ever punished, and none of them were sentenced to death. Several leaders of the massacre were either expelled from the CCP or sentenced to jail with various terms of imprisonment; in Dao County, the epicenter of the massacre, only 11 people were ever prosecuted, receiving up to 10 years in prison.

== Academics and education ==
=== Scientists and intellectuals ===
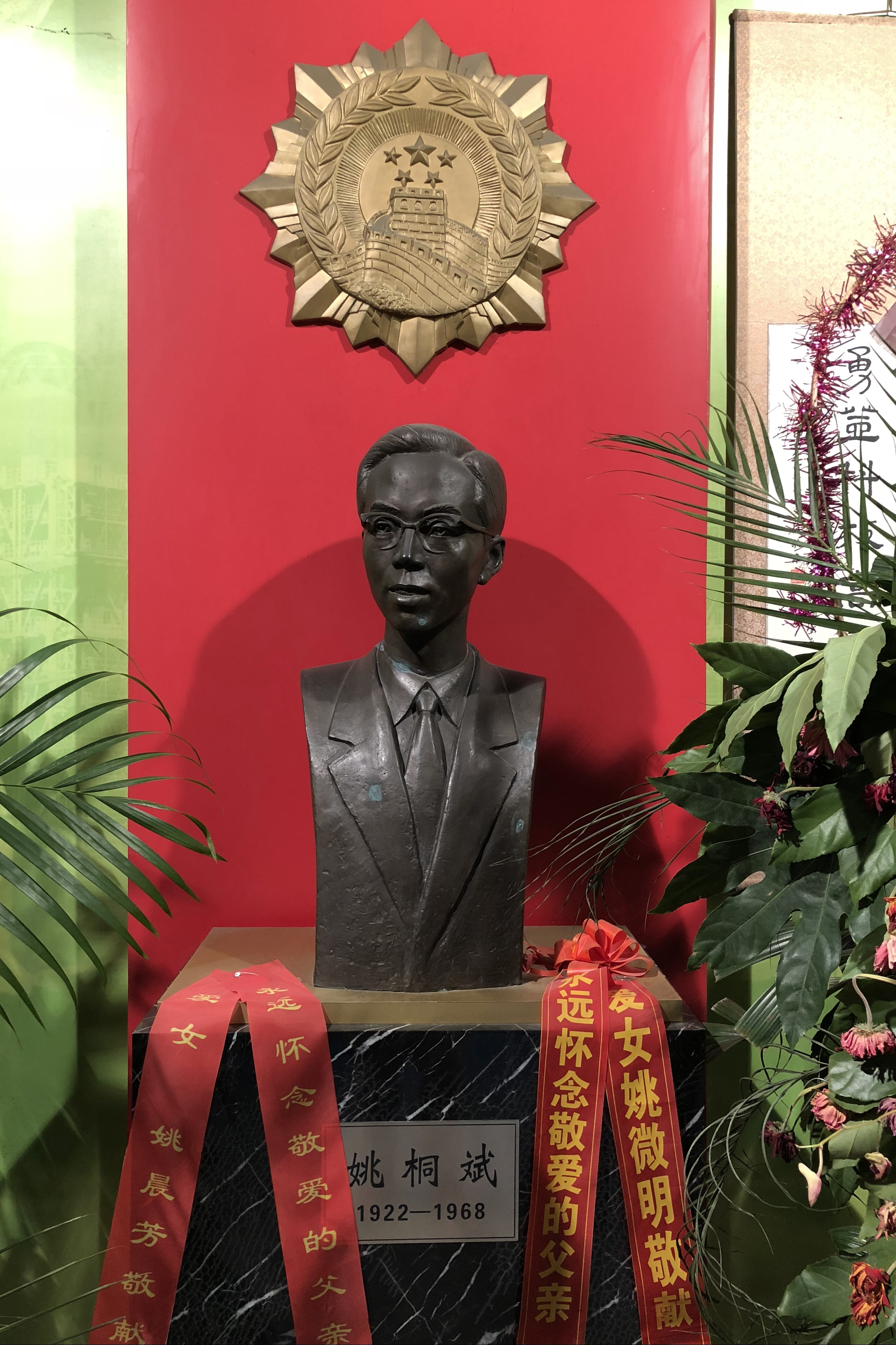
Yao Tongbin, a prominent Chinese missile scientist who was beaten to death during the Cultural Revolution, was recognized as a "martyr (烈士)" in the Boluan Fanzheng period.

During the Cultural Revolution, academics and intellectuals were regarded as the "Stinking Old Ninth" and were widely persecuted. Notable academics, scientists and educators who died due to the Cultural Revolution included Xiong Qinglai, Jian Bozan, Lao She, Tian Han, Fu Lei, Wu Han, Rao Yutai, Wu Dingliang, Yao Tongbin and Zhao Jiuzhang. As of 1968, among the 171 senior members at the headquarters of Chinese Academy of Sciences in Beijing, 131 were persecuted, and among all the members of the academy nationwide, 229 were persecuted to death. As of September 1971, more than 4,000 staff members of China's nuclear center in Qinghai were persecuted: among them, 40 committed suicides, five were executed, and 310 were permanently disabled.

During the Boluan Fanzheng period, Deng Xiaoping himself was in charge of the rehabilitation of scientists and intellectuals who were persecuted during the Cultural Revolution. In March 1978, Deng emphasized at the National Science Conference that intellectuals were part of the working class and that the core of modernization was the modernization of science and technology. Later, he also emphasized that knowledge and talented people must be respected, whereas the wrong thought such as disrespecting intellectuals must be opposed. One of Deng's notable statements was that "science and technology are primary productive forces".

Since the Boluan Fanzheng period, various new genres of literature have emerged, including the "scar literature", the "contemplative literature (反思文学)" and the "literature of reforms (改革文学)".

=== Education system ===
China's education system came to a virtual halt during the Cultural Revolution. In the early months of the Cultural Revolution, schools and universities were closed. Primary and middle schools later gradually reopened, but all colleges and universities were closed until 1970, and most universities did not reopen until 1972. The university entrance exams were cancelled after 1966, to be replaced later by a system whereby students were recommended by factories, villages and military units. Values taught in traditional education were abandoned. In 1968, the Communist Party instituted the Down to the Countryside Movement, in which "Educated Youths" (zhishi qingnian or simply zhiqing) in urban areas were sent to live and work in agrarian areas to be re-educated by the peasantry and to better understand the role of manual agrarian labor in Chinese society.

In 1977, upon the suggestion of Zha Quanxing and Wen Yuankai, Deng Xiaoping restored the National College Entrance Examination (Gaokao) after its ten-year halt during the Cultural Revolution, thus re-establishing the higher education system in China and changing the life of tens of millions. Deng viewed science and education as the fundamentals of China's Four Modernizations. A compulsory education system was proposed during the Boluan Fanzheng period and, with the support of Deng and others, the compulsory education was written into the "1982 Constitution" while China's nine-year compulsory education was eventually established in 1986 under law (Law on Nine-Year Compulsory Education). In 1985, upon the recommendation of Zhao Ziyang, then Premier of China, the National People's Congress designated "September 10" as the annual National Teacher's Day.

In addition, renowned Chinese American mathematician Shiing-Shen Chern once proposed to Deng to raise the basic salary of professors in mainland China, increasing their monthly payments by 100 Yuan, and the proposal was soon approved by Deng.

== Legacy ==
During the Boluan Fanzheng period as well as the early phase of the reform and opening up period, Deng Xiaoping on one hand stressed the importance of "emancipating the mind", while on the other hand repeatedly warning against the so-called "Bourgeois liberalization". In addition, notable people like Zhang Bojun and Luo Longji who were persecuted during the Anti-Rightist Campaign were among the small number of exceptions who did not receive rehabilitation, and Deng played an important role in carrying out that campaign in the 1950s.

In 1983, the Anti-Spiritual Pollution Campaign was launched, followed by the Anti-Bourgeois Liberalization Campaign which was launched in late 1986. The two campaigns were initiated by left-wing conservative politicians and received some support from Deng, but they were both called off eventually thanks to the persuasion and interventions from Hu Yaobang and Zhao Ziyang, the leading reformists besides Deng within the Chinese Communist Party (CCP).

It's been argued that the CCP Central Committee did not fully clear the "elements" associated with the Cultural Revolution inside the Chinese society and banned comprehensive reflections and reviews on this period of history within China. According to researchers and observers, the main reason why CCP took such actions is that having a comprehensive review on the Cultural Revolution within China would fundamentally threaten the legitimacy of CCP as China's only ruling party. Others, at the same time, have also pointed out that even though Deng and other senior CCP officials admitted that the Party had made numerous mistakes in the past, yet they were still trying to preserve CCP's one-party rule in China.

=== Cultural Revolution museums ===
In the 1980s, notable Chinese scholars including Ba Jin called on the Chinese society to establish "Cultural Revolution Museums" so that future generations may learn from the history and prevent Cultural Revolution from happening again. The proposal received support from many Chinese citizens, however there was no official response from the Chinese Communist Party. On the other hand, Ba Jin was subsequently criticized and attacked during the Anti-Spiritual Pollution Campaign as well as the Anti-Bourgeois Liberalization Campaign launched in the 1980s.

In 1996, the local government of Shantou in Guangdong Province decided to establish the first Cultural Revolution museum in mainland China—the Shantou Cultural Revolution Museum, which was eventually opened to the public in 2005. However, the museum was forced to shut down in 2016.

== See also ==
- Socialism with Chinese characteristics
- Deng Xiaoping Theory
- Beijing Spring
- 1983 "Strike Hard" Anti-crime Campaign
- 1986 Chinese student demonstrations
- Song: Story of Spring
- TV series: Deng Xiaoping at History's Crossroads
- De-Stalinization
