= Shantou Cultural Revolution Museum =

Museum in Shantou, China

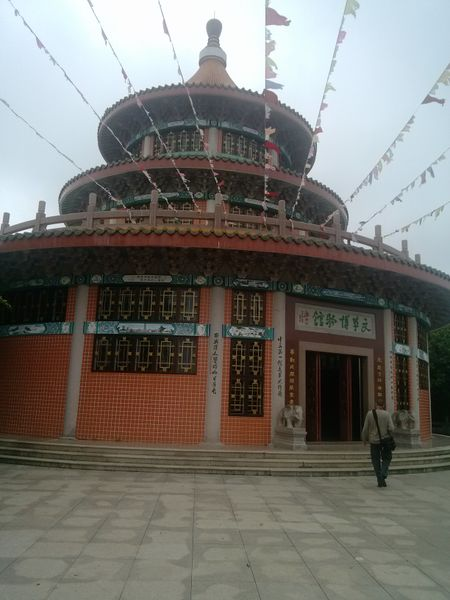
- Shantou Cultural Revolution Museum
- Established: January 2005
- Dissolved: April 2016
- Location: Tashan Scenic Area, Shantou
- Type: Historical museum
- Founder: Peng Qi'an

Shantou Cultural Revolution Museum
- Traditional Chinese: 汕頭文革博物館
- Simplified Chinese: 汕头文革博物馆
Transcriptions
Standard Mandarin
- Hanyu Pinyin: Shàntóu wéngé bówùguǎn

The Shantou Cultural Revolution Museum was the only memorial museum dedicated to the Cultural Revolution in Mainland China, located in the Tashan Scenic Area, Chenghai District, Shantou City. It was established by Peng Qi'an, the former vice mayor of Shantou, and opened in January 2005. It was dissolved in April 2016.

== Inception and construction ==
In 1996, Peng Qi'an, a former vice mayor of Shantou, came across dozens of graves scattered around the slopes of Tashan Scenic Area. Having learned that these victims had died in 1967 and 1968 during the Cultural Revolution, he started his efforts to turn the park into a memorial site. He began by contacting other survivors of the Cultural Revolution, many of whom were government officials. Peng named the endeavor the Pagoda Park (Chinese: 塔园) project, avoiding any reference to the Cultural Revolution due to the sensitivity and taboo of the topic. After retiring from public office in 1999, Peng intensified his efforts towards the project. Including the main museum, altogether 25 scenic spots were built on Pagoda Park, one at a time whenever enough money had been raised by Peng.

During the Cultural Revolution, Peng had been subjected to at least 30 criticism sessions; in 1967 he had been on a list of five people for whom execution was recommended to higher authorities, due to his alleged association with a "counter-revolutionary" group named after two local leaders who had lost power.

The district government originally opposed the construction of the museum. Friends and other officials expressed their worries to Peng that he might run afoul of authorities, but he remained unfazed. Business tycoon and philanthropist Li Ka-Shing donated 300,000 Renminbi towards the construction, and inscriptions. The total funds raised by Peng amounted to over CN¥ 10 million. The donors included many friends of Peng who were fellow survivors.

In 2003, Peng received from a friend a copy of a book by Yang Kelin (杨克林) entitled Cultural Revolution Museum. The descriptions in the book served as a blueprint for the main museum building.

On January 1, 2005, the museum was officially opened as the first museum in China dedicated to the Cultural Revolution. Vice president of the Federation of Literary and Art Circles Feng Jicai attended. Chinese state media kept silent about the opening ceremony.

The museum is regarded as the brainchild of reformist Guangdong party secretary Ren Zhongyi, with distinguished author Ba Jin also having been a major influence. A memorial space at the park entrance contained a depiction of Ba Jin and described him as an "advocate" of the museum.

== Museum design and displays ==
The museum covered an area of approximately 570 square metres (6,100 sq ft), with its main building, a three-storey pavilion, designed to resemble the Temple of Heaven in Beijing. The main building housed hundreds of photos and drawings depicting events in the Cultural Revolution. It prominently featured Chairman Mao Zedong, who initiated the Cultural Revolution, and his last wife, Gang of Four member Jiang Qing. Hundreds of gray granite slabs around the circumference of its inner walls had etchings of paintings from the two volumes of the book by Yang Kelin. Some paraphernalia such as little red books and Mao busts and badges were removed after some artifacts had disappeared. A library inside the museum held nearly 300 books as of 2005.

A large granite slab at the entrance of the museum bore an inscription of the official verdict of the Central Committee of the Chinese Communist Party (CCP) on the Cultural Revolution from 1981, which pronounced it to have been a "serious disaster to the party, the country and the people". Outside the museum was a large statue of Deng Xiaoping, a victim of the Cultural Revolution who later rose to condemn its excesses as Mao's successor. A quote of provincial party secretary Ren which warned against allowing the "tragedy of the Cultural Revolution" to be repeated was engraved at a wall near the park entrance. Quotations by Ren had also been engraved elsewhere in Tashan Scenic Area. The museum also had statues of Liu Shaoqi, a former president who was one of the first victims of the Cultural Revolution, and of Marshal Ye Jianying, who spearheaded the action taken against the Gang of Four.

Surrounding the main building were small monuments, commemorative steles and inscribed tombstones. These focused on the local victims of the Cultural Revolution, with one mural listing the names of more than 4,000 dead from the neighbouring villages. Another mural listed 304 types of counter-revolutionary crimes that a person could be charged with, among them being a "counter-revolutionary revisionist" or "bourgeois element". Coverage of the perpetrators was scant. The design of the monuments largely drew on premodern China.

A graveyard adjacent to the museum grounds contains the remains of over 70 victims of the Cultural Revolution, including those who were beaten to death by rebel groups; one of the graves contains the remains of 28 victims who could not be individually identified.

== Commemoration of victims ==
Peng said he and others wanted to leave a place of caution for the Chinese nation, and that he did not intend to undermine the credibility of the CCP through the museum. He also said that it was possible to understand the intentions of the museum by reading "between the lines".

From 2006 to 2013, Peng and a group of volunteers held an annual memorial ceremony at the museum in remembrance of the victims of the Cultural Revolution. The date of the ceremony was August 8, commemorating the 1966 decision of the Central Committee of the Chinese Communist Party to launch the Cultural Revolution, which Peng in 2012 called a "disastrous day for China". The seventh annual ceremony in 2012 was attended by some 450 people.

== Restrictions and closure ==
Due to the museum addressing a sensitive period of Chinese history, it advertised itself discreetly on the internet, other means not being allowed as of 2010. In 2013, the bank account of the museum for receiving donations was closed. In 2015, Peng handed over the museum to the local government, citing his old age. Previous attempts by Peng to find a successor, who he had wanted to be prestigious and influential, had failed; several retired municipal officials who he had contacted had refused due to the sensitive nature of the position. The last director of the museum was Du Xuping. In late April 2016 the museum was closed down, fenced off and all inscriptions, monuments, and more were covered up. The timing of the decision was seen by observers as being related to the impending 50-year anniversary of the May 16 Notification, considered widely to be the starting point of the Cultural Revolution.

== See also ==
- Boluan Fanzheng
- History of the People's Republic of China
