= Seek truth from facts =

Chinese slogan

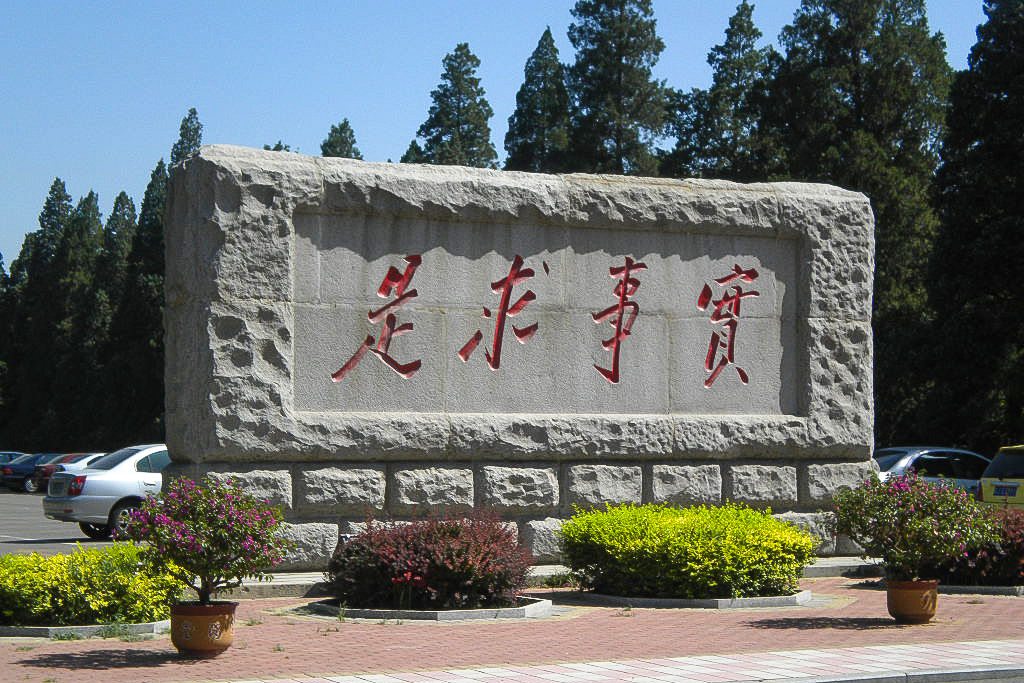
- A stele of the expression in Beijing
- Traditional Chinese: 實事求是
- Simplified Chinese: 实事求是
Transcriptions
Standard Mandarin
- Hanyu Pinyin: Shí shì qiú shì
Yue: Cantonese
- Yale Romanization: Saht sih kàuh sih
- Jyutping: Sat6 si6 kau4 si6

"Seek truth from facts" is a historically established idiomatic expression (chengyu) in the Chinese language that first appeared in the Book of Han. Originally, it described an attitude toward study and research. Popularized by Chinese leader Mao Zedong, it has become a major slogan of the Chinese Communist Party (CCP) and the inspiration for its principal theoretical journal, Qiushi.

== Use in a political context ==
The slogan became a key slogan in Chinese Marxism and was first used by Mao Zedong in 1936. Mao had probably remembered it as being the inscription on his alma mater, Hunan's First Teachers Training School. Mao's usage of the slogan built on his themes in On Practice, which argues that people must apply their knowledge to practice in reality in order to test its truthfulness.

Beginning in 1978, it was further promoted by Deng Xiaoping as a central ideology of socialism with Chinese characteristics, and applied to economic and political reforms thereafter. In Deng described the principle of seeking truth from facts as the core of Mao Zedong Thought.

Seek truth from facts

河間獻王德以孝景前二年立，修學好古，實事求是。從民得善書，必為好寫與之，留其真，加金帛賜以招之。

The Prince Xian of Hejian, Liu De, was made a prince in the second year of Emperor Jing the Filial; he enjoyed studying classics from earlier eras, and sought truth from facts. When he obtained a valuable book from the people, he always made a copy by transcribing it and returned the copy to them, keeping the original himself, and provided gold and silk to keep those guests coming.

— 《漢書 ·河間獻王德傳》
The Biography of the Prince Xian of Hejian, Liu De (Book of Han)

== In contemporary Chinese politics ==
To "seek truth from facts" means that communists should test theory against reality rather than adhere dogmatically to theory. The slogan implies respect for facts and using facts to inform theory and policy.

On 11 May 1978 journalist Hu Fuming published an article in state run newspaper Guangming Daily entitled "Practice is the Sole Criterion for Testing Truth", directly contradicting then CCP general secretary Hua Guofeng's line of the Two Whatevers (Chinese: 两个凡是; pinyin: Liǎng gè fánshì) policy and thereby Mao Zedong's policy of class struggle; in favour of economic reform championed by Deng Xiaoping. The title of the article is inspired by the ancient saying and is widely seen as a seminal document in the contemporary Chinese political landscape and marks the turning point to the era of the reform and opening up in 20th century China. In June 1978, Deng endorsed the perspective of the editorial at an All-Army Political Work Conference. Deng stated that Marxist theory should not be "lifeless dogma" and cited Mao's method of seeking truth from facts, contrasting the "Two Whatevers" with the view that "only through practice can the correctness of one's ideas be proved, and there is no other way of testing truth."

Practice is not only the criterion for testing truth, but the only criterion. Chairman Mao said: "There is only one truth, and whoever discovers the truth does not rely on subjective exaggeration, but on objective practice." Only the revolutionary practice of millions of people is the yardstick for testing the truth. "The criterion of truth can only be the practice of society. It is said here: "only" and "is", that is, there is only one standard, and there is no second.

This is because the truth mentioned by dialectical materialism is an objective truth, and it is the correct reflection of human thought on the objective world and its laws. Therefore, as the criterion for testing the truth, we cannot look for it in the subjective realm, nor can we look for it in the realm of theory, and ideas, theories, and ourselves cannot be the criteria for testing whether they conform to objective reality, just as in law the plaintiff is true or not, he cannot be based on his own lawsuit.

As a criterion for testing truth, it must have the characteristic of connecting the human mind with the objective world, otherwise it cannot be tested. Human social practice is an activity to transform the objective world, and it is something that is subjectively seen in the objective. Practice has the property of linking ideas with objective reality. Therefore, it is practice, and only practice, that can accomplish the task of testing the truth. Numerous facts in the history of science speak volumes about this problem.

— Hu Fuming, "Practice is the Sole Criterion for Testing the Truth", Guangming Daily May 11, 1978,

Qiushi - "Seeking Truth" (Chinese: 求是; pinyin: Qiúshì) is also the official name of the journal of political theory of the Chinese Communist Party, derived from the above slogan.

== See also ==
- 1978 Truth Criterion Controversy
