= Shaoyang County Massacre =

1968 political massacre in China

- Part of Cultural Revolution in China
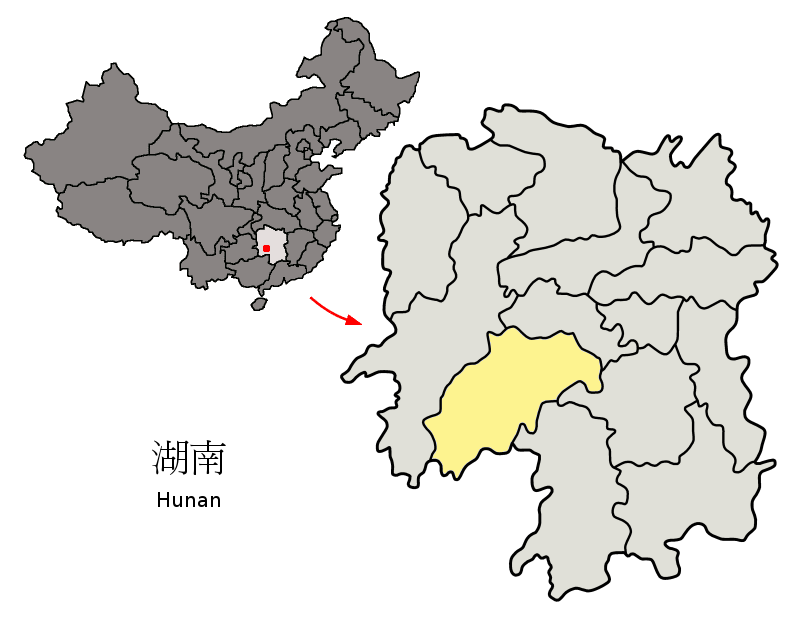
- Shaoyang in China and Hunan.
- Native name: 邵阳县大屠杀
- Location: Shaoyang County, China
- Date: July – September 1968
- Target: "Five Black Categories" (Landlords, wealthy peasants, counter-revolutionaries, bad influencers, and right-wingers)
- Attack type: Politicide, politically motivated violence, political persecution, class warfare
- Deaths: 1,690 (killed including those who committed suicide)
- Victims: 7,781 (imprisoned), 991 (killed), 699 (forced suicide)
- Perpetrators: Chinese Communist Party, Mao Zedong
- Motive: Cultural Revolution instigated by Mao Zedong, elimination of political enemies, "class enemies", resentment of wealthier members of society instigated by the local party committees.

The Shaoyang County Massacre (simplified Chinese: 邵阳县大屠杀; traditional Chinese: 邵陽縣大屠殺; pinyin: Shàoyáng xiàn dà túshā), also known as the "Black Killing Wind" Incident (simplified Chinese: 黑杀风事件; traditional Chinese: 黑殺風事件; pinyin: Hēi shā fēng shìjiàn), was a massacre in Hunan's Shaoyang County during the Chinese Cultural Revolution. According to the official statistics in 1974, from July to September 1968, a total of 11,177 people were arrested with 7,781 imprisoned and 113 permanently disabled, while the death toll of the massacre was 991, including 699 who were forced to commit suicide. However, some researchers argue that thousands of people died in the massacre.

During the Cultural Revolution, peasants in Dao County of Hunan Province coined the phrase "Black Killing Team (黑杀队)", meaning that 21 types of people including members of the Five Black Categories as well as their relatives were organised to form such teams to systematically kill peasants and local officials. In 1967, the Daoxian Massacre broke out, targeting members of the Black Killing Team and causing the deaths of over 9,000 people.

The Daoxian Massacre in 1967 made a direct impact on the "Black Killing Wind (黑杀风)" in Shaoyang. Methods of torture and slaughter in the Shaoyang massacre included live burial, stoning, drowning, suffocating, boiling, burning, and dismembering, and many female victims were tortured and sexually abused before death. A large number of corpses were floating down the Zi River and some of the dead bodies even blocked the water pumps inside local water purification plants, creating panic among local citizens who stopped using tap water for approximately half a month. The massacre eventually ended due to the multiple interventions from the 47th Group of the People's Liberation Army.

== Historical background ==
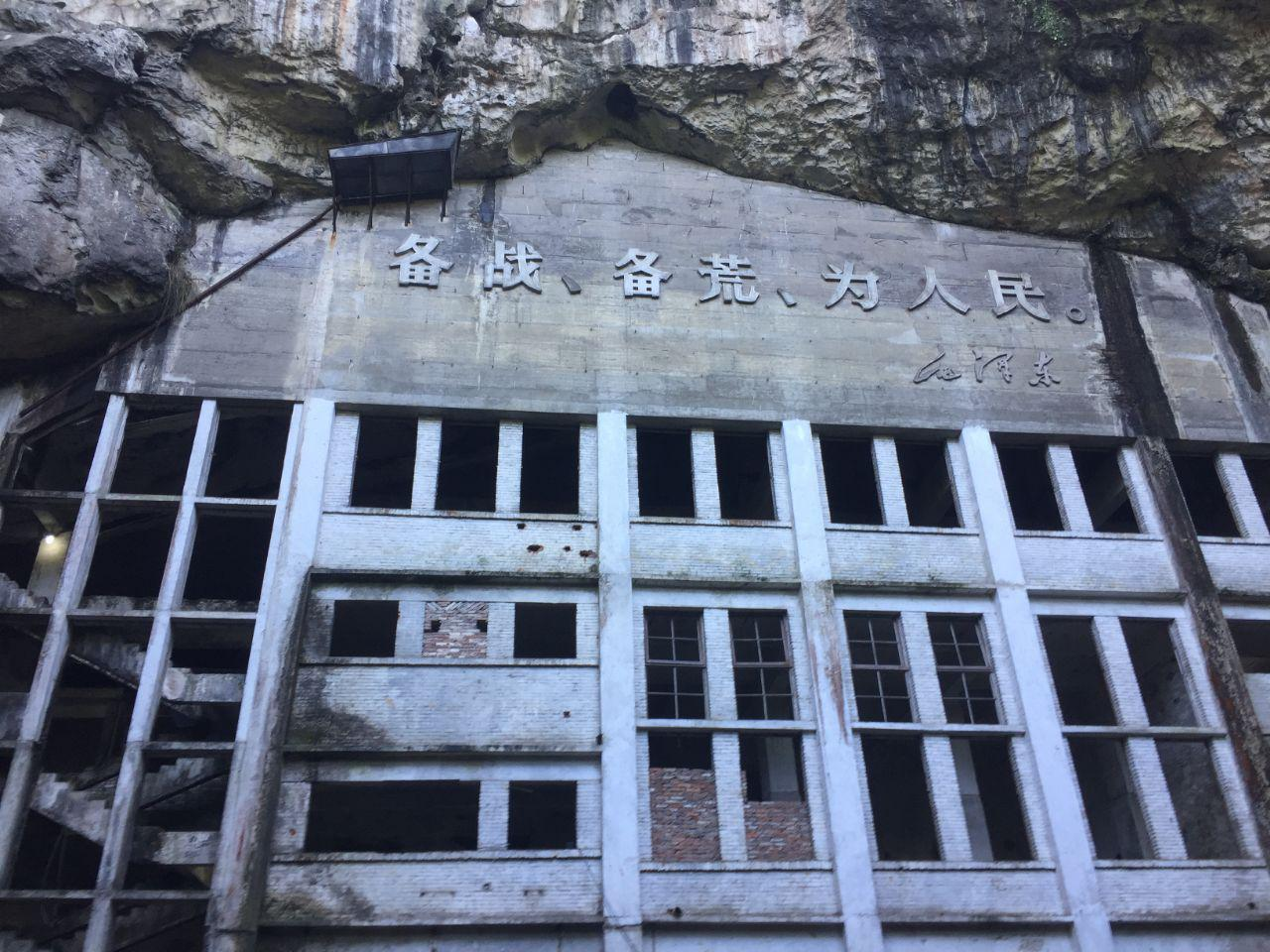
An armory built in Shaoyang during the Cultural Revolution (1966).

In May 1966, Mao Zedong launched the Cultural Revolution in mainland China. In 1967, peasants in Dao County of Hunan Province coined the phrase "Black Killing Team (黑杀队)", which consisted of 21 types of people such as the members of the Five Black Categories as well as their relatives. The team was said to have the intention of retaliating against the peasants and local officials. As a result, from August to October 1967, the Daoxian Massacre broke out, targeting members of the Black Killing team. A total of 7,696 people were killed and another 1,397 were forced to commit suicide.

The Daoxian Massacre had a direct impact on the massacre in Shaoyang County, also in Hunan Province.

== The Black Killing Wind ==
=== The massacre ===
In July 1968, the movement to capture and kill members of the "Black Killing Team" began in Shaoyang. Such movement turned into a violent massacre on August 4, when the entire family of Deng Baomin (邓保民), the son of a landlord, was wiped out. The massacre was carried out by peasants in Shaoyang county and was led by local militia and the production brigade.

Perpetrators of the massacre not only refused to cover the dead bodies of many victims, but forbade relatives of the victims from collecting the bodies. With the corpses piling up rapidly, however, many of the dead bodies were eventually disposed into the Zi River and floated down the river. Some of the bodies even blocked the water pumps inside local water purification plants and, as a result, local citizens refused to drink tap water for around half a month. When the authorities in Shaoyang City ordered the local public security bureau to bury the corpses floating in the river, the latter asked for volunteers (with a 10-yuan reward) from the rural areas of Shaoyang to remove the floating bodies from the river and bury them.

Beginning in late August 1968, the 47th Group of the People's Liberation Army took multiple interventions which gradually brought an end to the massacre.

=== Methods of killing ===
In the Shaoyang massacre, killing methods included live burial, stoning, burning, drowning in rivers or water tanks, beating with hoes or rods, dismembering with bamboo trees, and so on. Many female victims were tortured and sexually abused before being killed, some with nipples or genitals removed or pierced by iron wires.

=== Death toll ===
According to the official statistics in 1974, a total of 11,177 people were arrested during the "Black Killing Wind" with 7,781 imprisoned and 113 permanently disabled; the death toll of the massacre was 991, including 699 who were forced to commit suicide. In addition, 702 private jails and 1,587 private handcuffs were created during the massacre.

Some researchers have pointed out that thousands of people were killed in reality. However, the Annals of Shaoyang County (1993 edition) only recognized that 295 people were killed and 277 people were forced to commit suicide during the massacre, leading to a total of 572 victims.

== Aftermath ==
After the Cultural Revolution, victims of the massacre were partially rehabilitated during or after the "Boluan Fanzheng" period. In the 1980s, 134 cases of homicides were investigated by local authorities and a number of perpetrators received criminal charges, disciplinary reprimands or were expelled from the Chinese Communist Party (CCP). Families of the victims received a certain amount of financial support and restitution.

== See also ==
- Daoxian Massacre
- Mass killings under communist regimes
- List of massacres in China
- Boluan Fanzheng
