= Daoxian massacre =

Massacre in China during the Cultural Revolution

- Part of Cultural Revolution
- Date: 1967
- Location: Dao County, Hunan
- Caused by: rumor of Kuomintang invasion, condemnation of Five Black Categories
- Result: CCP Central Committee and the Hunan Provincial Revolutionary Committee sent the 47th Field Army to force all local CCP and militia members to stop the killing

Parties
Civilians	Red Guards, militia, local CCP members	CCP Central Committee

Number
local civilian population	14,000	

Casualties and losses
9,093 (4,519 in Dao County alone)		

The Daoxian massacre (simplified Chinese: 道县大屠杀; traditional Chinese: 道縣大屠殺; pinyin: Dào Xiàn Dàtúshā), or Dao County massacre, was a massacre which took place during the Cultural Revolution in Dao County, Hunan as well as ten other nearby counties and cities. From August 13 to October 17, 1967, a total of 7,696 people were killed while 1,397 people were forced to commit suicide. An additional 2,146 people were permanently injured and disabled. Most of the victims were labelled as "class enemies", belonging to the Five Black Categories, while at least 14,000 people participated in the massacre. The Daoxian massacre had a direct impact on the Shaoyang County Massacre in 1968.

After the Cultural Revolution, the Chinese Communist Party (CCP) considered the Daoxian incident as one of the "unjust, false, and erroneous" cases of the Revolution and the victims were rehabilitated, but only a small number of the perpetrators were ever punished during the "Boluan Fanzheng" period. Several leaders of the massacre were either expelled from the CCP or received various terms of imprisonment; in Dao County itself, only 11 people were prosecuted, and were sentenced to 3–10 years in prison, respectively. In total, twelve people were sentenced to life imprisonment, but none received the death penalty. The mild punishments for the perpetrators sparked public outrage in the 1980s.

== Historical background ==
=== Cultural Revolution ===
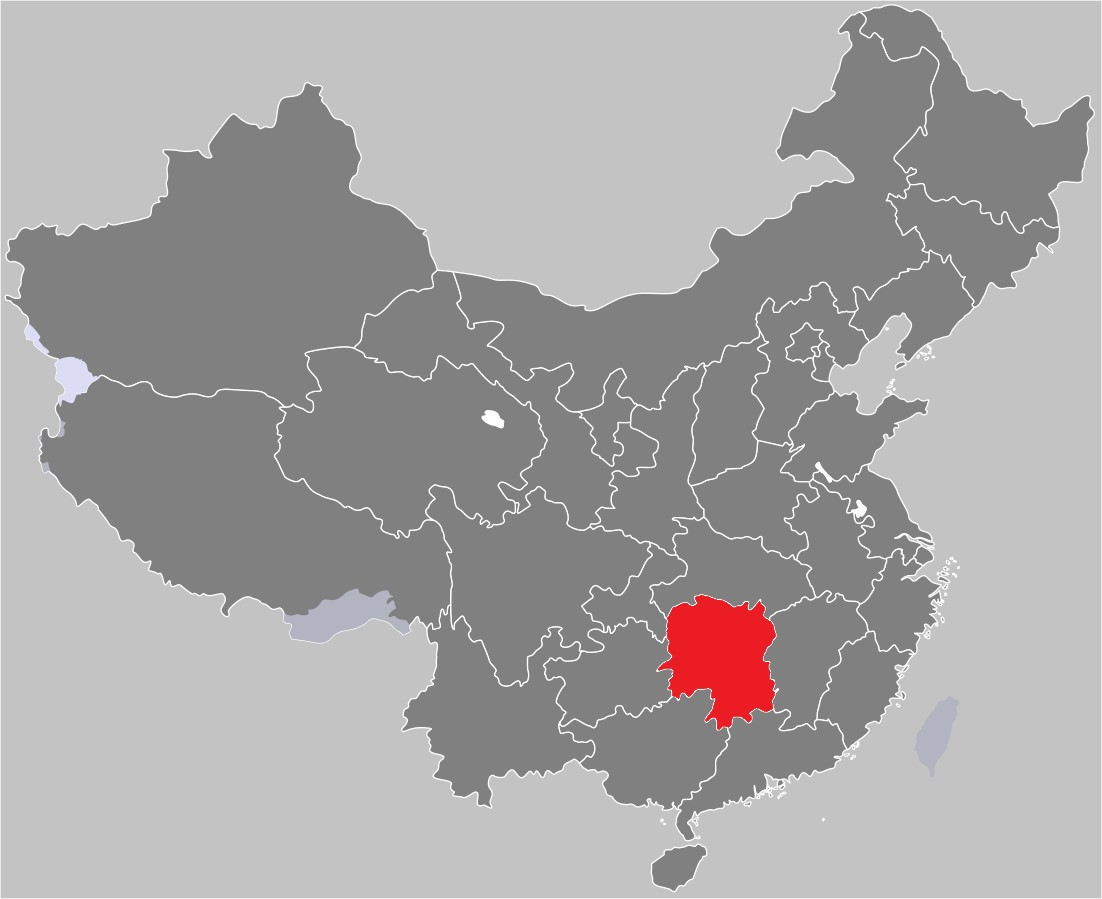
Hunan Province (in red)

During the Cultural Revolution in China which lasted from 1966 to 1976, millions of people deemed "counter-revolutionaries" or who did not side with Mao Zedong were persecuted. Mao endorsed the revolutionary discourse and the attacks on authority figures, who he believed had grown complacent, bureaucratic, and anti-revolutionary. Local Red Guards attacked anyone who they believed lacked revolutionary credentials, and then eventually turned on those who simply failed to wholeheartedly support their efforts and intentions. In August 1966, the Central Committee issued a directive entitled the "Decision of the Central Committee of the Chinese Communist Party Concerning the Great Proletarian Cultural Revolution" (a.k.a. the Sixteen Points) in an effort to define the revolution's goals. Later that month, Mao began to greet huge parades of Red Guards holding aloft his Little Red Book.

The movement grew but also splintered into independent movements and Red Guard factions, each with its own vision of the movement. Despite official directives and encouragement from the Party leadership, local forces were left to act according to their own definitions of the Revolution's goals, and many of them ended up inflicting violence upon their communities and clashing with each other. Nobody wanted to be considered a "reactionary," but in the absence of official guidelines for identifying "true Communists," almost everyone became a target of abuse. People tried to protect themselves and escape persecution by attacking friends and even their own families. The result was a bewildering series of attacks and counterattacks, factional fighting, unpredictable violence, and the breakdown of authority throughout China.

=== The build-up to massacre ===
By the time of the massacre, Dao County had not yet established its own local revolutionary committee to deal with "counter-revolutionaries". Thus, local army officers were the administrators of the county's leading group for "grasping revolution and promoting production".

At two countywide meetings on August 5 and August 11, Liu Shibing, the Political Commissar of the county's militia headquarters, spread a conspiracy rumor: Chiang Kai-shek's Nationalist troops were going to attack mainland China, and the county's class enemies, particularly the Five Black Categories, planned to rise in rebellion in cooperation with Chiang's war plan. In addition, Liu claimed that a number of people under the Five Black Categories in Dao County "had plotted to kill all Communist party members and poor- and lower-middle peasant leaders in the county." Liu Shibing, along with Xiong Binen, Deputy-Secretariat of the Dao County CCP Committee, ordered all levels of militia personnel and security officers to start an urgent preemptive attack against the class enemies. Although they did not specifically state the word "kill", all levels of party leadership understood the meaning of this strong signal. There is no doubt that those government officials at the highest county rank were the decision-makers. They not only manufactured an imminent threat to justify the approaching massacre but instructed their subordinates to execute the killing as well.

== Massacre ==
=== Target population ===
Almost everyone could be a target during the massacre. Victims ranged in age from a ten-day-old infant to a 78-year-old grandfather. Those killed or driven to suicide not only included people deemed "Five Black Categories", but sometimes were killed due to personal resentment or kinship-related disputes. Many Chinese villagers at the time - despite nominally living in a collectivist society - followed traditional Chinese kinship-based networks; some villages were split between two clans of different surnames, who often had antagonistic relations historically. Such old grudges were often settled during the period of unrest following 1967.

=== Organization ===
The district and commune level instigators created their own brutal and lawless way of organizing the massacres in their areas. Prior to the executions they would often hold a short "trial" (lasting only a few minutes) in the lawlessly created "Supreme Court of the Poor and Lower-middle Peasants". The "judges" were unsurprisingly the local leaders who prearranged the killings. If the victims were sentenced to death (and they almost always were amid the corruption and lawlessness), they were trussed up by armed militia and taken to a mass rally for denouncing their "crimes." Then, they were killed in public or by the public. Sometimes the local CCP and militia officials considered that it might be dangerous to take the victims to the public. They would then quietly send a team of armed militia to the victims' homes to carry out the slaughter. The victims would often be informed while away from home that an issue had risen requiring them to return, in order to lure the victims back home where their killers would be waiting.

Those directly involved in the "executions" were rewarded for their work with higher salaries than they earned by their regular employment in the commune or district, an incentive that was a major factor for the high number of people who participated in the killings; a number of local CCP and militia officials personally led the killings. Perhaps unsurprisingly, given the lack of law enforcement, local criminals also joined in the violence. Most of those in the militias were social outcasts and little respected people who sought to earn honor by participating in the killings.

=== Methods of killing ===
Victims were killed in many ways, including shooting, beating, drowning, explosion (with dynamites), decapitation, hanging, and burning.

=== Death toll ===
The episode of mass violence in Daoxian eventually spread to other counties in Hunan province as other groups wanted to cleanse their own areas of "counter-revolutionaries". Eventually, after receiving serious complaints from survivors of the massacre, on August 29 the CCP Central Committee and the Hunan Provincial Revolutionary Committee sent the 47th Field Army to force all local CCP and militia members to stop the killing. However, sporadic killings occurred up until October 17.

- In Dao County alone, 4,519 people were recorded as having been killed (4,193) or driven to suicide (326), and over 14,000 were said to have participated in the killings.
- In all counties and cities involved, 7,696 people were killed and 1,397 people were forced to commit suicide. An additional 2,146 people were permanently injured and disabled.

== Rehabilitation ==
After the Cultural Revolution, the Chinese Communist Party (CCP) considered the Dao County incident as one of the "unjust, false, erroneous" cases of the Revolution. During the "Boluan Fanzheng" period, CCP leaders such as Hu Yaobang and Jiang Hua visited the region from 1980 to 1982, instructing local officials to take this incident seriously and impose harsh punishments on perpetrators.

However, only a small number of the perpetrators were ever punished, and none were sentenced to death. Several leaders of the massacre were either expelled from the CCP or received various terms of imprisonment. In Dao County itself, 43 people who involved in the massacre were punished, with only 11 people being prosecuted, receiving 3–10 years in prison, respectively.

== See also ==
- Shaoyang County Massacre
- List of massacres in China
- Mass killings under communist regimes
