= Ellis Rubinstein =

American journalist

Ellis Rubinstein is an American former science journalist and editor who served as president and CEO of the New York Academy of Sciences. He was also the co-chair of the Global Science and Innovation Advisory Council.
