= Chenghai, Shantou =

Chenghai 澄海区
- District
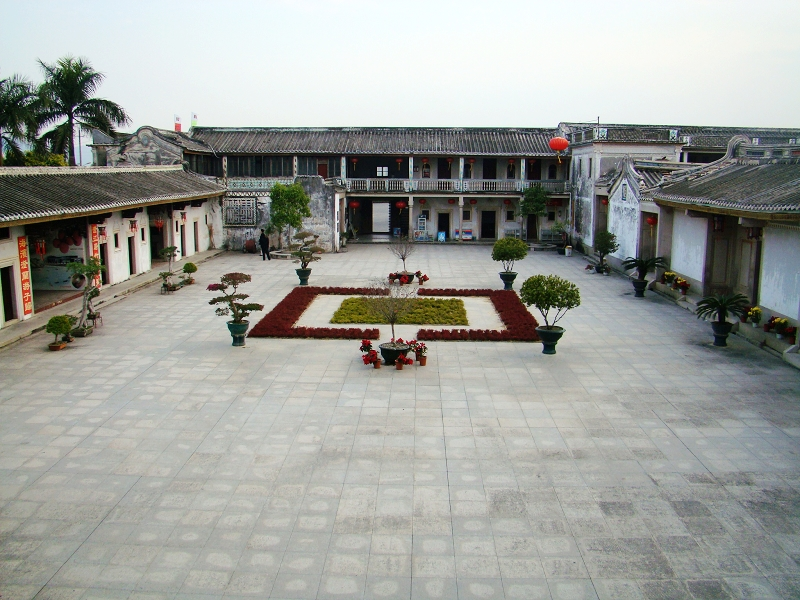
- Former residence of Chen Cihong

- Location of Chenghai in Shantou

- Location in Guangdong
- Coordinates: 23°28′0″N 116°46′0″E
- Country: People's Republic of China
- Province: Guangdong
- Prefecture-level city: Shantou

Area
  - Total: 345.23 km^{2} (133.29 sq mi)

Population (2020 census)
  - Total: 874,444
  - Density: 2,532.9/km^{2} (6,560.3/sq mi)
- Time zone: UTC+8 (China Standard)
- Language: Teochew

Chenghai, Shantou
- Simplified Chinese: 澄海
- Traditional Chinese: 澄海
- Postal: Tenghai
- Literal meaning: clear [the Wokou of] the sea
Transcriptions
Standard Mandarin
- Hanyu Pinyin: Chénghǎi
- IPA: [ʈʂʰə̌ŋ.xàɪ]
Southern Min
- Teochew Peng'im: têng^{5}hai^{2}

Chenghai (Chinese: 澄海; pinyin: Chénghǎi; postal: Tenghai; Pe̍h-ūe-jī: Thêng Hái; Peng'im: Têng Hai) is a district of the city of Shantou, Guangdong Province, China.

Located at the Han River Delta in the southeast part of Guangdong Province, Chenghai spans from 116°41' to 116°54' E longitude and 23°23' to 23°38' N latitude. Chenghai is an important transportation hub of the area around east Guangdong, the southeast part of Fujian and south Jiangxi Province, which is known as the "Gateway of East Guangdong". The total area of this district is 345.23 square kilometres.

== History ==
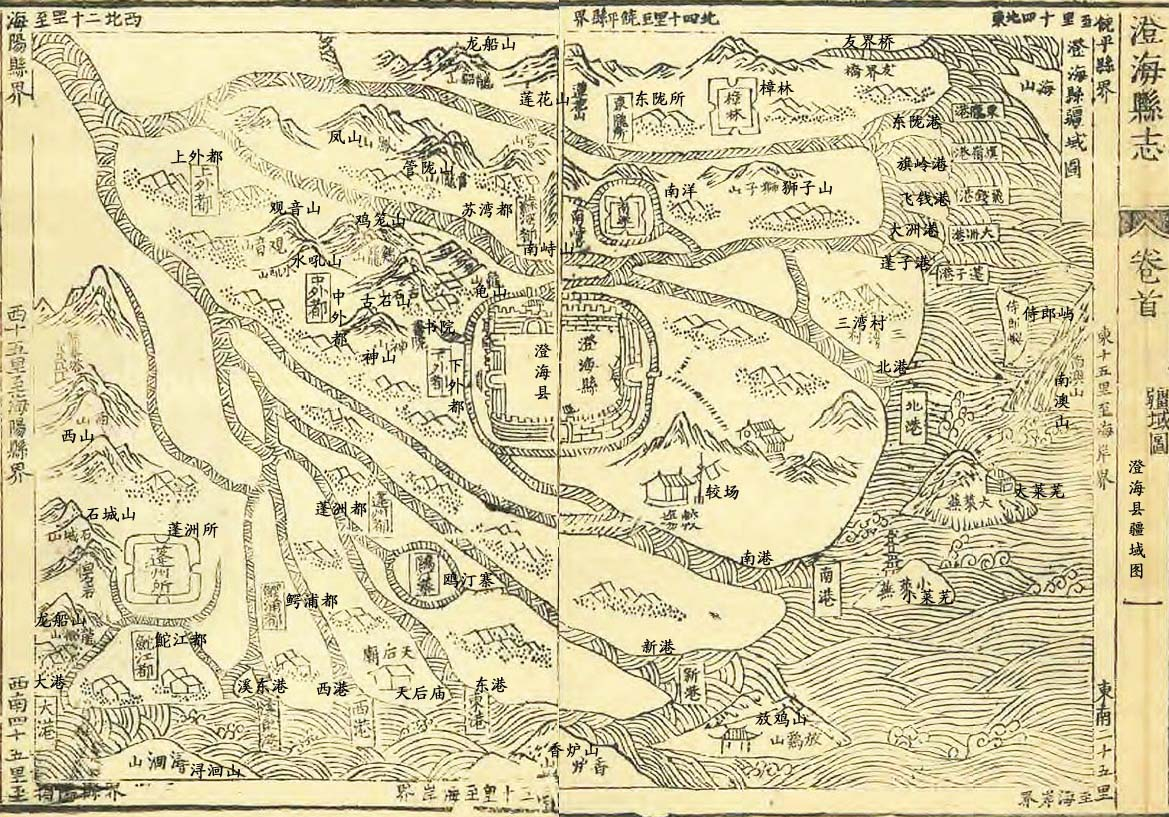
Map of Chenghai County in Ming dynasty.

Chenghai was known as one of "Eight Counties of Teochew" (Chinese: 潮州八邑) in the Qing Dynasty and Republic of China period. It was founded as a county in 1563 AD, combining by the coastal lands separated from Haiyang County, Jieyang County and Raoping County, and under Chao Prefecture (Teochew)'s jurisdiction. The name Chenghai, meaning "clear [the Wokou of] the sea" (Chinese: 澄清海氛), was used as the county name due to the Jiajing wokou raids, which also indicated the reason of Chenghai's establishment. Chenghai was dissolved in 1666 when Kangxi Emperor banned on foreign trade but re-founded seven years later.

In 1860, Shantou, which lay in the southwest of Chenghai, was opened for foreigners and became a trading port according to Treaty of Tientsin. Shantou separated from Chenghai and became a city in 1921. Then Chenghai County was administered by Shantou conversely. On 21 June 1939, Japanese troops invaded the county town of Chenghai. Japanese force occupied Chenghai until 15 August 1945. The Communist People's Liberation Army captured Chenghai on 24 October 1949, 23 days after the People's Republic of China was founded.

From 1994 onward, Chenghai was upgraded to a county-level city and was administered by the Provincial Government directly (custody by Shantou). On 19 May 2003, Chenghai was absorbed as a district by Shantou. Chenghai became a part of Shantou Special Economic Zone on 1 May 2011.

== Climate ==
Chenghai has a sunny climate, with plenty of rainfall, belonging to south subtropical monsoon climate. Controlled by cold high atmospheric pressure from the polar, winters are dry. Summers are humid and rainy with high temperatures.

Climate data for Chenghai, elevation 4 m (13 ft), (1991–2020 normals, extremes 1981–present)
| Month | Jan | Feb | Mar | Apr | May | Jun | Jul | Aug | Sep | Oct | Nov | Dec | Year |
|---|---|---|---|---|---|---|---|---|---|---|---|---|---|
| Record high °C (°F) | 29.4 (84.9) | 30.9 (87.6) | 31.3 (88.3) | 33.9 (93.0) | 38.3 (100.9) | 36.8 (98.2) | 39.8 (103.6) | 37.1 (98.8) | 36.7 (98.1) | 34.9 (94.8) | 33.3 (91.9) | 29.9 (85.8) | 39.8 (103.6) |
| Mean daily maximum °C (°F) | 18.4 (65.1) | 18.8 (65.8) | 21.0 (69.8) | 24.8 (76.6) | 28.2 (82.8) | 30.6 (87.1) | 32.3 (90.1) | 32.2 (90.0) | 31.3 (88.3) | 28.5 (83.3) | 24.9 (76.8) | 20.6 (69.1) | 26.0 (78.7) |
| Daily mean °C (°F) | 14.5 (58.1) | 15.0 (59.0) | 17.2 (63.0) | 21.2 (70.2) | 25.0 (77.0) | 27.6 (81.7) | 28.8 (83.8) | 28.6 (83.5) | 27.7 (81.9) | 24.6 (76.3) | 20.8 (69.4) | 16.5 (61.7) | 22.3 (72.1) |
| Mean daily minimum °C (°F) | 11.6 (52.9) | 12.4 (54.3) | 14.7 (58.5) | 18.7 (65.7) | 22.6 (72.7) | 25.3 (77.5) | 26.2 (79.2) | 26.0 (78.8) | 24.9 (76.8) | 21.6 (70.9) | 17.7 (63.9) | 13.4 (56.1) | 19.6 (67.3) |
| Record low °C (°F) | 2.2 (36.0) | 4.2 (39.6) | 3.1 (37.6) | 8.7 (47.7) | 15.0 (59.0) | 18.6 (65.5) | 20.9 (69.6) | 22.2 (72.0) | 18.0 (64.4) | 12.5 (54.5) | 7.2 (45.0) | 0.1 (32.2) | 0.1 (32.2) |
| Average precipitation mm (inches) | 37.6 (1.48) | 49.8 (1.96) | 87.6 (3.45) | 139.4 (5.49) | 186.6 (7.35) | 272.9 (10.74) | 226.0 (8.90) | 259.2 (10.20) | 141.5 (5.57) | 32.2 (1.27) | 41.3 (1.63) | 39.1 (1.54) | 1,513.2 (59.58) |
| Average precipitation days (≥ 0.1 mm) | 6.4 | 8.7 | 11.0 | 12.1 | 14.5 | 16.0 | 13.2 | 13.3 | 9.4 | 3.5 | 4.5 | 6.1 | 118.7 |
| Average relative humidity (%) | 77 | 80 | 81 | 82 | 84 | 86 | 83 | 83 | 79 | 73 | 75 | 74 | 80 |
| Mean monthly sunshine hours | 157.1 | 122.2 | 124.9 | 140.4 | 169.2 | 188.6 | 257.2 | 232.6 | 219.8 | 222.2 | 185.1 | 167.9 | 2,187.2 |
| Percentage possible sunshine | 47 | 38 | 34 | 37 | 41 | 47 | 62 | 58 | 60 | 62 | 56 | 51 | 49 |
Source: China Meteorological AdministrationAll-time May highAll-time June Highall-time November high

== Economy ==
Chenghai, with a deep cultural tradition, is an economic area in East Guangdong. Its characteristic industries and local brands take the leading position in China and have a high reputation in the world market. Chenghai is titled as China Toys & Gifts City (in April 2003), China's Famous City of Woolen Sweaters (in January 2014), Model Base on Transformation and Upgrading of National Foreign Trade, National Advanced Culture Area, National Science Demonstration Area, State Torch Program Feature Industry Base, Guangdong Animation (Toys) Creative Industrial Cluster, China Export Base of Toys and Gifts and so on.

=== Toy industry ===
The crafts and toys industry in Shantou is one of the three major production bases of its kind in China. Chenghai District is the only "China Toys and Gifts City" awarded by China Light Industry Union, and has won the title of "Chenghai Industrial Base of Creative Design and Manufacture of Intelligent Toys in the National Torch Program" awarded by the Ministry of Science and Technology of China. It now has more than 4,000 local toy, gift and anime manufacturers, franchisers and service providers. In 2013, the output value of Chenghai toys, gifts and animation was up 14% over the past year and reached more than 31 billion yuan, 70% of which were export earnings. In 2013, the output value of Chenghai's anime industry was 5.8 billion yuan, up 61% from a year ago. Now four listed companies have sprung up in this area. They are Guangdong Alpha Animation and Culture, Huawei Technology, Qunxing Toys, Rastar Group. Chenghai now has formed a complete toy industrial chain, which includes toy design and development, mould making, producing and processing, printing and packaging, exhibition and trade promotion, logistics distribution and so forth. Eight advantages of its toy manufacturing industry: industrial clusters, trade facilitation, vast diversity of types, attractive designs, quality assurance, constellation of brands, appropriate prices and high added value. The district was listed in the 2021 Notorious Markets List due to the prevalence of counterfeit toy factories.

== Education ==
=== Known senior high schools ===
There are four key senior high schools in Chenghai, including Chenghai Middle School, Subei Middle School, Experimental Middle School and Overseas Chinese High School. Chenghai Middle School is the most famous one.

- Chenghai Middle School

Located in No. 16 Cultural (Wenhua) Road, it is set up in September 1915, which is the first county middle school in east Guangdong. It was rated as the first class school of Guangdong Province in 1994. Outstanding alumnus of this school includes Qin Mu (a famous modern writer), Zheng Songhui (the deputy chief designer of Shenzhou V Spacecraft), etc.

== Tourist attractions ==
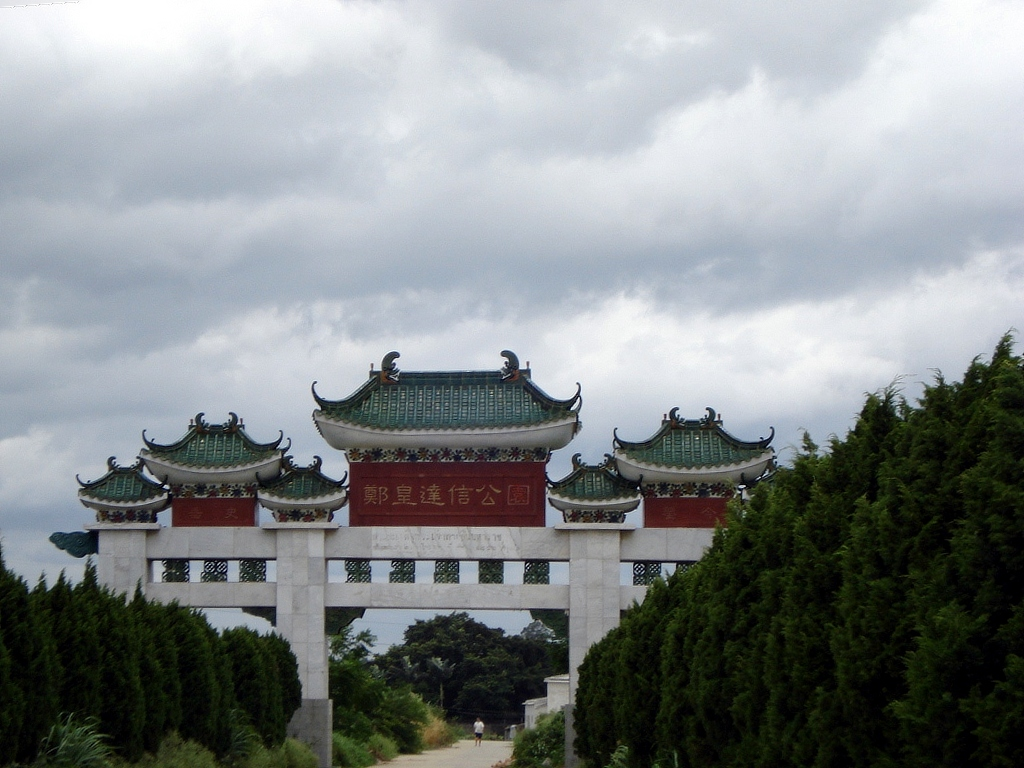
Entrance of King Taksin's tomb

There are 25 attractions open to the public.

- Chen Cihong's Residence (Nice Breeze in Cihong's Residence, one of Shantou's Eight Sights)

Known as the best overseas Chinese residence in Lingnan and a key protected cultural relics in Guangdong Province, Chen Cihong's Former Residence was built by the famous Chen Hongli family in Qianmei Village, Longdu Town, Chenghai District. The construction of the residence started in 1910, lasted almost 30 years and was not finished until 1939. The 25,400-sqm residence consists of 506 rooms in 4 complex houses where the traditional Chaoshan architectural style of "4-horse-drawn chariot" goes well with western villas. The 4 complex houses are Langzhong Mansion, Shoukang Dwelling, Shanju Chamber and Sanlu Study, and strewed between them are pavilions, terraces, corridors and overpasses, forming a giant courtyard. The residence is basically built with brick and timber and decorated with Teochew woodcarving, stone carvings, plaster sculptures, porcelain and glass. Galleries for puppet shows, local operas, folk customs and handicrafts are opened here and local Shuangyao'e (geese fight) square dance and tea performance are staged in the residence. It is actually a museum for the overseas Chinese culture in Chaoshan area.

- Lianhua Scenery Area: one of AAAA National Tourist Attractions, a characteristic tourism town and Eco-Demonstration Town in Guangdong.

It was located in Lianhua Town, Chenghai District. There are a series of attractions, including Xipu Village (patriotism education base and art sketch base), the Lotus Temple (a protected cultural relics in Chenghai District and a religious culture area), the Sheng'an ancient village with the style of Hakka circular house, Lotus Mountain Hot-Spring Holiday Resort, Nature Leisure Farm and Yuandong Chinese orchid Co. (place of planting orchids).

- Cultural Revolution Museum:

First Museum of Cultural Revolution

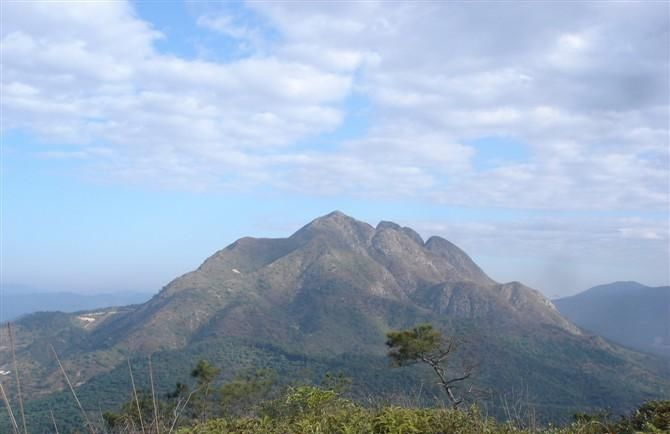
Mountain Lianhua, highest mountain of Chenghai District

As the writer Ba Jin dreamed of, this may be the first non-official museum in China mainland dedicated to the Cultural Revolution.

Some of the funding came from the Hong Kong businessman Li Ka-shing, originally from Shantou, who also funded Shantou University. Located at Mountain Ta in Lianshang Town of Chenghai District, the Cultural Revolution Museum was finished building and open on January 1, 2005. It is the first non-official museum in China built for memorizing Cultural Revolution. The museum is housed in a classical Chinese Pagoda-style building. In the museum, the hundreds of engravings come from a 1995 book called Cultural Revolution Museum, published by Yang Kelin in Hong Kong. There are shocking images of teachers and intellectuals in dunce hats being led out by farmers, of children and their dead parents and of zealots attaching revolutionary messages to large Buddha statues.

- Laiwu Island:

Laiwu is the name of a town belonging to Chenghai District. Located in Laiwu Tourist Resort (one of AAA National Tourist Attractions) at East Chenghai, facing Nao'ao Island across the sea, Laiwu Island has an area of 6 square kilometers, which is known for its charming natural scenery, the historical sites and the legend of goddess Laiwu. Seaweed is the famous products in Laiwu.

== Notable individuals ==
- Qin Mu: a famous modern writer
- Peng Qi'an: a mayor of Shantou who founded the first and only memorial museum in mainland China dedicated to the Cultural Revolution

The ancestors of the following people were born in Chenghai:

- Chatichai Choonhavan (Thai: ชาติชาย ชุณหะวัณ): former Prime Minister of Thailand.
- Chen Yulu (Chinese: 陈雨露; pinyin: Chen Yǔlù): Chinese economist, educator, author, and politician, deputy governor of People's Bank of China.
- Sammi Cheng (Chinese: 鄭秀文): Hong Kong Cantopop singer and actress.
- Pridi Banomyong (Thai: ปรีดี พนมยงค์; Chinese: 陈嘉祥/陈璋茂): former Prime Minister and Senior Statesman of Thailand
- Taksin (Thai: สมเด็จพระเจ้ากรุงธนบุรี; Chinese: 鄭昭; pinyin: Zhèng Zhāo; Teochew: Dênchao): the first and only monarch of Thonburi kingdom.
