= 1978 Truth Criterion Controversy =

Sociopolitical debate in China

The 1978 Truth Criterion Controversy (Chinese: 真理标准大讨论; lit. 'Debate on Standards for Judging the Truth'), also known as the 1978 Truth Criterion Discussion, sometimes referred to as the First Great Debate (Chinese: 第一次大争论) in contemporary China, was a sociopolitical debate around 1978, mainly revolving around Hua Guofeng's "Two Whatevers" and Deng Xiaoping's "Reform and opening up". The debate was also the origin of the "New Enlightenment" in mainland China in the 1980s.

The core debate centered on what should be the criterion for determining truth:

1. "Two Whatevers" — This slogan emphasized that Mao's directives were the ultimate truth guide, focusing on political-ideological authority.
2. "Practice is the sole criterion" — This stance highlighted empirical outcomes and social practice as the true tests of validity.
3. Hybrid views — Some proposals sought to blend theory and practice, encouraging a broader interpretation of Mao's thought beyond isolated quotes, while stressing the importance of "seeking truth from facts."

== Background ==
=== End of Cultural Revolution ===
==== Death of Mao Zedong ====
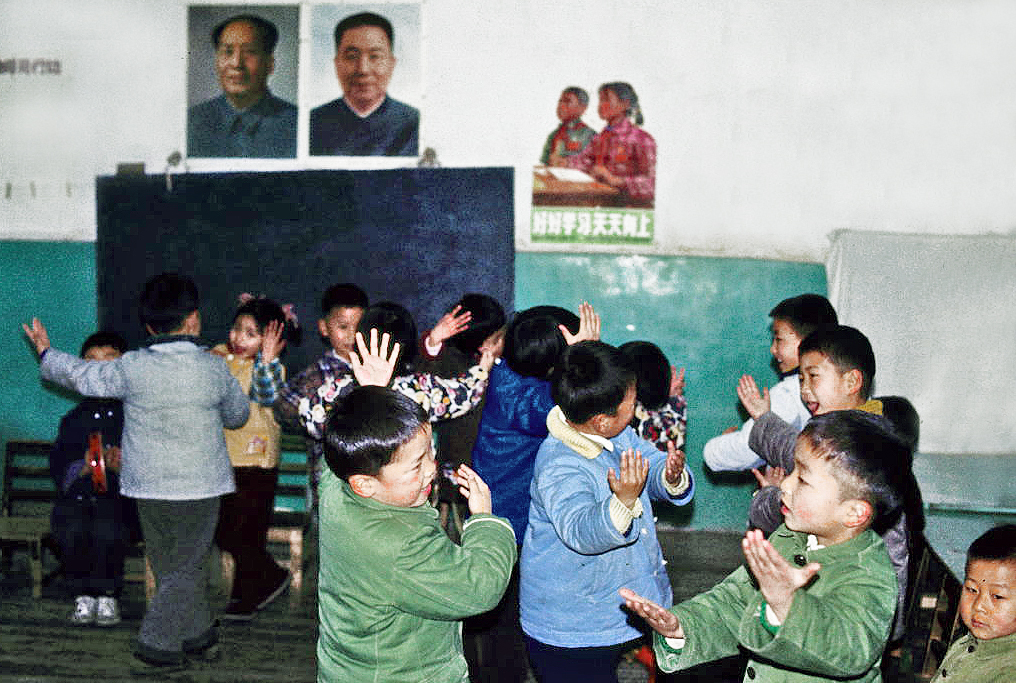
In 1978, a classroom of a kindergarten in Shanghai with wall portraits of then-Chairman Hua Guofeng and former Chairman Mao Zedong

Mao Zedong, organizer of the Cultural Revolution and then Chairman of the Chinese Communist Party (CCP), died on September 9, 1976, at the age of 82, which caused a power vacuum within the CCP. As Mao hadn't chosen an official successor and after conflicts between various factions emerged during and after the Cultural Revolution, Hua Guofeng, a moderate Maoist, held the position of chairman.

==== Arrest of the Gang of Four ====
One month after Mao's death, Hua Guofeng together with Ye Jianying and Wang Dongxing arrested the radical faction Gang of Four, which is generally thought to have put an end to the Cultural Revolution. Beginning on 21 October, nationwide denunciations of the Gang of Four occurred, which culminated in the December release of files related to the Gang's alleged crimes to the public. The Party issued a denunciation of the Gang as "ultra-left", which was "left in form, right in essence". A broader purge targeting radicals was initiated to discredit their ideologies and policies later.

Members of the Gang of Four were charged with "counterrevolutionary activities" three years later, while few of them compromised. Jiang Qing, a member of the Gang of Four and the widow of Mao, shouted "Revolution is no crime!" against the charge during the trial. The trial has also been accused of being a "show trial" due to its political motivations.

=== Mao's legacies ===
==== Maoist ideologies and policies ====
At the time of Mao's death, China's society and culture were seriously impacted by the Cultural Revolution. It is estimated tens of millions was persecuted during the Cultural Revolution. The economy of China was thought to be weak, if not collapsed. However, Mao's thoughts and policies still undergirded the Chinese society. As nearly half the CCP members were recruited as "leftists" during the Cultural Revolution, some feared the radicals could recapture the power.

Deng Xiaoping, one promoter of the Controversy, had already been denounced as a "capitalist roader" during the Cultural Revolution. Deng had been purged twice and promised to Mao and the Central Committee twice that he would "never ever reverse the verdict" as a "capitalist roader". However, Deng attempted to reverse the radical tide during the Cultural Revolution in 1975, which was bluntly rebuffed by Mao. Mao later reiterated "...'never ever reverse the verdict' just cannot be trusted!" In April 1976, after the 1976 Tiananmen Incident, Mao dismissed Deng for the third time, which led to the "Criticize Deng, Counterattack the Right-Deviationist Reversal-of-Verdicts Trend" campaign initiated by the Gang of Four.

==== "Two Whatevers" ====
"Two Whatevers" refers to a slogan associated with the Gang of Four, "Whatever Chairman Mao had said or done was correct." Though the members of the Gang of Four were arrested in 1976, Hua, as Mao's successor, continued to advocate the slogan in opposition to Deng's market reform. Centered around the slogan, Hua's supporters and the remaining leftists formed the "Whateverist Faction".

== Process ==
=== Rise of Deng Xiaoping and Hu Yaobang ===
At the end of the Cultural Revolution, Hua still held the dominant power in the party, and some of the revolutionary leftists and the military supported him. As Hua changed few policies and rules after Mao, he was gradually gaining more and more enemies. Hua believed Deng's market reform was too divisive to party unity and social stability, which made him emphasize "stability and unity". However, Deng took advantage of the accumulated discontent from the previous "Hundred Flowers Movement" and "Democracy Movement", as well as the failure of Hua to reconcile the various factions to build up strength.

On March 3, 1977, Hu Yaobang, a collaborator of Deng, became the second vice-president of the Central Party School. Hu removed some radicals from the Central Party School and brought in new people, and, like Deng, Hu also questioned the legitimacy of the Cultural Revolution and called upon the staffs of the Central Party School to "Liberate your thinking!" Furthermore, Hu ordered them to "use practice as the criterion for testing the truth and for determining the rights and wrongs of a line, and seek the truth from facts when doing research." Though competing with Deng, Hua also supported a relaxation on thinking, as he encouraged others to speak and criticize.

Deng also campaigned an offensive to the leftist supporters of Hua, who were proven to be more vulnerable due to their ideologies. With a series of political adjustments, Deng gradually moved his power from the provinces to the center. In May 1977, with the rehabilitation of Deng, he rose for the third time and explicitly condemned the "Two Whatevers". Five months later, Deng proposed the idea of "Boluan Fanzheng" as a political slogan, which would later be used to initiate the reform after the Cultural Revolution.

=== Publication of "Practice is the Sole Criterion for Testing Truth" ===
Though experiencing fierce debate, the conflicts within the party were not publicized until the publication of the article "Practice is the Sole Criterion for Testing Truth", while some articles holding a similar opinion were published early. In October 1977, Hu Fuming, a philosophy teacher, submitted the article under the title "Practice is the Criterion of Truth" to Guangming Daily, which was later revised and edited by Hu's supporters. On May 11, 1978, the revised edition, namingly "Practice is the Sole Criterion for Testing Truth", was published in Guangming Daily, and was reprinted in People's Daily the following day. The article created an immediate stir and brought the debate into the public.

The "Whateverist faction" quickly responded. Editor-in-chief of Hongqi commented that "In theory it is absurd; in ideology, it is reactionary; in politics it cuts down [Mao's] banner." Wu Lengxi, an influential official of the CPC, stated that the article made "an error in orientation", and denied "the universal of truth of Marxism". Zhang Pinghua, the Director of the CPCCentral Propaganda Department, openly criticized the article in a lecture with provincial Propaganda Department leaders and provincial Party secretaries responsible for culture and education. Various attitudes towards the criterion of truth also existed.

On June 2, 1978, one month after the publication, Deng expressed his support for the article in at an All-Army Political Work Conference. It is suggested that Deng's speech reconstructed the ideological base of the CPC. However, the debate was not ended at that time, as it gradually moved to the point of "the relationship between the criterion and the guiding role of Marxism". As Hua's supporters continued to attack the ideological conflicts within the article, Deng and his supporters attempted to reconcile them. Deng quoted Mao's "seeking truth from fact" to defend the compatibility between Marxism and the criterion.

Towards the end of June, there was little evidence indicating how the debate would be solved.

=== 3rd plenary session of the 11th Central Committee of the Chinese Communist Party ===
In October, the CPC held a central meeting to prepare for the 3rd plenary session of the 11th Central Committee. Deng's faction began to occupy a more favorable position. Deng himself also criticized the practice of putting the party in place of the government at all administrative levels during the Cultural Revolution. Official newspapers reported that many veterans ordered the rehabilitation of the victims during the Cultural Revolution, which is thought to undermined the authority of Hua. Hua himself made a self-criticism against the "Two Whatevers" during the preparatory meeting, remarking that:

The formulation with the two "whatevers" was even more absolute, and even more inappropriate. To a greater or lesser extent it stifled everybody's thinking, made the practical implementation of the Party's policy difficult, and did not facilitate the livening up of the ideology of the Party. At the time, those two sentences were not very well thought out. Now it seems as if it would have been better not to mention the two "whatevers".

The 3rd plenary session of the 11th Central Committee of the CPC was held from December 18 to December 22, 1978. The "Two Whatevers" were also described as "erroneous", and the practice criterion was further developed. Hua and his supporter Wang Dongxing were criticized and Wang had no way but to offer a self-criticism.

Chen Yun, an influential official, called for re-evaluations about the impactful actions related to the Gang of Four, including the "61 Renegades" case, the "surrendees" case, the Wang Heshou and Tao Zhu case, the re-burial of Peng Dehuai, the 1976 Tiananmen Incident, the rejudgement of Kang Sheng, all of which were agreed by most people who attended the meeting.

A number of Deng's allies were added to the Politburo (Chen Yun, Deng Yingchao, Hu Yaobang and Wang Zhen). The party line was also changed to the "Four Modernizations". Under the influence of Deng and Chen, the charges against the victims of many previous purges were officially repudiated.

== See also ==
- Seek truth from facts
