= Yunnan Cultural Revolution Massacre =

Yunnan Cultural Revolution Massacre may refer to any of the massacres in Yunnan Province, China during the Chinese Cultural Revolution (1966–1976):

- The massacre in Zhao Jianmin Spy Case, which led to the deaths of more than 17,000 people from 1968–1969.
- The massacre in Shadian incident, which led to the deaths of 1,600 people in July and August of 1975.
