= Two Whatevers =

Chinese communist political doctrine

The "Two Whatevers" (Chinese: 两个凡是; pinyin: Liǎng gè fán shì) refers to the statement that "We will resolutely uphold whatever policy decisions Chairman Mao made, and unswervingly follow whatever instructions Chairman Mao gave" (凡是毛主席作出的决策，我们都坚决维护；凡是毛主席的指示，我们都始终不渝地遵循).

The policy was advocated by the Chinese Communist Party chairman Hua Guofeng, Mao's successor, who had earlier ended the Cultural Revolution and arrested the Gang of Four. In a 7 February 1977 editorial titled "Study the Documents Well and Grasp the Key Link" which appeared in People's Daily, Red Flag, and People's Liberation Army Daily, Hua articulated the "Two Whatevers" slogan: "We will resolutely uphold whatever policy decisions Chairman Mao made, and unswervingly follow whatever instructions Chairman Mao gave". The slogan was underscoring Mao's testament that designated Hua as his successor.

It proved a trigger for Deng Xiaoping's manoeuvre in 1978 to implement economic reform policy in China, and eventually led to Hua being demoted from the party leadership in 1980. Even before he was fully rehabilitated, Deng described the "Two Whatevers" as being contrary to the essence of Marxism. On 11 May 1978, Guangming Daily published a front-page editorial, titled "Practice is the sole criterion for testing truth," criticizing the "Two Whatevers". In June 1978, Deng endorsed the perspective of the editorial at an All-Army Political Work Conference. Deng stated that Marxist theory should not be "lifeless dogma" and cited Mao's method of seeking truth from facts, contrasting the "Two Whatevers" with the view that "only through practice can the correctness of one's ideas be proved, and there is no other way of testing truth."

The coalition of Hua's political supporters, referred to as the "whateverist faction", also lost its power after Deng's political manoeuvre: Wang Dongxing, Ji Dengkui, Wu De, and Chen Xilian, the so-called "Little Gang of Four", were relieved of all their Party and state posts during the 5th Plenum of the 11th Central Committee of the CCP, 23–29 February 1980.

== See also ==
- 1978 Truth Criterion Controversy
