= Guangming Daily =

Chinese Communist Party daily newspaper

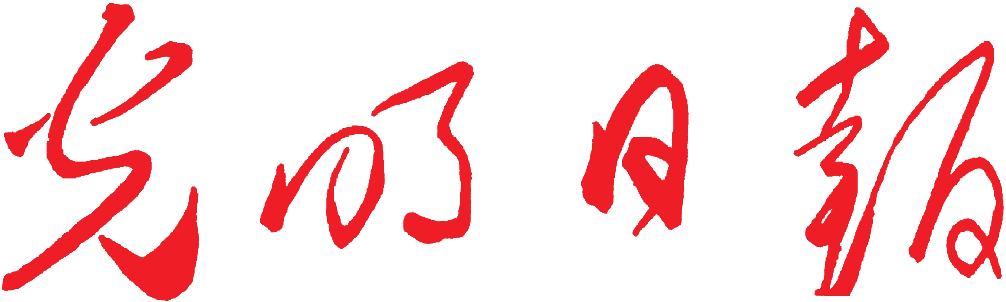

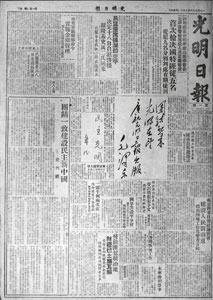
- Front page of the first issue on 16 June 1949
- Type: Daily newspaper
- Format: Broadsheet
- Owner(s): Chinese Communist Party (1982–present); China Democratic League (1949–1982)
- Publisher: Guangming Daily Press
- Founded: 16 June 1949; 76 years ago
- Political alignment: Chinese Communist Party
- Language: Chinese
- Headquarters: Beijing
- ISSN: 1002-3666
- Website: www.gmw.cn

Chinese name
- Simplified Chinese: 光明日报
- Traditional Chinese: 光明日報
Transcriptions
Standard Mandarin
- Hanyu Pinyin: Guāngmíng Rìbào
- Wade–Giles: Kuang-ming Jih-pao

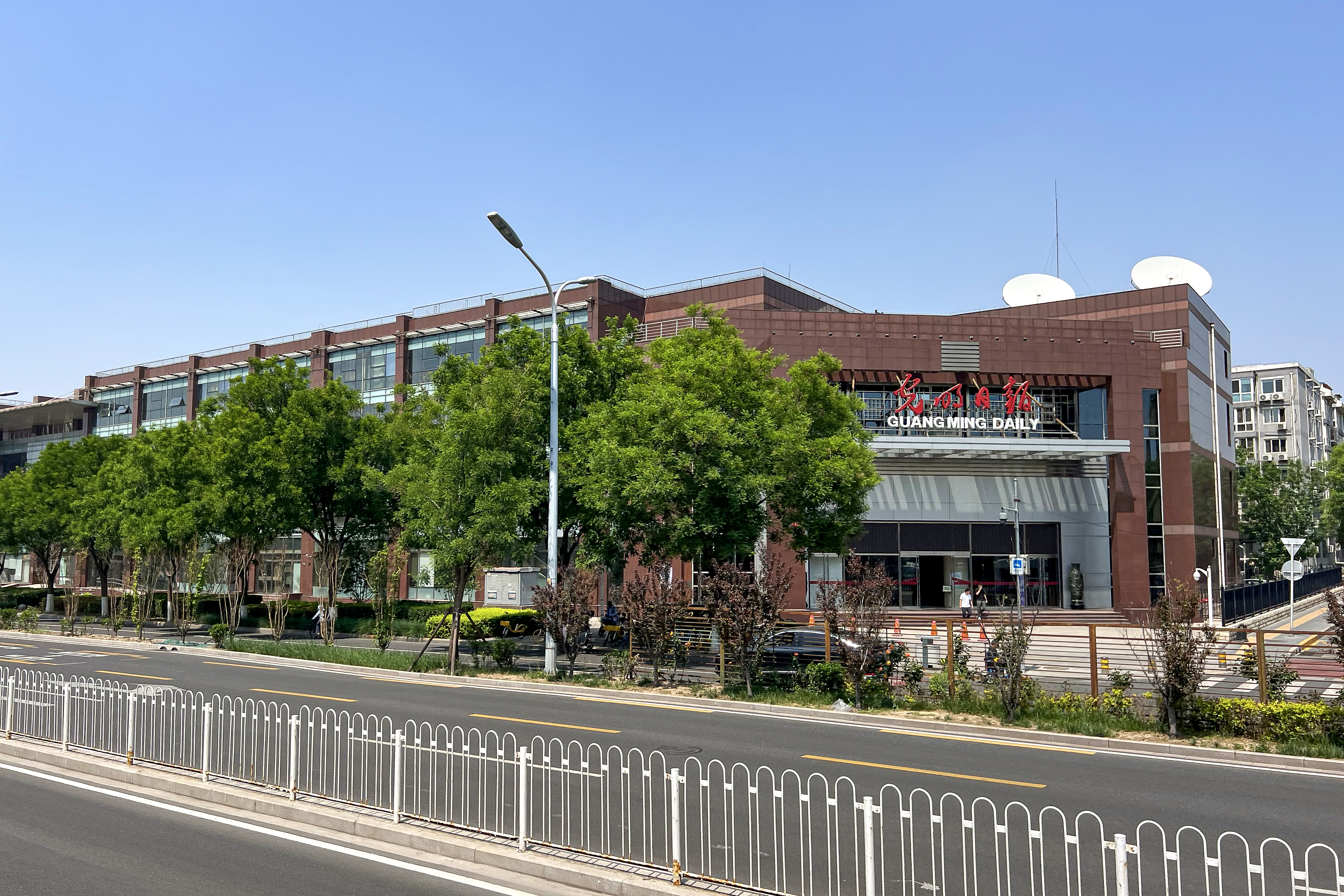
Headquarters of Guangming Daily in 2024

The Guangming Daily, also known as the Enlightenment Daily, is a national Chinese-language daily newspaper published in the People's Republic of China. It was established in 1949 as the official paper of the China Democratic League. Starting from 1982, it was run by the Chinese Communist Party (CCP), and was officially reorganized directly under the Central Publicity Department of the CCP from 1994. As one of China's "big three" newspapers during the Cultural Revolution, it played an important role in the political struggle between Hua Guofeng and the Gang of Four in 1976 and between Hua and Deng Xiaoping in 1978.

== History ==
The Guangming Daily, then romanized as Kuangming, was launched on 16 June 1949 in Beijing. It was originally the official newspaper of the China Democratic League, but later became the Chinese Communist Party's official organ for China's educated elite.

In 1955, Guangming Daily became the first newspaper in China to fully switch to the left-to-right horizontal text format.

During the Cultural Revolution (1966–1976), Guangming Daily was one of the only three national newspapers that remained in circulation, together with the People's Daily and the People's Liberation Army Daily, and the sole magazine Red Flag. The four periodicals, known as "the three papers and one magazine", dominated China's public affairs. For safety reasons, regional newspapers and specialist magazines all took cues from the big four, and largely reprinted articles from them.

Before the death of Mao Zedong, the paper fell under the control of the radical left-lean Gang of Four led by Mao's widow Jiang Qing. In October 1976, Vice Premier Ji Dengkui played a significant role in taking over the Guangming Daily, helping Mao's successor Hua Guofeng oust the Gang of Four and put an end to the Cultural Revolution.

In 1978, the reformist CCP leader Hu Yaobang appointed Yang Xiguang, formerly with Shanghai's Jiefang Daily, chief editor of the Guangming Daily. Under Yang's editorship, Guangming was the first Chinese newspaper to stop publishing Chairman Mao's Quotations on the front page every day. On 11 May 1978, it published Hu Fuming's famous editorial "Practice is the Sole Criterion for Testing Truth", refuting Hua Guofeng's Two Whatevers theory in support of Deng Xiaoping's Reform and Opening policy. The article was quickly reprinted in almost all major Chinese newspapers, cementing support for Deng's victory over Hua.

In November 1982, the newspaper was designated as under the control of the Central Committee of the Chinese Communist Party. In August 1984, it was restructured to be under the direct control of the Central Publicity Department of the Chinese Communist Party.

In 1998, Guangming Daily launched its official website, which was one of the earliest news websites in China.

Two Guangming Daily journalists, Xu Xinghu (许杏虎) and his wife Zhu Ying (朱颖), were killed on the night of 7 May 1999 in the United States bombing of the Chinese embassy in Belgrade during the NATO bombing of Yugoslavia.

In March 2018, Guangming Daily won the Third National Top 100 Newspapers in China.

The Guangming Daily has been documented to have been used as cover by Ministry of State Security (MSS) officers posing as journalists overseas. In January 2026, Czech authorities arrested the Prague correspondent for Guangming Daily on suspicion of espionage.

== Circulation and content ==
Guangming Daily's circulation reached 1.5 million in 1987, but as independent publications flourished during the Reform and Opening era, it dropped to 800,000 in 1993. To survive in the market, it reduced political coverage and propaganda, and increased its coverage on culture and science. Guangming Daily is considered to be a less political newspaper, and today focuses mostly on cultural, educational and scientific content.

== Organization ==
Guangming Daily is published by Guangming Daily Press, a deputy-ministerial-level institution.

In 2003, Guangming Daily partnered with the Nanfang Media Group (publisher of the highly successful Southern Weekly) to jointly publish The Beijing News, which quickly became one of Beijing's most influential newspapers.

== Notable people ==
- Dong Yuyu
