= Three Loyalties and Four Limitlessnesses =

Chinese Communist Party slogan

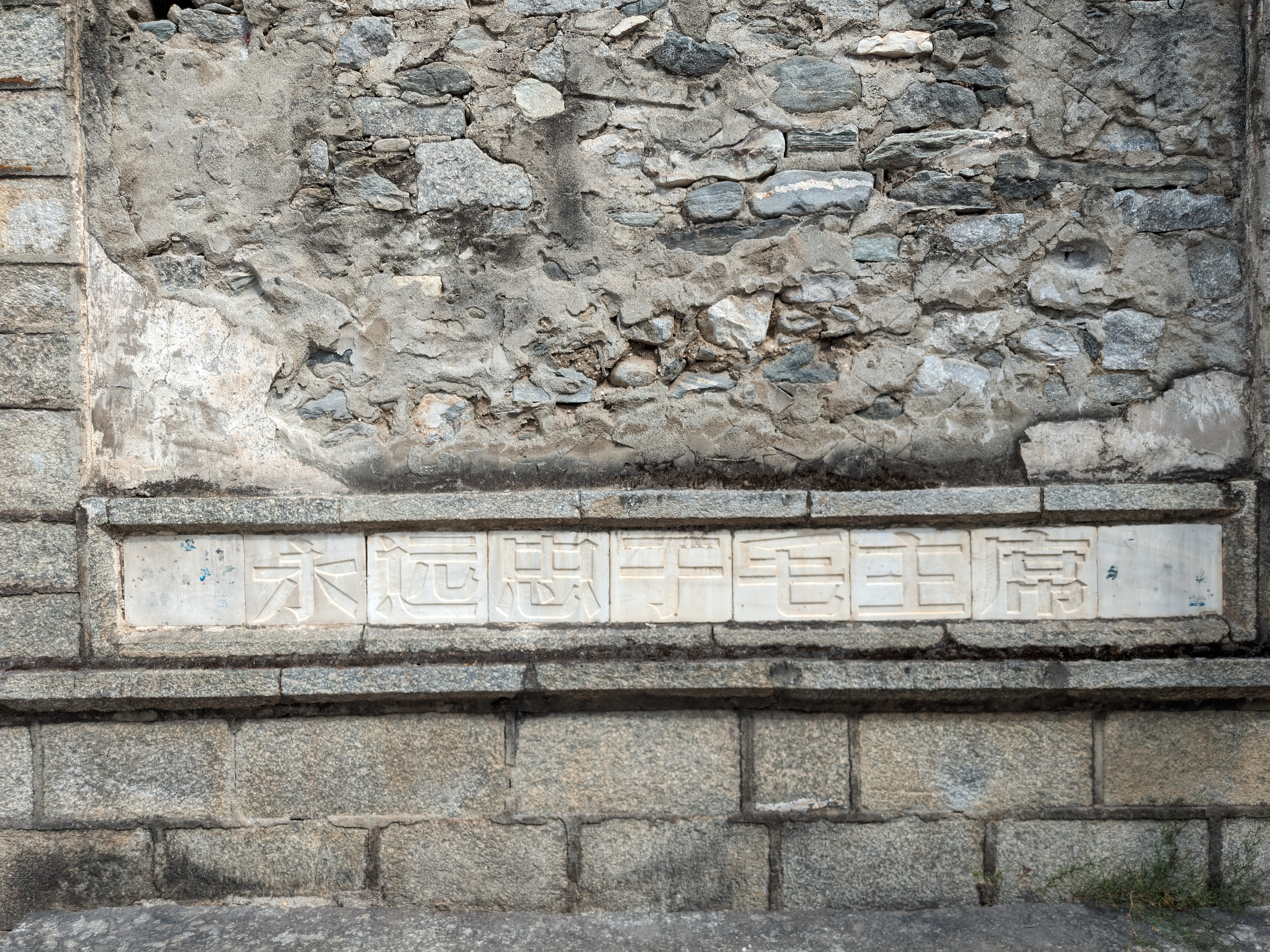
A screen wall in Dali, Yunnan Province, is inscribed with the words "Forever Loyal to Chairman Mao".

The Three Loyalties and Four Limitlessnesses (Chinese: 三忠于四无限; pinyin: Sān zhōngyú sì wúxiàn) was a political term used in China during the early stages of the Cultural Revolution, emphasizing Mao Zedong's cult of personality and loyalty to his ideology. Three Loyalties and Four Limitlessnesses was criticized by the authorities after the Cultural Revolution ended.

Three Loyalties was one of the important daily activities in those years. In 1968, the Three Loyalties activities (loyalty to Chairman Mao, loyalty to Mao Zedong Thought, and to Chairman Mao's revolutionary line) reached a climax in various places, and the singing of model operas, the performance of loyalty dances, and "early reporting and evening reporting" were widely carried out.

== History ==
On 31 October 1966, the People's Liberation Army Daily published an editorial entitled A Communist Fighter Dedicated to the Public Good, commemorating Cai Yongxiang, a People's Liberation Army soldier who sacrificed his life to save a Red Guard bus. On 17 November, the General Political Department of the PLA issued a special notice calling on all officers, soldiers, and militia members to learn from Cai Yongxiang's motto of "Forever loyal to Chairman Mao, forever loyal to Mao Zedong Thought." On 24 March 1968, Lin Biao added "Forever loyal to Chairman Mao's revolutionary line" to his important speech at a meeting with military cadres, forming the "Three Loyalties." On 4 December 1967, the People's Daily and the PLA Daily jointly published an editorial entitled "Studying Mao Zedong Thought Should Integrate Learning with Application and Achieve Immediate Results," which proposed "boundless love, boundless faith, boundless worship, and boundless loyalty." Since then, these "four boundless" expressions have become a fixed phrase.

In 1967, Lin Biao wrote an inscription for May Day: "Long live Chairman Mao, the great teacher, the great leader, the great commander, and the great helmsman! Long live Chairman Mao! Long live Chairman Mao!" Many people and publications afterwards said that Lin Biao's inscription concentratedly expressed his "boundless love, boundless faith, boundless worship, and boundless loyalty" to Chairman Mao, Mao Zedong Thought, and Chairman Mao's revolutionary line. Consequently, after 1968, various provinces began to launch the Three Loyalties and Four Limitlessnesses" movement, accompanied by "daily reading," "morning and evening reports", "badge craze", and "loyalty dances". In November 1971, Mao Zedong criticized: "I don't understand the Three Loyalties. You should have a meeting to discuss it and abolish the inappropriate nouns and adjectives. Don't do it anymore."

== Description ==
The Three Loyalties refer to:

- Loyalty to Chairman Mao (忠于毛主席)
- Loyalty to Mao Zedong Thought (忠于毛泽东思想)
- Loyalty to Chairman Mao's proletarian revolutionary line (忠于毛主席的无产阶级革命路线)

The Four Limitlessnesses refer to Chairman Mao, Mao Zedong Thought, and Chairman Mao's proletarian revolutionary line:

- Limitlessness worship (无限崇拜)
- Limitlessness love (无限热爱)
- Limitlessness faith (无限信仰)
- Limitlessness loyalty (无限忠诚)
