= Xi Jinping's cult of personality =

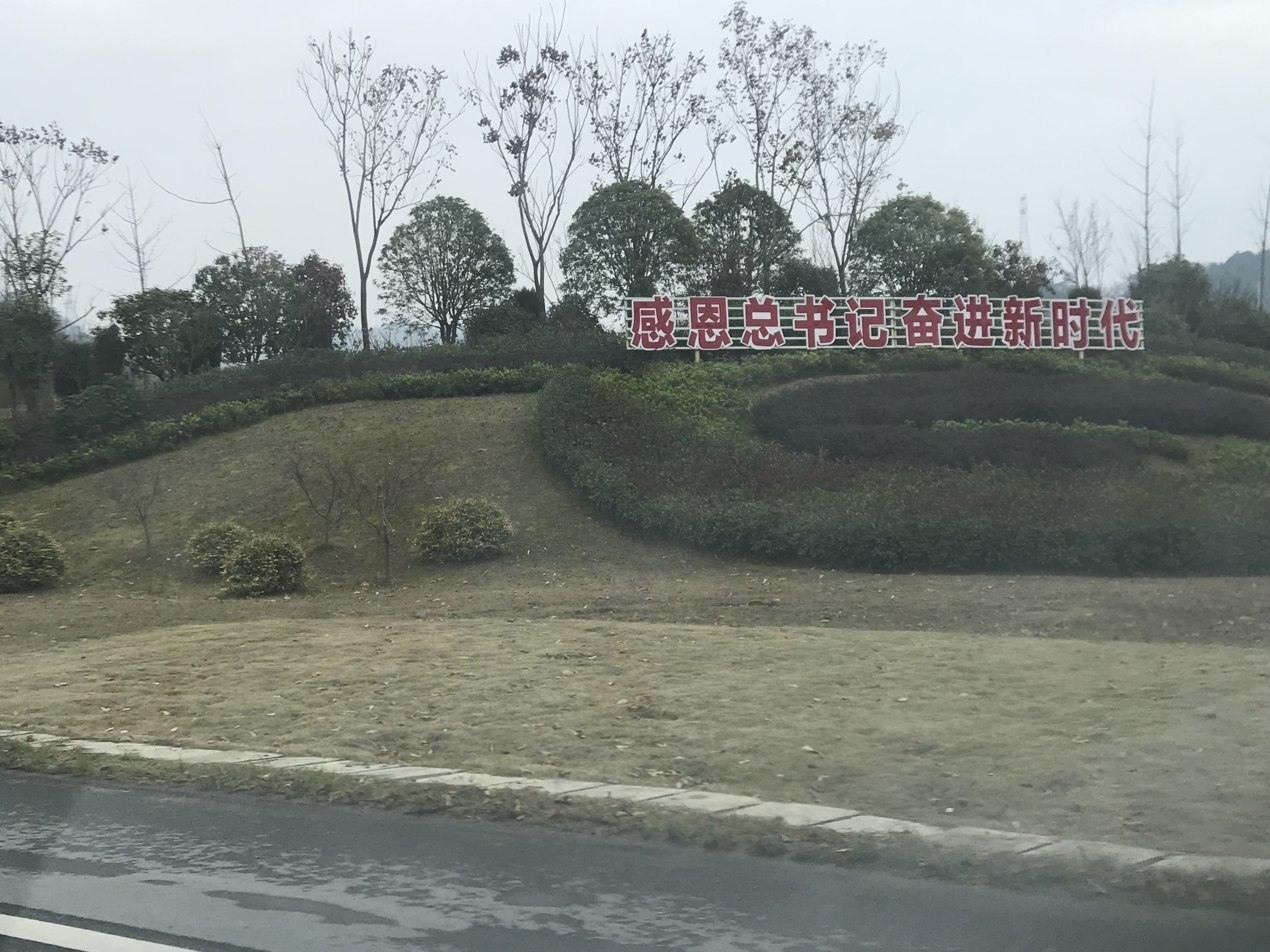
"Grateful to the General Secretary, Endeavoring towards a New Era", a Big-character poster slogan in Chun'an

A cult of personality has been developing around Xi Jinping ever since he became General Secretary of the Chinese Communist Party (CCP) in 2012.

== Background ==
After Deng Xiaoping started the reform and opening up and introduced the concept of collective leadership in the late 1970s, there was no longer a cult of personality around Chinese leaders. Deng and others wanted to prevent another leader from rising above the party as Mao Zedong had done. However, when Xi came to power in 2012, he started centralizing power and paved the way for a cult of personality.

The Chinese Communist Party (CCP) denies that there is any cult of personality around Xi. The CCP's rules explicitly forbid personality cults. Xie Chuntao, director of the government-funded Central Party School's academic department, claimed the "respect and love" ordinary Chinese felt for Xi was "natural" and "heartfelt" and bore no similarities to a cult of personality. He added that memories of the excesses of Mao's cult were strong enough that the CCP would not allow another leader to form a cult around himself.

== Characteristics ==
Since Xi assumed power in 2012, books, cartoons, pop songs and dance routines have honored his dictatorship. In 2017, the local government of Jiangxi province told Christians to replace their pictures of Jesus with Xi Jinping.

Writing in the Sydney Morning Herald, Philip Wen notes that "perhaps the most stunning characteristic shared with Mao has been a growing personality cult around Xi fanned by the central propaganda department, which has produced some jarring results: newspaper front-pages dominated by Xi's every move, saccharine music videos professing love and loyalty to the leader." In May 2016, just prior to the 50th anniversary celebration of Mao's Cultural Revolution, a "Mao-themed revival show" at the Great Hall of the People featuring revolutionary "red songs" was designed to generate nostalgia for the Mao era, with "giant images of Mao and Xi projected on stage."

In March 2017, Xi claimed that he carried bags of 110 kilograms of wheat over 3 miles of mountain road without changing shoulder, a feat deemed extraordinary and broadcast by China Central Television during what was described as an image-crafting campaign.

When he was re-elected in 2017, Xi dominated the front page of the People's Daily (Note: The paper is an official newspaper of the Central Committee of the Chinese Communist Party.) compared to previous editions, which emphasized a "collective leadership" model.

The political ideology bearing his name, Xi Jinping Thought, was enshrined into the CCP's constitution in the 19th National Congress in October 2017 and into the state constitution in 2018. China Central Television (CCTV) also showed members of the National People's Congress "crying in happiness" because of Xi Jinping's re-election as president in 2018.

Since October 2017, many universities across China have placed Xi Jinping Thought at the core of their curricula, the first time since Mao Zedong that a Chinese leader has been accorded similar academic stature. Fudan University revised their charter to remove "academic independence and freedom of thought" and include a "pledge to follow the Communist party's leadership", leading to protests among the students. It also said that Fudan University had to "equip its teachers and employees" with Xi Jinping Thought, leading to concerns about the diminishing academic freedom of Fudan.

Xi's cult of personality has been especially pronounced in Xinjiang. Former inmates in the Xinjiang re-education camps claimed that they were forced to give thanks to the leader by chanting "Long live Xi Jinping."

In October 2018, Hunan TV started airing a game show about Xi Jinping and his ideology. In January 2019, Alibaba released a mobile app for studying Xi Jinping Thought named Xuexi Qiangguo. (The name of the app is a pun on Xi Jinping's name. Xuéxí can mean "learning" or "learn from Xi.") As of October 2019, it had more than 100 million active users, and is now claimed to be the most downloaded item on Apple's domestic App Store, surpassing social media apps such as WeChat and TikTok (also known as Douyin in Mandarin).

Apps such as Toutiao, Tencent, and Sina have been forced to use what has been described as "a super algorithm", where the story at the top "has to be about Xi".

In October 2017, the CCP Politburo named Xi Jinping lingxiu (领袖), a reverent term for "leader" and a title previously only given to Chiang Kai-shek, Mao Zedong, and his immediate successor, Hua Guofeng. He is also sometimes called the "Great Helmsman" (大舵手), and in July 2018, Li Zhanshu, the Chairman of the Standing Committee of the National People's Congress, referred to Xi as the "eternal core" of the party. On 25 December 2019, the politburo officially named Xi as "People's Leader" (人民领袖; rénmín lǐngxiù), a title only Mao held previously.

In 2022, the 20th National Congress of the CCP added the "Two Upholds" into the Party's constitution, which established Xi as the "core" of the Central Committee and the CCP, and cemented his policies as guiding rules for the future of China.

In February 2024, the Chinese Communist Party held a meeting summarizing its nationwide campaign to study and implement Xi Jinping Thought on Socialism with Chinese Characteristics for a New Era. The campaign had been launched in 2023 and was intended to consolidate ideological unity within the party and strengthen political cohesion around Xi Jinping.

In May 2024, Xi called for the strengthening of ideological and political education in schools. He called for a system of textbooks centered on Xi Jinping Thought and for political education based on the ideology to be integrated across all levels of education, from elementary schools to universities.

In September 2024, Xi again called for Xi Jinping Thought to be used to educate students and for ideological and political education to be strengthened in schools. He called for young people to develop confidence in the ideology and in the goal of national rejuvenation.

In January 2025, the Ministry of Education identified strengthening the development of textbooks for courses on Xi Jinping Thought as one of its priorities for basic education. In March, the ministry again emphasized the development of textbooks and the use of Xi Jinping Thought in education.

In May 2025, the Central Party Literature Press published a five-volume collection of 29 articles concerning the study and implementation of Xi Jinping Thought. The articles, originally published in the People's Daily or Qiushi, covered speeches and writings by Xi Jinping since November 2023. It was the third such collection published since 2020.

In July 2025, books featuring Xi Jinping's writings and political thought, including On Education, Outline for Studying Xi Jinping Thought on Culture, and Xi Jinping among the People: Moments in Focus, were published in traditional Chinese in Hong Kong. The books were promoted as a means of helping readers in Hong Kong and Macau understand Xi Jinping Thought and strengthen their national and cultural identities.

In September 2025, the Party School of the Central Committee of the Chinese Communist Party published a standardized curriculum and teaching syllabus for Xi Jinping Thought. The 26-course curriculum was intended for the education and training of Communist Party members and officials and was described as providing standardized guidance for institutions teaching the party's theories.

In March 2026, the Publicity Department of the Central Committee of the Chinese Communist Party and the National Development and Reform Commission jointly published a question-and-answer study book on Xi Jinping Thought on the Economy. The book presented Xi's economic ideas as part of the broader ideological framework of Xi Jinping Thought and was intended to help party members, officials and the wider public understand and apply them.

In June 2026, Chinese state news agency Xinhua News Agency announced plans for an artificial-intelligence platform intended to promote Xi Jinping Thought. The project, called "Xinhua Yudian" (Xinhua Lexicon), was designed as an AI system for studying, researching and disseminating Xi Jinping Thought, using a curated corpus of official material to provide politically approved information.

== See also ==
- Cult of personality
  - Mao Zedong's cult of personality
  - Hua Guofeng's cult of personality
- Accelerator-in-Chief
- Rubao culture
