= Feudal fascism =

Term used to describe Maoist China

Feudal fascism, also revolutionary-feudal totalitarianism, were official terms used by the post-Mao Zedong Chinese Communist Party to designate the ideology and rule of Lin Biao and the Gang of Four during the Cultural Revolution. The draft of the Project 571, written in 1971, declared that China under Mao Zedong's rule pursued social fascism and social feudalism. At the Central Working Conference held in 1978, Ye Jianying was the first to call Lin Biao and the Gang of Four "feudal fascists". He believed that "Lin Biao and the Gang of Four used feudalism to disguise socialism, saying that they were using socialism to oppose capitalism, but in fact they were using feudalism to oppose socialism". This was recognized by Li Weihan, Hu Yaobang, Deng Xiaoping and others. In 1979, the Chairman of the Standing Committee of the National People's Congress, Ye Jianying, described Mao Zedong's reign as a “feudal-fascist dictatorship” due to his revolutionary terror-based cult of personality, nationalism, and authoritarianism despite superficially socialist policies.

== Rationale ==
In China's reform and opening up era, the Communist Party used the phrase to frame the excesses of the Cultural Revolution as coming from individual actors, such as those in the Gang of Four, rather than to the Party as a whole. After the death of Lin Biao and the conclusion of the Cultural Revolution, the official Communist Party interpretation was that Lin Biao and the Gang of Four represented the remnants of feudal ideology in China who had used the terrorist methods of fascism to suppress people's democracy. The methods criticized as feudal fascism included autocracy, ritualized dogma, mango worship, and military repression. It also referred to a general lack of stable integration between the party and the state, which came from abuse of the mass line and a lack of regard to the Yan'an process for handling inter-party dissent.

== Effects ==
In 1977, the People's Daily ran an editorial calling for more elections and other democratic institutions for China in order to prevent a repeat of feudal fascism. One line from the Constitution of the Chinese Communist Party was considered particularly emblematic of feudal fascism and was stripped during the post-Cultural Revolution 10th Congress: "Mao Zedong Thought is Marxism–Leninism of the era in which imperialism is heading for total collapse and socialism is advancing to world-wide victory". Soon afterwards, the reformist leaders Hu Yaobang and Deng Xiaoping began to rehabilitate citizens who had been labeled as capitalist roaders, bad elements and counter-revolutionaries. This sharp rise in political freedom led to the Democracy Wall movement, with some dissidents suggesting that the period of "feudal fascism" began much earlier than the Cultural Revolution. The movement grew to be such threatening to party rule that it was suppressed and reform proceeded more cautiously thereafter.

== See also ==
- Neo-feudalism
- Corporatism
- Fascist (insult)
