= Mango cult =

Veneration of mangoes in China under Mao

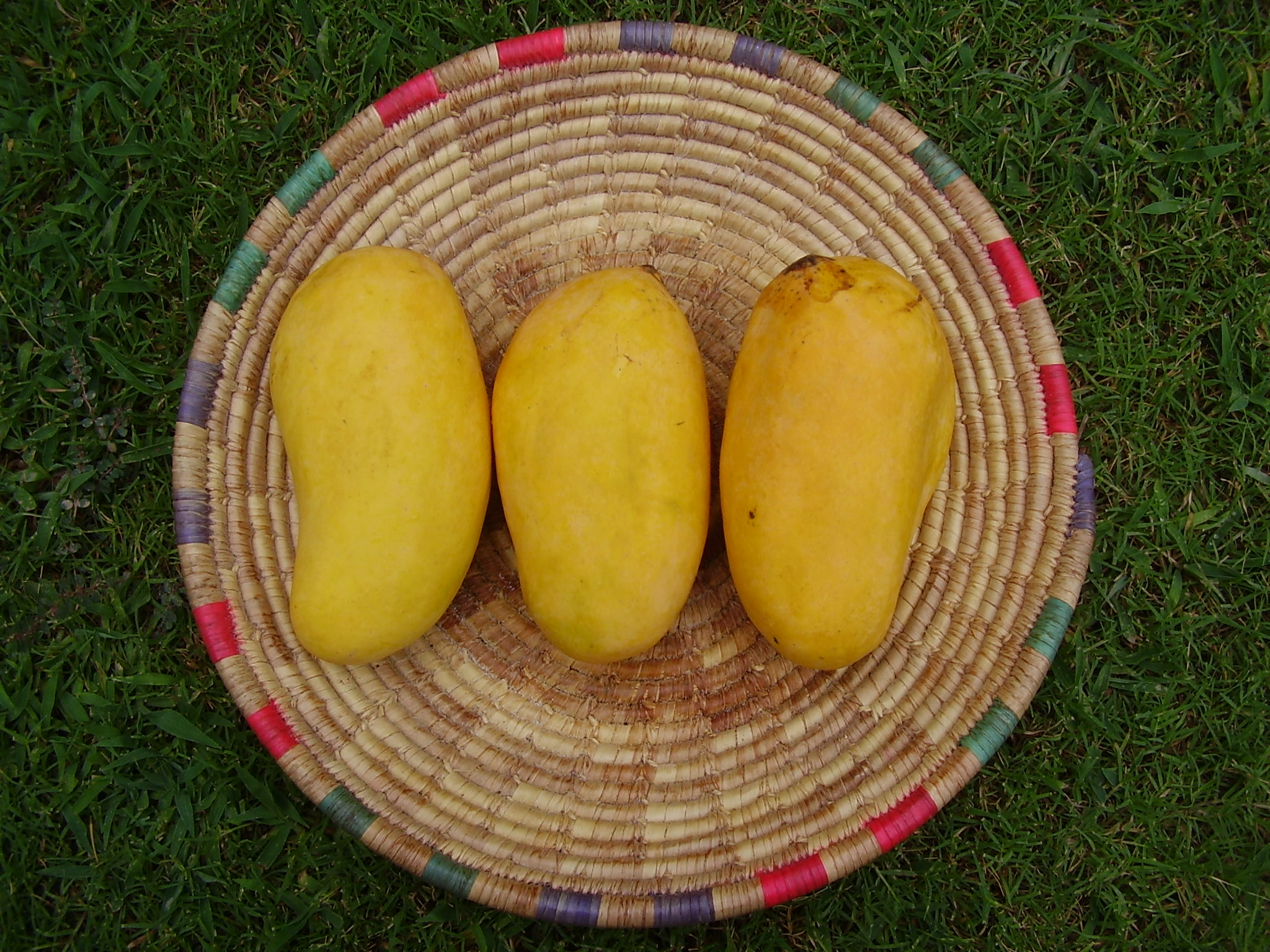
Sindhri mangoes

The mango cult (Chinese: 芒果崇拜; pinyin: Mángguǒ Chóngbài) was the veneration or worship of mangoes in Mainland China during the Cultural Revolution period. On August 5, 1968, Mao Zedong gave a box of Sindhri mangoes, given to him by the Pakistani Foreign Minister Mian Arshad Hussain, to the Worker-Peasant Mao Zedong Thought Propaganda Team stationed at Tsinghua University.

After this, mangoes became a symbol of Mao's affection. Instead of being eaten, the mangoes were preserved in formaldehyde, or sealed in wax for veneration. Mao's gift of mangoes to the workers and the rise of the mango craze coincided with a turn in the Cultural Revolution, as the working class began to lead it.

== History ==
In May 1966, Mao Zedong launched the Cultural Revolution in China. One by-product of the Cultural Revolution was the formation of various pro-Mao student groups, known as Red Guards, across the country. Though they shared the Maoist ideology, the Red Guards often had violent inter-group rivalries.

In the spring of 1968, the Hundred-Day War erupted at Tsinghua University. In it, two groups of Red Guards, the Jinggangshan Corps and the Fours, hurled spears, stones, and sulfuric acid at each other. On July 27, 1968, Mao sent 30,000 Beijing factory workers, who came to be known as the Worker-Peasant Mao Zedong Thought Propaganda Team, to stop the conflict. Half a dozen workers were killed and over 700 were wounded. This caused Mao to officially disband the Red Guards the next day.

On August 5, 1968, the Foreign Minister of Pakistan, Mian Arshad Hussain, visited Mao and gave him a box of Sindhri mangoes. A competing story of origin claims that the giver of the mangoes was Burmese. Mao gave them to the workers stationed at Tsinghua University. His refusal to eat the fruit himself was seen as a personal sacrifice for the benefit of the workers, and the workers believed that the mangoes were symbolic of Mao's gratefulness. The gift of the fruits coincided with the transfer of the Cultural Revolution's stewardship from China's intelligentsia to the working class.

Very few people in that region of China at the time knew what mangoes were, leading to many people being in awe of the fruit, and comparing them to the Peaches of Immortality from Chinese mythology. The original mangoes were preserved using chemicals, such as formaldehyde, and were displayed in various Chinese universities. Workers soon began to venerate wax models of mangoes and parade them around the country, punishing anyone who disrespected them as counterrevolutionaries. A giant float shaped like a basket of mangoes was paraded on October 1, 1968, during China's National Day Parade in Tiananmen Square.

Wax and plastic replicas of mangoes were in high demand. Various mango-themed products were sold, such as bed sheets, vanity stands, enamel trays and mugs, pencil cases, mango-scented soap, and mango-flavored cigarettes, often accompanied by patriotic slogans and images of Mao. A set of medallions was crafted to commemorate Mao's gift of the mangoes, and Mao badges were manufactured with the image of a mango under his face.

== Decline of the cult ==
After more than a year, the cult of the mango had declined significantly, and some people even began using wax mangoes as candles when the power went out. In 1974, Imelda Marcos, the First Lady of the Philippines, visited China with a box of mangoes as a gift. Mao's wife Jiang Qing tried to reignite the veneration of mangoes by giving the box to the workers once again. However, though the workers dutifully held a ceremony to honor the mangoes, the previous mango craze had already disappeared. Jiang Qing later directed a propaganda film called The Song of Mangoes. However, before the film was finished, Mao Zedong died, representing the loss of the revolutionary figurehead of the Cultural Revolution. Within a week of the film's release, Jiang Qing was arrested, and The Song of Mangoes was taken out of circulation. This marked the end of the mango cult. Mangoes are now common in China and are seen as an ordinary consumer good.

== See also ==
- Mao Zedong's cult of personality
- Loyalty dance
