= Hua Guofeng's cult of personality =

State-sponsored veneration of Hua Guofeng, considered a failed cult

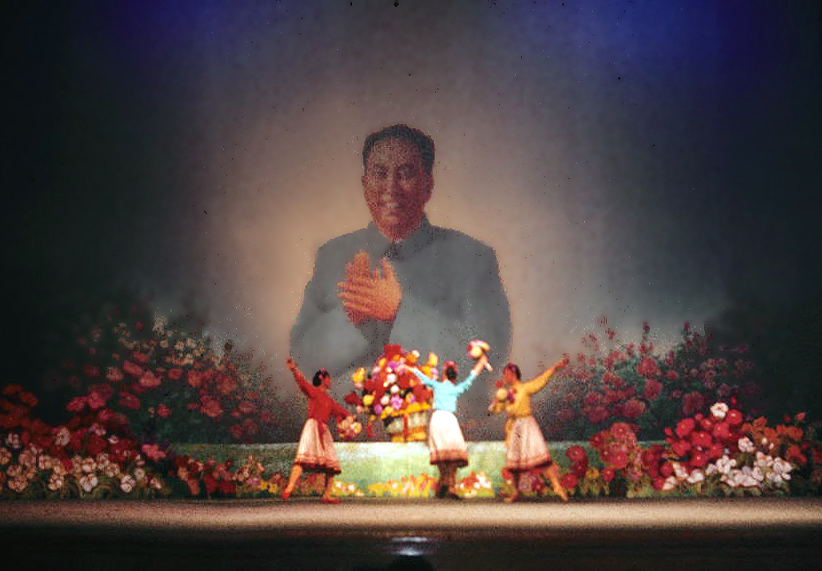
"With Flowers to Chairman Hua," a ballet dedicated to Hua Guofeng. Performed in Shanghai, 1978

Hua Guofeng's cult of personality was the attempted cult of personality of Hua Guofeng, who became the second Chairman of the Chinese Communist Party from 1976 until 1981, after the death of former chairman Mao Zedong. After succeeding Mao in 1976, Hua Guofeng attempted to establish a cult of personality around himself by closely associating himself with Mao's legacy. He adopted Mao's style, including his distinctive hairstyle, and often emulated Mao's public demeanor. State media and propaganda were employed extensively to project Hua as Mao's rightful successor. During the height of Hua's personality cult, the number of portraits and images of Hua even surpassed those of Mao.

With the rise of Deng Xiaoping, Hua became more and more unpopular, inside and outside the party. At the 3rd Plenary Session of the 11th Central Committee, Deng effectively took control over China, gradually replacing Hua as the paramount leader of China. In 1981, Hua was demoted to Vice Chairman of the Chinese Communist Party, and by 1982, he had faded into political obscurity as a member of the Central Committee, where he remained until his retirement in 2002. Hua Guofeng died on 20 August 2008 in Beijing, China.

== Appointment and political doctrine ==
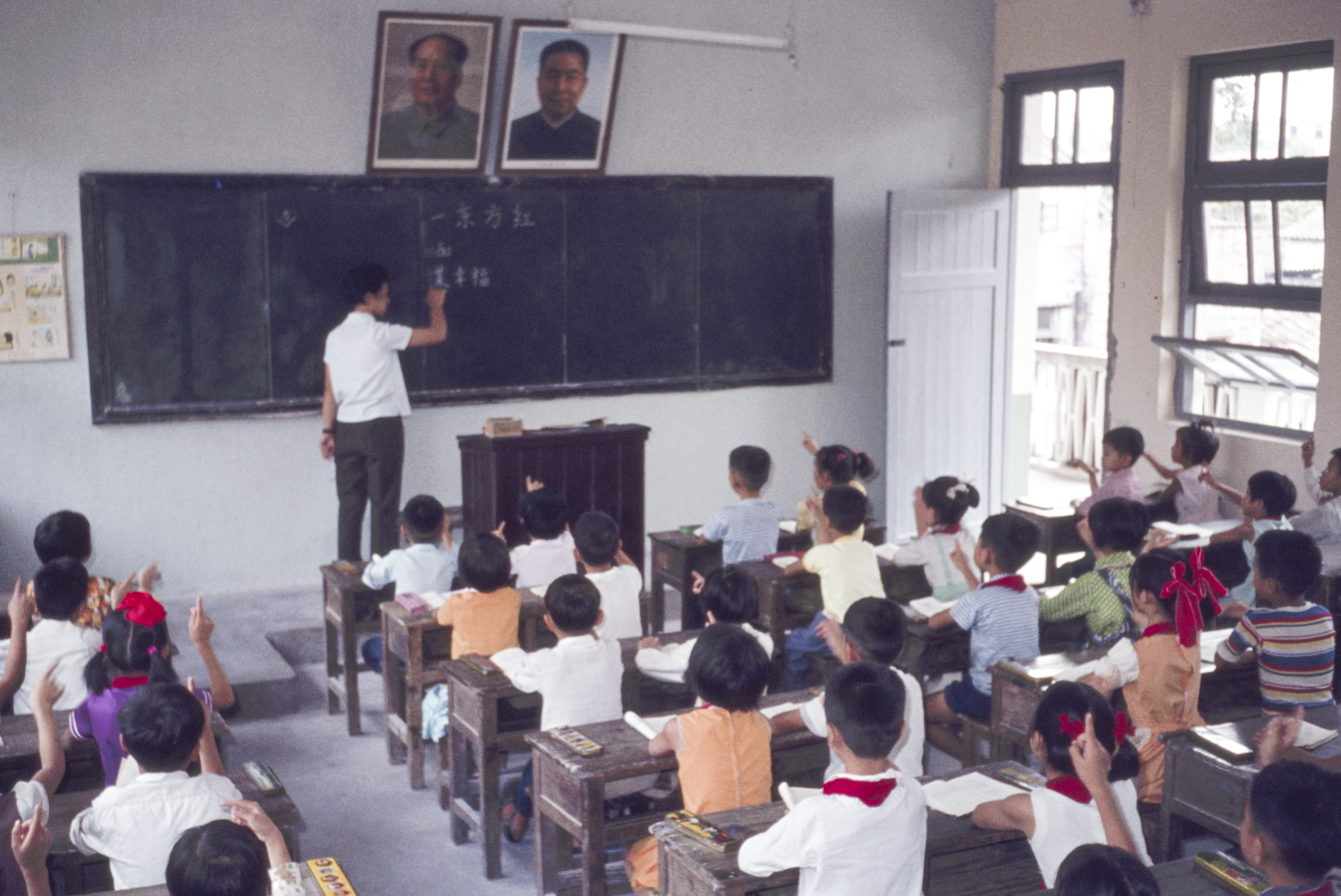
A primary class displaying Hua's portrait next to Mao's, 1978

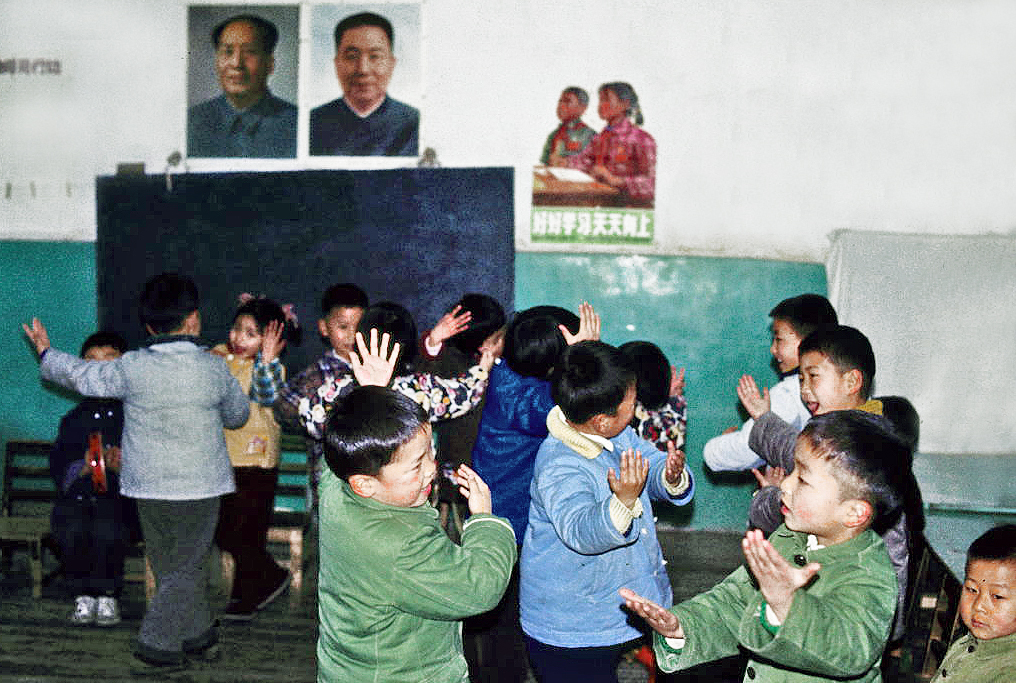
Children dancing in a kindergarten, Shanghai, 1978. On the wall, portraits of Mao Zedong and Hua Guofeng

When the founder of the People's Republic of China and first Chairman of the Chinese Communist Party, Mao Zedong, died in 1976 his newly appointed successor, Hua Guofeng, was relatively unknown to the public at the start of his rule. In late 1976, Hua Guofeng launched a nationwide campaign to criticize the Gang of Four after their purge and arrest and rehabilitated some of those punished during the Cultural Revolution, restoring over 4600 disgraced cadres between October 1976 and December 1978. Deng Xiaoping was also rehabilitated in July 1977, marking significant changes in the Central Committee's composition.

Hua famously stated; "We will resolutely uphold whatever policy decisions Chairman Mao made, and unswervingly follow whatever instructions Chairman Mao gave," later mockingly referred to as the "Two Whatevers (两个凡是)." Hua was criticized for his perceived blind obedience. He initiated the first National College Entrance Examination since the Cultural Revolution. In 1978, Hua played a key role in drafting a new state constitution, which aimed to restore some rule of law and planning mechanisms, though it retained some elements of Mao's continuous revolution theory.

== Building of a personality cult ==
Hua Guofeng attempted to establish a cult of personality by closely associating himself with Mao Zedong's legacy. He adopted Mao's style, including his distinctive hairstyle, and often emulated Mao's public demeanor. State media and propaganda were employed extensively to project Hua as Mao's rightful successor, positioning him as the new helmsman of the revolution.

Hua also leveraged Mao's supposed endorsement, prominently featuring the phrase "With you in charge, I'm at ease," which was attributed to Mao, to legitimize his leadership. This endorsement was heavily promoted to reinforce his authority and connection to Mao.

Additionally, Hua sought to embed his image into the daily lives of Chinese citizens. Schools, government offices, and public institutions were required to display his portrait alongside Mao's. He also revised the national anthem to incorporate Mao's name and the Communist Party, reflecting a shift towards a more ideologically driven tone.

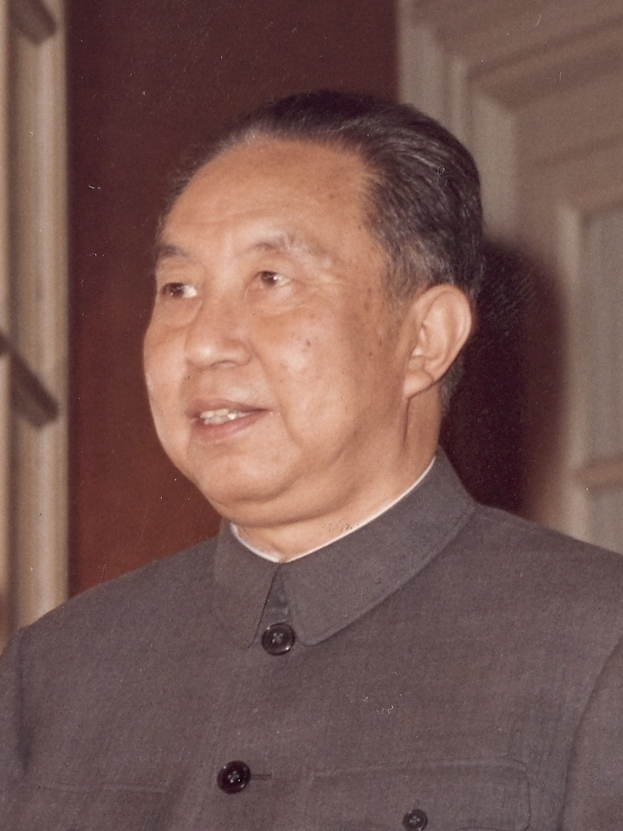
Hua in Rennes in April 1979. He had lost his position as paramount leader six months earlier.

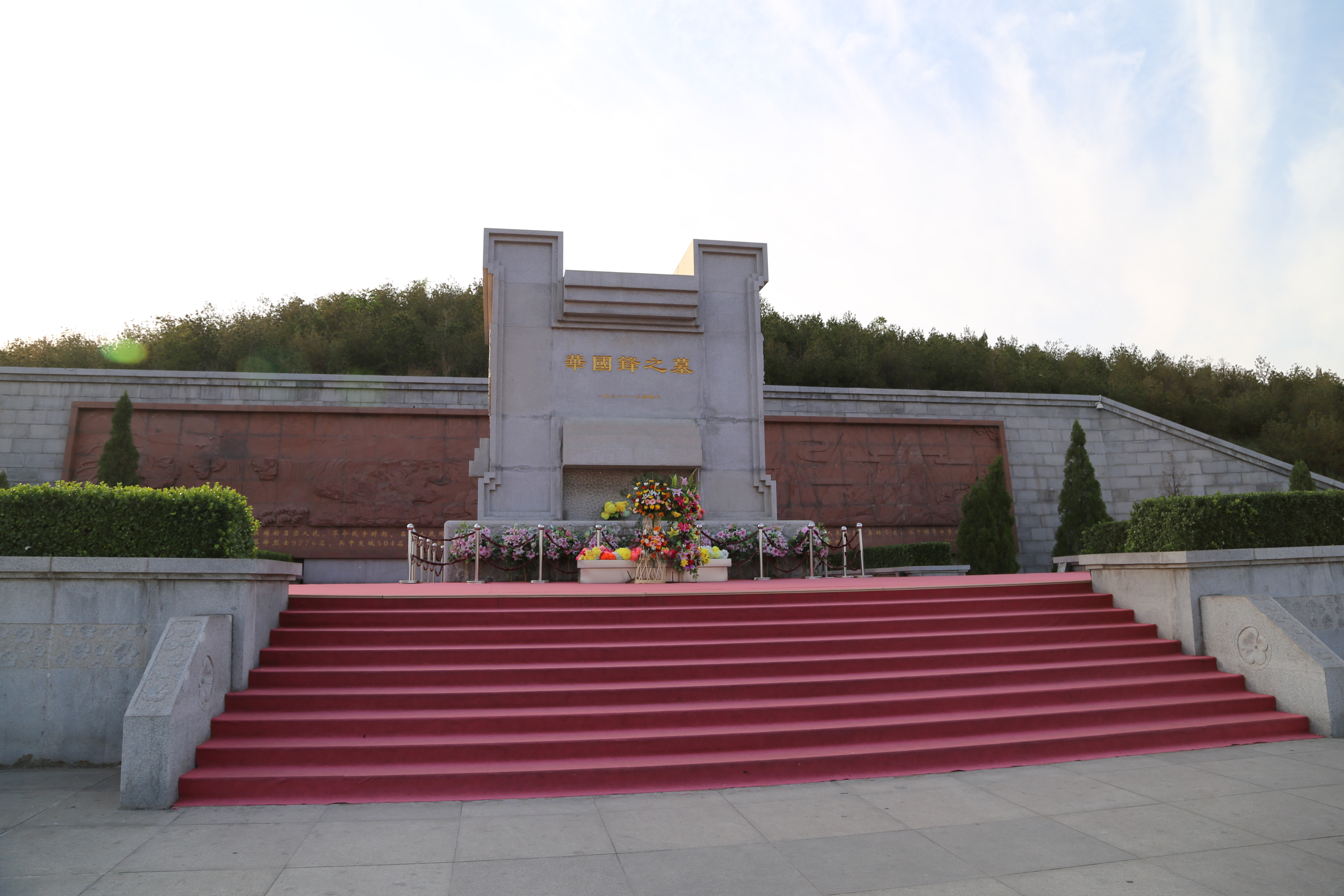
Tomb of Hua Guofeng in 2014

During the height of Hua's personality cult, the number of portraits and images of Hua even surpassed those of Mao, a significant shift in visual representation, as during this period Hua's likeness became more prevalent in public spaces, offices, and homes across China than Mao's. At this point in time Hua was exclusively referred to as the "Wise Leader Chairman Hua (英明领袖华主席)," a title that was prominently featured in the propaganda posters of the time.

== Failing cult and political ousting ==
Hua Guofeng's cult of personality ultimately failed due to several key factors. Firstly, his reliance on Maoist rhetoric and symbolism appeared increasingly outdated as China began to shift towards reform and modernization. Secondly, the cult of personality failed to resonate deeply with the public or within the Communist Party. Party officials were growing weary of the extreme cultism that characterized the Mao era, and Hua's attempts to establish his own cult of personality seemed out of touch with this new direction. The contradiction of Hua eliminating Jiang Qing, Mao's wife, while simultaneously aligning himself with Mao's legacy was another apparent factor that led to the failure of his personality cult.

The rise of Deng Xiaoping was pivotal in undermining Hua Guofeng's political position, and bringing an end to his personality cult. Rehabilitated in July 1977, Deng quickly gained influence within the Communist Party by championing economic reforms and advocating for China's opening to the world. His pragmatic approach and vision for modernization resonated strongly with both the party elite and the general public, causing support for Hua to wane. At the Third Plenary Session of the 11th Central Committee in December 1978, Deng effectively took control of the party by consolidating his power and marginalizing Hua, who was unofficially replaced by Deng as China's paramount leader in the session.

With Hua being replaced by Deng as the leader of China, his personality cult completely collapsed, most notably evidenced by the removal of most of his portraits. Hua's power then continued to decline after 1978. In June 1981, he was replaced as Chairman of the Chinese Communist Party by Hu Yaobang and was demoted to the position of junior Vice Chairman. This post was subsequently abolished in 1982, leaving him as an ordinary member of the Central Committee. At the 16th Party Congress in 2002, although Hua was listed as a delegate, he was notably absent, reportedly due to illness. He made a return at the 17th Congress in 2007. Hua Guofeng died on 20 August 2008 in Beijing, China.

== See also ==
- History of the People's Republic of China (1976–1989)
- List of cults of personality
- Mao Zedong's cult of personality
- Xi Jinping's cult of personality

== Bibliography ==
- MacFarquhar, Roderick; Schoenhals, Michael (2008-03-15). Mao's Last Revolution. Harvard University Press. ISBN 978-0-674-02748-0.
- Gewirtz, Julian (2022). Never Turn Back: China and the Forbidden History of the 1980s. Harvard University Press. ISBN 978-0-674-24184-8.
- Baum, Richard (1996-01-28). Burying Mao: Chinese Politics in the Age of Deng Xiaoping. Princeton University Press. ISBN 978-0-691-03637-3.
- Nakajima, Mineo (2002). 北京烈烈: 文化大革命とは何であったか [Beijing Fierce: What was the Cultural Revolution?] (in Japanese). Kodansha. ISBN 978-4-06-159547-7.
