= Social fascism =

Communist term for social democracy in early 1930s

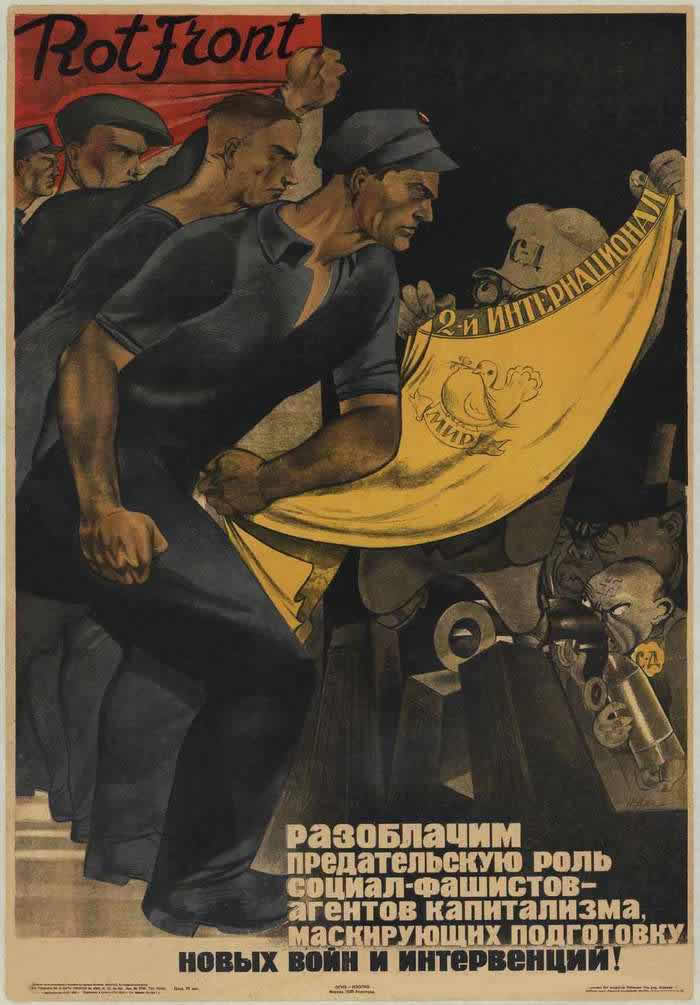
1932 Soviet propaganda poster denouncing "social fascism"

Social fascism was a term used by the Communist International (Comintern) that labeled social democracy as the "moderate wing of fascism", particularly on the basis of their shared interest in class collaboration. The theory was abandoned by the Comintern in 1933 after the victory of the Nazis in Germany and subsequent suppression of communists.

The Comintern argued that capitalism had entered a Third Period in which proletarian revolution was imminent, but could be prevented by social democrats and other fascist forces.

== Overview ==
Poster of the Portuguese MRPP of a rally on 12 October 1975 at Campo Pequeno, in Lisbon, commemorating a killed party member, whose slogan reads: "Neither Fascism, nor Social fascism. People's Government"

At the 6th World Congress of the Comintern in 1928, the end of capitalist stability and the beginning of the "Third Period" was proclaimed. The end of capitalism, accompanied with a working class revolution, was expected and social democracy was identified as the main enemy of the communists. The Comintern's theory had roots in Grigory Zinoviev, who used the term in an attempt to deflect the blame of German October's failure onto the social democrats. Joseph Stalin promoted the term and described fascism and social democracy as "twin brothers", arguing that fascism depends on the active support of social democracy and that social democracy depends on the active support of fascism. After it was declared at the Sixth Congress, the theory of social fascism became accepted by many in the world communist movement.

The new direction was closely linked to the internal politics of the Communist Party of the Soviet Union (CPSU). After a faction fight inside that party following the death of Vladimir Lenin in 1924, the victorious group around Stalin shifted decisively to the left by advocating the end of the mixed economy New Economic Policy and declaring an intensification of the class struggle inside the Soviet Union. An atmosphere of revolutionary fervour was created and saw any enemy of the ruling group around Stalin denounced as "wreckers" and "traitors", an attitude that was translated on to the international stage, where both social democrats and Communist dissidents were denounced as fascists.

Stalin stated in a speech in 1924:

Fascism is not only a military-technical category. Fascism is the bourgeoisie's fighting organisation that relies on the active support of Social-Democracy. Social-Democracy is objectively the moderate wing of fascism. There is no ground for assuming that the fighting organisation of the bourgeoisie can achieve decisive successes in battles, or in governing the country, without the active support of Social-Democracy. These organisations do not negate, but supplement each other. They are not antipodes, they are twins.

At the same time, under leadership of German Chancellor Hermann Müller the Social Democratic Party of Germany (SPD) agreed with anti-communist parties that Stalinists were fascists. That led to mutual hostility between social democrats and the Communist Party of Germany (KPD). These were additionally intensified in 1929 when Berlin's police, then under control of the SPD government, shot down Communist workers demonstrating on May Day in what became called Blutmai (Bloody May). That and the repressive legislation against the Communists that followed served as further evidence to Communists that social democrats were indeed "social fascists". In 1929, the KPD's paramilitary organisation, the Roter Frontkämpferbund ("Alliance of Red Front-Fighters"), was banned as extremist by the governing social democrats. A KPD resolution described the "social fascists" [social democrats] as the "main pillar of the dictatorship of Capital". In 1930, Kurt Schumacher of the SPD accused Communists of being "red-lacquered doppelgangers of the Nazis". In Prussia, the largest state of Germany, the KPD united with the Nazis in unsuccessful attempt to bring down the state government of SPD by means of a Landtag referendum.

After Adolf Hitler's Nazi Party came to power in Germany, both the KPD and the SPD was outlawed and thousands of members of both parties were arrested, including KPD leader Ernst Thälmann. Meanwhile, most SPD leaders had to flee in exile under Sopade. Those events made the Comintern do a complete turn on the question of alliance with social democrats and the theory of social fascism was largely abandoned. At the Seventh Congress of the Comintern in 1935, Georgi Dimitrov outlined the new policy of the popular front in his address "For the Unity of the Working Class Against Fascism". This popular front dissolved with the Molotov–Ribbentrop Pact. The American historian Theodore Draper argued that "the so-called theory of social fascism and the practice based on it constituted one of the chief factors contributing to the victory of German fascism in January 1933".

== Criticism of the term ==
=== By Trotsky ===
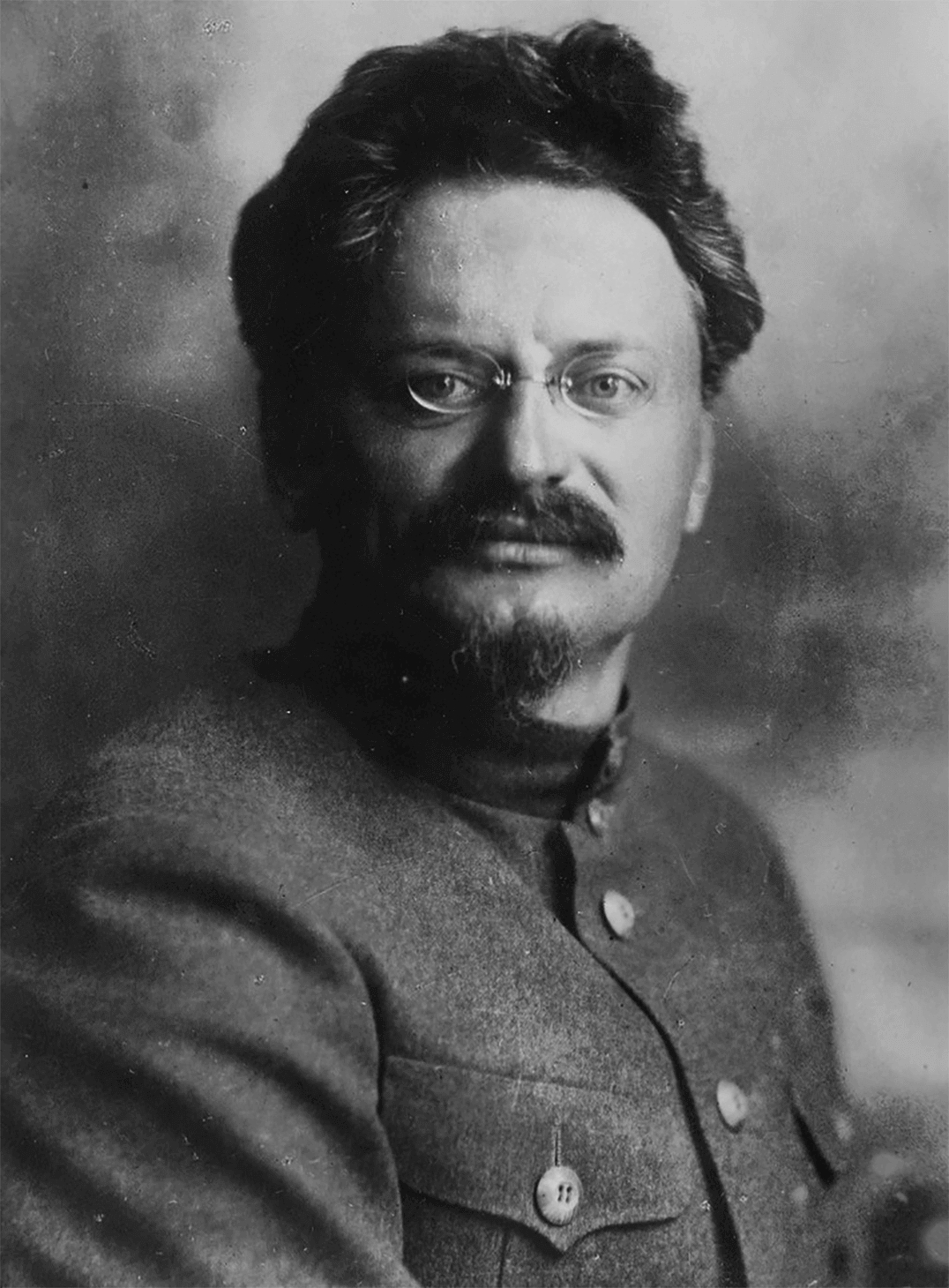
Leon Trotsky

Leon Trotsky argued against the accusations of "social fascism". In the March 1932 Bulletin of the Opposition, he declared: "Should fascism come to power, it will ride over your skulls and spines like a terrific tank. [...] And only a fighting unity with the Social Democratic workers can bring victory". However, Trotsky also wrote in the same essay that any co-operation with the social democrats was only tactical and temporary and that in the final analysis social democracy would have to be defeated and subverted by the revolutionary faction:

The front must now be directed against fascism. And this common front of direct struggle against fascism, embracing the entire proletariat, must be utilized in the struggle against the Social Democracy, directed as a flank attack, but no less effective for all that. [...] No common platform with the Social Democracy, or with the leaders of the German trade unions, no common publications, banners, placards! March separately, but strike together! Agree only how to strike, whom to strike, and when to strike! Such an agreement can be concluded even with the devil himself. [...] No retraction of our criticism of the Social Democracy. No forgetting of all that has been. The whole historical reckoning, including the reckoning for Karl Liebknecht and Rosa Luxemburg, will be presented at the proper time, just as the Russian Bolsheviks finally presented a general reckoning to the Mensheviks and Social Revolutionaries for the baiting, calumny, imprisonment and murder of workers, soldiers, and peasants.

=== Other historical criticism ===
In part of The Open Society And Its Enemies (1945), philosopher Karl Popper criticized what he saw as Communist inaction during the rise of fascism, stating that "there was never a 'communist danger' to the fascist conquest of power". Popper argued that some radical parties of the era welcomed or turned a blind eye to the weakening of democracy, or saw a dictatorship as a temporary stepping stone to a revolution.

According to this assertion, not much could be lost and something would be gained if that hidden dictatorship became an open one, apparent to all; for this could only bring the revolution nearer. [Communists] even hoped that a totalitarian dictatorship in Central Europe would speed up matters [...] Accordingly, the Communists did not fight when the fascists seized power. (Nobody expected the Social Democrats to fight). For the Communists were sure that the proletarian revolution was overdue and that the fascist interlude, necessary for its speeding up, could not last longer than a few months.

In 1969, the ex-communist historian Theodore Draper argued that the Communists who proposed the theory of social fascism, "were chiefly concerned with drawing a line of blood between themselves and all others to the 'right' of them, including the most 'left-wing' of the Social-Democrats."

== See also ==
- Accelerationism
- Fascist socialization
- Feudal fascism
- Gustav Noske
- National Bolshevik Party
- National Bolshevism
- National Party (Turkey)
- Red fascism
- Social corporatism
- Social imperialism
- Social patriotism
- Strasserism
- Walter Kolbenhoff
- Wilhelm Hoegner
