= Lingxiu (disambiguation) =

Lingxiu (simplified Chinese: 灵秀; traditional Chinese: 靈秀; pinyin: Língxiù) is a town of Shishi City, in the south of Fujian province, China.

Lingxiu (Chinese: 領袖 / 领袖) is also a reverential term for leader in Chinese. It may refer to:

- Chiang Kai-shek (1887-1975), leader of the Republic of China and the Kuomintang from 1928 to 1975
- Mao Zedong (1893-1976), Chairman of the Chinese Communist Party (1945-1976) and first paramount leader of the People's Republic of China (1949-1976)
- Hua Guofeng (1921-2008), Chairman of the Chinese Communist Party (1976-1981) and paramount leader (1976-1978)
- Xi Jinping (born 1953), General Secretary of the Chinese Communist Party and paramount leader since 2012
