= Loyalty dance =

Collective dance during the Cultural Revolution

The loyalty dance (Chinese: 忠字舞; pinyin: Zhōngzì wǔ; lit. 'loyalty character dance') was a collective dance usually performed in public places like plazas and squares, or at parades, during the Cultural Revolution of the People's Republic of China.

In the late 1960s, Chairman Mao's cult of personality reached new heights, with citizens performing the "loyalty dance" to express their loyalty to the leader.

== Characteristics ==
The loyalty dance was one of the main activities during the Cultural Revolution and was an integral part of Mao Zedong's cult of personality.

This simple dance did not involve much more than stretching one's arms from the heart to Mao's portrait, with movements originating from a folk dance popular in Xinjiang. It was frequently accompanied by revolutionary songs including "The East is Red" (东方红), "Beloved Chairman Mao" (敬愛的毛主席), "Golden Hill of Beijing" (北京的金山上), "Sailing the Seas Depends on the Helmsman" (大海航行靠舵手), or songs featuring quotations from Chairman Mao. Some song lyrics used the quote "No matter how close our parents are to us, they are not as close as our relationship with Mao", which was used to inspire a spirit of collective worship.

A notable slogan related to the loyalty dance was the "Three Loyalties" (三忠于): loyalty to Chairman Mao; loyalty to Mao Zedong Thought; loyalty to Chairman Mao's revolutionary line. The loyalty dance was an everyday fixture of life in the late 1960s, practiced in order to display one's lifelong devotion to Mao Zedong and exercise total discipline.

== History ==
The loyalty dance appeared soon after the Cultural Revolution started in 1966. In 1968, "Three Loyalties" activities reached a climax in various areas. Model operas were sung and the loyalty dance were performed widely all over the country.

People from various backgrounds, including miners, office workers, toddlers, and even elderly women with bound feet, were expected to perform this dance. The movements were always directed toward the sky, symbolizing respect for Mao.

After the 9th National Congress of the Chinese Communist Party in April 1969, the dance gradually declined in popularity. By the 1970s it was rarely seen, and as the Cultural Revolution came to an end in 1976, it rapidly disappeared.

== See also ==
- Mao Zedong's cult of personality
- Mango cult
