= Mao Zedong Thought Propaganda Teams =

Cultural Revolution organisations in China

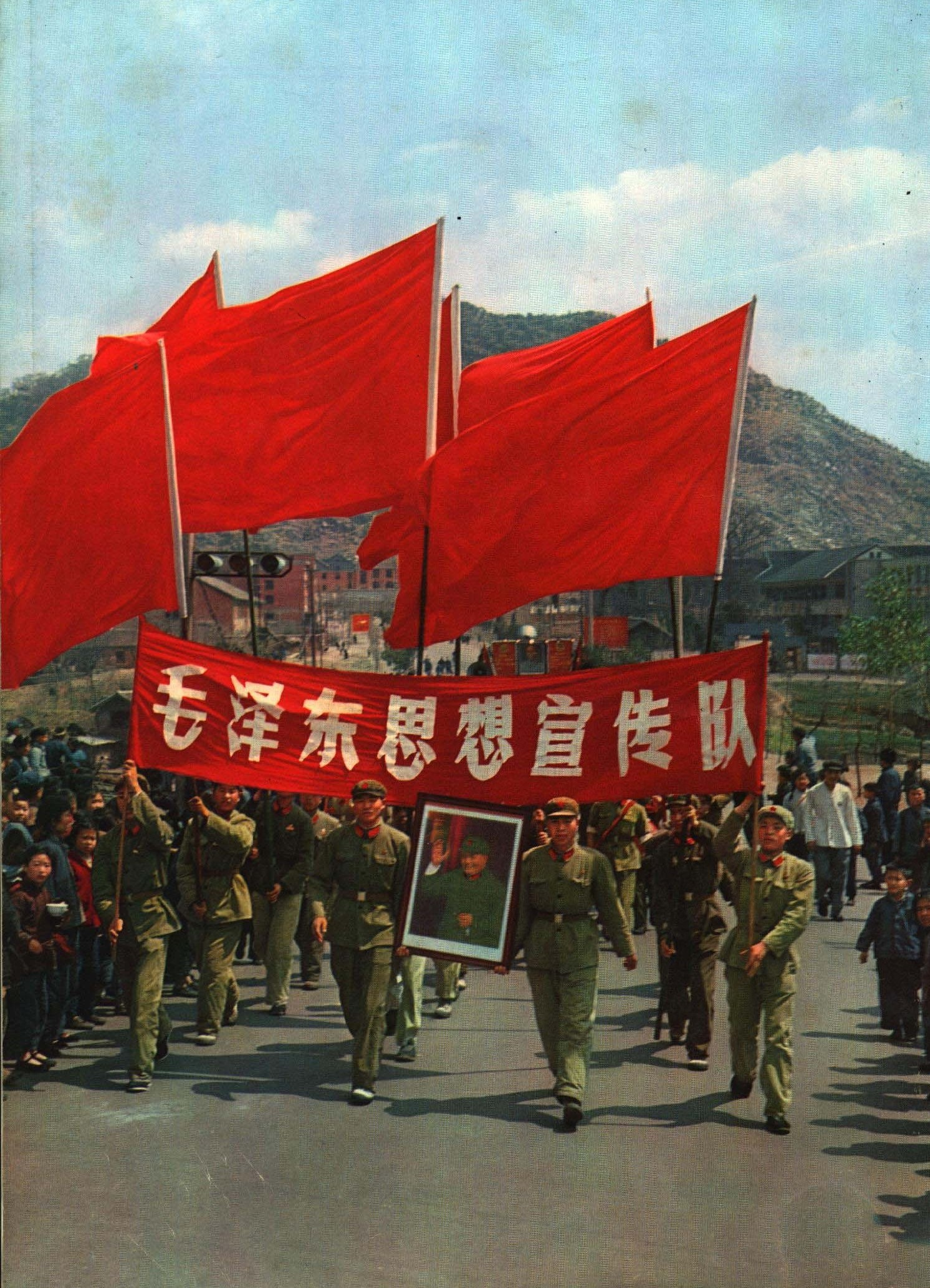
Mao Zedong Thought Propaganda Team

Mao Zedong Thought Propaganda Teams (Chinese: 毛泽东思想宣传队) were organisations established across the People's Republic of China (PRC) during the Cultural Revolution, mainly from the summer of 1968 onward. They were sent into the sectors of education, culture, and even into Party and state organs, with the primary purpose of bringing these work units under control and maintaining basic order. Depending on the background of their members – workers, soldiers or peasants – these teams were commonly referred to as "worker propaganda teams", "military propaganda teams" and "peasant propaganda teams". Among them, the extent, depth and duration of the military's intervention in national and local government affairs, as well as the number of military personnel involved, were unprecedented in scope in the history of the PRC and the PLA. (Note: This assessment refers specifically to developments in the history of the People's Republic of China since 1949 and in the history of the People's Liberation Army since 1927.) After the propaganda teams entered these institutions, large-scale local armed clashes came to an end, and the Red Guard organisations, made up mainly of students, rapidly declined. Subsequently, worker and military propaganda teams directly participated in political purges such as the campaign to "cleanse class ranks", the One Strike-Three Anti Campaign, and the investigation of the so-called "May 16 counter-revolutionary group". Many members of rebel factions who had been active in the early Cultural Revolution were purged or suppressed during this process.

== Worker Mao Zedong Thought Propaganda Teams ==
=== Definition ===
The worker Mao Zedong Thought propaganda team (Chinese: 工人毛泽东思想宣传队), commonly abbreviated as worker propaganda team or gongxuandui (工宣队), was a Mao Zedong Thought propaganda team composed of workers. The abbreviation "gongxuandui" was used in official reports but was even more common in everyday speech. The working class was described as being sent to manage or "occupy" the "superstructure" – universities, middle schools, primary schools, as well as research and cultural institutions. Apart from the social composition of its members, the form and content of the worker propaganda teams were similar to the "work teams" sent out in the early phase of the Cultural Revolution, but the authority they wielded was even greater.

=== History ===
In the summer of 1968, most provinces in China had completed the "seizure of power" and set up revolutionary committees. However, armed clashes between rival factions in many localities continued to undermine political stability and obstruct the restoration of normal social order and economic production. The Central Committee of the Chinese Communist Party (CCP) issued the "7 July" and "24 July" notices, ordering the disbanding of armed groups, the dismantling of fortifications, strongholds, and checkpoints, and the surrender of firearms and ammunition. At the same time, Mao dispatched worker propaganda teams to universities and secondary schools where armed struggle was particularly severe, in an attempt to halt violence at its source and to unify and mediate between rival Red Guard organisations on campus.

On 27 July 1968, more than 30,000 workers from over 60 factories in Beijing formed the "Capital Workers Mao Zedong Thought Propaganda Team". They entered Tsinghua University, where the "Hundred-Day Armed Conflict" had erupted, in an attempt to seize control of the university. They were met with violent resistance from Tsinghua Red Guards, in what became known as the "27 July Incident". On 28 July, Mao convened an emergency meeting with the five major leaders of the capital's Red Guards – Nie Yuanzi, Kuai Dafu, Tan Houlan, Han Aijing and Wang Dabing – delivering a tough speech on stopping armed clashes in universities and sending worker propaganda teams into Tsinghua and other major Beijing campuses. Some scholars argue that while there was indeed a worker component in the Tsinghua worker propaganda team, its leadership and many of its key members actually came from cadres of the Central Guard Regiment close to Mao himself.

On 5 August 1968, Mao passed a gift of mangoes he had received from foreign guests on to the Tsinghua worker propaganda team as a sign of support, triggering a nationwide wave of "mango worship". On 15 August, Mao and Lin Biao received representatives of the worker propaganda team stationed at Tsinghua University. On 25 August, the Central Committee of the CCP, the State Council, the Central Military Commission and the Central Cultural Revolution Group jointly issued the "Notice on Dispatching Worker Propaganda Teams to Take Up Residence in Schools", giving them strong political backing. On the same day, the journal Red Flag published a signed article by Yao Wenyuan, "The Working Class Must Exercise Leadership in Everything", approved by Mao and presenting his latest instructions.

To realise the proletarian educational revolution, the leadership of the working class is indispensable, and the participation of the working masses is indispensable. They must cooperate with the soldiers of the People's Liberation Army and, together with those students, teachers and workers in the schools who are determined to carry the proletarian educational revolution through to the end, practise the "triple alliance" in revolution. Worker propaganda teams should remain in the schools for the long term, taking part in all tasks of struggle–criticism–transformation (dou, pi, gai) and providing permanent leadership to the schools. In the countryside, schools should be run by the working class's most reliable allies – the poor and lower-middle peasants.

After this, the slogan "the working class must lead everything" reached its peak, and the dispatch of worker propaganda teams expanded rapidly nationwide. Many teams were sent not only to universities, secondary schools, and primary schools, but also into the press, publishing, literature, and the arts, and even into Party and state organs at all levels, where they held Party and government leadership posts and exercised substantial power. By the end of August 1968, worker propaganda teams had been stationed in all 59 colleges and universities in Beijing. Between 5 and 12 September, more than 31,000 industrial workers in Shanghai entered 513 middle schools and 1,249 primary schools across ten districts; each middle school had on average 50 workers, and more than 5,700 retired industrial workers joined the teams entering primary schools. According to statistics from the Shanghai Federation of Trade Unions in 1974, there were 10,713 members of worker propaganda teams citywide; 4,142 of them were "integrated" into Party committees or revolutionary committees as secretaries, committee members, or directors, including 189 who joined Party standing committees.

=== Impact ===
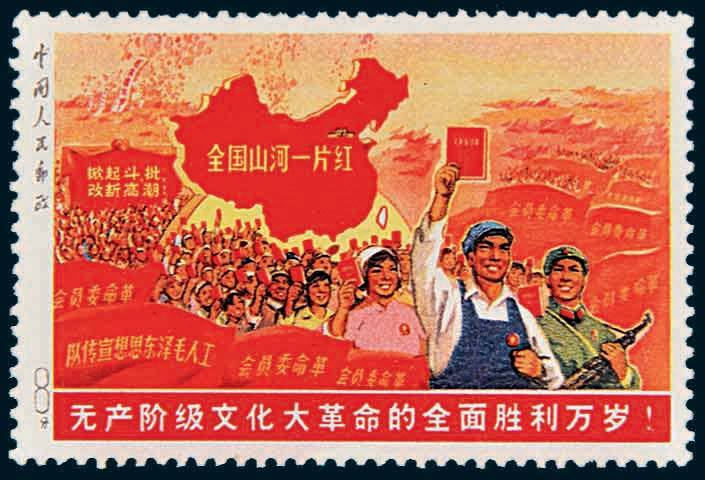
A Cultural Revolution postage stamp (October 1968) featuring revolutionary committees, worker propaganda teams and the slogan "struggle, criticism and transformation".

After worker and military propaganda teams entered schools, they organised "Mao Zedong Thought study classes" to promote the great alliance of opposing mass organisations; dismantled armed fortifications and collected weapons; and participated in the work of school Party branches and revolutionary committees, leading the "educational revolution" and taking part in lesson preparation and teaching. This facilitated closer links between factories and schools and the running of schools with their "doors open to society". At the same time, worker and military propaganda teams led large-scale campaigns of "great criticism", and directly participated in or led the campaigns to cleanse class ranks, the One Strike-Three Anti Campaign and the investigation of the "May 16" group, as well as readjusting revolutionary committees and rectifying Party organisations as part of the broader tasks of "struggle, criticism and transformation".

Once the worker and military propaganda teams moved into schools, Red Guard and rebel organisations quickly declined, and many rebel activists were subjected to purge and retaliation. Some studies argue that these measures helped resolve factional conflicts and bring an end to chaos in certain areas. At the same time, there is a view that Mao's attitude toward the Red Guards evolved from initial support and utilisation, through suspicion and suppression, to eventual repudiation and abandonment of the rebel Red Guards. Critics also note that worker and military propaganda teams still implemented a left-leaning political line. Lacking familiarity with education and the professional work of the units they entered, and with generally low educational levels themselves, they were often unable to integrate into or effectively lead school work. They became a power structure detached from the units' actual operations, fell into existing conflicts, and, in some cases, became a new source and component of contradictions, allowing disorder to persist in different forms.

== People's Liberation Army Mao Zedong Thought Propaganda Teams ==
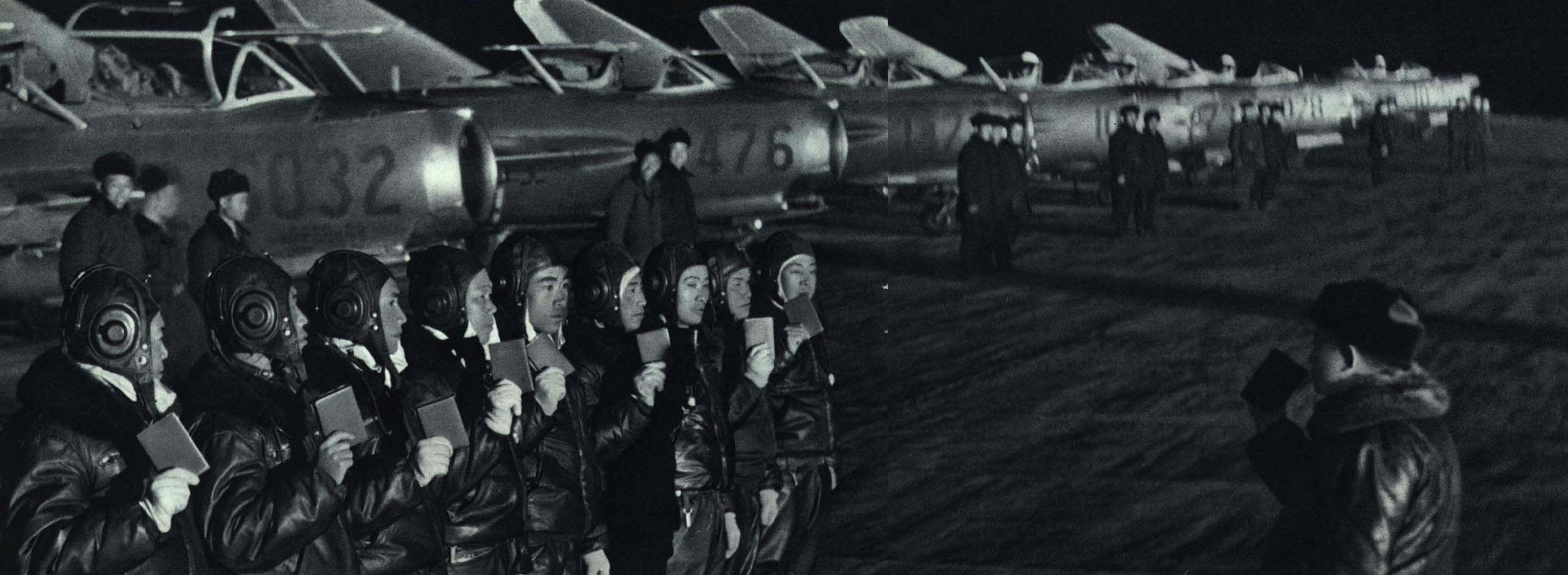
A unit of the PLAAF during the Cultural Revolution in 1967, with soldiers holding the Quotations from Chairman Mao.

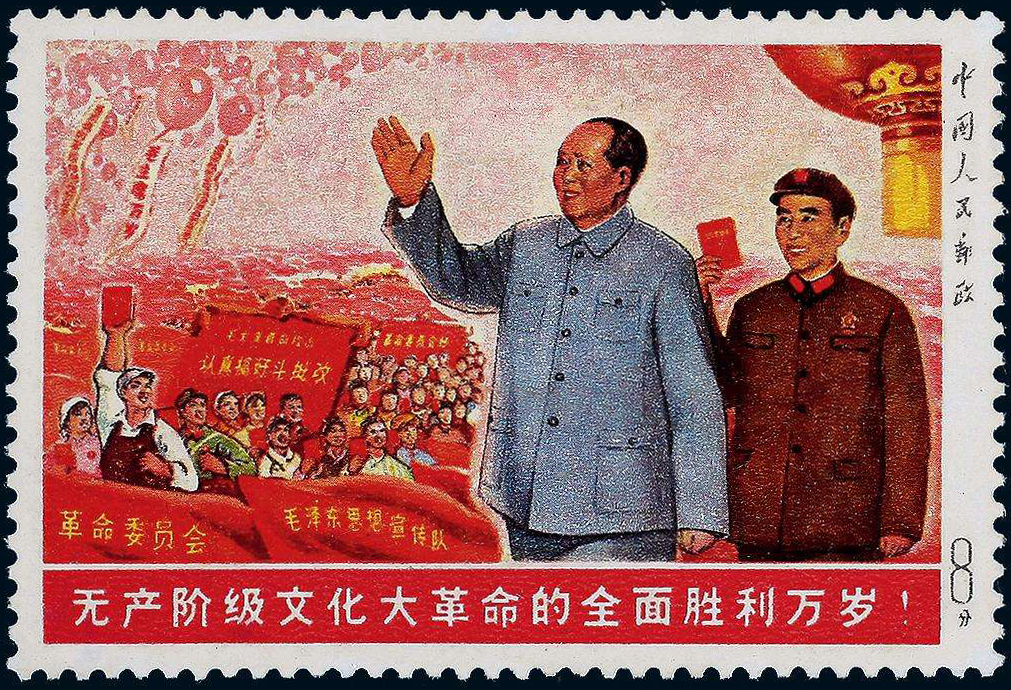
A Cultural Revolution stamp from October 1968 depicting Mao Zedong, Lin Biao, revolutionary committees, Mao Zedong Thought propaganda teams and the slogan "struggle, criticism and transformation".

The People's Liberation Army Mao Zedong Thought propaganda teams, abbreviated as military propaganda teams, were propaganda teams made up of personnel from the People's Liberation Army (PLA). As early as January 1967, at the outset of the "seizure of power", the CCP Central Committee, the State Council, the Central Military Commission and the Central Cultural Revolution Group issued the "Decision on the People's Liberation Army Resolutely Supporting the Revolutionary Leftist Masses", formally bringing the PLA into local Cultural Revolution struggles. In March 1967, the Central Military Commission issued the "Decision on Concentrating Forces on the Tasks of Support-the-Left, Support-the-Army, Support-the-Peasants, Support-the-Workers, Military Control and Military Training", known collectively as the "Three Supports and Two Military Tasks". According to Mao's instructions, the core of "Three Supports and Two Military Tasks" was "supporting the Left", that is, backing the local "revolutionary left". From September of the same year, this "supporting the Left" in practice shifted to supporting mass organisations on both sides, promoting the "great revolutionary alliance" of different factions in various regions and departments.

From 1968 onward, PLA personnel often carried out tasks of military training and military control under the name of "military propaganda teams". Between April and August 1968, the CCP's Propaganda Department, United Front Work Department, International Liaison Department and the Central Investigation Department all came under military control, while the Central Organisation Department, which played a core role in CCP personnel management, was effectively led by military officers. From 1967 to 1969, the system of military propaganda teams or military control became a widely used method for handling or resolving mass organisations and mass movements.

The "Three Supports and Two Military Tasks" continued until August 1972, roughly a year after Lin Biao's death in the "9–13 Incident". Over the course of this work, more than 2.8 million PLA personnel in total left their regular military posts to participate in local affairs. The breadth, scale, size, and duration of this intervention were unprecedented in the history of the People's Liberation Army, and the extent of the military's involvement in national and local government affairs was likewise without precedent in the history of the People's Republic of China. On the one hand, military involvement helped maintain a certain degree of social stability and reduced losses of agricultural and industrial output and of lives and property; on the other hand, it drew the PLA deeply into the political whirlpool of the Cultural Revolution, damaging its own ideological, organisational, disciplinary and institutional development.

== Peasant Mao Zedong Thought Propaganda Teams ==
The peasant Mao Zedong Thought propaganda teams – or "poor and lower-middle peasant Mao Zedong Thought propaganda teams", commonly abbreviated as peasant propaganda teams – were teams made up of people's commune poor and lower-middle peasants. In areas far from the cities, where there were few industrial workers, these teams played a role similar to worker propaganda teams.

== Later developments and evaluation ==
After the end of the Cultural Revolution, on 19 September 1977, Deng Xiaoping raised the need to "bring order out of chaos" in a talk with officials from the Ministry of Education. In that talk he stated:

The issue of worker propaganda teams must be resolved; they themselves do not feel at ease staying in the schools. As for those who "supported the Left" on behalf of the army, without exception they must all be withdrawn. If these issues in the schools are not settled, quarreling will go on without end.

On 6 November of the same year, the CCP Central Committee forwarded a report by the Ministry of Education Party group, "On the Question of Worker Propaganda Teams", after which worker propaganda teams stationed in universities, middle schools, and primary schools across the country were gradually withdrawn. In 1984, during renewed political criticism of worker and military propaganda teams, an official commentary held that:

In the schools, the "worker propaganda teams" and "military propaganda teams" shouted every day that the working class must "lead everything", but in reality it was they themselves who "led everything". They set up a false opposition between working-class leadership and Party leadership, between the working class and the intellectuals, and between factories and schools. In essence they violated the interests of the working class. "Worker propaganda teams" and "military propaganda teams" became "special personages" standing above the Party and the masses; they arbitrarily persecuted intellectuals, disrupted teaching and research, destroyed experimental equipment, and turned institutions of higher learning into "base camps" for ruthless struggle against "capitalist roaders" and for persecuting intellectuals.

Previously, during the Cultural Revolution, worker propaganda teams at Tsinghua University continually stressed that the "educational revolution" was a political revolution, and that "building the school on politics" was the soul of the proletarian educational revolution, resolving the questions of who education should serve and what kind of people it should cultivate. Professor Tang Shaojie of Tsinghua University has argued that "the essence of the 'educational revolution' was obscurantism. Its consequences were the suffocation of the spirit, the shackling of thought, the strangling of education, and the destruction of teaching – a great regression in education, even a great counter-revolution in civilisation itself. The so-called 'educational revolution' was in fact anti-education." Chen Zhao similarly wrote: "Mao Zedong sent groups of workers and soldiers into the major ministries of the State Council, into provincial Party committees, into the most prestigious universities, into factories, enterprises and the countryside, to issue orders and act as masters. Where was there any trace at all of the rule of law in this? ... Allowing a mere section chief (Chi Qun) and a confidential secretary (Xie Jingyi) to take charge of China's two top universities and to move large numbers of universities to remote mountain ravines – all of this clearly bore the mark of Mao's disdain for education and hostility to intellectuals. Criticising these policies is an indispensable part of thoroughly repudiating the Cultural Revolution".
