= Chairman of the China Securities Regulatory Commission =

Chairman of China Securities Regulatory Commission
- 中国证券监督管理委员会主席
- National Emblem of China

- Flag of China

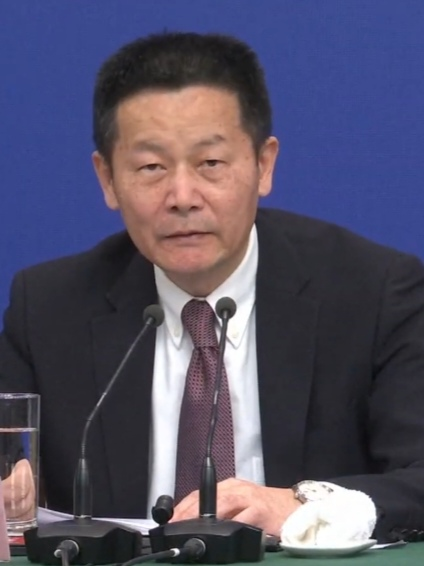
- Incumbent; Wu Qing since 7 February 2024
- China Securities Regulatory Commission
- Style: Chairman
- Status: Provincial and ministerial-level official
- Reports to: Director of the Central Financial Commission Office, Premier
- Residence: Beijing
- Nominator: Premier of China
- Appointer: President of China on the approval of the NPC or its Standing Committee
- Inaugural holder: Liu Hongru
- Formation: October 1992
- Deputy: Vice Chairman
- Website: www.csrc.gov.cn

The Chairman of the China Securities Regulatory Commission (CSRC) (Chinese: 中国证券监督管理委员会主席) is the highest-ranking official in the China Securities Regulatory Commission, the principal regulator of the securities and futures markets in the People's Republic of China.

== Appointment and authority ==
Appointed by the State Council of China, the Chairman holds ministerial rank and is responsible for formulating and enforcing regulations, supervising securities exchanges, protecting investor interests, and maintaining market order and transparency in China’s rapidly evolving financial sector.

The chairman is the public face of China's securities regulation, and plays a key role in steering capital market reforms, managing systemic risk, and aligning financial development with broader state economic goals. The position is considered one of the most influential in China's financial bureaucracy, often held by technocrats with extensive experience in economics, finance, or Party governance.

== Collaboration and visibility ==
The Chairman works closely with other regulatory bodies such as the People's Bank of China (PBoC), the China Banking and Insurance Regulatory Commission and the Ministry of Finance (China), and reports to the Financial Stability and Development Committee under the State Council.

The role has gained increased visibility in recent years amid China's efforts to deepen capital market liberalization, tighten corporate disclosure standards, and open its markets to foreign investors, while maintaining Party control over financial risks.

The current chairman is Wu Qing.

== List of chairman ==
=== People's Republic of China ===
No.	Officeholder	Term of office		Party
No.	Officeholder	Took office	Left office	Party
Chairman of the China Securities Regulatory Commission
1	Liu Hongru	October 1992	March 1995	Chinese Communist Party
2	Zhou Daojing	1995年3月	1997年7月	Chinese Communist Party
3	Zhou Zhengqing	1997年5月	2000年2月	Chinese Communist Party
4	Zhou Xiaochuan	2000年2月	2002年12	Chinese Communist Party
5	Shang Fulin	2002年12月	2011年10月	Chinese Communist Party
6	Guo Shuqing	2011年10月29日	2013年3月17日	Chinese Communist Party
7	Xiao Gang	2013年3月18日	2016年2月20日	Chinese Communist Party
8	Liu Shiyu	2016年2月20日	2019年1月26日	Chinese Communist Party
9	Yi Huiman	2019年1月	2024年2月	Chinese Communist Party
10	Wu Qing	February 7, 2024	Incumbent	Chinese Communist Party
