= Financial News (China) =

State-run newspaper publishing

Financial News (金融时报)
- Type: Daily newspaper
- Format: Major newspaper
- Owner: People's Bank of China
- Publisher: Financial News (China)
- President: Xing Zaozhong (邢早忠)
- Editor: Mei Guohui (梅国辉)
- Founded: 1 May 1987
- Language: Simplified Chinese
- Headquarters: 18th–22nd Floors, Building D, No. 18, Zhongguancun South Street, Haidian District, Beijing
- Price: RMB 1.50
- Website: https://www.cnfin.com/ (or: www.financialnews.com.cn/ )

Financial News (China) (simplified Chinese: 金融时报; traditional Chinese: 金融時報; pinyin: Jīnróng Shíbào), or Financial Times (China), is a state-run daily newspaper in China that specializes in financial and economic reporting. It is published under the supervision of the People’s Bank of China and serves as an authoritative source of information on monetary policy, banking regulation, and macroeconomic developments. Financial News is listed in the "2017 National Top 100 Newspapers and Periodicals" and the "2024 Chinese Newspapers with High Academic Influence".

== History ==
The Financial News was established in 1987 as the official newspaper of the People’s Bank of China. It was jointly funded by eight banks: People's Bank of China, the Industrial and Commercial Bank of China, the Agricultural Bank of China, the Bank of China, the China Construction Bank, the People's Insurance Company of China, the Bank of Communications, and China CITIC Bank. It was supervised by the People's Bank of China and was the first news media established in China after the Reform and opening up, using a shareholding system. Deng Xiaoping inscribed the name of the newspaper.

Financial Times was initially published twice a week. It became a three-day publication in 1988, a four-day publication in 1989, a six-day publication in 1991, and a daily newspaper in 1992.

In 1994, the newspaper expanded from a four-page broadsheet to an eight-page broadsheet. In 1999, it expanded to twelve pages.

On October 28, 2006, the first board of directors of the Financial News Press was established. The council comprises 21 member units: the People's Bank of China, the China Banking Regulatory Commission, the China Securities Regulatory Commission, the China Insurance Regulatory Commission, the China Development Bank, the Export-Import Bank of China, the Agricultural Development Bank of China, the Industrial and Commercial Bank of China, the Agricultural Bank of China, the Bank of China, the China Construction Bank, the Bank of Communications, China Everbright Group, China CITIC Bank, PICC Group, China Life Insurance Company, China Cinda Asset Management Corporation, Bank of Beijing, China Banknote Printing and Minting Corporation, China Gold Coin Corporation, and the Financial News (China).

In 2018, the newspaper was included in the year 2017 list of the top 100 newspapers in China.

In 2023, Financial News won a third prize at the 33rd China News Awards.

In 2024, Financial News was selected as one of the "2024 Chinese Newspapers with High Academic Influence" by CNKI.

== Current status ==
The mission of Financial News is to disseminate government financial policies, report on reforms in the financial sector, and guide public opinion on economic matters. Over time, Financial News has expanded its coverage to include banking, securities, insurance, and international financial developments.

Financial News is the only media authorized by the People's Bank of China and the State Administration of Foreign Exchange to publish financial statistics, and is a key information disclosure media designated by the China Banking Regulatory Commission, the China Securities Regulatory Commission, and the China Insurance Regulatory Commission.

Financial News currently owns the Shanghai Financial News, the China Financier magazine, Beijing Jinshi Century Advertising Company, and Shanghai Shangjin Advertising Company.

Financial News is published Monday through Saturday, with 12 broadsheet pages. It has 15 printing locations across the country and is printed and distributed simultaneously at home and abroad.

Headquarters Address: 18-22/F, Building D, No. 18, Zhongguancun South Street, Haidian District, Beijing.

== See also ==
- People’s Bank of China
- Caixin Media
- China Securities Journal
