= Guo Shuqing =

Chinese politician, banker, and financial regulator

- 郭树清; Kuo Shu-ching
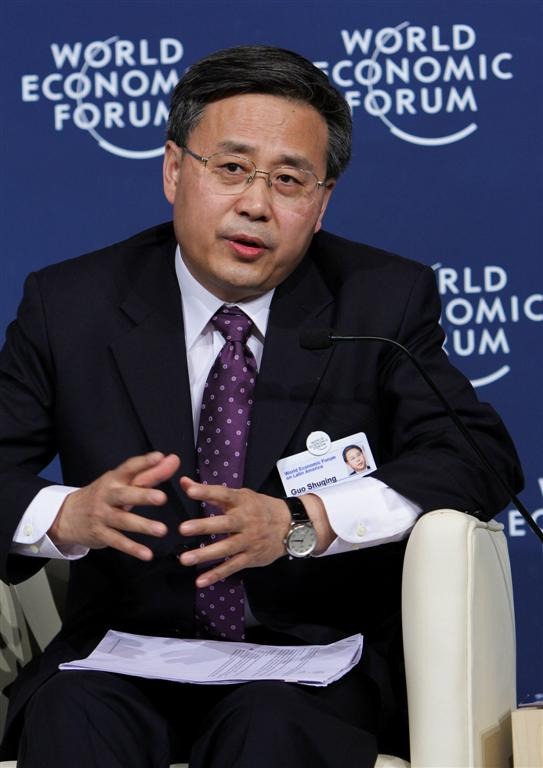
- Guo Shuqing at 2008 World Economic Forum on Latin America

Chairman of China Banking and Insurance Regulatory Commission
- In office 21 March 2018 – 18 May 2023
- Premier: Li Keqiang; Li Qiang
- Preceded by: Office established (Himself as Chairman of China Banking Regulatory Commission; Xiang Junbo as Chairman of China Insurance Regulatory Commission)
- Succeeded by: Office abolished (Li Yunze as Director of National Administration of Financial Regulation)

Chairman of China Banking Regulatory Commission
- In office 24 February 2017 – 17 March 2018
- Premier: Li Keqiang
- Preceded by: Shang Fulin
- Succeeded by: Office abolished (Himself as Chairman of China Banking and Insurance Regulatory Commission)

Governor of Shandong
- In office 5 June 2013 – 24 February 2017
- Party Secretary: Jiang Yikang
- Preceded by: Jiang Daming
- Succeeded by: Gong Zheng

Chairman of China Securities Regulatory Commission
- In office 29 October 2011 – 17 March 2013
- Premier: Wen Jiabao
- Preceded by: Shang Fulin
- Succeeded by: Xiao Gang

Personal details
- Born: 23 July 1956 (age 70) Chahar Right Back Banner, Inner Mongolia, China
- Party: Chinese Communist Party
- Education: Nankai University; Chinese Academy of Social Sciences

Chinese name
- Traditional Chinese: 郭樹清
- Simplified Chinese: 郭树清
Transcriptions
Standard Mandarin
- Hanyu Pinyin: Guō Shùqīng
- Wade–Giles: Kuo Shu-ching

Guo Shuqing (Chinese: 郭树清; born 23 July 1956) is a Chinese politician, banker, and financial regulator. He was the chairman of the China Banking and Insurance Regulatory Commission from 2018 to 2023.

Guo spent most of his career in the finance industry. He was the Governor and Deputy Party Secretary of Shandong province, chairman of the China Securities Regulatory Commission (CSRC), chairman of China Construction Bank, chairman of the State Administration of Foreign Exchange, vice-governor of the People's Bank of China and vice-governor of Guizhou Province as well as the director of the State Administration of Foreign Exchange.

== Early life and education ==
Guo Shuqing was born in August 1956 in Chahar Right Back Banner, Inner Mongolia Autonomous Region, near the city of Ulanqab. He is of Han Chinese background. In August 1974, he joined a farming commune in Siziwang Banner, near the regional capital Hohhot, as a laborer during the Down to the Countryside Movement. In 1978, he became part of the first batch of students to return to school after the Cultural Revolution, a period which effectively suspended higher education in China.

He graduated from Nankai University, one of the country's top universities, in 1982 and then pursued a master's degree at the Chinese Academy of Social Sciences.

After graduating he continued to take part in academic research while completing a doctorate in law. During his studies he also worked briefly as a researcher at the State Council office in charge of economic reform; he also took a year-long study abroad trip to St Antony's College at Oxford University.

== Career ==
Beginning in 1988, Guo became a full-time researcher at the State Council, working in various capacities for institutions related to economic restructuring. In March 1996 he became Secretary-General of the state commission in charge of macroeconomic management. In 1998, he was transferred to Guizhou province as Vice Governor.

In 2001, he became director of the State Administration of Foreign Exchange in addition to Vice Governor of the People's Bank of China (PBC), the country's central bank. In 2003 he became chief executive of Central Huijin Investment Ltd., a full state-owned subsidiary of China Investment Corporation. In 2005 he became chairman of the board of the China Construction Bank, one of China's largest banks by revenue. He served in that role for over six years. In 2011, he took on the job of chairman of the China Securities Regulatory Commission (CSRC), China's securities regulator.

In March 2013, Guo was tasked with his second regional stint, this time taking on the office of Governor of Shandong. In 2017, Guo was named chairman of the China Banking Regulatory Commission. In March 2018, he was appointed chairman of the newly established China Banking and Insurance Regulatory Commission. He also became the Party Secretary of the PBC.

Guo was an alternate of the 17th Central Committee of the Chinese Communist Party, and was a full member of the 18th and 19th Central Committees.

In March 2023, he was appointed as deputy chairperson of the Financial and Economic Affairs Committee of the 14th National People's Congress. He was succeeded by Pan Gongsheng as party secretary of the PBC.

Government offices
Preceded by Wu Xiaoling	Minister of State Administration of Foreign Exchange; 2001–2005	Succeeded by Hu Xiaolian
Preceded by Shang Fulin	Chairman of China Securities Regulatory Commission; 2011–2013	Succeeded by Xiao Gang
Preceded by Jiang Daming	Governor of Shandong; 2013–2017	Succeeded by Gong Zheng
Preceded by Shang Fulin	Chairman of China Banking Regulatory Commission; 2017–2018	Succeeded by Office abolished
New title	Chairman of China Banking and Insurance Regulatory Commission; 2018–2023	Succeeded by Office abolished (Li Yunze as Director of National Administration of Financial Regulation)
Business positions
New title	Chairman of Central Huijin Investment; 2003–2008	Succeeded by Lou Jiwei
Preceded by Zhang Enzhao	Chairman of China Construction Bank; 2005–2011	Succeeded by Wang Hongzhang
