= Beijing Financial Street =

Street in Beijing, China

Coordinates: 39°54′56″N 116°21′13″E

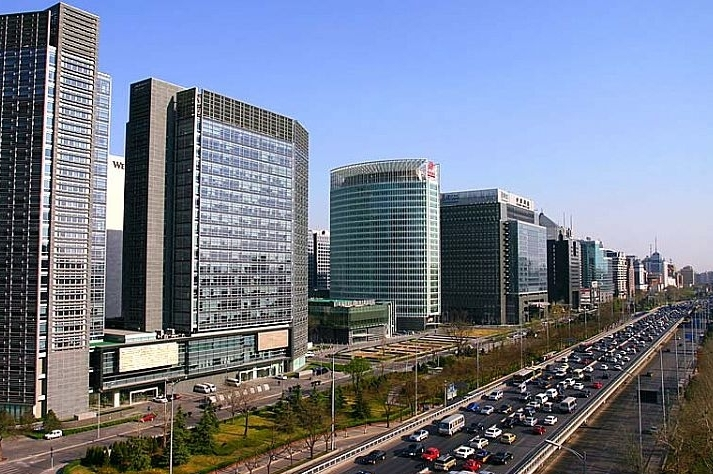
Financial Street, viewed from Beijing's 2nd Ring Road (2007)

Beijing Financial Street (BFS; Chinese: 北京金融街; pinyin: Běijīng Jīnróng Jiē) is a street located in the central of the Xicheng district of Beijing. As planned by the State Council in 1993, the street and its surrounding area are home to China's central bank (the People's Bank of China), the central government's financial regulatory bodies (including the National Financial Regulatory Administration, the China Securities Regulatory Commission, the State Administration of Foreign Exchange, and the Central Financial Commission), the Beijing Stock Exchange, national financial industry associations (such as the National Association of Financial Market Institutional Investors), and the headquarters of central government-owned commercial and investment banks, insurance and securities companies, and telecommunications operators.

Beijing Financial Street is being developed by Beijing Financial Street Holding Company, Ltd. The architectural firm of Skidmore, Owings & Merrill, along with SWA landscape architects prepared the urban plan, landscape, and the building design guidelines for the Central Park area of Financial Street, currently in construction with build-out scheduled for 2008. The building facilities are designed around interior courtyards, a design concept which typifies the ancient Hutong neighborhoods surrounding the Forbidden City.

== Buildings ==
This is a list of buildings from north to south in the numerical order.

Address	Alternative name	Primary tenant(s)
1 Financial Street	Jinyaguang Building	PetroChina
3 Financial Street	Jinding Building	Bank of China
4 Financial Street	Jinyi Building	Financial Street Holdings
5 Financial Street	Xinsheng Mansion	Beijing Changheng Investment Group, Chief Securities, China Securities Investor Protection Fund, Combest Holdings, Dongxing Securities, GF Securities, Guantao Law Firm, Hengbao, Industrial Securities, Jiangxi Copper, Jiutai Energy, Postal Savings Bank of China, Shanghai Langshi Investment Management
6 Financial Street		Chinese People's Political Consultative Conference (CPPCC)
7 Financial Street	Winland International Finance Centre	Axa, Bank of New York Mellon, Blackstone, Bloomberg, DBS Bank, Fidelity, Goldman Sachs, Hong Kong Stock Exchange, HSBC, Institute of International Finance, Invesco, JP Morgan, London Stock Exchange, NM Rothschild, PriceWaterhouseCoopers, Qatar Holdings, Rabobank, Royal Bank of Canada, Royal Bank of Scotland, Schroders, Standard Chartered, State Street, SWIFT, Temasek, UBS
8 Financial Street		Industrial & Commercial Bank of China
9 Financial Street		Asian Infrastructure Investment Bank, Bank of Shanghai, Credit Suisse
10 Financial Street		China Central Depository & Clearing
11 Financial Street	International Finance Centre	China RE
12A Financial Street	Fortune Time Building	China Export & Credit Insurance Corporation (Sinosure), Social Security Fund (SSF)
12B Financial Street	Fortune Resource International Centre	Morgan Stanley, Shanghai Pudong Development Bank, Zhaotai Land
12C Financial Street	Fortune Grace International Building	China Development Bank
12D Financial Street	Fortune Rich International Centre	China Pacific
12E Financial Street	Fortune Capital International Centre	China United Insurance Holdings
14A Financial Street	Excel	Citigroup, Franklin Templeton
14B Financial Street		Societe Generale, Taikang Life
14C Financial Street	China Everbright Centre	China Everbright Bank
15 Financial Street	Xinmao Building	China Banking Regulatory Commission, China Insurance Regulatory Commission
16 Financial Street	China Life Plaza	China Life
17A Financial Street	China Life Centre	China Life
17B Financial Street		Bank of Beijing
18 Financial Street		Bank of Communications
18A Financial Street		Datang International Power
18B Financial Street		Datang Group
19 Financial Street	Focus Place	China Securities Regulatory Commission
20 Financial Street	Hangyu Building	Asia-Pacific International
21 Financial Street		China Unicom
22 Financial Street		China National Advanced Payment System (CNAPS)
23 Financial Street	PingAn Mansion	PingAn
24A Financial Street	Jinze Building	China Taiping
24B Financial Street	Zhonghai Mansion	Industrial & Commercial Bank of China
25 Financial Street		China Construction Bank
26 Financial Street	Jinyang Building	Beijingi Stock Exchange
27 Financial Street	Investment Plaza	CITIC
28A Financial Street	Yintai Centre A	
28B Financial Street	Yintai Centre B	China Everbright Bank
28C Financial Street	Yintai Centre C	State Power Investment Corporation
29 Financial Street		China Mobile
30 Financial Street		State Administration of Foreign Exchange (SAFE)
31 Financial Street		China Telecom
32 Financial Street	Changhua Building	China Unicom
33 Financial Street	Tong Tai Mansion	Bank of Communications
34 Financial Street		Peoples Bank of China
35 Financial Street	Corporate Square	Shanghai Pudong Development Bank
36 Financial Street	International Financial Centre	China Merchants Bank
37 Financial Street	Parkson	Agricultural Bank of China
38 Financial Street	Ocean Plaza	China Ocean Shipping Company (COSCO), Shenzhen Development Bank
39 Financial Street		China Central Television (CCTV)

== Gallery ==
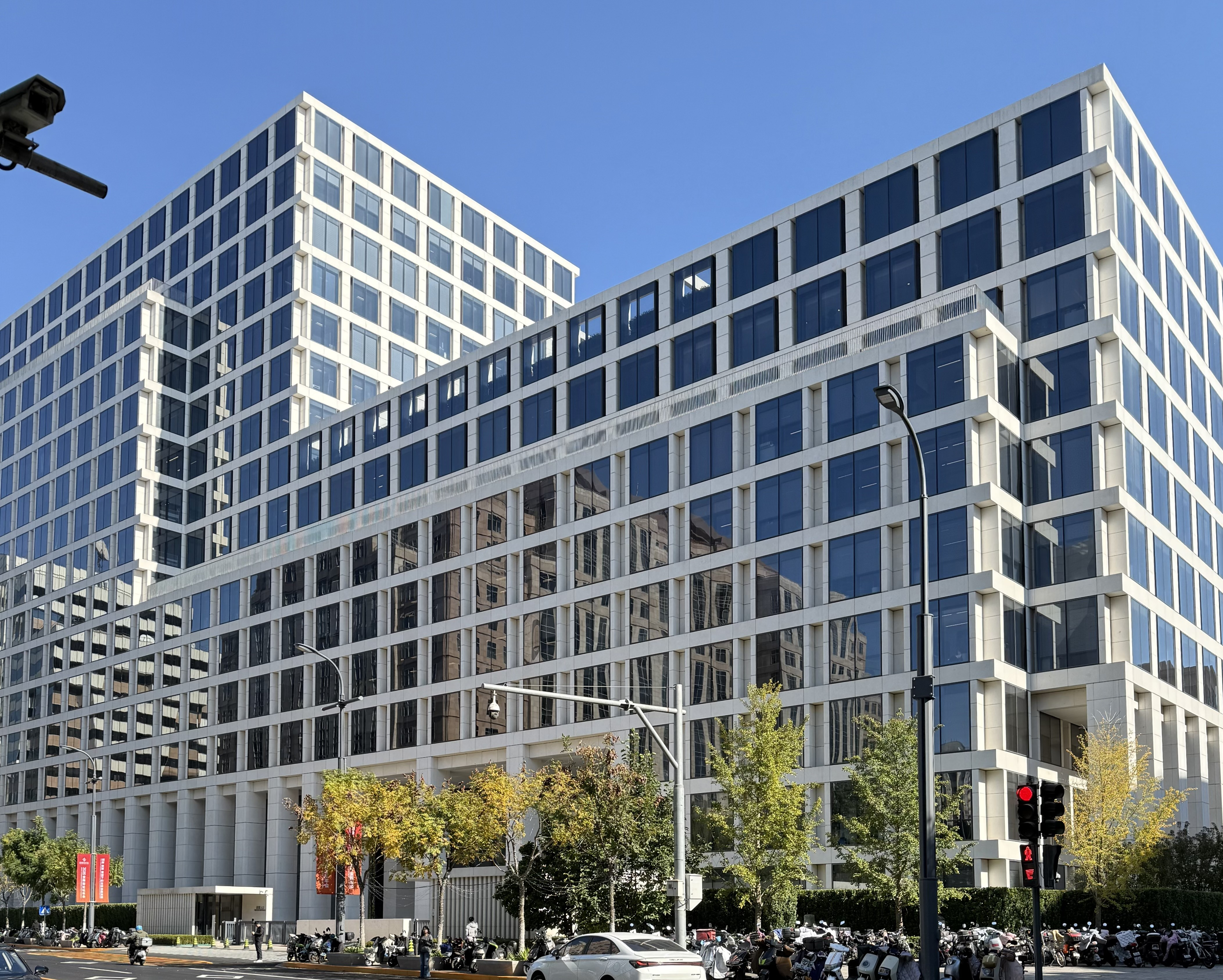
People's Bank of China

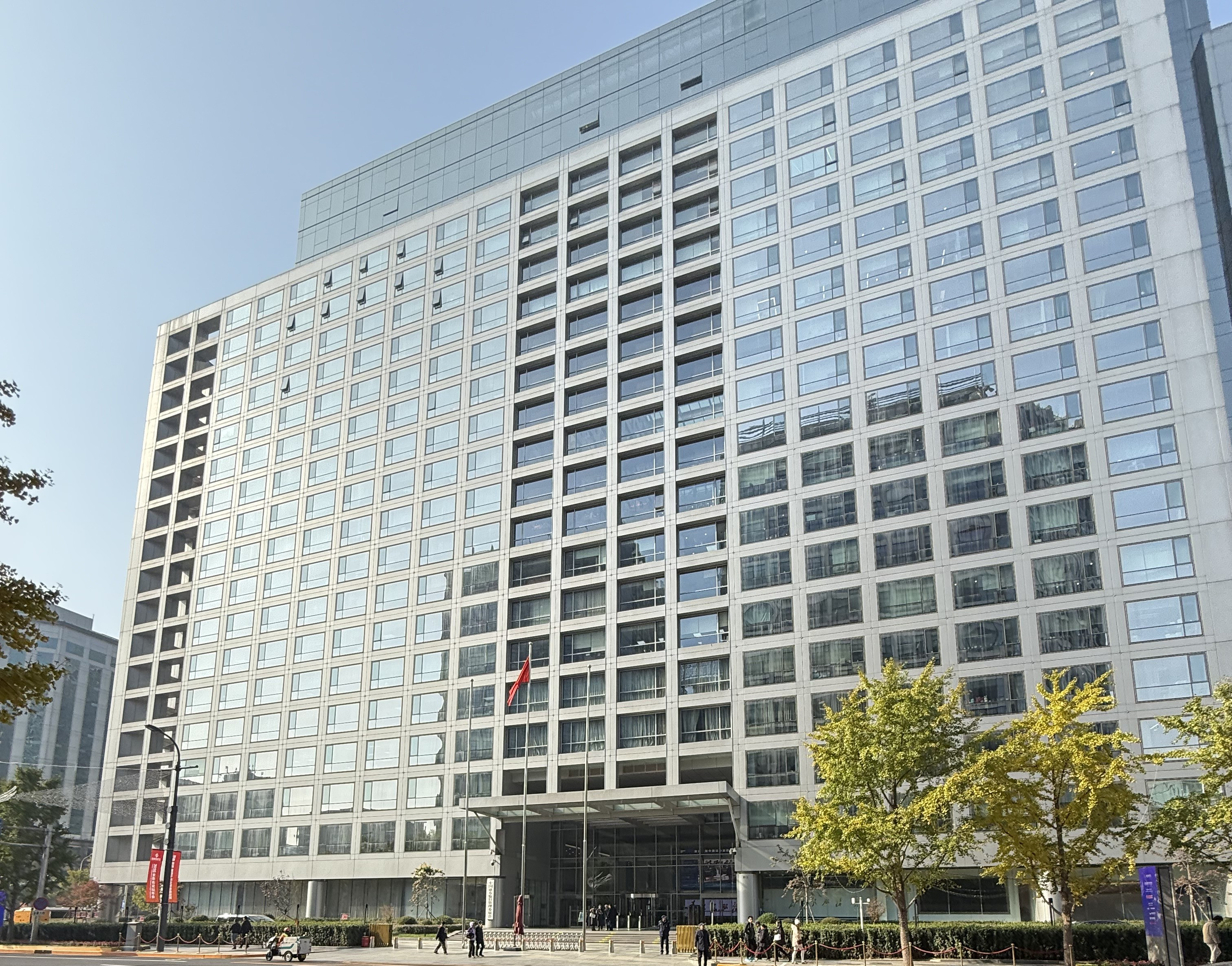
China Securities Regulatory Commission

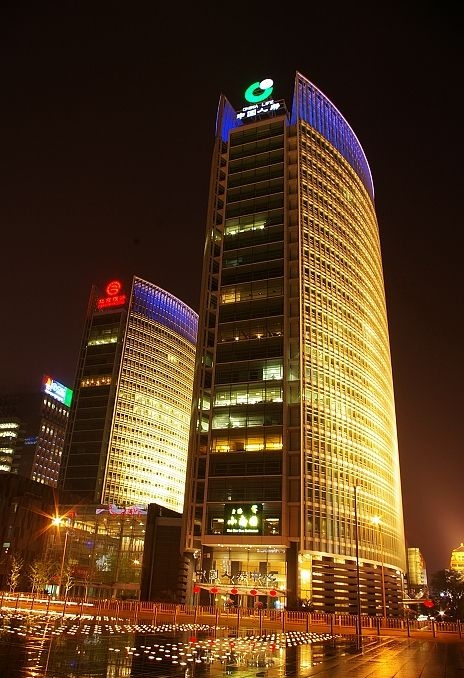
Twin Towers complex, head offices of Bank of Beijing and China Life

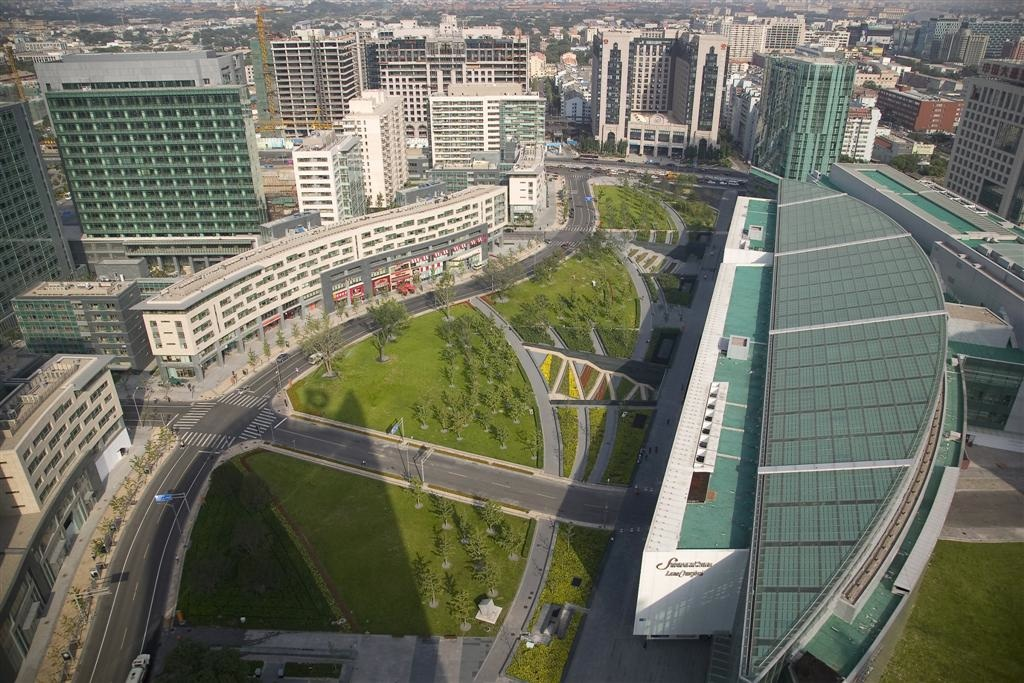
View of Central Park from the Twin Towers

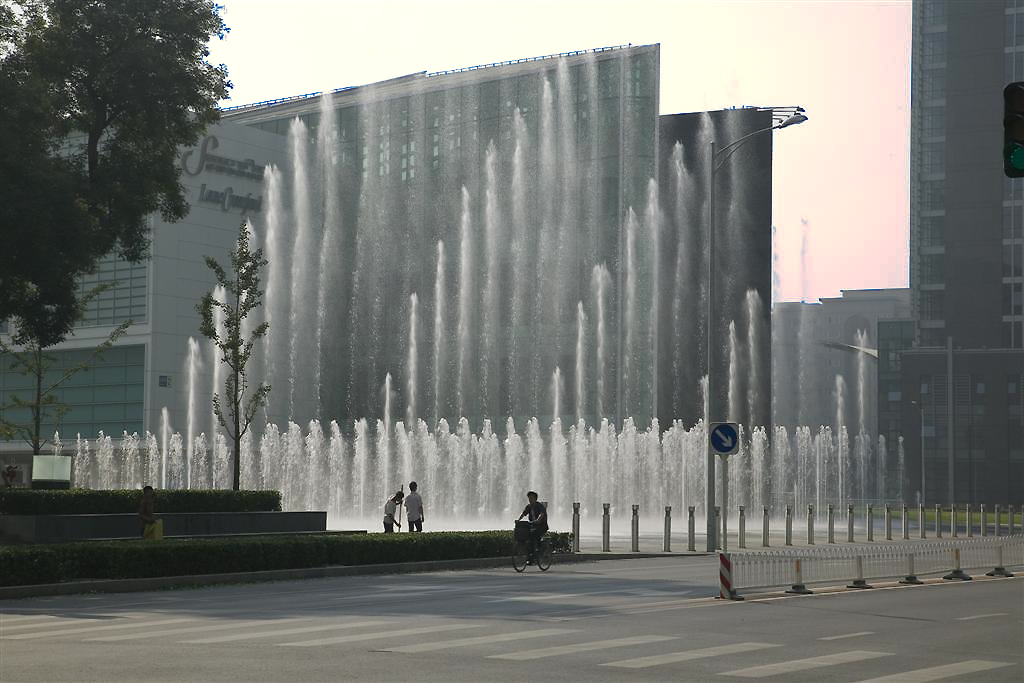
Fountains in Central Park

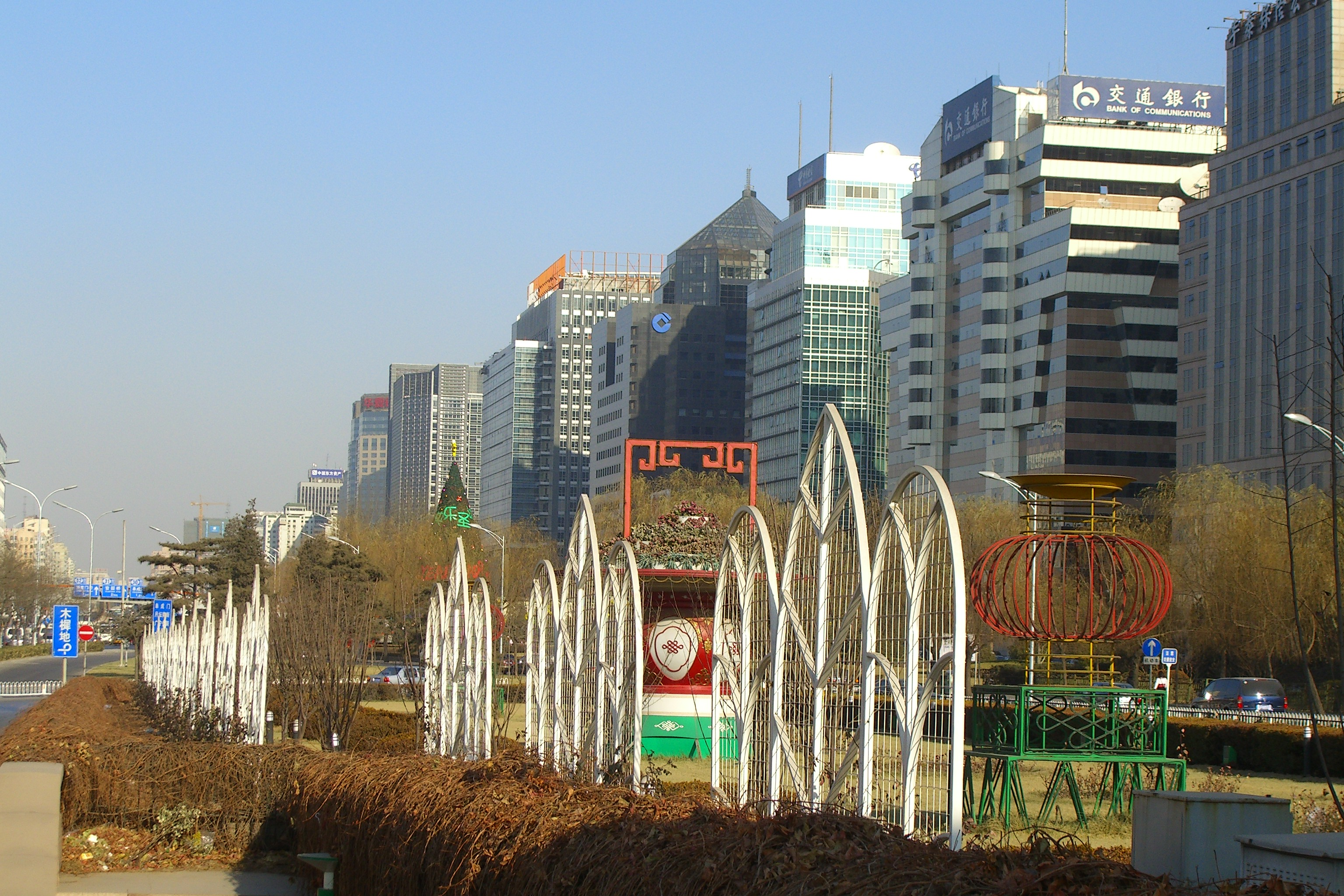
Beijing Financial Street seen from Fuxingmen

== See also ==
- Beijing central business district
- List of economic and technological development zones in Beijing
