= Wang Jianjun (politician, born 1968) =

Chinese politician

- 王建军

Vice President of the China Securities Regulatory Commission
- In office October 2021 – April 2025
- President: Yi Huiman; Wu Qing
- Preceded by: Yan Qingmin

Personal details
- Born: March 1968 (age 58) Langzhong County, Sichuan, China
- Party: Chinese Communist Party (expelled in 2025)
- Education: Harbin Institute of Technology; Renmin University of China

Chinese name
- Simplified Chinese: 王建军
- Traditional Chinese: 文建軍
Transcriptions
Standard Mandarin
- Hanyu Pinyin: Wáng Jiànjūn

Wang Jianjun (Chinese: 王建军; born March 1968) is a former Chinese politician. As of April 2025 he was under investigation by China's top anti-graft watchdog. Previously he served as vice president of the China Securities Regulatory Commission.

He was a delegate to the 13th National People's Congress.

== Early life and education ==
Wang was born in Langzhong County, Sichuan, in March 1968. In 1987, he was accepted to Harbin Institute of Technology, where he majored in automotive design. After graduation in 1991, he became an assistant engineer in the technical department of a car box factory in Changchun, capital of Jilin province. From 1993 to 1995 he did his postgraduate work at the Renmin University of China.

== Career ==
Wang joined the Chinese Communist Party (CCP) in October 1994, and began his political career in October 1995, when he became an official in the Beijing Municipal Sports Reform Commission.

Starting in April 1997, Wang served in several posts in the China Securities Regulatory Commission, including deputy director of the Comprehensive Department, director of the Comprehensive Department, deputy director of the Office, deputy director of Market Supervision Department, director of Market Supervision Department, and director of the Office.

Wang served as general manager of Shenzhen Stock Exchange from April 2016 to February 2020, and party secretary, the top political position, from February 2020 to October 2021.

In October 2021, Wang was elevated to vice president of the China Securities Regulatory Commission.

== Downfall ==
On 30 April 2025, Wang was put under investigation for alleged "serious violations of discipline and laws" by the Central Commission for Discipline Inspection (CCDI), the party's internal disciplinary body, and the National Supervisory Commission, the highest anti-corruption agency of China. On November 3, he was expelled from the CCP and dismissed from public office.

On 7 September 2026, Wang was sentenced to life imprisonment at Weifang Intermediate People's Court, for taking bribes in 93.4 million yuan.

Business positions
Preceded by Somg Liping	General Manager of Shenzhen Stock Exchange; 2016–2020	Succeeded by Sha Yan
Preceded by Wu Lijun	Chairman of Shenzhen Stock Exchange; 2020–2021	Succeeded by Chen Huaping
Government offices
Preceded by Yan Qingmin	Vice President of the China Securities Regulatory Commission; 2021–2025	Succeeded by TBA
