= Jiannan =

Jiannan may refer to:

== Real people ==
- Lu You (1125–1210), a poet of the Southern Song Dynasty, also known as Lu Jiannan (陸劍南) because of his poetry 《劍南詩稿》
- Zhang Jiannan (张坚男; born 1945), a composer
- Zhou Jiannan (1917−1995) was a Chinese politician
- Zhou Jiannan (musician), a Chinese musician, and zitherist

== Fictional characters ==
- Yang Jiannan (杨建南) a character in Chinese film Shanghai Fortress.

== See also ==
- Jiannan Road metro station, a station of the Taipei Metro
