= Wang Jianjun =

Wang Jianjun, may refer to:

- Wang Jianjun (politician, born 1958), retired politician, governor and party secretary of Qinghai, chairperson of the Qinghai Provincial Congress.
- Wang Jianjun (politician, born 1968), former vice president of the China Securities Regulatory Commission.
