= China Securities Journal =

Chinese newspaper

- Type: Daily newspaper
- Owner: Xinhua News Agency
- Founded: October 1992
- Political alignment: Chinese Communist Party
- OCLC number: 40638143
- Website: www.cs.com.cn
- Free online archives: epaper.cs.com.cn/zgzqb

China Securities Journal
- Simplified Chinese: 中国证券报
- Traditional Chinese: 中國証券報
- Hanyu Pinyin: Zhōngguó Zhèngquàn Bào
Transcriptions
Standard Mandarin
- Hanyu Pinyin: Zhōngguó Zhèngquàn Bào

The China Securities Journal (abbreviated as CSJ or ZGZQB), also transliterated as China Securities Post or China Securities News, is a national securities newspaper in China, published by Xinhua News Agency. It is based in Beijing, and has two offices in Shanghai and Shenzhen. It is one of the most important publications in the financial field.

In October 1992, China Securities Journal was published on a trial basis and was officially launched on January 3, 1993. It is designated by the China Securities Regulatory Commission, the China Banking Regulatory Commission and China Insurance Regulatory Commission to disclose information on listed companies, insurance companies and trust companies. Positioned as an investment adviser, China Securities Journal has a commitment to providing investors with guidance for investment choice. The editorial purpose of the newspaper is to report policies on the national economy, finance and securities, to disseminate information about finance and securities, to analyze the financial and securities market and to spread knowledge of finance and securities, so as to become a trustworthy investment consultant.

China Securities Journal mainly reports the securities market and the financial market, covering general economic trends in China and the world, macroeconomic policies, securities markets and listed companies, the newspaper also gives a systematic coverage to the market of currency, insurance, funds, futures, real estate, foreign exchange and foreign currency, gold markets and postal service cards.

== See also ==
- Banking in China
- Chinese financial system
- Insurance industry in China

Related periodicals

- Securities Times
- Shanghai Securities Journal
- Securities Daily
