= Securities Times =

Chinese financial newspaper

- Type: China's state-owned newspaper
- Owner: People's Daily Press
- Founded: November 27, 1993
- Headquarters: Shenzhen
- OCLC number: 866047964
- Website: www.stcn.com

Securities Times
- Simplified Chinese: 证券时报
- Traditional Chinese: 證券時報
Transcriptions
Standard Mandarin
- Hanyu Pinyin: Zhèngquàn shíbào

The Securities Times (abbreviated as ST; 证券时报; 證券時報) is a state-owned financial newspaper in China, with headquarters in Shenzhen. The newspaper is supervised and organized by the People's Daily Press.

Securities Times is one of the four major securities newspapers in China, the other three being China Securities Journal, Shanghai Securities Journal and Securities Daily.

== History ==
The newspaper was launched on November 27, 1993.

In 2023, the Securities Times criticized a report by Goldman Sachs that was bearish toward Chinese state-owned banks.
