= Financial News (disambiguation) =

Financial News is a London-based newspaper.

Financial News may also refer to:

- The Financial News, South Korean newspaper
- Financial News (1884–1945), defunct British newspaper
- Financial News (China), Chinese newspaper
