= Liang Huiling =

Chinese politician (born 1962)

- 梁惠玲
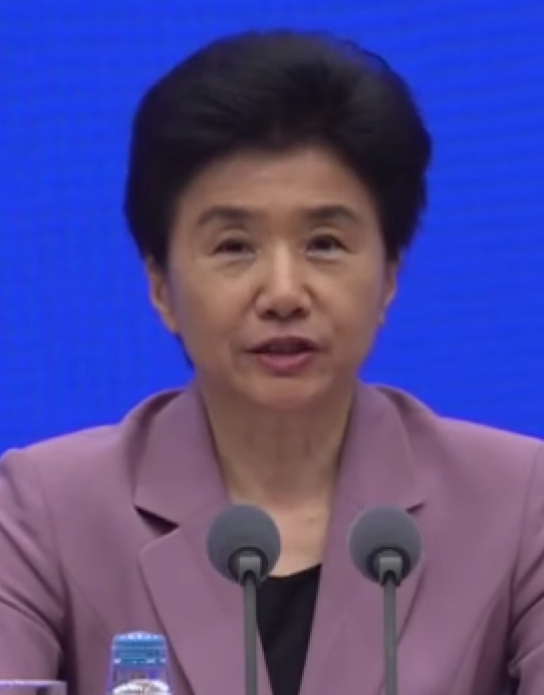
- Liang in 2024

Governor of Heilongjiang
- Incumbent
- Assumed office 9 December 2022
- Party Secretary: Xu Qin
- Preceded by: Hu Changsheng

Chairwoman of the All-China Federation of Supply and Marketing Cooperatives
- In office July 2021 – December 2022
- Preceded by: Yu Hongqiu

Personal details
- Born: August 1962 (age 64) Yicheng County, Hubei, China
- Party: Chinese Communist Party
- Education: Central China Normal University; Central Party School of the Chinese Communist Party

Liang Huiling (Chinese: 梁惠玲; pinyin: Liáng Huìlíng; born August 1962) is a Chinese politician currently serving as governor of Heilongjiang. She was chairwoman of the All-China Federation of Supply and Marketing Cooperatives from 2021 to 2022.

Liang was a delegate to the 11th National People's Congress and is a delegate to the 13th National People's Congress. She was a member of the 19th Central Commission for Discipline Inspection. She was a representative of the 19th National Congress of the Chinese Communist Party. She is a representative of the 20th National Congress of the Chinese Communist Party and a member of the 20th Central Committee of the Chinese Communist Party.

== Early life and education ==
Liang was born in Yicheng County (now Yicheng), Hubei, in August 1962. After resuming the college entrance examination, in 1979, she entered Central China Normal University, where she majored in Chinese language and literature. After university in 1983, she taught at Xiangfan No. 5 Middle School for only five months.

== Political career ==
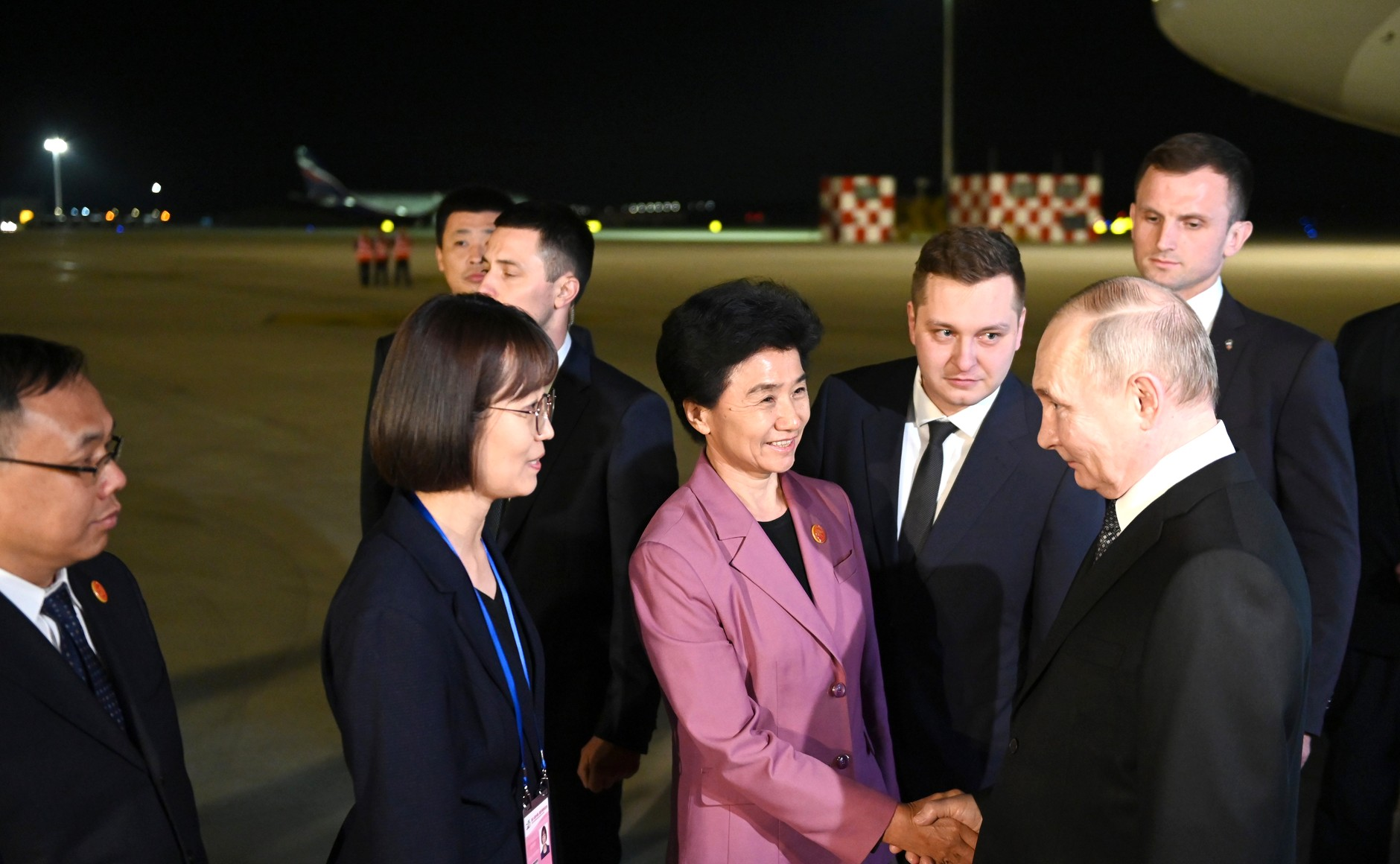
Liang with Russian President Vladimir Putin in Harbin during Putin's visit to China in May 2024

=== Hubei ===
Liang joined the Chinese Communist Party (CCP) in October 1985. In December 1984, Liang became deputy secretary of Xiangfan Municipal Committee of the Communist Youth League of China, rising to secretary in June 1994. In February 1995, she was appointed deputy party secretary of Gucheng County, and held that office until June 1997.

Beginning in 1997, Liang served in several posts in Xiaogan, including vice mayor (1998–2000), head of the Organization Department of the CCP Xiaogan Municipal Committee (2000–2003), deputy secretary (2003–2008), acting mayor (2006), and mayor (2006–2008).

In July 2008, Liang was made president and party branch secretary of Hubei Women's Federation, replacing Zhang Daili.

In August 2011, Liang was appointed party secretary of Ezhou, a post she kept until January 2013, when she was promoted to vice governor of Hubei. Liang was appointed head of the United Front Work Department and president of the Hubei Provincial Federation of Trade Unions in April 2015 and was admitted to member of the Standing Committee of the CCP Hubei Provincial Committee, the province's top authority.

=== Hebei ===
Liang was transferred from her job in Hubei province to north China's Hebei province in December 2016. She was appointed secretary of Hebei Provincial Commission for Discipline Inspection and was admitted to member of the Standing Committee of the CCP Hebei Provincial Committee, the province's top authority. She concurrently served as director of the Hebei Provincial Supervisory Commission since January 2018.

=== Central government ===
Liang was party branch secretary of the Red Cross Society of China in October 2018, in addition to serving as executive vice president.

In June 2021, Liang was named chairwoman of the All-China Federation of Supply and Marketing Cooperatives, confirmed in the following month.

=== Heilongjiang ===
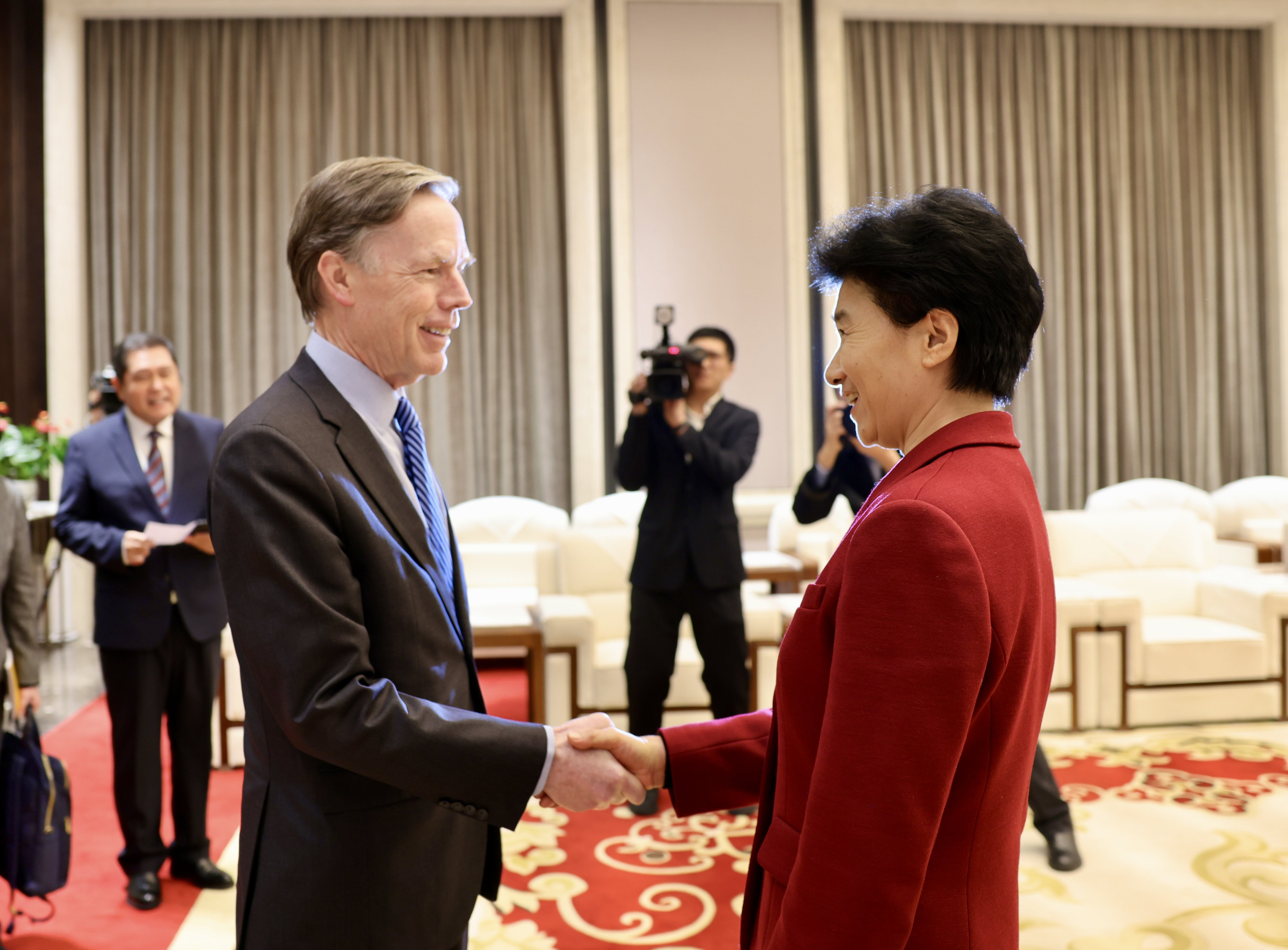
American ambassador to China R. Nicholas Burns meeting with Liang (2024)

On 7 December 2022, she was named acting governor of Heilongjiang, confirmed on 16 January 2023.

Government offices
Preceded by Yue Yong (岳勇)	Mayor of Xiaogan; 2006–2008	Succeeded by Liang Weinian
New title	Director of the Hebei Provincial Supervisory Commission; 2018	Succeeded by Liu Shuang
Civic offices
Preceded by Zhang Daili	President of Hubei Women's Federation; 2008–2011	Succeeded by Xiao Juhua
Preceded by Yu Hongqiu	Chairwoman of the All-China Federation of Supply and Marketing Cooperatives; 2021–present	Incumbent
Preceded by Hu Changsheng	Governor of Heilongjiang; 2022–present	Incumbent
Party political offices
Preceded by Fan Ruiping	Communist Party Secretary of Ezhou; 2011–2013	Succeeded by Han Jin
Preceded by Zhang Daili	Head of the United Front Work Department of Hubei Provincial Committee of the Chinese Communist Party; 2015–2016	Succeeded by Erkinjan Turaxun
Preceded by Chen Chaoying	Secretary of Hebei Provincial Commission for Discipline Inspection of the Chinese Communist Party; 2016–2018	Succeeded by Liu Shuang
Preceded by Xu Ke (徐科)	Party Branch Secretary of the Red Cross Society of China; 2018–2021	Succeeded by Wang Ke (王可)
