= STCN =

As an abbreviation, STCN may refer to:

- Securities Times, a major financial paper in China
- Short-Title Catalogue, Netherlands, a database of the Dutch bibliography up to the year 1800
