= Wang Xiaoguang =

Chinese politician

- 王晓光

Vice Governor of Guizhou
- In office June 2017 – January 2018
- Governor: Sun Zhigang; Shen Yiqin

Communist Party Secretary of Zunyi
- In office November 2013 – June 2017
- Preceded by: Liao Shaohua
- Succeeded by: Long Changchun

Communist Party Secretary of Liupanshui
- In office September 2011 – November 2013
- Preceded by: Liu Yimin
- Succeeded by: Li Zaiyong

Mayor of Zunyi
- In office February 2009 – September 2011
- Preceded by: Mu Degui
- Succeeded by: Wang Bingqing

Personal details
- Born: October 1961 (age 64–65) Juye County, Shandong, China
- Party: Chinese Communist Party (1986-2018, expelled)
- Education: Guiyang Normal College; Southwest College of Political Science and Law

Wang Xiaoguang (simplified Chinese: 王晓光; traditional Chinese: 王曉光; pinyin: Wáng Xiǎoguāng; born October 1961) is a former Chinese politician who served as Vice Governor of Guizhou. He was dismissed from his position in March 2018 and placed under investigation by the Chinese Communist Party (CCP)'s Central Commission for Discipline Inspection and the National Supervisory Commission. Wang was the first high-ranking official probed since the National Supervisory Commission was established in March 2018.

== Career ==
Wang Xiaoguang was born in October 1961, and he was entered to Guiyang Normal College in 1980. After he graduated from Guiyang Normal College, he became the instructor of Guiyang Police School in 1984.

In 1991, Wang became the deputy director of the Office of Guiyang Commission for Discipline Inspection. He was appointed as the Secretariat of the Office of the CCP Guiyang Committee in 1995. In 1996 he moved to Wudang District, Guiyang, and appointed as the Deputy District Governor. He promoted to the CCP Secretary in 2001.

In 2002, Wang was appointed as the Deputy Mayor of Guiyang, then he promoted to the Secretariat of the CCP Guiyang Committee in 2004.

In 2006, Wang was appointed as the Deputy Mayor of Zunyi, and he promoted to the Mayor in 2008. He was appointed as the Party Secretary of Liupanshui in 2011.

In 2013, Wang was appointed as the Party Secretary of Zunyi. He was appointed as the Vice Governor of Guizhou in June 2017, until he was resigned in January 2018.

== Downfall ==
On April 1, 2018, Wang Xiaoguang was placed under investigation by the Central Commission for Discipline Inspection, the party's internal disciplinary body, and the National Supervisory Commission, the highest anti-corruption agency of the People's Republic of China, for "serious violations of regulations and laws". Wang became the first official of sub-provincial rank to be investigated for corruption following the founding of the National Supervisory Commission.

Following the results of the investigation, on September 20, 2018, Wang Xiaoguang was stripped of his Party membership and barred from holding public titles. On December 20, he stood trial at the First Intermediate People's Court of Chongqing Municipality on charges of taking bribes, embezzlement and insider trading. He was accused of abusing his powers in former positions he held between 1998 and 2017 in Guizhou to seek benefits for others in shareholding transfer, obtaining projects and project funds, and personnel promotions, and in return accepting money and property worth over 48.7 million yuan ($7.1 million) personally or through his family members. Wang fabricated projects from which he illegally gained land ownership and embezzled 4.8 million yuan ($744,480) of land transfer fee when he was head of Wudang District of Guiyang between 1999 and 2000. He also illegally bought and sold shares directly or through his relatives in the stock market when he gained insider information by taking advantage of his posts or from others, illegally profiting with more than 162.69 million yuan ($24.82 million) from August 2009 to February 2016.

On April 23, 2019, Wang was sentenced on 20 years in prison and fined 173.5 million yuan ($25.8 million). Wang was charged with accepting bribes worth 48.7 million yuan. Besides, he also charged with plundering the public fund worth 4.8 million yuan and illegally making 162 million yuan of gains from insider trading, by the First Intermediate People's Court of Chongqing.

Government offices
Preceded by Mu Degui	Mayor of Zunyi; 2009–2011	Succeeded by Wang Bingqing
Party political offices
Preceded by Liu Yimin	Communist Party Secretary of Liupanshui; 2013–2017	Succeeded by Li Zaiyong
Preceded by Liao Shaohua	Communist Party Secretary of Zunyi; 2013–2017	Succeeded by Long Changchun
