= China Banking and Insurance Regulatory Commission =

2018–2023 Chinese regulatory agency

- 中国银行保险监督管理委员会

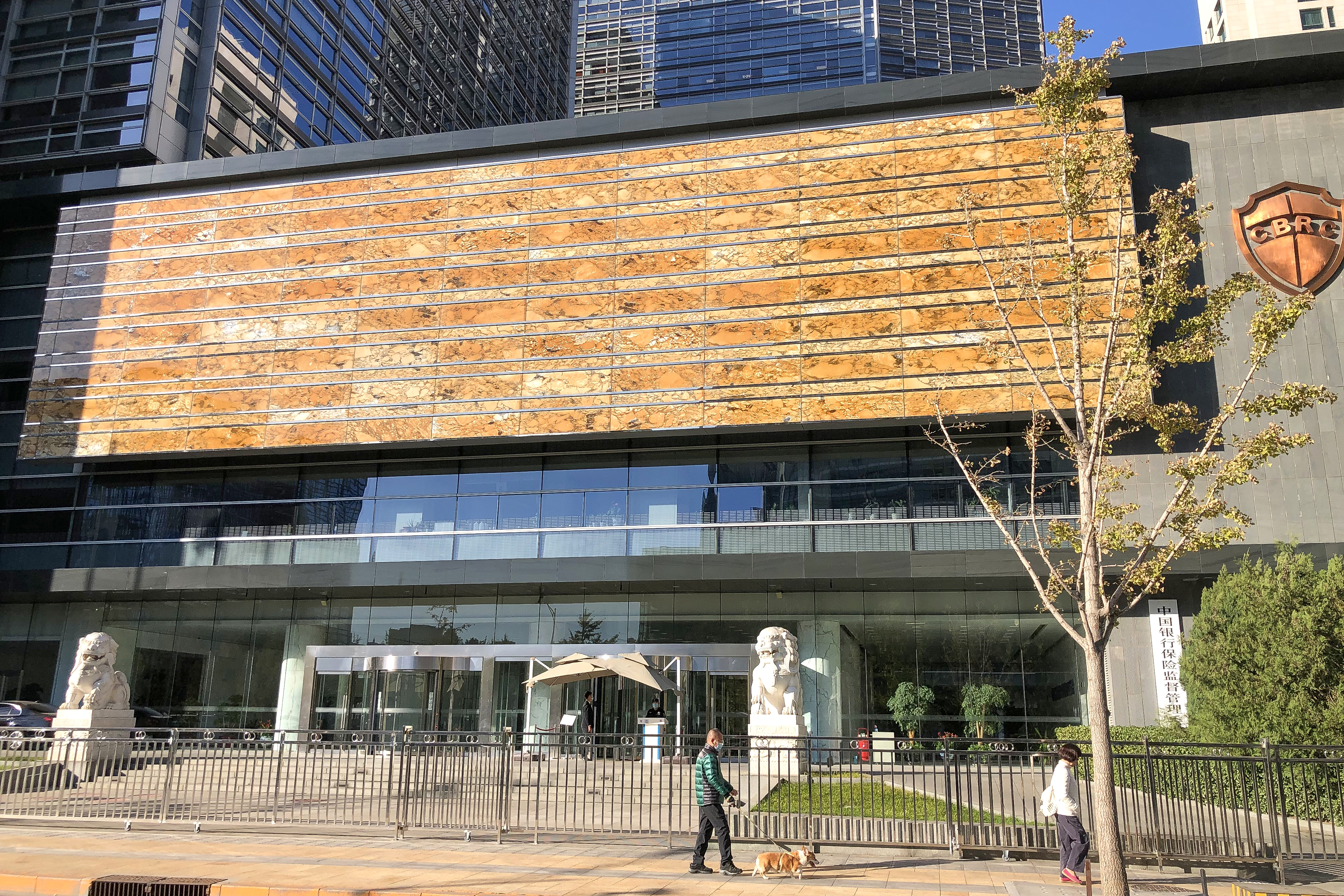

Agency overview
- Formed: 8 April 2018
- Preceding agencies: China Banking Regulatory Commission; China Insurance Regulatory Commission
- Dissolved: March 2023
- Superseding agency: National Financial Regulatory Administration
- Jurisdiction: People's Republic of China
- Headquarters: Beijing, People's Republic of China
- Agency executive: Guo Shuqing, Chairman
- Parent department: State Council
- Website: cbirc.gov.cn

The China Banking and Insurance Regulatory Commission (CBIRC) was an agency of the State Council of China responsible for

- Supervising the establishment and ongoing business activities of banking and insurance institutions.
- Taking enforcement actions against financial regulatory violations.

The commission was replaced by the newly formed National Financial Regulatory Administration in May 2023.

== History ==
The CBIRC was established in April 2018 as part of the deepening the reform of the Party and state institutions by a merger of China's banking and insurance regulators, namely, the China Banking Regulatory Commission (CBRC) and China Insurance Regulatory Commission (CIRC).

It supervised and managed China's banking and insurance sectors, participated in the drafting of legislation and regulation relevant to those sectors, performed supervisory and management functions in those sectors, and conducting studies on the management of those sectors. As a result of these functions, it was also involved in regulating fintech and data security and privacy issues.

It was abolished in March 2023 as part of a plan to overhaul government agencies, being replaced by the National Administration of Financial Regulation.

== See also ==
- History of banking in China
