= Liao Shaohua =

Chinese politician (born 1960)

- 廖少华

Communist Party Secretary of Zunyi
- In office July 2012 – October 2013
- Preceded by: Yu Hongqiu
- Succeeded by: Wang Xiaoguang

Communist Party Secretary of Qiandongnan Miao and Dong Autonomous Prefecture
- In office July 2005 – July 2012
- Preceded by: Liu Guanglei
- Succeeded by: Li Feiyue

Mayor of Liupanshui
- In office December 2001 – July 2005
- Preceded by: Yi Shengjin
- Succeeded by: Liu Yimin

Personal details
- Born: November 1960 (age 65) Suining, Sichuan, China
- Party: Chinese Communist Party (1982–2014, expelled)
- Spouse: Wang Li
- Education: Southwest Jiaotong University; Central Party School of the Chinese Communist Party

Liao Shaohua (simplified Chinese: 廖少华; traditional Chinese: 廖少華; pinyin: Liào Shàohuá; born November 1960) is a former Chinese politician who spent most of his career in southwest China's Guizhou province. He successively served as the mayor of the city of Liupanshui, then Party Secretary of the Qiandongnan Miao and Dong Autonomous Prefecture. In Qiandongnan Prefecture, Liao developed a reputation for being a low-key competent official. He oversaw a tough local anti-corruption campaign that saw over a dozen local officials charged and sentenced to prison. He also engaged with ordinary residents by responding to inquiries and petitions online. He became Party Secretary of Zunyi in July 2012, which eventually earned him a seat on the provincial party Standing Committee, making Liao one of the province's highest-ranked officials.

Liao was abruptly removed from office in October 2013, and was subject to a corruption investigation by the party's internal disciplinary body. Liao was convicted on charges of abuse of power and bribery, and sentenced to 16 years in prison.

== Biography ==
Liao was born in Suining, Sichuan in November 1960. After the resumption of University Entrance Examination in 1977, Liao entered Southwest Jiaotong University in March 1978, majoring in railway engineering, where he graduated in August 1982.

Liao began work in August 1982 and he joined the Chinese Communist Party in December 1984. Beginning in August 1982, Liao worked in China Railway No.5 Engineering Corporation. He remained in the company until August 1997. Liao served as the President of Guizhou Youth Federation between February 1998 to May 1998.

In May 1998 he was promoted to become the vice-chairman of Guizhou Planning Commission, a position he held until December 2001.

=== Leading local governments in Guizhou ===
In December 2001, he was appointed the Mayor of Liupanshui, concurrently holding the office of Deputy Party Secretary. He remained in that position until July 2005, when he was transferred to Qiandongnan Miao and Dong Autonomous Prefecture and appointed the Party Secretary.

In the Qiandongnan region, Liao was known for his low-key leadership style. He oversaw a tough local anti-corruption campaign, personally handling some 50 cases of corruption, leading to the conviction and jail sentences for over a dozen local officials. His actions were widely praised in the community. He was also known to have engaged with residents online. Liao once said, "The internet is a new form of democratic participation; it opens the channels for ordinary internet users to air their concerns with the government. Between July 2008 and August 2009, residents wrote over 150 messages for Liao on an official online portal. Liao responded to every message, and was said to have addressed the concerns of residents in over half of the cases.

Liao was appointed as the Party Secretary of the Communist revolutionary heartland of Zunyi in July 2012, and he was named a Standing Committee member of the CCP Guizhou Committee in January 2013, catapulting him to "sub-provincial level" office.

=== Corruption investigation ===
On October 28, 2013, Liao was scheduled to preside over a meeting of the municipal party leadership. He did not show up and the meeting was cancelled without explanation. It was later announced that Liao would be investigated by the CCP's Central Commission for Discipline Inspection (CCDI) for "serious violations of laws and regulations". On October 31, Liao was dismissed from his position for corruption. That Liao, known locally as an anti-corruption crusader, would himself fall from grace due to corruption surprised many in the communities which he served; it was said to have further eroded public trust of government authorities. In April 2014, the CCDI concluded that Liao took a "large amount of bribes" and abused the powers of his office; the case was then moved onto prosecution by the Supreme People's Procuratorate.

Liao was tried at the Xi'an People's Intermediate Court in 2015. He was found guilty of abuse of power and bribery and sentenced to 16 years in prison on April 9, 2015. Court documents showed Liao as having taken some 13.24 million yuan ($2.13 million) in bribes, and forced the finance department of the Qiaodongnan regional government to repay a development company some 3 million yuan, leading to the "waste of public funds."

== Personal life ==
Liao is married to Wang Li (王丽), a vice-president of the company that runs the Guizhou-Guangxi Railway. Wang was also investigated after the case against her husband had been opened.

Non-profit organization positions
Preceded by Chen Haifeng	Secretary of Guizhou Provincial Party Committee of the Communist Youth League of China; 1997–1998	Succeeded by Dong Shaolong
Government offices
Preceded by Yi Shengjin	Mayor of Liupanshui; 2001–2005	Succeeded by Liu Yimin
Party political offices
Preceded by Liu Guanglei	Communist Party Secretary of Qiandongnan Miao and Dong Autonomous Prefecture; 2005–2012	Succeeded by Li Feiyue
Preceded by Yu Hongqiu	Communist Party Secretary of Zunyi; 2012–2013	Succeeded by Wang Xiaoguang
