= Hanjin (disambiguation) =

The Hanjin Group is a South Korean conglomerate.

Hanjin, Han-jin, or Han Jin can also refer to:

- Japanese for a commoner
- Han Hye-jin (model), also known as Han Jin, South Korean fashion model
- Hanjin Tan (born 1976), Singaporean musician
- Han Jin (businessman), Chinese-born entrepreneur
- Kweon Han-jin (Korean: 권한진; born 1988), South Korean football defender
