= Yu Hongqiu =

Chinese politician

- 喻红秋

Vice Chairperson of the National Supervisory Commission
- Incumbent
- Assumed office 28 February 2021
- Chairperson: Yang Xiaodu; Liu Jinguo

Deputy Secretary of the Central Commission for Discipline Inspection
- Incumbent
- Assumed office January 2021
- Secretary: Li Xi

Chairperson of All-China Federation of Supply and Marketing Cooperatives
- In office November 2019 – January 2021
- Preceded by: Liu Shiyu
- Succeeded by: Liang Huiling

Secretary of the Political and Legal Affairs Commission of the Henan Provincial Committee of the Chinese Communist Party
- In office August 2018 – October 2019
- Preceded by: Xu Ganlu
- Succeeded by: Gan Rongkun

Specifically-designated Deputy Communist Party Secretary of Henan
- In office July 2018 – November 2019
- Preceded by: Wang Jiong
- Succeeded by: Kong Changsheng

Personal details
- Born: October 27, 1960 (age 65) Laizhou, Shandong, China
- Party: Chinese Communist Party
- Education: Jilin University

Chinese name
- Simplified Chinese: 喻红秋
- Traditional Chinese: 喻紅秋
Transcriptions
Standard Mandarin
- Hanyu Pinyin: Yǔ Hóngqiū

Yu Hongqiu (Chinese: 喻红秋; born October 1960) is a Chinese politician, serving since 2021 as vice chairperson of the National Supervisory Commission and deputy secretary of the Central Commission for Discipline Inspection. She previously served as chairperson of All-China Federation of Supply and Marketing Cooperatives, secretary of the Political and Legal Affairs Commission of the CCP Henan Provincial Committee and Deputy Communist Party Secretary of Henan. She served in her early career at the All China Federation of Trade Unions. In 2016, she became discipline group leader at the Organization Department of the Chinese Communist Party.

== Career ==
Yu is considered native to Laizhou, Shandong province. A graduate of Jilin University, she has a bachelor's in political economics and a master's degree in Economics. After graduating from university, she was an instructor at the China Gongyun School (中国工运学院). She then joined the Communist Youth League at the All China Federation of Trade Unions. In July 1990, she became a party functionary at the national leadership of the China Petrochemical Trade Union, where she rose steadily through the ranks. After 2000, she began overseeing development and business expansion, then asset supervision.

In October 2010, Yu was dispatched to Guizhou, to serve as deputy party chief of Guiyang, the provincial capital. In February 2011, she was named party chief of Zunyi city. In April 2012, she entered the Guizhou provincial party standing committee, then in July was named head of the provincial Publicity Department. In October 2013, she became a secretary of the national secretariat of the All-China Women's Federation.

In March 2015, Yu was named disciplinary group of the Organization Department of the Chinese Communist Party.

In July 2018, Yu was named deputy party chief of Henan and head of the provincial political and legal affairs commission.

In November 2019, Yu succeeded Liu Shiyu as chairperson of All-China Federation of Supply and Marketing Cooperatives.

In January 2021, Yu was chosen as deputy secretary of the Central Commission for Discipline Inspection, in addition to serving as vice chairperson of the National Supervisory Commission.

Party political offices
Preceded by Mu Degui	Communist Party Secretary of Zunyi; 2011–2012	Succeeded by Liao Shaohua
Preceded by Shen Yiqin	Head of the Publicity Department of Guizhou Provincial Committee of the Chinese Communist Party; 2012–2013	Succeeded by Zhang Guangzhi
Preceded by Xu Ganlu	Secretary of the Political and Legal Affairs Commission of the Henan Provincial Committee of the Chinese Communist Party; 2018–2019	Succeeded by Gan Rongkun
Preceded by Wang Jiong	Specifically-designated Deputy Communist Party Secretary of Henan; 2018–2019	Succeeded by Kong Changsheng
Civic offices
Preceded by Liu Shiyu	Chairperson of All-China Federation of Supply and Marketing Cooperatives; 2019–2021	Succeeded by Liang Huiling
