= Ma Yongwei =

Chinese politician (1942–2024)

- 马永伟

President of China Insurance Regulatory Commission
- In office November 1998 – October 2002
- Preceded by: New title
- Succeeded by: Wu Dingfu

Personal details
- Born: August 1942 Rongcheng County, Shandong, China
- Died: 8 October 2024 (aged 82) Beijing, China
- Party: Chinese Communist Party
- Education: Dongbei University of Finance and Economics

Chinese name
- Simplified Chinese: 马永伟
- Traditional Chinese: 馬永偉
Transcriptions
Standard Mandarin
- Hanyu Pinyin: Mǎ Yǒngwěi

Ma Yongwei (Chinese: 马永伟; August 1942 – 8 October 2024) was a Chinese banker and politician who served as president of China Insurance Regulatory Commission from 1998 to 2002.

He was a member of the Standing Committee of the 10th Chinese People's Political Consultative Conference. He was a representative of the 13th, 14th, 15th, and 16th National Congress of the Chinese Communist Party.

== Early life and education ==
Ma was born in Rongcheng County, Shandong, in August 1942. In 1966 he graduated from Liaoning University of Finance and Economics (now Dongbei University of Finance and Economics).

== Career ==
After University in 1967, Ma was assigned to the People's Bank of Lu'an, and joined the Chinese Communist Party (CCP) in 1981. He was promoted to vice governor of Anhui Branch of the Agricultural Bank of China in 1982. In July 1984 he was promoted again to become vice governor of the Agricultural Bank of China. He eventually became governor of the Agricultural Bank of China in July 1985.

Ma was appointed chairman of the People's Insurance Company of China on 20 July 1994, concurrently serving as party branch secretary and general manager.

In November 1998, Ma was chosen as president of China Insurance Regulatory Commission, a position he held until October 2002.

== Death ==
Ma died in Beijing on 8 October 2024, at the age of 82.

Business positions
Preceded by Han Lei	Governor of the Agricultural Bank of China; 1985–1998	Succeeded by Shi Jiliang
Preceded by Li Yumin	Chairman of the People's Insurance Company of China; 1994–1998	Succeeded by Position revoked
Government offices
New title	President of China Insurance Regulatory Commission; 1998–2002	Succeeded by Wu Dingfu
