= All-China Federation of Supply and Marketing Cooperatives =

Government organization in China

- 中华全国供销合作总社
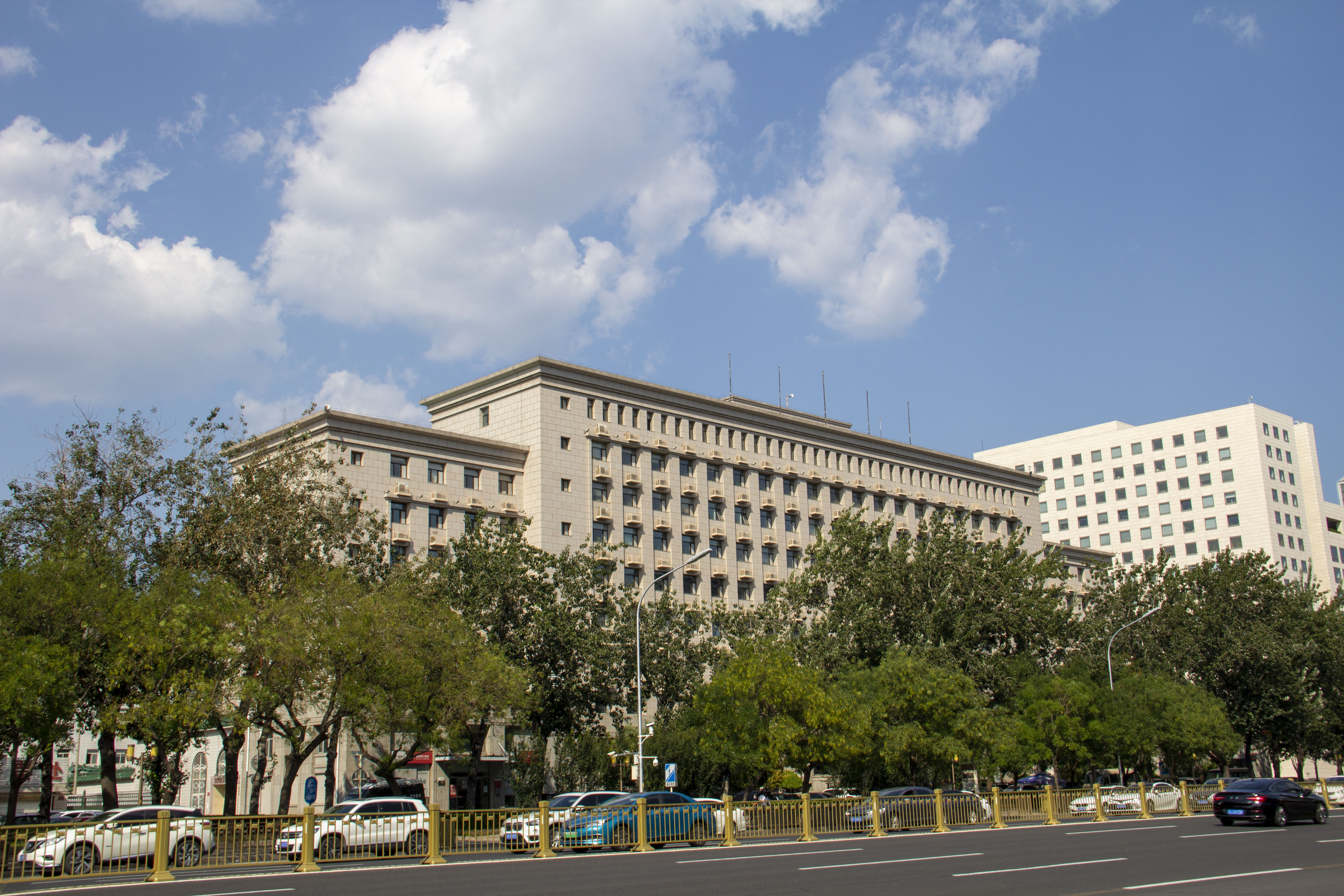
- Office building

- Location in Beijing
- Abbreviation: ACFSMC
- Predecessor: Central Cooperation Administration
- Formation: November 1949; 77 years ago
- Founded at: Beijing, China
- Type: Governmental organization
- Headquarters: Xicheng District, Beijing, China
- Coordinates: 39°54′49″N 116°22′39″E
- Official language: Chinese
- Party Secretary: Han Liping
- Chairperson: TBA
- Affiliations: State Council of the People's Republic of China

All-China Federation of Supply and Marketing Cooperatives
- Traditional Chinese: 中華全國供銷合作總社
- Simplified Chinese: 中华全国供销合作总社
Transcriptions
Standard Mandarin
- Hanyu Pinyin: Zhōnghuá Quánguó Gōngxiāo Hézuò Zǒngshè

The All-China Federation of Supply and Marketing Cooperatives (Chinese: 中华全国供销合作总社) is a joint organization of the national supply and marketing Cooperatives of China, led by the State Council, with an administrative level of ministerial level. It is a member of the International Cooperative Alliance (ICA).

== History ==
The All-China Federation of Supply and Marketing Cooperatives traces its origins to the former Central Cooperation Administration, founded by central government in November 1949.

The first representative conference of all cooperative workers in China was held in July 1950, and the conference passed documents such as the "Law of the People's Republic of China on Cooperatives (Draft)" (中华人民共和国合作社法（草案）) and the "Articles of Association of the All China Federation of Cooperatives (Draft)" (中华全国合作社联合总社章程（草案）). The All-China Federation of Cooperatives (中华全国合作社联合总社) was established, which unified the leadership and management of supply and marketing, production, fisheries, handicrafts, consumption, and credit cooperatives throughout the whole country.

The All-China Federation of Supply and Marketing Cooperatives became a member of the International Cooperative Alliance (ICA) on 14 August 1985.

== Subordinate organizations ==
=== Internal organizations of the council ===
- Office
- Research Room
- Human Resources Department
- Economic Development and Reform Department
- Finance and Accounting Department (Office of the Social Assets Management Committee)
- Cooperation Guidance Department (Legal Work Office)
- Financial Services Department
- International Cooperation Department
- Science and Education Club Department
- Agricultural Production Materials and Cotton and Hemp Bureau
- Party Committee of Directly Affiliated Organs
- Supervisory bureau
- Audit Bureau
- Retired Cadres Department

=== Internal organization of the supervisory board ===
- Office of the Supervisory Board

=== Directly affiliated public institutions ===
- China Cooperative Times
- Management Cadre College
- Technology Promotion Center
- Vocational Skills Appraisal and Guidance Center
- Information Center
- Audiovisual Center
- Commercial Printing Center
- Nanjing Institute for Comprehensive Utilization of Wild Plants
- Jinan Fruit Research Institute
- Hangzhou Tea Research Institute
- Zhengzhou Cotton and Hemp Engineering Technology Design and Research Institute
- Beijing Institute of Commercial Machinery
- Tianjin Institute of Renewable Resources
- Kunming Edible Fungi Research Institute
- Xi'an Institute of Lacquer Coatings

=== Directly affiliated enterprises ===
- China Agricultural Production Materials Group Corporation
- China Cotton Group Co., Ltd.
- China Renewable Resources Development Co., Ltd.
- New Cooperative Trade Chain Group Co., Ltd.
- China Supply and Marketing E-commerce Co., Ltd.
- Beijing National Cotton Trading Market Co., Ltd.
- China Supply and Marketing Agricultural Products Wholesale Market Holdings Co., Ltd.
- China Supply and Marketing Cold Chain Logistics Co., Ltd.
- China Supply and Marketing Benefiting Agriculture Service Effective Company
- China Supply and Marketing Grain and Oil Co., Ltd.
- Supply and Marketing Group Finance Co., Ltd.
- New Supply and Marketing Industry Development Fund Management Co., Ltd.

=== Social groups ===
- China Agricultural Means of Production Association
- China ASEAN Agricultural Materials Association
- China Cotton Association
- China Fruit Marketing Association
- China Tea Circulation Association
- China Edible Fungi Association
- China Renewable Resources Recycling and Utilization Association
- China Society of Supply and Marketing Cooperative Economics
- China Cotton and Hemp Circulation Economy Research Association
- Northeast Information Association

== List of leaders ==
=== Chairpersons ===
Name (English)	Name (Chinese)	Tenure begins	Tenure ends	Note
Bo Yibo	薄一波			
Cheng Zihua	程子华			
Cheng Zihua	程子华	July 1954	September 1958	
Chen Junsheng	陈俊生	May 1995	December 1998	
Bai Lichen	白立忱	January 1999	May 2008	
Li Chengyu	李成玉	May 2008	August 2011	
Yang Chuantang	杨传堂	August 2011	July 2012	
Wang Xia	王侠	March 2013	January 2019	
Liu Shiyu	刘士余	January 2019	May 2019	
Yu Hongqiu	喻红秋	November 2019	January 2021	
Liang Huiling	梁惠玲	July 2021	December 2022	
