= Gu Shu =

Chinese banker and politician

- 谷澍
- Born: August 1967 (age 59); China
- Education: Shanghai Jiao Tong University; Dongbei University of Finance and Economics; Shanghai University of Finance and Economics
- Occupation: Banker
- Years active: 2000–present
- Agents: Industrial and Commercial Bank of China; Agricultural Bank of China
- Political party: Chinese Communist Party

Gu Shu (Aseri) (Chinese: 谷澍; pinyin: Gǔ Shù; born August 1967) is a Chinese banker and politician, currently serving as party secretary and chairman of the Agricultural Bank of China. Previously he served as governor of the Industrial and Commercial Bank of China from 2016 to 2020.

He was a representative of the 19th National Congress of the Chinese Communist Party and is a representative of the 20th National Congress of the Chinese Communist Party, and is an alternate of the 20th Central Committee of the Chinese Communist Party.

== Biography ==
Gu was born in August 1967. He attended Shanghai Jiao Tong University where he received his Bachelor of Engineering degree in August 1990. After completing his Master of Management degree from Dongbei University of Finance and Economics in March 1995, he entered Shanghai University of Finance and Economics where he obtained his Doctor of Management degree in March 1998. From September 2002 to September 2003, he worked as a visiting scholar at the University of Pennsylvania.

Starting in 1998, he served in several posts in the Industrial and Commercial Bank of China, including deputy director and director of the Settlement Department, deputy general manager of the Settlement Department, deputy general manager of the Planning and Finance Department, general manager of the Finance and Accounting Department, secretary of the board of directors and general manager of the Strategic Management and Investor Relations Department. He became party secretary and president of the Shandong Branch in November 2010. He moved up the ranks to become vice governor in October 2013 and governor in September 2016. He was the youngest governor of China's state-owned banks at that time.

Gu was appointed party secretary of the Agricultural Bank of China in December 2020, in addition to serving as chairman since January 2021.

Business positions
Preceded by Yi Huiman	Governor of the Industrial and Commercial Bank of China; 2016–2020	Succeeded by Liao Lin
Preceded by Zhou Mubing	Chairman of the Agricultural Bank of China; 2021–	Incumbent
