= Zhou Xiaochuan =

Chinese economist (born 1948)

- 周小川
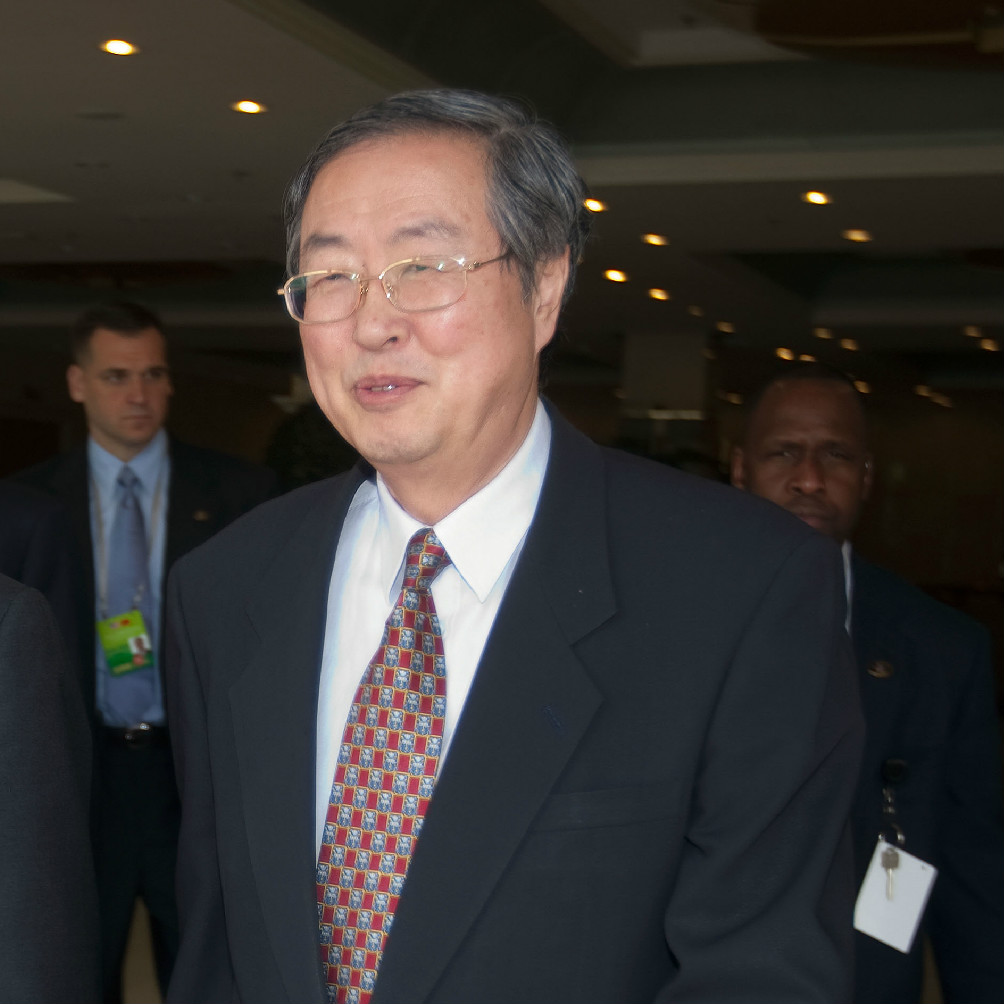

Vice Chairman of the Chinese People's Political Consultative Conference
- In office 11 March 2013 – 14 March 2018
- Chairman: Yu Zhengsheng

Governor of the People's Bank of China
- In office 28 December 2002 – 19 March 2018
- Premier: Zhu Rongji; Wen Jiabao; Li Keqiang
- Preceded by: Dai Xianglong
- Succeeded by: Yi Gang

Chairman of the China Securities Regulatory Commission
- In office 24 February 2000 – 26 December 2002
- Premier: Zhu Rongji
- Preceded by: Zhou Zhengqing
- Succeeded by: Shang Fulin

Personal details
- Born: 29 January 1948 (age 78) Yixing, Jiangsu, Republic of China
- Party: Chinese Communist Party
- Parent: Zhou Jiannan (father)
- Relatives: Zhou Yunfan (nephew)
- Education: Beijing University of Chemical Technology; Tsinghua University
- Occupation: Banker; Economist
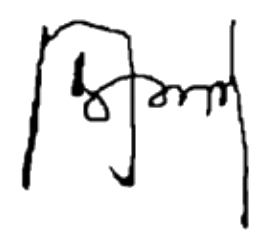
- Signature

Zhou Xiaochuan (Chinese: 周小川; pinyin: Zhōu Xiǎochuān; born 29 January 1948) is a Chinese economist. Zhou served as the governor of the People's Bank of China from 2002 to 2018.

Zhou previously served as vice governor of the People's Bank of China, director of the State Administration of Foreign Exchange, governor of China Construction Bank, and chairman of the China Securities Regulatory Commission. He retired in 2018.

== Early life and education ==
Born in Yixing, Jiangsu province, he was the son of Zhou Jiannan and Yang Weizhe (杨维哲). The elder Zhou was the head of the Electric and Industrial Bureau of the North East district in 1949. He later became Vice Minister of the First Department of Machinery Development in 1961. During the Cultural Revolution, Zhou Xiaochuan joined the Production and Construction Corps in Heilongjiang province while his father was persecuted.

Zhou Xiaochuan graduated from Beijing Institute of Chemical Technology (now Beijing University of Chemical Technology) in 1975 and received a Ph.D. degree in Automation and Systems Engineering from Tsinghua University in 1985. From 1987 to 1988, he was a visiting scholar at the University of California, Santa Cruz, US.

== Career ==
During the early days of the Cultural Revolution, he worked at a Production and Construction Corps in Heilongjiang province from 1968 to 1972. He was sent to the Beijing Institute of Chemical Technology as a Gong Nong Bing student (students selected from workers, farmers, and military, a common practice of college admissions in the Cultural Revolution) in 1972. After graduating from college in 1976, he was assigned to the Beijing Research Center of Automation as an engineer studying large automation systems. Between 1978 and 1985, he was studying for a master's degree in Industrial Application of System Engineering at the China Academy of Machinery Science and Technology and a Ph.D. in Science at Tsinghua University.

In 1986, he started working in the State Council of the People's Republic of China on economic restructuring as a member of the Economic Policy Group of the State Council and Deputy Director of the Institute of Chinese Economic Reform Research. He served as Assistant Minister of Foreign Trade from 1986 to 1989, and between 1986 and 1991, he was also a member of the National Committee of Economic Reform. Before the 1989 Tiananmen Square protests and massacre, Zhou was an associate and protégé of Zhao Ziyang, General Secretary of the Chinese Communist Party. According to Michael Pillsbury, Zhou is a conservative who rejected the Russian model of privatization and political reforms (favored by reformers) and opted for maintaining the Chinese Communist Party's political control while allowing state-owned enterprises to be subjected to market reforms.

From 1991 to 1995, he was the executive director and vice president of the Bank of China. In 1995, he assumed the position of Administrator of the State Administration of Foreign Exchange. In 1996 to 1998, he served both as Deputy Governor of the People's Bank of China and Administrator of the State Administration of Foreign Exchange. In 1998 to 2000, he served as president of the China Construction Bank and oversaw the creation of asset-management companies charged with working out the banking system's bad debt.

From 2000 to 2002, Zhou was the chairman of the China Securities Regulatory Commission. While there, he earned the nickname Zhou "Bapi" (周扒皮), Zhou "the flayer". In July 2001, Zhou declared his intention to reduce state ownership in the stock market. The stock market freefall, leading him to abandon his plan that October. He emphasized the role of market mechanisms and worked to reduce red tape to protect retail investors.

=== People's Bank of China ===
In December 2002, he was appointed to his present position by Premier Zhu Rongji as governor of the People's Bank of China and also took over the position of chairman of the monetary policy committee of the People's Bank of China from January 2003. He was the governor of the bank until 2018. Zhou was in charge of clearing up some $865 billion of bad loans in the Chinese banking system.

Zhou has published a dozen monographs and over one hundred academic articles in Chinese and international journals, including "Rebuilding the Relationship between the Enterprise and the Bank" and "Social Security: Reform and Policy Recommendations" and his book Marching toward an Open Economic System.

Zhou contended that China's policy banks should separate their different kinds of businesses. Writing in Qiushi in 2005, Zhou contended that (1) each policy bank should be repositioned and regulated in its own way and that (2) policy banks should separate and separately manage state-led projects and self-run projects. Although there were some attempts to implement these ideas, little advancement was made due to the differing views of institutions like the National Development and Reform Commission, the Ministry of Finance, and the China Banking Regulatory Commission.

=== After the financial crisis ===
On 24 March 2009, Zhou gave a speech, "Reform the International Monetary System". He argued that the ongoing financial crisis was made more severe by inherent weaknesses of the current international monetary system and called for a gradual move towards using IMF special drawing rights (SDRs) as a centrally managed global reserve currency. He argued that it would address the inadequacies of using a national currency as a global reserve currency, particularly the Triffin dilemma, the dilemma faced by issuing countries in trying to simultaneously achieve their domestic monetary policy goals and meet other countries' demand for reserve currency.

Zhou argued that it was regrettable that John Maynard Keynes's "farsighted" bancor proposal was not adopted at Bretton Woods in the 1940s. Zhou also asserted China's increasing confidence in its own financial governance philosophies. He criticized Western leaders for letting their banking sectors go astray by loose regulations. In April 2011, Zhao publicly stated that China's foreign reserves had become excessive and recommended that reserves be reduced by instead capitalizing sovereign funds.

=== Third term ===
In March 2013, Zhou was reappointed the governor of the People's Bank of China. His reappointment came as "China's newly installed political chiefs - headed by Communist Party general secretary Xi Jinping and Premier Li Keqiang." Earlier in Zhou's career, "as a protege of former Premier Zhu Rongji, [Zhou] helped draw up the blueprint to wean the economy off central planning."

During a 5 March 2013 meeting of the National People's Congress and the Chinese People's Political Consultative Conference, Zhou announced that the People's Bank of China would deal with the "ramifications of the excessive money supply and will gradually control the new money supply" because of the 2008 fourth quarter financial crisis.

In September 2015, Zhou addressed the G-20 finance meeting in Ankara about the sharp, sustained drop in the Chinese stock market in 2015 and said that the "correction in the stock market is almost done."

In October 2017, Zhou named three reforms he believed were crucial for China's economic future: scrapping capital account controls, letting the market freely decide the yuan's value and embracing free trade and investment.

Government offices
Preceded by Dai Xianglong	Governor of the People's Bank of China; 2003–2018	Succeeded by Yi Gang
