= Liu Shiyu =

Chinese politician and banker (born 1961)

- 刘士余

Chairman of All-China Federation of Supply and Marketing Cooperatives
- In office 26 January 2019 – 19 May 2019
- Preceded by: Wang Xia
- Succeeded by: Yu Hongqiu

Chairman of the China Securities Regulatory Commission
- In office 20 February 2016 – 26 January 2019
- Preceded by: Xiao Gang
- Succeeded by: Yi Huiman

Chairman of Agricultural Bank of China
- In office 5 December 2014 – 20 February 2016
- Preceded by: Jiang Chaoliang
- Succeeded by: Zhou Mubing

Personal details
- Born: November 1961 (age 64) Guanyun County, Jiangsu, China
- Party: Chinese Communist Party
- Education: Tsinghua University
- Occupation: Politician, economist

Chinese name
- Traditional Chinese: 劉士餘
- Simplified Chinese: 刘士余
Transcriptions
Standard Mandarin
- Hanyu Pinyin: Liú Shìyú

Liu Shiyu (Chinese: 刘士余; born November 1961) is a Chinese banker and former public official. He was best known for his term as head of the China Securities Regulatory Commission between 2016 and 2018. Liu previously served as President of the Agricultural Bank of China from 2014 to 2016. He turned himself into the authorities for disciplinary violations in 2019, and was demoted given a party membership suspension. At the time, he was serving as Chairman of the All-China Federation of Supply and Marketing Cooperatives. Liu was the second ministerial-level official to hand in to anti-corruption authorities since the 18th National Congress of the Chinese Communist Party in late 2012.

== Biography ==
Liu was born in Guanyun County, Jiangsu. He graduated from Tsinghua University initially in hydraulic engineering, then and received a master's combined degree in engineering and management, and a doctorate in economics. Between 1987 and 1996, he worked for the Shanghai municipal economic structural reform office, then the National Office of Structural Reform, before being transferred to the China Construction Bank (CCB). At CCB, Liu was rapidly promoted to more senior roles, working in its Banking Supervision Department. In 2002 he began heading the administrative office of the People's Bank of China, and in July 2004, was named Assistant to the Governor, finally being promoted to Deputy Governor in June 2006.

In October 2014, he became the Communist Party Secretary (i.e. top leader) of the Agricultural Bank of China. In February 2016, he was named chairman of the China Securities Regulatory Commission. He was tapped for the role upon the dismissal of Xiao Gang, after a tumultuous year in the Chinese stock market that led to huge investor losses. At the CSRC, Liu was known to have decreased the backlog of approvals for companies awaiting IPO on China's stock markets. In January 2019, he was named Chairman of All-China Federation of Supply and Marketing Cooperatives, replacing Wang Xia.

== Investigation ==
On May 19, 2019, Liu was placed under investigation by the Central Commission for Discipline Inspection (CCDI), the party's internal disciplinary body, and the National Supervisory Commission, the highest anti-corruption agency of China.

On October 4, 2019, the Central Commission for Discipline Inspection said in a statement that Liu was found to have severely violated political discipline and political rules, received gifts and used his power and position to seek personal gain for others, made illegal arrangements for others to work in the financial system and job promotion. Liu was placed on two-year probation within the Party, and demoted to first-level investigator (一级调研员), a non-leading position somewhat equivalent to the official of section rank (正处级; zhengchuji). He was removed from membership of the 19th National Congress of the Chinese Communist Party.

Business positions
Preceded by Jiang Chaoliang	Chairman of Agricultural Bank of China; 2014-2016	Next: Zhou Mubing (周慕冰)
Government offices
Preceded by Xiao Gang	Chairman of the China Securities Regulatory Commission; 2016–2018	Succeeded by Yi Huiman
Civic offices
Preceded by Wang Xia (王侠)	Chairman of All-China Federation of Supply and Marketing Cooperatives; 2019-2019	Succeeded by Yu Hongqiu
