= Zhou Jiannan =

Chinese politician (1917–1995)

Zhou Jiannan (Chinese: 周建南; pinyin: Zhōu Jiànnán; 1917−1995) was a Chinese politician.

== Biography ==
Zhou was born the third of four sons in Yixing, Jiangsu province. He graduated from Shanghai Jiao Tong University in 1937. After the outbreak of the Second Sino-Japanese War, Zhou left Shanghai. By the end of the year, he reached the revolutionary base of Yan'an and joined the Communist Party. In August 1938 he was sent to Chongqing to conduct guerrilla warfare.

In the 1980s, he acted as a mentor to Jiang Zemin.

Zhou Jiannan was the father of Zhou Xiaochuan, former governor of the People's Bank of China.
