= Han Jin (businessman) =

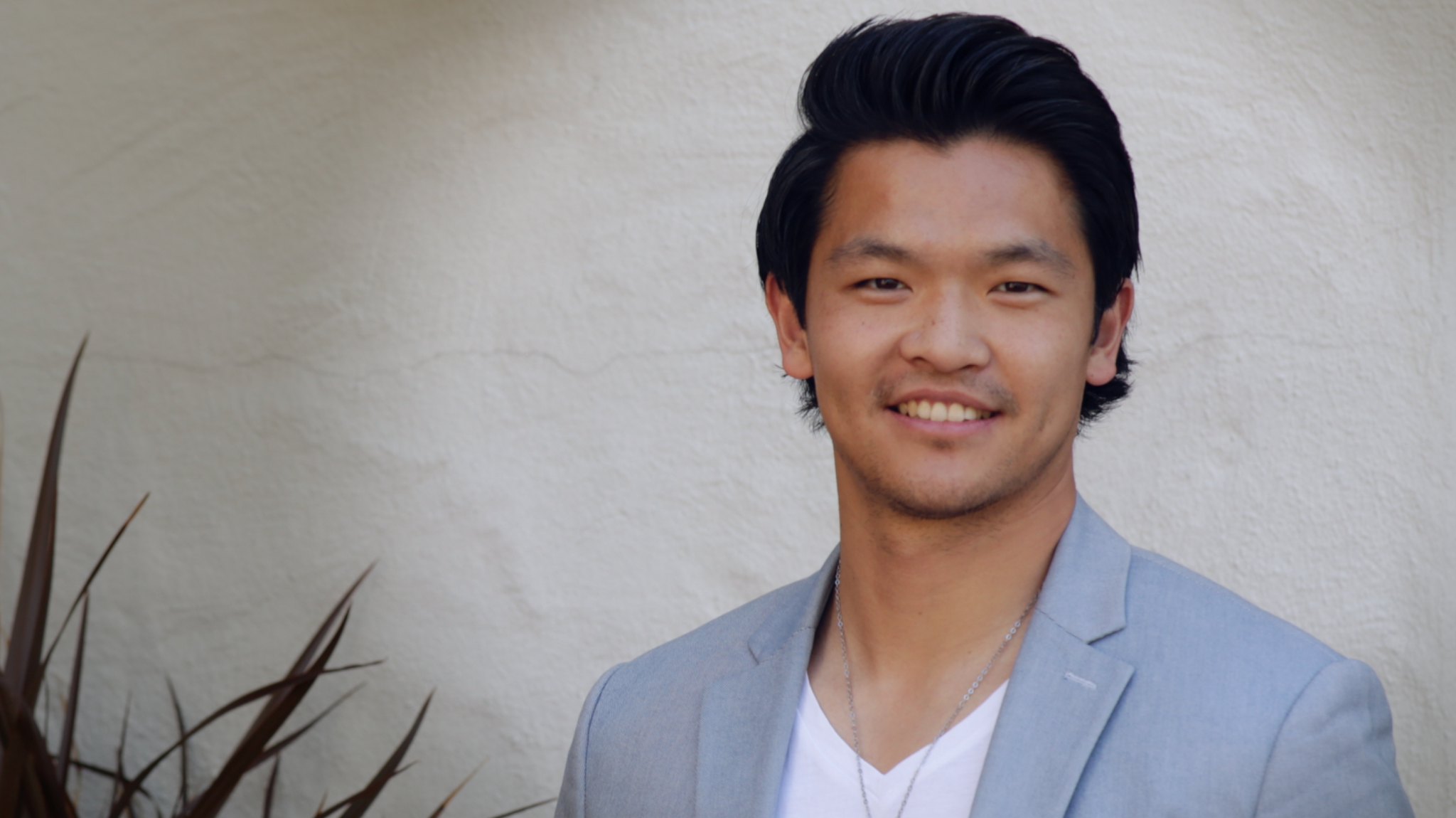
- Born: October 15, 1988 (age 37); China
- Education: University of California, Berkeley
- Occupation: Entrepreneur
- Title: Co-founder and CEO of Lucid

Han Jin (/han ʤɪn/; born October 15, 1988) is co-founder, CEO, and product architect of Lucid VR Inc. (Lucid), a Santa Clara, California-based startup.

== Education and career ==
Jin was born in China and grew up in Germany. He attended the University of California Berkeley as a graduate student, then worked at flash memory company SanDisk. While at SanDisk he applied for an O-1 visa, after which he left SanDisk to start Lucid.

== Companies ==
Jin co-founded Lucid in January 2015 with the company's chief technical officer, Adam Rowell. The company's flagship product was a high definition camera, the LucidCam. Jin and Rowell went on to found Bluwhale in 2022, an AI Web3 company.

== Recognition ==
In 2017, Jin was on the cover of the May issue of Inc. as part of the magazine's “30 Under 30” feature. Forbes listed Jin as one of the Forbes 30 Under 30 in consumer technology in November 2017. In order to make the Forbes list, according to The Information, Jin quizzed previous honorees for tips and "begged as many as 30 people, including family members, to nominate him." In 2018, Jin was awarded the gold trophy in the Stevie Awards for Entrepreneur of the Year - Computer Software - Up to 500 Employees.
