= Securities Daily =

Chinese state-owned newspaper

- Type: Daily newspaper
- Founded: 18 October 2000
- Headquarters: Beijing
- OCLC number: 123265644
- Website: zqrb.com.cn www.zqrb.cn

Securities Daily
- Simplified Chinese: 证券日报
- Traditional Chinese: 證券日報
Transcriptions
Standard Mandarin
- Hanyu Pinyin: Zhèngquàn rìbào

Securities Daily (simplified Chinese: 证券日报; traditional Chinese: 證券日報; pinyin: Zhèngquàn Rìbào) is a Beijing-based securities newspaper sponsored by the Economic Daily Press Group. It is published in Chinese by the Securities Daily Office, and is publicly distributed in all of China. The newspaper was officially launched on 18 October 2000.

Securities Daily is one of the media outlets authorised by the China Securities Regulatory Commission to issue public disclosures. It is one of the four major securities newspapers in China.
