= China Securities Investor Protection Fund =

Financial body in China

The China Securities Investor Protection Fund Corporation Limited (SIPF) is a wholly state-owned corporation under the authority of the China Securities Regulatory Commission (CSRC). It was established on 30 August 2005.

== Overview ==
The SIPF was initially funded directly by the State Council, and later pivoted to financing from multiple sources: fees based on transactions taking place on the Shanghai Stock Exchange and Shenzhen Stock Exchange, fees paid by securities companies, interest earnings on escrow accounts of issuers of equities and bonds, and recoveries from the liquidation of failed securities companies. The policy rules relating to its operation are formulated jointly by the CSRC, the Ministry of Finance, and the People's Bank of China.

The SIPF has rules that protect the cash of investors in the event of failure of a securities intermediary. It is also involved in efforts of investor education and financial literacy. It indemnifies creditors of a securities company if the company is cancelled, closed, goes into bankruptcy, or is subject to compulsory regulatory measures of CSRC including administrative takeover or management by an administrator. SIPF fully compensates all losses in the settlement account of the failed company (loss of margin); losses incurred by individuals as a result of the company's failure are fully compensated up to of RMB 100,000, with a discount above that amount.

== See also ==
- National Financial Regulatory Administration
