= Beijing Stock Exchange =

Stock exchange in Beijing, China

- 北京证券交易所

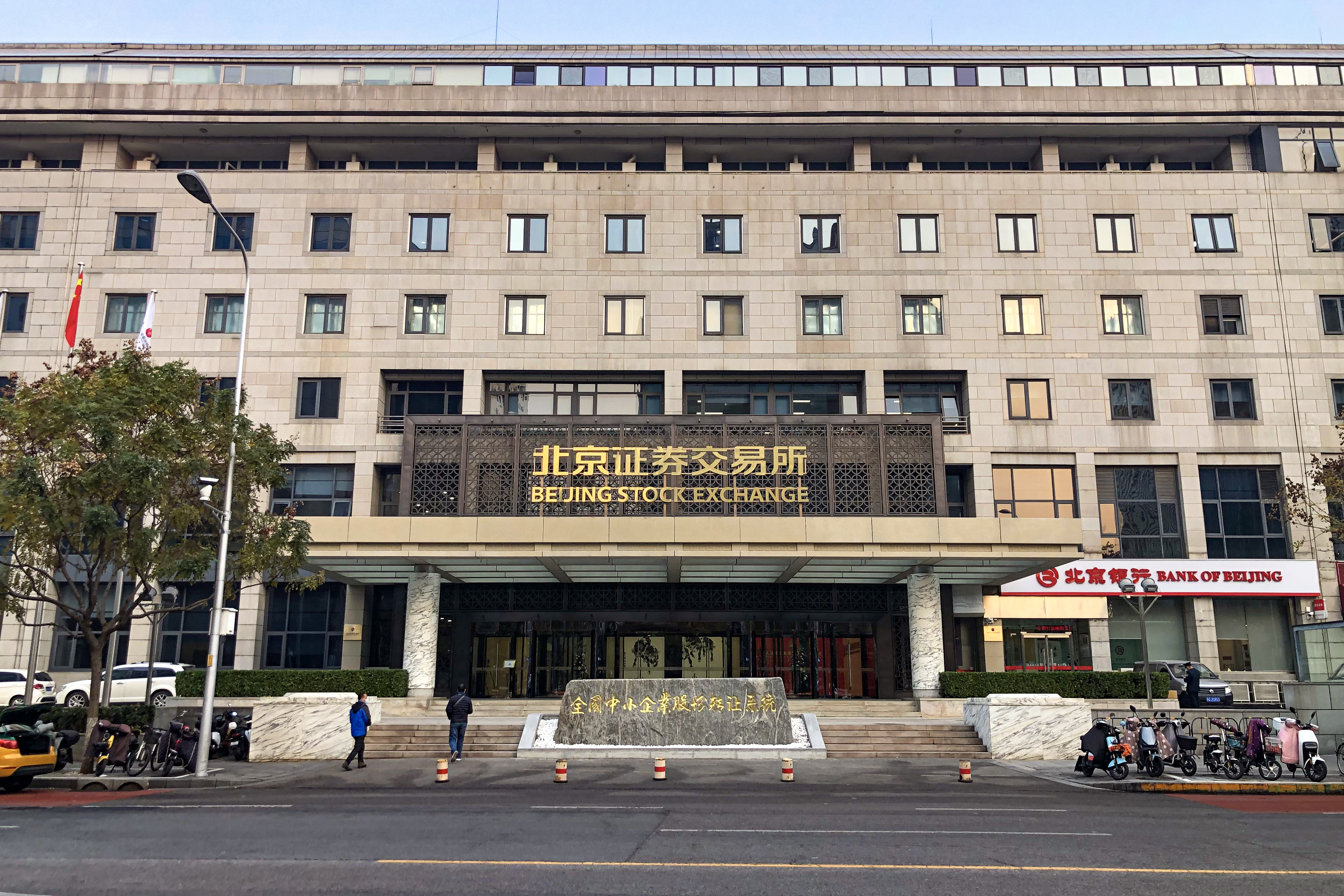
- Type: Stock Exchange
- Location: Xicheng District, Beijing, China
- Founded: 3 September 2021; 5 years ago
- Owner: National Equities Exchange and Quotations (100%)
- Currency: CNY
- No. of listings: 294 (February 2026)
- Market cap: ¥942 billion ($138 billion) (May 2026)
- Website: www.bse.cn

The Beijing Stock Exchange (BSE; simplified Chinese: 北京证券交易所; traditional Chinese: 北京證券交易所; pinyin: Běijīng Zhèngquàn Jiāoyì Suǒ) is a stock exchange based in Beijing, China. It is one of the three stock exchanges operating independently of each other in mainland China, the others being the Shanghai Stock Exchange and the Shenzhen Stock Exchange.

== History ==
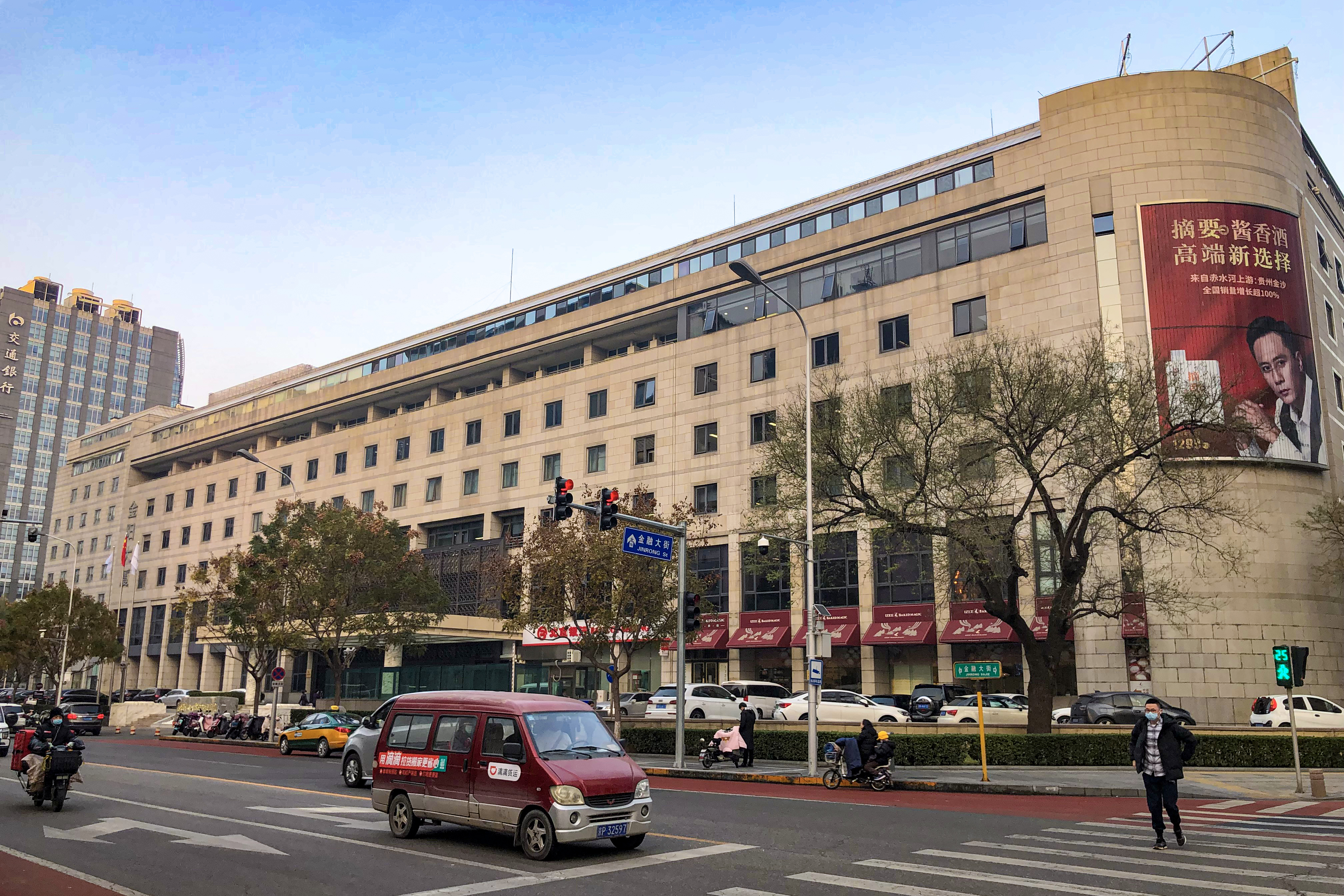
Jinyang Mansion which houses the BSE

The Beijing municipal government had lobbied for years to upgrade the National Equities Exchange and Quotations (NEEQ) exchange (nicknamed "The New Third Board", 新三板) to act as a home for US-listed Chinese firms.

On 2 September 2021, General Secretary of the Chinese Communist Party Xi Jinping announced the establishment of the Beijing Stock Exchange (BSE). The purpose was to help serve small and medium-sized enterprises (SMEs) in China.

This was accomplished by reforming the NEEQ exchange and establishing up the BSE as the primary platform for SMEs. As of 2020, the NEEQ exchange had almost 6,000 companies listed, with most of them being SMEs.

On 3 September 2021, Beijing Stock Exchange Co., Ltd. completed its business registration as a company. The registration information showed that NEEQ was the sole shareholder, making it the owner of the BSE. The registered capital was RMB 1 billion, and the registered address was the same as NEEQ's.

On 17 September 2021, the BSE issued guidelines on the qualifying criteria for investors.

On 30 October 2021, the China Securities Regulatory Commission published rules for the exchange regarding initial public offerings (IPO), refinancing, and supervision.

On 15 November 2021, trading on the BSE commenced. 81 companies debuted trading on the exchange that day: 71 were transferred from the "Select tier" of the NEEQ exchange, while the remaining 10 held their trading debuts.

== Rules ==
- Individual investors are required to have securities assets of at least RMB 500,000 and at least two years of experience in securities investing to qualify for trading on the bourse.
- Institutional investors are not subject to capital requirements.
- On the debut trading day of a stock, there is no limit on a stock's price change. Trading will be temporarily suspended for 10 minutes if the stock's price rises above 30% or drops over 60%.
- After the first trading day, stocks traded on the exchange will not be allowed to rise or fall more than 30% within a single trading day.

== See also ==
- China Securities Regulatory Commission
- Economy of China
- Hong Kong Stock Exchange
- Shanghai Stock Exchange
- Shenzhen Stock Exchange

=== Lists ===
- List of Chinese companies
- List of companies in the People's Republic of China
- List of stock exchanges
