= Shanghai Financial Post =

Shanghai-based Chinese-language financial newspaper[

- Type: Daily newspaper
- Founded: July 1, 1992
- Ceased publication: January 1, 2020
- Website: shfinancialnews.com www.sfnews.sh.cn

The Shanghai Financial Post (Chinese: 上海金融报), or Shanghai jinrong bao, commonly known as Shanghai Financial News, was a Shanghai-based Chinese-language financial newspaper published in China. The newspaper was sponsored by the Shanghai Branch of the People's Bank of China (中国人民银行上海分行) on July 1, 1992.

== History ==
Shanghai Financial Post was founded July 1, 1992. It began publishing color newspapers in 2000. On January 1, 2020, the newspaper ceased publication.
