= China Banking Regulatory Commission =

Agency of the People's Republic of China

- 中国银行业监督管理委员会

Agency overview
- Jurisdiction: National
- Headquarters: Beijing
- Agency executive: Guo Shuqing, Chairman
- Parent agency: State Council
- Website: cbrc.gov.cn

The China Banking Regulatory Commission (CBRC) was an agency of the People's Republic of China (PRC) authorised by the State Council to regulate the banking sector of the PRC except the territories of Hong Kong and Macau, both of which are special administrative regions.

== History ==
In 1998, the Communist Party established the Central Financial Work Commission to be the implementing body for financial policies, coordinating regulatory agencies in the financial sector, conducting investigations and disciplinary inspections, and making personnel recommendations. In 2002, the commission was dissolved and most of its functions transferred to the newly created China Banking Regulatory Commission (CBRC).

In response to their swelling debt loads, undercapitalization and non-transparent business practices, the government of China recapitalized the banks and set up the CBRC as the country's independent banking regulator in 2003. Liu Mingkang was appointed its first chairman and served until 2011, when he was replaced by Shang Fulin. In 2017, Shang was replaced by Guo Shuqing as the new chairman.

Active in developing policies to promote financial inclusion, the Bank is a member of the Alliance for Financial Inclusion.

In April 2018, as part of the deepening the reform of the Party and state institutions, the China Banking Regulatory Commission was merged with the China Insurance Regulatory Commission to form the China Banking and Insurance Regulatory Commission.

== See also ==
- China Securities Journal
