= Shanghai Securities Journal =

Chinese state-owned newspaper

- Type: China's state-owned newspaper
- Founded: July 1, 1991
- Headquarters: Shanghai
- OCLC number: 47623086
- Website: cnstock.com

Shanghai Securities Journal
- Simplified Chinese: 上海证券报
- Traditional Chinese: 上海證券報
Transcriptions
Standard Mandarin
- Hanyu Pinyin: Shànghǎi Zhèngquàn Bào

The Shanghai Securities Journal (abbreviated as SSJ; 上海证券报; 上海證券報), or Shanghai Securities Post, officially titled as Shanghai Securities News, is a national securities daily newspaper in China, with headquarters in Shanghai. It is a China's state-owned newspaper with the official website at cnstock.com.

== History ==
Shanghai Securities Journal was launched on July 1, 1991 (internal circulation), and it has been openly issued in China and abroad since January 1, 1993. In March 2018, Shanghai Securities Journal won the 3rd National Top 100 Publications in China.
