= Shang Fulin =

Chinese politician

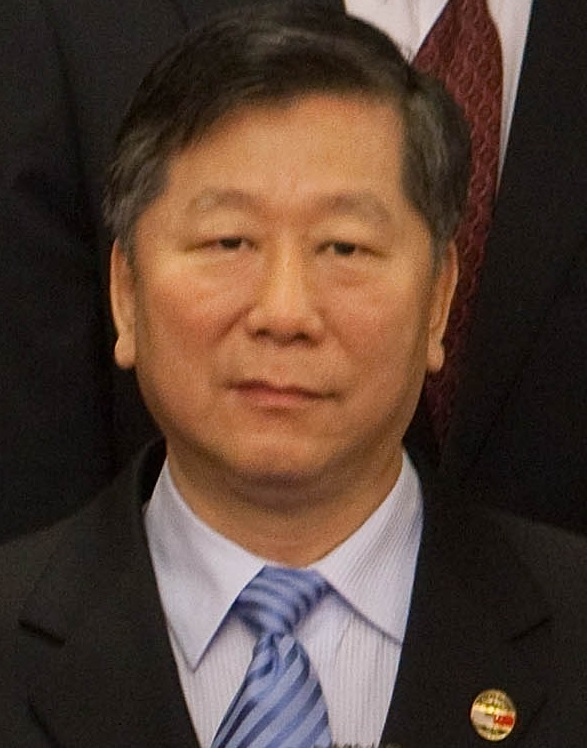
Shang Fulin, then Chairman of China Securities Regulatory Commission, 2010

Shang Fulin (Chinese: 尚福林; born November 13, 1951) is a politician of the People's Republic of China. He served as president of the China Securities Regulatory Commission until October 2011, when he was appointed to lead the China Banking Regulatory Commission.

== Biography ==
Shang was born in Jinan, Shandong. He served in the army from 1969 to 1973, and joined the Chinese Communist Party (CCP) in July 1971. From 1973 to 1978, he served in Beijing Yingtaoyuan branch of People's Bank of China. Shang studied at Beijing Institute of Finance and Trade from 1978 to 1982, and he holds a Ph.D. in Finance from Southwestern University of Finance and Economics. From 1982 to 1990, he served in the general planning section of the headquarters of People's Bank of China. In 1994, he became the president assistant of the Bank, and was promoted to vice president of the Bank in April 1996, responsible for monetary policy and liquidity. In July 1997, Shang was elected a member of monetary policy commission of the People's Bank of China. In February 2002, he was appointed as the president of Agricultural Bank of China. Since December 27, 2002, Shang has succeeded Zhou Xiaochuan and served as the president and the Party chief of China Securities Regulatory Commission.

Shang was an alternate of 16th Central Committee of the CCP, and was a full member of 17th and 18th Central Committees.
