= Wu Qing (politician, born 1965) =

Chinese politician (born 1965)

- 吴清
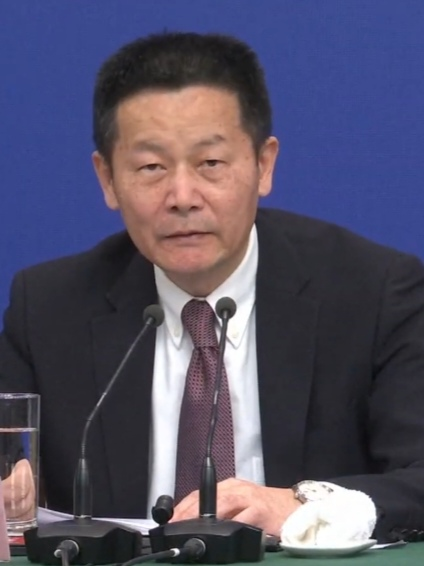
- Wu in 2024

Chairman of the China Securities Regulatory Commission
- Incumbent
- Assumed office 7 February 2024
- Premier: Li Qiang
- Preceded by: Yi Huiman

Personal details
- Born: April 1965 (age 61) Mengcheng County, Anhui, China
- Party: Chinese Communist Party
- Education: Shanghai University of Finance and Economics

Chinese name
- Simplified Chinese: 吴清
- Traditional Chinese: 吳清
Transcriptions
Standard Mandarin
- Hanyu Pinyin: Wú Qīng

Wu Qing (Chinese: 吴清; born April 1965) is a Chinese politician currently serving as chairman of the China Securities Regulatory Commission, in office since 7 February 2024. He is a representative of the 20th National Congress of the Chinese Communist Party and an alternate of the 20th Central Committee of the Chinese Communist Party.

== Early life and education ==
Wu was born in Mengcheng County, Anhui, in April 1965.

== Career ==
=== Central government ===
After graduating from Shanghai University of Finance and Economics in 1987, he was despatched to the State Planning Commission (now National Development and Reform Commission) and later entered the China Securities Regulatory Commission. In 2005, he became director of the Risk Disposal Office. During his tenure, he had dealt with 31 non compliant securities companies and is known as the "Broker Butcher" (券商屠夫) in the securities industry. In March 2009, he was transferred to the position of director of the Fund Supervision Department.

=== Shanghai ===
In November 2010, he was named acting governor of Hongkou District in Shanghai, confirmed in January 2011. He also served as deputy party secretary of the district. In July 2013, he rose to become party secretary, the top political position in the district.

In May 2016, he was appointed president and party secretary of the Shanghai Stock Exchange, a position at vice-ministerial level.

In January 2018, he was made vice mayor of Shanghai and in September 2019 was admitted to member of the CCP Shanghai Municipal Committee, the city's top authority. He also served as director of the Office for Promoting the Construction of Science and Technology Innovation Centers and director of the Zhangjiang Hi-Tech Park. In December 2021, he was elevated to executive vice mayor. On 21 July 2023, he was appointed deputy party secretary of Shanghai, in addition to serving as secretary of the Political and Legal Affairs Commission.

=== Central government ===
On 7 February 2024, he was chosen as chairman of the China Securities Regulatory Commission, succeeding Yi Huiman.

Government offices
| Preceded by Song Liping | Director of the Institutional Supervision Department of the China Securities Regulatory Commission; 2002–2005 | Succeeded by Huang Hongyuan |
| New title | Director of the Risk Disposal Office of Securities Companies under the China Securities Regulatory Commission; 2005–2009 | Succeeded by Huang Hongyuan |
| Preceded by Li Zhengqiang | Director of the Fund Supervision Department of the China Securities Regulatory Commission; 2009–2010 | Succeeded by Wang Lin |
| Preceded by Yu Beihua | Governor of Hongkou District; 2010–2013 | Succeeded by Cao Liqiang |
| Preceded by Chen Yin | Executive Vice Mayor of Shanghai; 2021–2023 | Succeeded by TBA |
| Preceded by Yi Huiman | Chairman of the China Securities Regulatory Commission; 2024–present | Incumbent |
Party political offices
| Preceded by Sun Jianping | Communist Party Secretary of Hongkou District; 2013–2016 | Succeeded by Wu Xinbao |
| Preceded by Zhuge Yujie | Secretary of the Political and Legal Affairs Commission of the Shanghai Municipal Committee of the Chinese Communist Party; 2023–2024 | Succeeded by TBA |
| Preceded by Zhuge Yujie | Deputy Communist Party Secretary of Shanghai; 2023–2024 | Succeeded by TBA |
Civic offices
| Preceded by Gui Minjie | President of the Shanghai Stock Exchange; 2016–2017 | Succeeded by Huang Hongyuan |
