= Yi Huiman =

Chinese politician (born 1964)

- 易会满
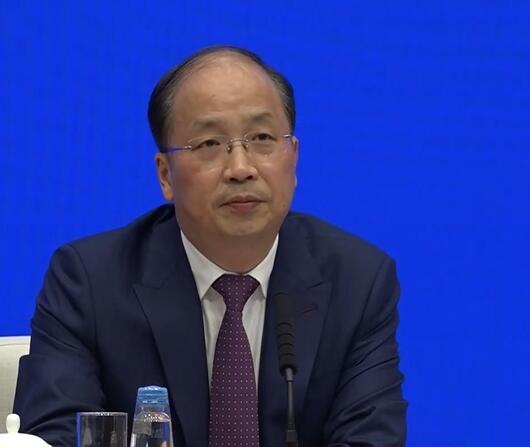
- Yi in 2019

Chairman of the China Securities Regulatory Commission
- In office 26 January 2019 – 7 February 2024
- Premier: Li Keqiang; Li Qiang
- Preceded by: Liu Shiyu
- Succeeded by: Wu Qing

Chairman of the Board of the Industrial and Commercial Bank of China
- In office September 2016 – 26 January 2019
- Preceded by: Jiang Jianqing
- Succeeded by: Chen Siqing

President of the Industrial and Commercial Bank of China
- In office May 2013 – September 2016
- Preceded by: Yang Kaisheng
- Succeeded by: Gu Shu

Personal details
- Born: 19 December 1964 (age 61) Cangnan County, Zhejiang, China
- Party: Chinese Communist Party (expelled in 2026)
- Education: Hangzhou Dianzi University; Peking University; Nanjing University

Chinese name
- Simplified Chinese: 易会满
- Traditional Chinese: 易會滿
Transcriptions
Standard Mandarin
- Hanyu Pinyin: Yì Huìmǎn

Yi Huiman (Chinese: 易会满; born 19 December 1964) is a Chinese banker who served as chairman of the China Securities Regulatory Commission from 2019 to 2024. He is the former chairman of the Industrial and Commercial Bank of China.

== Early life and education ==
Yi was born in Cangnan County, Zhejiang and graduated from Hangzhou Dianzi University with an associate degree in statistics.

== Career ==
Beginning in 1985, he served in several posts in the Industrial and Commercial Bank of China, including vice president of Zhejiang Branch (1998), president of Jiangsu Branch (2000), and president of Beijing Branch (2005). In May 2008, he became vice president of the bank, rising to president in May 2013. He rose to become chairman of the board of the Industrial and Commercial Bank of China in September 2016, succeeding Jiang Jianqing. He was appointed as the chairman of the China Securities Regulatory Commission (CSRC) on 26 January 2019. He was removed from the post on 7 February 2024. On 6 June 2024, he was appointed as a member of the 14th Chinese People's Political Consultative Conference and a deputy director of the Committee for Economic Affairs.

He was an alternate of the 19th Central Committee and is a member of the 20th Central Committee.

== Investigation ==
On 6 September 2025, Yi was put under investigation for alleged "serious violations of discipline and laws" by the Central Commission for Discipline Inspection (CCDI), the party's internal disciplinary body, and the National Supervisory Commission, the highest anti-corruption agency of China. Yi was expelled from the party and dismissed from public office on 30 April 2026. On 29 October 2026, the fifth plenary session of the 20th CCP Central Committee reviewed and approved the report of the CCDI on the "serious violations of discipline and law" by Yi and confirmed the Politburo decision to expel him from the CCP.

Business positions
| Preceded by Yang Kaisheng | President of the Industrial and Commercial Bank of China; 2013–2016 | Succeeded by Gu Shu |
| Preceded by Jiang Jianqing | Chairman of the Board of the Industrial and Commercial Bank of China; 2016–2019 | Succeeded by Chen Siqing |
Government offices
| Preceded by Liu Shiyu | Chairman of the China Securities Regulatory Commission; 2019–2024 | Succeeded by Wu Qing |
