= China Insurance Regulatory Commission =

Former Chinese regulatory agency

- 中国保险监督管理委员会

Agency overview
- Formed: November 8, 1998
- Preceding agency: Insurance Department of the People's Bank of China
- Dissolved: November 26, 2018
- Superseding agency: China Banking and Insurance Regulatory Commission
- Jurisdiction: National
- Headquarters: Beijing
- Agency executive: Xiang Junbo, Chairman
- Parent agency: State Council
- Website: circ.gov.cn

China Insurance Regulatory Commission
- Simplified Chinese: 中国保险监督管理委员会
- Traditional Chinese: 中國保險監督管理委員會
Transcriptions
Standard Mandarin
- Hanyu Pinyin: Zhōngguó Bǎoxiǎn Jiāndū Guǎnlǐ Wěiyuánhuì

The China Insurance Regulatory Commission (CIRC) was an agency of China authorized by the State Council to regulate the Chinese insurance products and services market and maintain legal and stable operations of insurance industry.

== History ==
It was founded on November 18, 1998, upgraded from a semi-ministerial to a ministerial institution in 2003, and currently has 31 local offices in every province.

On 17 March 2018, the 13th National People's Congress announced a plan to overhaul China's financial regulatory system as part of the deepening the reform of the Party and state institutions. The China Insurance Regulatory Commission (CIRC), and the banking regulator, the China Banking Regulatory Commission (CBRC), were merged into the China Banking and Insurance Regulatory Commission (CBIRC) with an aim to resolve problems such as unclear responsibilities and cross-regulation. The CBIRC was officially established on 8 April 2018.

== Functions ==
The main functions of the CIRC were:

#	Functions	Descriptions
1.	Formulate policies for developing the insurance industry	Create laws, rules and regulations to supervise the industry
2.	Scrutinise and approval of insurance companies, subsidiaries, insurance holding companies	Approve and examine incorporation of insurance entities, merge, split, change or dissolve
3.	Examine and approve the qualifications of managers of various insurance companies	Accreditation, regulate the hiring of senior managers in various insurance companies
4.	Pricing regulation, insurance schemes	Regulate premiums, new insurance products and categories
5.	Supervise the financial health of insurance companies	Ensure payment ability, insurance deposit, insurance guarantee fund
6.	Supervise policy-oriented insurance and compulsory insurance	Regulate self-insurance and mutual insurance, insurance trade associations
7.	Supervise fair competition in industry	To investigate and punish unfair competition and illegal conduct, non compliance of registration
8.	Supervise insurance companies with overseas operations	Regulate overseas operations of domestic insurance firms
9.	Create framework for insurance industry for information, risk, forecast, supervision.	Create standards for risk, forecast, profitability and report to the People's Bank of China.
10.	To undertake other jobs delegated by the State Council	Subordinate to State Council directives

== Structure ==
Internal Setup of the CIRC is:

- General Office
- Development and Reform Department
- Finance and Accounting Department
- Property Insurance Regulatory Department
- Personal Insurance Regulatory Department
- Insurance Intermediaries Regulatory Department
- Insurance Fund Management Regulatory Department
- International Department
- Legal Affairs Department
- Statistics and IT Department
- Local Offices Administration Department
- Personnel and Education Department
- Disciplinary Inspection Department

== Funds ==
In September 2008, CIRC set up a nonprofit state-owned corporation China Insurance Security Fund Co., Ltd. (Chinese: 中国保险保障基金有限责任公司) with a registered capital of 100 million yuan to manage its insurance protection fund, amounting to at least 7 billion yuan (about US$1 billion).

== Management ==
The chief of the agency, Xiang Junbo, was appointed in October 2011 and has laid plans to introduce pricing and other market reforms.

In April 2017, the Central Commission for Discipline Inspection (CCDI) of the Chinese Communist Party (CCP) announced online that Xiang was being investigated for suspected serious violation of the Party's code of conduct. In early September, Xiang was expelled from the CCP and dismissed from public office, the CCDI said.

== List of presidents ==
Name (English)	Name (Chinese)	Tenure begins	Tenure ends	Note
Ma Yongwei	马永伟	November 1998	October 2002	
Wu Dingfu	吴定富	October 2002	October 2011	
Xiang Junbo	项俊波	October 2011	April 2017	

== See also ==
- China Securities Journal
