= China Securities Regulatory Commission =

Chinese government agency

China Securities Regulatory Commission (CSRC)
- 中国证券监督管理委员会
- Logo as of 30 June 2025

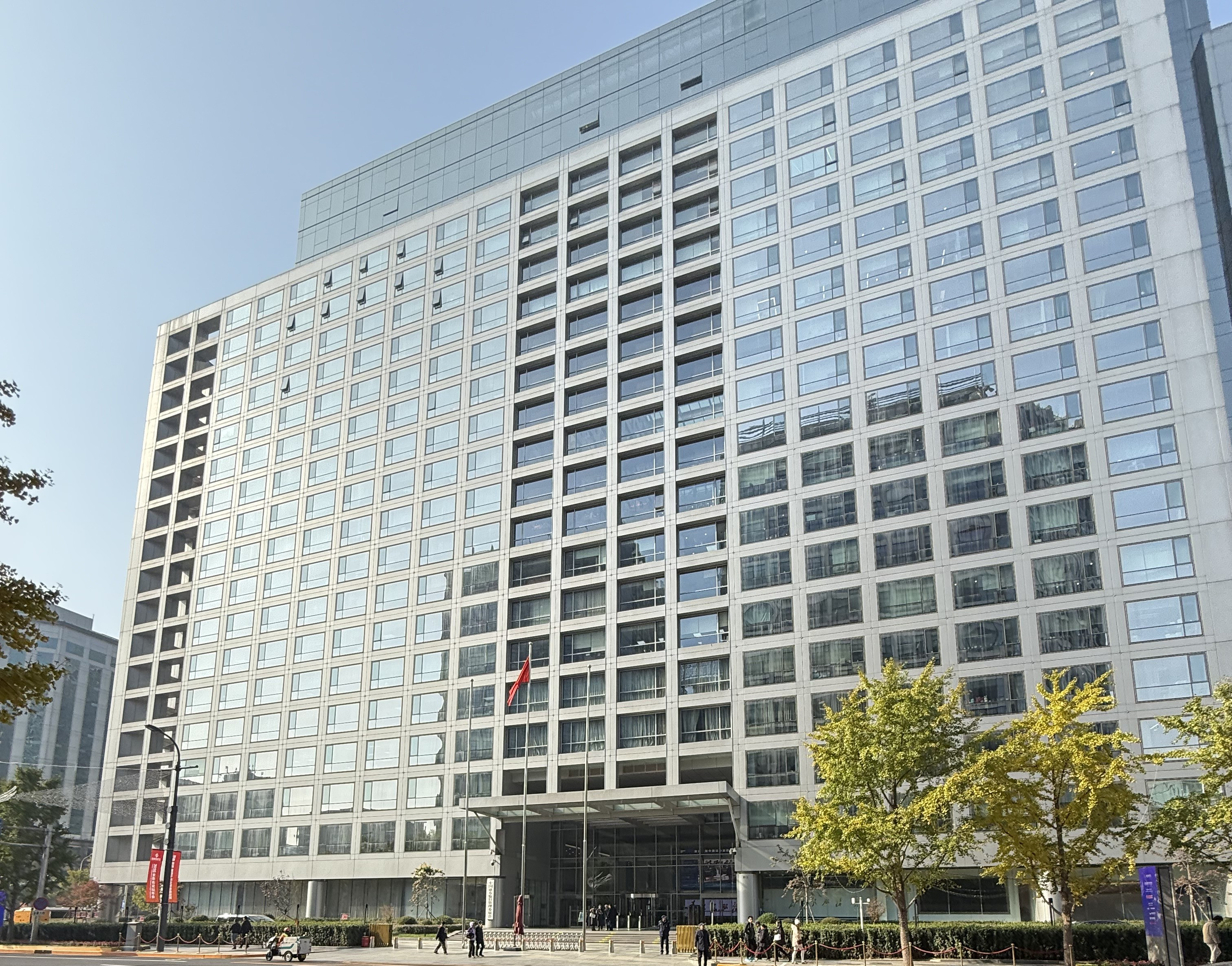
- CSRC building on Beijing Financial Street

Agency overview
- Formed: 1992
- Jurisdiction: People's Republic of China
- Headquarters: Beijing
- Agency executive: Wu Qing, Chairman
- Parent agency: State Council
- Website: www.csrc.gov.cn

China Securities Regulatory Commission
- Simplified Chinese: 中国证券监督管理委员会
- Traditional Chinese: 中國証券監督管理委員會
Transcriptions
Standard Mandarin
- Hanyu Pinyin: Zhōngguó Zhèngquàn Jiāndū Guǎnlǐ Wěiyuánhuì

Alternative Chinese name
- Simplified Chinese: 中国证监会
- Traditional Chinese: 中國証監會
Transcriptions
Standard Mandarin
- Hanyu Pinyin: Zhōngguó Zhèng Jiān Huì

The China Securities Regulatory Commission (CSRC) is a government agency directly under the State Council of China. It is the main regulator of the securities industry in China.

== History ==
Indicative of the specialized role of the CSRC, China's highest court (the Supreme People's Court) has declined to handle securities-related litigation directly (at least through 2004), instead deferring such judgments to the CSRC.

In November 2022, it stated its role to build "a capital market with Chinese characteristics".

In 2023, the CSRC was upgraded to a government agency directly under the State Council as part of the plan on reforming Party and state institutions. Additionally, it was granted responsibility auditing corporate bond issuances from the National Development and Reform Commission.

In late 2023 and early 2024, in order to stabilize share prices, the CSRC instructed some institutional investors not to sell stocks.

== Functions ==
China's first Securities Law was passed December 1998, and became effective July 1, 1999. The nation's first comprehensive securities legislation, it grants CSRC "authority to implement a centralized and unified regulation of the nationwide securities market in order to ensure their lawful operation". The CSRC oversees China's nationwide centralized securities supervisory system, with the power to regulate and supervise securities issuers, as well as to investigate, and impose penalties for "illegal activities related to securities and futures". The CSRC is empowered to issue opinions or "Guideline Opinions", which are not legally binding, as guidelines for publicly traded corporations.

== Affiliated bodies ==
A number of Chinese financial sector bodies, including all mainland national stock exchanges and futures exchanges and several self-regulatory organizations, are placed under the direct authority of the CSRC:

- Shanghai Stock Exchange (SHSE)
- Shenzhen Stock Exchange (SZSE), including ChiNext
- National Equities Exchange and Quotations (NEEQ), including the Beijing Stock Exchange (BSE)
- Dalian Commodity Exchange (DCE)
- Shanghai Futures Exchange (SHFE)
- Zhengzhou Commodity Exchange (ZCE)
- China Financial Futures Exchange (CFFEX)
- Securities Association of China (SAC)
- China Futures Association (CFA)
- Asset Management Association of China (ACAM)
- China Securities Depository and Clearing Corporation (CSDC)
- China Securities Investor Protection Fund (SIPF)
- China Securities Finance (CSF)
- China Futures Market Monitoring Center (CFMMC)
- China Market Statistics & Monitoring Center (CMSMC)
- China Institute of Finance and Capital Markets (CIFCM)
- China Securities Information Technology Service (CSITS)
- China Minority Investors Service Center (CSISC)

For example, the CSRC appoints the chairperson and CEO of the exchanges.

== List of chairpersons ==
No.	Name	Took office	Left office
1	Liu Hongru	26 October 1992	30 March 1995
2	Zhou Daojiong	31 March 1995	3 July 1997
3	Zhou Zhengqing	12 July 1997	23 February 2000
4	Zhou Xiaochuan	24 February 2000	27 December 2002
5	Shang Fulin	27 December 2002	29 October 2011
6	Guo Shuqing	29 October 2011	17 March 2013
7	Xiao Gang	17 March 2013	20 February 2016
8	Liu Shiyu	20 February 2016	26 January 2019
9	Yi Huiman	26 January 2019	7 February 2024
10	Wu Qing	7 February 2024	Incumbent

== See also ==
- National Financial Regulatory Administration
- China Securities Journal
- List of financial supervisory authorities by country
