= Xiao Gang =

Chinese banker (born 1958)

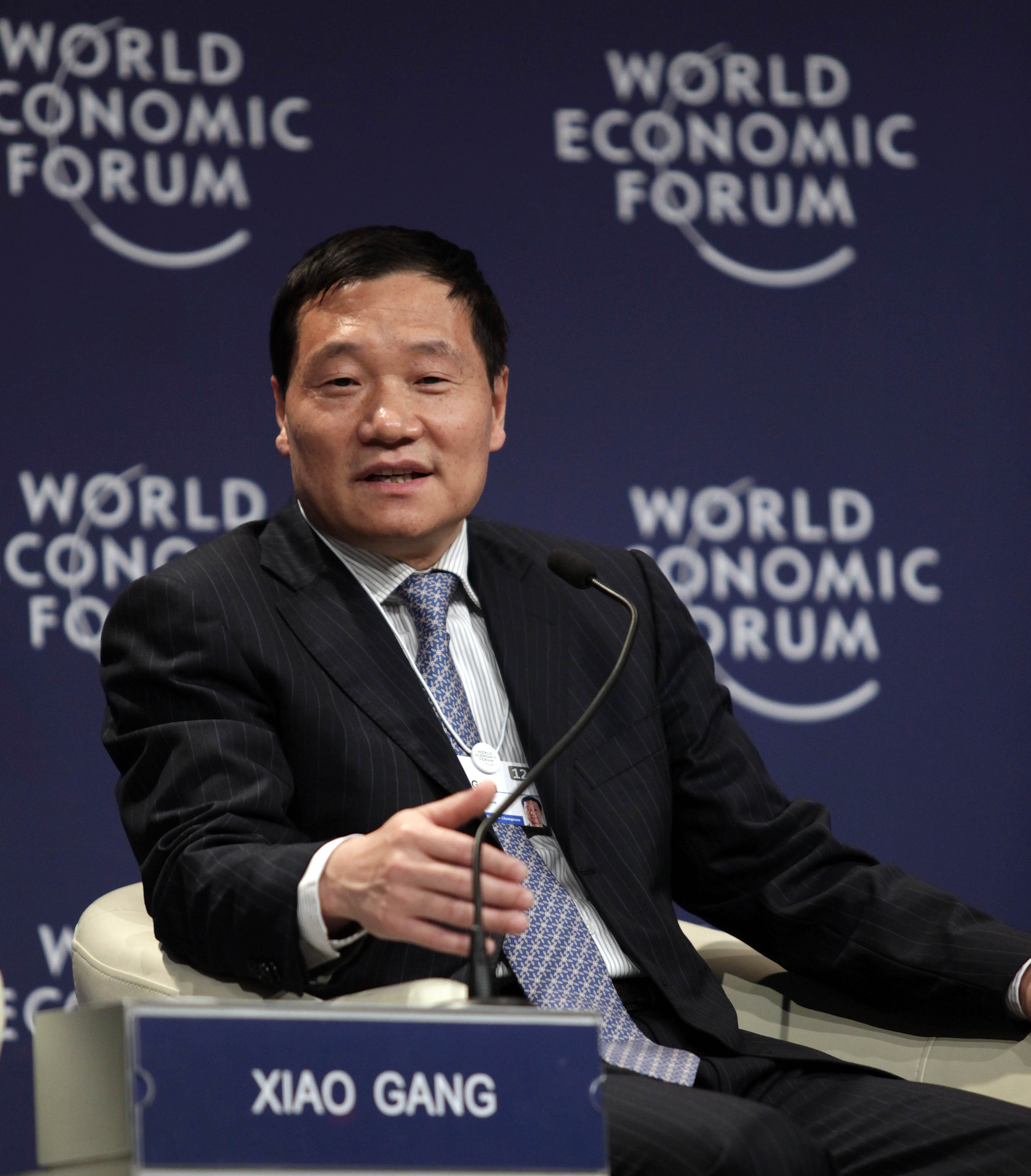
- Xiao Gang at the World Economic Forum Annual Meeting of the New Champions in 2012
- Born: 1958 (age 67–68); Ji'an, Jiangxi
- Known for: Chairman of the China Securities Regulatory Commission (2013–2016); Chairman of the board of Bank of China Limited (2003–2013)

Xiao Gang (Chinese: 肖钢; pinyin: Xiāo Gāng; born 1958 in Ji'an, Jiangxi) was the chairman of the China Securities Regulatory Commission from March 2013 until 20 February 2016. He was previously chairman of the board of directors of Bank of China Limited, of the Bank of China (Hong Kong) Limited, and deputy governor of the People's Bank of China, the central bank of the People's Republic of China. He has been credited for playing a crucial role in the reform of China's banking sector.

== Biography ==
Xiao Gang graduated from Hunan Institute of Finance and Economics in 1981. He holds a master's degree in International Economic Law from the Renmin University of China (1996).

Xiao Gang joined the People's Bank of China in 1981 where he served as director of research, head of the foreign exchange trade center, and assistant governor in October 1996. From October 1998 to March 2003, he was deputy governor of the PBOC, and member of the Currency Policy Committee from 2000 to March 2003.

Xiao Gang was appointed the chairman of the board in Bank of China Limited in March 2003.

Xiao Gang was appointed chairman of the China Securities Regulatory Commission in March 2013. He was the scapegoat for critics after the July–August 2015 stock market mayhem (28% drop in value). He is blamed for allowing a speculative bubble to grow which led millions of Chinese families to lose their invested savings. In an article of Foreign policy, David Wertime argues that the Chinese government, through its state-controlled media outlets, clearly favored Xiao Gang's fast-growth policy.

On 20 February 2016, Xiao stepped down as chairman of the China Securities Regulatory Commission. He is a Non-Resident Senior Fellow at the China Finance 40 Forum (CF40).

== Family ==
Xiao Gang is married to Wu Touhong (b. 1959). Wu Touhong graduated from Hunan Institute of Finance and Economics, and served at China Minsheng Banking Corp., Ltd.(CMBC) as chief financial officer. Together they have two sons, Xiao Haojie (Michael) and Xiao Nan (Leo). Xiao Haojie (Michael) served as the board member at GF Securities. Xiao Nan (Leo) studied MBA at UCLA Anderson School of Management.

Xiao Gang has famously let his hair go grey, while most Chinese high-ranking officials dye their hair black.
