= 12th Politburo of the Chinese Communist Party =

12th electoral term of the Political Bureau of the Chinese Communist Party

The 12th Politburo of the Chinese Communist Party (CCP), formally the Political Bureau of the 12th Central Committee of the Communist Party of China, was elected at the 1st plenary session of the 12th Central Committee of the CCP on 13 September 1982 in the aftermath of the 12th National Congress. This electoral term was preceded by the 11th Politburo and succeeded by the 13th. Six of the 31 members served concurrently in the 12th Politburo Standing Committee.

== Composition ==
=== Members ===
Members of the Political Bureau of the 12th Central Committee of the Chinese Communist Party
Officeholder		11th	13th	Birth	PM	Death	Birthplace	Ethnicity	Gender	Offices held	Ref.
Chen Yun	陈云	Old	Not	1905	1925	1995	Shanghai	Han	Male	One: Party office; First Secretary, Standing Committee of the Central Commission for Discipline Inspection	
Deng Xiaoping	邓小平	Old	Not	1904	1924	1997	Sichuan	Han	Male	Four: Party office; Chairman, Central Advisory Commission; Organisational office; Chairman, National Committee of the Chinese People's Political Consultative Conference (until 1983); Military offices; Chairman, Central Military Commission of the Central Committee; Chairman, Central Military Commission of the People's Republic of China (from 1983)	
Deng Yingchao	邓颖超	Old	5th PLE	1904	1924	1992	Guangxi	Han	Female	One: Organisational office; Chairwoman, National Committee of the Chinese People's Political Consultative Conference	
Fang Yi	方毅	Old	Not	1916	1931	1997	Fujian	Han	Male	One: Party office; Director, State Science and Technology Commission	
Hu Qiaomu	胡乔木	New	Not	1912	1932	1992	Jiangsu	Han	Male	One: State office; President, Chinese Academy of Social Sciences	
Hu Qili	胡启立	5th PLE	Elected	1929	1948	Alive	Shaanxi	Han	Male	Two: Party office; First-ranked Secretary, Secretariat of the Central Committee; Head, General Office of the Central Committee	
Hu Yaobang	胡耀邦	Old	Elected	1915	1933	1989	Hunan	Han	Male	One: Party office; General Secretary, Central Committee	
Li Desheng	李德生	Old	5th PLE	1916	1932	2011	Henan	Han	Male	One: State office; First Political Commissar, People's Liberation Army National Defence University	
Li Peng	李鹏	5th PLE	Elected	1928	1945	2019	Shanghai	Han	Male	Two: State offices; Vice Premier of the People's Republic of China; Director, State Education Commission	
Li Xiannian	李先念	Old	Not	1909	1927	1992	Hubei	Han	Male	One: State office; President, People's Republic of China (from 1983)	
Liao Chengzhi	廖承志	New	Died	1908	1923	1983	Tokyo	Han	Male	One: Party office; Director, Overseas Chinese Affairs Office	
Ni Zhifu	倪志福	Old	Not	1933	1958	2013	Shanghai	Han	Male	One: Organisational office; Chairman, Central Committee of the All-China Federation of Trade Unions	
Nie Rongzhen	聂荣臻	Old	5th PLE	1899	1923	1992	Sichuan	Han	Male	None: Held no other political offices than membership in the Central Committee and the Politburo.	
Peng Zhen	彭真	Old	Not	1902	1923	1997	Shanxi	Han	Male	One: State office; Chairman of the Standing Committee of the National People's Congress	
Qiao Shi	乔石	5th PLE	Elected	1924	1940	2015	Shanghai	Han	Male	Two: Party offices; Secretary, Central Political and Legal Affairs Commission of the Central Committee; Head, General Office of the Central Committee	
Song Renqiong	宋任穷	New	5th PLE	1909	1926	2005	Hunan	Han	Male	One: Party office; Head, Organisation Department of the Central Committee	
Tian Jiyun	田纪云	5th PLE	Elected	1929	1945	Alive	Shandong	Han	Male	One: State office; Vice Premier of the People's Republic of China	
Ulanhu	乌兰夫	Old	5th PLE	1907	1925	1988	Suiyuan	Tümed	Male	One: State office; Vice President of the People's Republic of China	
Wan Li	万里	New	Elected	1916	1933	2015	Shandong	Han	Male	One: State office; First-ranked Vice Premier of the People's Republic of China	
Wang Zhen	王震	Old	5th PLE	1908	1928	1993	Hunan	Han	Male	One: Party office; President, Party School of the Central Committee	
Wei Guoqing	韦国清	Old	5th PLE	1913	1931	1989	Guangxi	Zhuang	Male	One: State office; Vice Chairman, Standing Committee of the National People's Congress	
Wu Xueqian	吴学谦	5th PLE	Elected	1921	1939	2008	Shanghai	Han	Male	Two: State office; Vice Premier of the People's Republic of China; Minister of Foreign Affairs of the People's Republic of China	
Xi Zhongxun	习仲勋	New	Not	1913	1928	2002	Shaanxi	Han	Male	One: State office; Vice Chairman, Standing Committee of the National People's Congress	
Xu Xiangqian	徐向前	Old	5th PLE	1901	1927	1990	Shanxi	Han	Male	None: Held no other political offices than membership in the Central Committee and the Politburo.	
Yang Dezhi	杨得志	New	Not	1911	1931	1994	Hunan	Han	Male	One: Military office; Head, General Staff Department of the Central Military Commission	
Yang Shangkun	杨尚昆	New	Elected	1907	1926	1998	Chongqing	Han	Male	Two: Military offices; Vice Chairman, Central Military Commission; Secretary-General, Central Military Commission	
Yao Yilin	姚依林	5th PLE	Elected	1917	1935	1994	Hong Kong	Han	Male	One: State office; Head, State Planning Commission	
Ye Jianying	叶剑英	Old	4th PLE	1897	1927	1986	Guangdong	Han	Male	Three: State office; Chairman, Standing Committee of the National People's Congress; Military offices; Vice Chairman, Central Military Commission of the Central Committee; Vice Chairman, Central Military Commission of the People's Republic of China	
Yu Qiuli	余秋里	Old	Not	1914	1931	1999	Jiangxi	Han	Male	One: Military office; Head, General Political Department of the Central Military Commission	
Zhang Tingfa	张廷发	Old	5th PLE	1918	1936	2010	Fujian	Han	Male	One: Military office; Commander, People's Liberation Army Air Force	
Zhao Ziyang	赵紫阳	Old	Elected	1919	1938	2005	Henan	Han	Male	Three: Party office; Leader, Central Leading Group for Financial and Economic Work of the Central Committee; State office; Premier, State Council of the People's Republic of China; Organisational office; Vice Chairman, National Committee of the Chinese People's Political Consultative Conference (before 1983)	

=== Alternates ===
Alternates of the Political Bureau of the 12th Central Committee of the Chinese Communist Party
Officeholder		11th	13th	Birth	PM	Death	Birthplace	Ethnicity	Gender	Offices held	Ref.
Chen Muhua	陈慕华	Alternate	Not	1921	1938	2011	Guangxi	Han	Female	Two: State offices; State Councilor of the People's Republic of China; Governor, People's Bank of China	
Qin Jiwei	秦基偉	New	Member	1914	1930	1997	Hubei	Han	Male	One: State office; Vice Minister of National Defense	
Yao Yilin	姚依林	New	5th PLE	1917	1935	1994	Hong Kong	Han	Male	One: State office; Head, State Planning Commission	
