= 13th Politburo Standing Committee of the Chinese Communist Party =

The 13th Politburo Standing Committee of the Chinese Communist Party, formally the Standing Committee of the Political Bureau of the 13th Central Committee of the Communist Party of China, was elected by the 1st plenary session of the 13th Central Committee in 1987, in the aftermath of the 13th National Congress of the Chinese Communist Party (CCP). It was preceded by the CCP's 12th Politburo Standing Committee and was succeeded by the 14th in 1992.

== Composition ==
=== 1st plenary session (1987–1989) ===
Members of the Standing Committee of the Political Bureau of the 1st plenary session of the 13th Central Committee of the Chinese Communist Party
Rank	Officeholder		12th	4th P	Birth	PM	Death	Birthplace	Positions	Ref.
1	Zhao Ziyang	赵紫阳	Old	Not	1919	1938	2005	Henan	Four: Party offices; General Secretary, Central Committee; Leader, Central Leading Group for Financial and Economic Work of the Central Committee; Military offices; Vice Chairman, Central Military Commission of the Central Committee; Vice Chairman, Central Military Commission of the People's Republic of China	
2	Li Peng	李鹏	New	Renewed	1928	1945	2019	Shanghai	Two: State offices; Premier, State Council of the People's Republic of China; Chairman, State Education Commission (before 1988)	
3	Qiao Shi	乔石	New	Renewed	1924	1940	2015	Shanghai	Two: Party offices; Secretary, Standing Committee of the Central Commission for Discipline Inspection; Secretary, Central Political and Legal Affairs Commission of the Central Committee	
4	Hu Qili	胡启立	New	Not	1929	1948	Alive	Shaanxi	One: Party office; First-ranked Secretary, Secretariat of the Central Committee	
5	Yao Yilin	姚依林	New	Renewed	1917	1935	1994	Hong Kong	Three: State offices; Vice Premier, State Council of the People's Republic of China (before 1988); First-ranked Vice Premier, State Council of the People's Republic of China (from 1988); Minister in charge, State Development Commission	

=== 4th plenary session (1989–1992) ===
Members of the Standing Committee of the Political Bureau of the 4th plenary session of the 13th Central Committee of the Chinese Communist Party
Rank	Officeholder		1st P	14th	Birth	PM	Death	Birthplace	Positions	Ref.
1	Jiang Zemin	江泽民	New	Elected	1926	1946	2022	Jiangsu	Five: Party offices; General Secretary, Central Committee; Leader, Central Leading Group for Financial and Economic Work of the Central Committee; Leader, Central Leading Group for Taiwan Affairs of the Central Committee; Military offices; Chairman, Central Military Commission of the Central Committee; Chairman, Central Military Commission of the People's Republic of China (from 1990)	
2	Li Peng	李鹏	Old	Elected	1928	1945	2019	Shanghai	One: State office; Premier, State Council of the People's Republic of China	
3	Qiao Shi	乔石	Old	Elected	1924	1940	2015	Shanghai	Two: Party offices; Secretary, Standing Committee of the Central Commission for Discipline Inspection; Secretary, Central Political and Legal Affairs Commission of the Central Committee	
4	Yao Yilin	姚依林	Old	Not	1917	1935	1994	Hong Kong	One: State office; First-ranked Vice Premier, State Council of the People's Republic of China	
5	Song Ping	宋平	New	Not	1917	1937	2026	Shandong	One: Party office; Head, Organisation Department of the Central Committee	
6	Li Ruihuan	李瑞环	New	Elected	1934	1959	Alive	Tianjin	One: Party office; Leader, Central Leading Group for Propaganda, Ideology and Culture of the Central Committee	
