= 11th Politburo of the Chinese Communist Party =

11th electoral term of the Political Bureau of the Chinese Communist Party

The 11th Politburo of the Chinese Communist Party (CCP), formally the Political Bureau of the 11th Central Committee of the Communist Party of China, was elected at the 1st plenary session of the 11th Central Committee of the CCP on 19 August 1977 in the aftermath of the 11th National Congress. This electoral term was preceded by the 10th Politburo and succeeded by the 12th. Eighth of the 29 members served concurrently in the 11th Politburo Standing Committee.

== Composition ==
=== Members ===
Members of the Political Bureau of the 11th Central Committee of the Chinese Communist Party
Officeholder		10th	12th	Birth	PM	Death	Birthplace	Ethnicity	Gender	Offices held	Ref.
Chen Xilian	陈锡联	Old	5th PLE	1915	1948	1999	Hubei	Han	Male	One: Military office; Commander, Beijing Military Region of the People's Liberation Army	
Chen Yonggui	陈永贵	Old	Not	1914	1948	1986	Shanxi	Han	Male	One: State office; Vice Premier of the People's Republic of China	
Chen Yun	陈云	3rd PLE	Elected	1905	1925	1995	Shanghai	Han	Male	One: Party office; First Secretary, Standing Committee of the Central Commission for Discipline Inspection	
Deng Xiaoping	邓小平	Old	Elected	1904	1924	1997	Sichuan	Han	Male	Five: Party office; Vice Chairman, Central Committee; State office; First-ranked Vice Premier, State Council of the People's Republic of China; Organisational office; Chairman, National Committee of the Chinese People's Political Consultative Conference (from 1978); Military office; Chairman, Central Military Commission of the Central Committee; Chief, General Staff Department of the Central Military Commission	
Deng Yingchao	邓颖超	3rd PLE	Elected	1904	1924	1992	Guangxi	Han	Female	One: Party office; Second Secretary, Standing Committee of the Central Commission for Discipline Inspection	
Fang Yi	方毅	New	Elected	1916	1931	1997	Fujian	Han	Male	Three: State offices; Vice Premier of the People's Republic of China; Director, State Science and Technology Commission; President, Chinese Academy of Sciences	
Geng Biao	耿飚	New	Not	1909	1928	2000	Hunan	Han	Male	Two: State offices; Vice Premier of the People's Republic of China; Minister of National Defence	
Hu Yaobang	胡耀邦	3rd PLE	Elected	1915	1933	1989	Hunan	Han	Male	Three: Party offices; Chairman, Central Committee; General Secretary, Central Committee; Secretary-General, Central Committee Secretariat	
Hua Guofeng	华国锋	Old	Not	1921	1938	2008	Shanxi	Han	Male	Four: Party offices; Chairman, Central Committee; Vice Chairman, Central Committee; State office; Premier, State Council of the People's Republic of China; Military office; Chairman, Central Military Commission of the Central Committee	
Ji Dengkui	纪登奎	Old	5th PLE	1923	1938	1988	Shanxi	Han	Male	One: Party office; Vice Premier of the People's Republic of China	
Li Desheng	李德生	Old	Elected	1916	1932	2011	Henan	Han	Male	One: Military office; Commander, Shenyang Military Region of the People's Liberation Army	
Li Xiannian	李先念	Old	Elected	1909	1927	1992	Hubei	Han	Male	One: State office; President, People's Republic of China (from 1983)	
Liu Bocheng	刘伯承	Old	Not	1892	1926	1986	Sichuan	Han	Male	One: State office; Vice Chairman, Standing Committee of the National People's Congress	
Ni Zhifu	倪志福	Alternate	Elected	1933	1958	2013	Shanghai	Han	Male	One: Organisational office; Chairman, Central Committee of the All-China Federation of Trade Unions	
Nie Rongzhen	聂荣臻	New	Elected	1899	1923	1992	Sichuan	Han	Male	One: State office; Vice Chairman, Standing Committee of the National People's Congress	
Peng Chong	彭冲	New	Not	1915	1934	2010	Fujian	Han	Male	Four: Party office; Secretary, Shanghai Municipal Party Committee; Organisational office; Chairman, Shanghai Municipal Committee of the Chinese People's Political Consultative Conference; State offices; Secretary, Shanghai Revolutionary Committee; Mayor of Shanghai Municipal People's Government	
Peng Zhen	彭真	4th PLE	Elected	1902	1923	1997	Shanxi	Han	Male	Two: Party office; Secretary, Central Political and Legal Affairs Commission of the Central Committee; State office; Secretary-General, Standing Committee of the National People's Congress	
Su Zhenhua	苏振华	Alternate	Died	1912	1930	1979	Hunan	Han	Male	Two: State offices; Secretary, Shanghai Revolutionary Committee; Mayor of Shanghai Municipal People's Government	
Ulanhu	乌兰夫	New	Elected	1907	1925	1988	Suiyuan	Tümed	Male	One: Party office; Head, United Front Work Department of the Central Committee	
Wang Dongxing	汪东兴	New	Not	1916	1932	2015	Jiangxi	Han	Male	Two: Party offices; Vice Chairman, Central Committee; Director, General Office of the Central Committee	
Wang Zhen	王震	3rd PLE	Elected	1908	1928	1993	Hunan	Han	Male	One: State office; Vice Premier of the People's Republic of China	
Wei Guoqing	韦国清	Old	Elected	1913	1931	1989	Guangxi	Zhuang	Male	Three: Party office; Secretary, Guangdong Provincial Party Committee; Military office; Head, General Political Department of the Central Military Commission; State office; Vice Chairman, Standing Committee of the National People's Congress	
Wu De	吴德	Old	5th PLE	1913	1933	1995	Hebei	Han	Male	One: Party office; Secretary, Beijing Municipal Party Committee	
Xu Shiyou	许世友	Old	Not	1906	1927	1985	Henan	Han	Male	One: Military office; Commander, Guangzhou Military Region of the People's Liberation Army	
Xu Xiangqian	徐向前	New	Elected	1901	1927	1990	Shanxi	Han	Male	Two: State offices; Vice Premier of the People's Republic of China; Minister of National Defence	
Ye Jianying	叶剑英	Old	Elected	1897	1927	1986	Guangdong	Han	Male	Three: State office; Chairman, Standing Committee of the National People's Congress; Military offices; Vice Chairman, Central Military Commission of the Central Committee; Vice Chairman, Central Military Commission of the People's Republic of China	
Yu Qiuli	余秋里	New	Elected	1914	1931	1999	Jiangxi	Han	Male	Two: State offices; Vice Premier of the People's Republic of China; Minister, State Planning Commission	
Zhang Tingfa	张廷发	New	Elected	1918	1936	2010	Fujian	Han	Male	One: Military office; Commander, People's Liberation Army Air Force	
Zhao Ziyang	赵紫阳	4th PLE	Elected	1919	1938	2005	Henan	Han	Male	Five: Party office; Vice Chairman, Central Committee; Head, Leading Group for Financial and Economic Affairs of the Central Committee; Secretary, Sichuan Provincial Party Committee; Organisational office; Vice Chairman, National Committee of the Chinese People's Political Consultative Conference; State office; Governor of Sichuan	

=== Alternates ===
Alternates of the Political Bureau of the 11th Central Committee of the Chinese Communist Party
Officeholder		10th	12th	Birth	PM	Death	Birthplace	Ethnicity	Gender	Offices held	Ref.
Chen Muhua	陈慕华	New	Alternate	1921	1938	2011	Guangxi	Han	Female	Two: State offices; Vice Premier of the People's Republic of China; Minister of Foreign Economic Liaison	
Saifuddin Azizi	赛福鼎·艾则孜	Alternate	Not	1915	1949	2003	Xinjiang	Uyghur	Male	Two: Party office; Secretary, Xinjiang Uyghur Autonomous Region Party Committee; State office; Vice Chairman, Standing Committee of the National People's Congress	
Zhao Ziyang	赵紫阳	New	4th PLE	1919	1938	2005	Henan	Han	Male	Three: Party office; Secretary, Sichuan Provincial Party Committee; Organisational office; Vice Chairman, National Committee of the Chinese People's Political Consultative Conference; State office; Governor of Sichuan	
