= 11th Politburo Standing Committee of the Chinese Communist Party =

The 11th Politburo Standing Committee of the Chinese Communist Party, formally the Standing Committee of the Political Bureau of the 11th Central Committee of the Communist Party of China, was elected by the 1st plenary session of the 11th Central Committee in 1977, in the aftermath of the 11th National Congress of the Chinese Communist Party (CCP). It was preceded by the CCP's 10th Politburo Standing Committee and was succeeded by the 12th in 1982.

== Composition ==
=== 1st plenary session (1977–1978) ===
Members of the Standing Committee of the Political Bureau of the 1st plenary session of the 11th Central Committee of the Chinese Communist Party
Rank	Officeholder	Hanzi	10th PSC	4th PLE	Birth	PM	Death	Birthplace	No. of offices	Ref.
1	Hua Guofeng	华国锋	Old	Renewed	1921	1938	2008	Shanxi	Three: Party office; Chairman, Central Committee; State office; Premier, State Council of the People's Republic of China; Military office; Chairman, Central Military Commission of the Central Committee	
2	Ye Jianying	叶剑英	Old	Renewed	1897	1927	1986	Guangdong	Four: Party office; First Vice Chairman, Central Committee; State offices; Minister of National Defense, People's Republic of China (before 1978); Chairman, Standing Committee of the National People's Congress (from 1978); Military office; Vice Chairman, Central Military Commission of the Central Committee	
3	Deng Xiaoping	邓小平	Old	Renewed	1904	1924	1997	Sichuan	Four: Party office; Vice Chairman, Central Committee; State office; First-ranked Vice Premier, State Council of the People's Republic of China; Organisational office; Chairman, National Committee of the Chinese People's Political Consultative Conference (from 1978); Military office; Chief, General Staff Department of the Central Military Commission	
4	Li Xiannian	李先念	Old	Renewed	1909	1927	1992	Hubei	Two: Party office; Vice Chairman, Central Committee; State office; Vice Premier, State Council of the People's Republic of China	
5	Wang Dongxing	汪东兴	Old	Renewed	1916	1932	2015	Jiangxi	Two: Party offices; Vice Chairman, Central Committee; Director, General Office of the Central Committee	

=== 3rd plenary session (1978–1980) ===
Members of the Standing Committee of the Political Bureau of the 3rd plenary session of the 11th Central Committee of the Chinese Communist Party
Rank	Officeholder	Hanzi	1st PLE	5th PLE	Birth	PM	Death	Birthplace	No. of offices	Ref.
1	Hua Guofeng	华国锋	Old	Renewed	1921	1938	2008	Shanxi	Three: Party office; Chairman, Central Committee; State office; Premier, State Council of the People's Republic of China; Military office; Chairman, Central Military Commission of the Central Committee	
2	Ye Jianying	叶剑英	Old	Renewed	1897	1927	1986	Guangdong	Three: Party office; First Vice Chairman, Central Committee; State office; Chairman, Standing Committee of the National People's Congress; Military office; Vice Chairman, Central Military Commission of the Central Committee	
3	Deng Xiaoping	邓小平	Old	Renewed	1904	1924	1997	Sichuan	Four: Party office; Vice Chairman, Central Committee; State office; First-ranked Vice Premier, State Council of the People's Republic of China; Organisational office; Chairman, National Committee of the Chinese People's Political Consultative Conference; Military office; Chief, General Staff Department of the Central Military Commission	
4	Li Xiannian	李先念	Old	Renewed	1909	1927	1992	Hubei	Two: Party office; Vice Chairman, Central Committee; State office; Vice Premier, State Council of the People's Republic of China	
5	Wang Dongxing	汪东兴	Old	Not	1916	1932	2015	Jiangxi	Two: Party offices; Vice Chairman, Central Committee; Head, General Office of the Central Committee	
6	Chen Yun	陈云	Comeback	Renewed	1905	1925	1995	Shanghai	Three: Party offices; Vice Chairman, Central Committee; First Secretary, Standing Committee of the Central Commission for Discipline Inspection; State office; Vice Chairman, Standing Committee of the National People's Congress	

=== 5th plenary session (1980–1981) ===
Members of the Standing Committee of the Political Bureau of the 5th plenary session of the 11th Central Committee of the Chinese Communist Party
Rank	Officeholder	Hanzi	3rd PLE	6th PLE	Birth	PM	Death	Birthplace	No. of offices	Ref.
1	Hua Guofeng	华国锋	Old	Renewed	1921	1938	2008	Shanxi	Three: Party office; Chairman, Central Committee; State office; Premier, State Council of the People's Republic of China (until September 1980); Military office; Chairman, Central Military Commission of the Central Committee	
2	Ye Jianying	叶剑英	Old	Renewed	1897	1927	1986	Guangdong	Three: Party office; First Vice Chairman, Central Committee; State office; Chairman, Standing Committee of the National People's Congress; Military office; Vice Chairman, Central Military Commission of the Central Committee	
3	Deng Xiaoping	邓小平	Old	Renewed	1904	1924	1997	Sichuan	Three: Party office; Vice Chairman, Central Committee; State office; First-ranked Vice Premier, State Council of the People's Republic of China (until September 1980); Organisational office; Chairman, National Committee of the Chinese People's Political Consultative Conference	
4	Li Xiannian	李先念	Old	Renewed	1909	1927	1992	Hubei	Two: Party office; Vice Chairman, Central Committee; State office; Vice Premier, State Council of the People's Republic of China	
5	Chen Yun	陈云	Old	Renewed	1905	1925	1995	Shanghai	Three: Party offices; Vice Chairman, Central Committee; First Secretary, Standing Committee of the Central Commission for Discipline Inspection; State office; Vice Chairman, Standing Committee of the National People's Congress	
6	Hu Yaobang	胡耀邦	New	Renewed	1915	1933	1989	Hunan	One: Party office; Secretary-General, Central Committee Secretariat	
7	Zhao Ziyang	赵紫阳	New	Renewed	1919	1938	2005	Henan	Five: Party offices; Secretary, Sichuan Provincial Committee (February–March 1980); Leader, Central Leading Group for Financial and Economic Work of the Central Committee (from March 1980); State offices; Governor, Sichuan Province (February–September 1980); Premier, State Council of the People's Republic of China (from September 1980); Organisational office; Vice Chairman, National Committee of the Chinese People's Political Consultative Conference	

=== 6th plenary session (1981–1982) ===
Members of the Standing Committee of the Political Bureau of the 6th plenary session of the 11th Central Committee of the Chinese Communist Party
Rank	Officeholder	Hanzi	5th PLE	12th PSC	Birth	PM	Death	Birthplace	No. of offices	Ref.
1	Hu Yaobang	胡耀邦	Old	Reelected	1915	1933	1989	Hunan	Two: Party offices; Chairman, Central Committee; Secretary-General, Central Committee Secretariat	
2	Ye Jianying	叶剑英	Old	Reelected	1897	1927	1986	Guangdong	Three: Party office; First Vice Chairman, Central Committee; State office; Chairman, Standing Committee of the National People's Congress; Military office; Vice Chairman, Central Military Commission of the Central Committee	
3 (de facto 1)	Deng Xiaoping	邓小平	Old	Reelected	1904	1924	1997	Sichuan	Three: Party office; Vice Chairman, Central Committee; Organisational office; Chairman, National Committee of the Chinese People's Political Consultative Conference; Military office; Chairman, Central Military Commission of the Central Committee	
4	Zhao Ziyang	赵紫阳	Old	Reelected	1919	1938	2005	Henan	Four: Party offices; Vice Chairman, Central Committee; Leader, Central Leading Group for Financial and Economic Work of the Central Committee; State office; Premier, State Council of the People's Republic of China; Organisational office; Vice Chairman, National Committee of the Chinese People's Political Consultative Conference	
5	Li Xiannian	李先念	Old	Reelected	1909	1927	1992	Hubei	One: Party office; Vice Chairman, Central Committee	
6	Chen Yun	陈云	Old	Reelected	1905	1925	1995	Shanghai	Two: Party offices; Vice Chairman, Central Committee; First Secretary, Standing Committee of the Central Commission for Discipline Inspection	
7	Hua Guofeng	华国锋	Old	Not	1921	1938	2008	Shanxi	One: Party office; Vice Chairman, Central Committee	
