= 12th Politburo Standing Committee of the Chinese Communist Party =

The 12th Politburo Standing Committee of the Chinese Communist Party, formally the Standing Committee of the Political Bureau of the 12th Central Committee of the Communist Party of China, was elected by the 1st plenary session of the 12th Central Committee in 1982, in the aftermath of the 12th National Congress of the Chinese Communist Party (CCP). It was preceded by the CCP's 11th Politburo Standing Committee and was succeeded by the 13th in 1987.

== Composition ==
=== 1st plenary session (1982–1985) ===
Members of the Politburo Standing Committee of the 1st plenary session of the 12th Central Committee of the Chinese Communist Party
Rank	Officeholder	Hanzi	11th PSC	4th PLE	Birth	PM	Death	Birthplace	No. of offices	Ref.
1	Hu Yaobang	胡耀邦	Old	Renewed	1915	1933	1989	Hunan	One: Party office; General Secretary, Central Committee	
2	Ye Jianying	叶剑英	Old	Resigned	1897	1927	1986	Guangdong	Three: State office; Chairman, Standing Committee of the National People's Congress; Military offices; Vice Chairman, Central Military Commission of the Central Committee; Vice Chairman, Central Military Commission of the People's Republic of China	
3 (de facto 1)	Deng Xiaoping	邓小平	Old	Renewed	1904	1924	1997	Sichuan	Four: Party office; Chairman, Central Advisory Commission; Organisational office; Chairman, National Committee of the Chinese People's Political Consultative Conference (before 1983); Military offices; Chairman, Central Military Commission of the Central Committee; Chairman, Central Military Commission of the People's Republic of China (from 1983)	
4	Zhao Ziyang	赵紫阳	Old	Renewed	1919	1938	2005	Henan	Three: Party office; Leader, Central Leading Group for Financial and Economic Work of the Central Committee; State office; Premier, State Council of the People's Republic of China; Organisational office; Vice Chairman, National Committee of the Chinese People's Political Consultative Conference (before 1983)	
5	Li Xiannian	李先念	Old	Renewed	1909	1927	1992	Hubei	One: State office; President, People's Republic of China (from 1983)	
6	Chen Yun	陈云	Old	Renewed	1905	1925	1995	Shanghai	One: Party office; First Secretary, Standing Committee of the Central Commission for Discipline Inspection	

=== 4th plenary session (1985–1987) ===
Members of the Politburo Standing Committee of the 4th plenary session of the 12th Central Committee of the Chinese Communist Party
Rank	Officeholder	Hanzi	1st PLE	ENL	Birth	PM	Death	Birthplace	No. of offices	Ref.
1	Hu Yaobang	胡耀邦	Old	Renewed	1915	1933	1989	Hunan	One: Party office; General Secretary, Central Committee	
2 (de facto 1)	Deng Xiaoping	邓小平	Old	Renewed	1904	1924	1997	Sichuan	Three: Party office; Chairman, Central Advisory Commission; Military offices; Chairman, Central Military Commission of the Central Committee; Chairman, Central Military Commission of the People's Republic of China	
3	Zhao Ziyang	赵紫阳	Old	Renewed	1919	1938	2005	Henan	Two: Party office; Leader, Central Leading Group for Financial and Economic Work of the Central Committee; State office; Premier, State Council of the People's Republic of China	
4	Li Xiannian	李先念	Old	Renewed	1909	1927	1992	Hubei	One: State office; President, People's Republic of China	
5	Chen Yun	陈云	Old	Renewed	1905	1925	1995	Shanghai	One: Party office; First Secretary, Standing Committee of the Central Commission for Discipline Inspection	

=== Enlarged meeting of the Politburo (January–November 1987) ===
Members of the Politburo Standing Committee of the enlarged meeting of the 12th Politburo of the Chinese Communist Party
Rank	Officeholder	Hanzi	4th PLE	13th PSC	Birth	PM	Death	Birthplace	No. of offices	Ref.
1	Zhao Ziyang	赵紫阳	Old	Reelected	1919	1938	2005	Henan	Four: Party offices; General Secretary, Central Committee; Leader, Central Leading Group for Financial and Economic Work of the Central Committee; Military offices; Vice Chairman, Central Military Commission of the Central Committee; Vice Chairman, Central Military Commission of the People's Republic of China	
2 (de facto 1)	Deng Xiaoping	邓小平	Old	Not	1904	1924	1997	Sichuan	Three: Party office; Chairman, Central Advisory Commission; Military offices; Chairman, Central Military Commission of the Central Committee; Chairman, Central Military Commission of the People's Republic of China	
3	Li Xiannian	李先念	Old	Not	1909	1927	1992	Hubei	One: State office; President, People's Republic of China	
4	Chen Yun	陈云	Old	Not	1905	1925	1995	Shanghai	One: Party office; First Secretary, Standing Committee of the Central Commission for Discipline Inspection	
5	Hu Yaobang	胡耀邦	Old	Died	1915	1933	1989	Hunan	Held no office	
