= Director of the General Office of the Chinese Communist Party =

Chinese Communist Party position

Director of the General Office of the Central Committee of the Chinese Communist Party
- 中国共产党中央委员会办公厅主任
- Emblem of the Chinese Communist Party

- Flag of the Chinese Communist Party

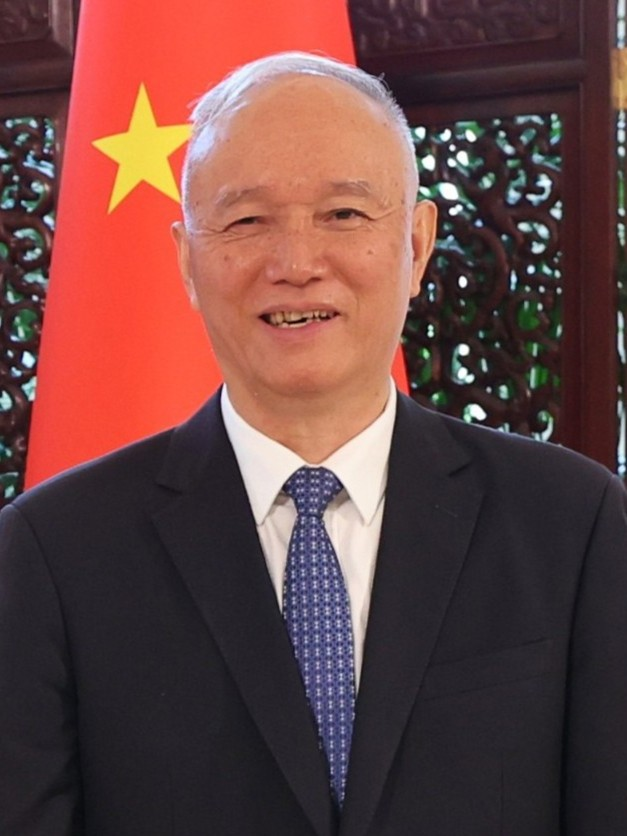
- Incumbent; Cai Qi since March 20, 2023
- General Office of the Chinese Communist Party
- Type: Department Head
- Status: Provincial and ministerial-level official
- Seat: Beijing
- Nominator: Central Committee
- Appointer: Central Committee
- Inaugural holder: Li Fuchun
- Formation: 1942; 84 years ago
- Deputy: Deputy Directors

The director of the General Office of the Central Committee of the Chinese Communist Party is the leader of the General Office of the Central Committee of the Chinese Communist Party (CCP). The director oversees the daily operations of the CCP Central Committee.

Although the General Office's business is often not overtly political, the directors have historically had close connections with the CCP's top leaders, and usually join the Politburo or the Secretariat after their period leading the General Office. The director of the General office has been informally referred to as the "Danei Zongguan" (大内总管), roughly translated as "the gatekeeper". While the director of the General Office is sometimes referred to as an analogue to the party General Secretary's "Chief of Staff", the general secretary also maintains a personal staff as part of the Office of the General Secretary, whose director may also, but not necessarily, conterminously hold the position of director of the General Office.

The current director of the General Office is Cai Qi, who is the fifth-ranking member of the Politburo Standing Committee of the Chinese Communist Party.

== List of directors ==
Director of the General Office of the Central Secretariat

Name	Start	End	Ref.
Li Fuchun	1942	October 1945	
Yang Shangkun	October 1945	May 1948	

Director of the General Office of the Central Committee

Name	Start	End	Ref.
Yang Shangkun	May 1948	November 1965	
Wang Dongxing	November 1965	December 1978	
Yao Yilin	December 1978	April 1982	
Hu Qili	April 1982	June 1983	
Qiao Shi	June 1983	April 1984	
Wang Zhaoguo	April 1984	April 1986	
Wen Jiabao	April 1986	March 1993	
Zeng Qinghong	March 1993	March 1999	
Wang Gang	March 1999	September 2007	
Ling Jihua	19 September 2007	31 August 2012	
Li Zhanshu	31 August 2012	November 2015	
Ding Xuexiang	15 November 2017	March 2023	
Cai Qi	March 2023	Incumbent	
