= Tang Wensheng =

Chinese interpreter for Mao Zedong and Zhou Enlai

- 唐闻生

Personal details
- Born: March 1943 (age 83) New York City, New York, U.S.
- Education: Beijing Foreign Studies University
- Occupation: Diplomat, interpreter

Tang Wensheng (Chinese: 唐闻生; born 1943) is an American-born Chinese diplomat. She played an important role during U.S. President Richard Nixon's historical 1972 visit to the People's Republic of China, serving as Mao Zedong's chief interpreter.

== Early life and career ==
Tang Wensheng, also known as Nancy Tang, was born in Brooklyn, New York City, in March 1943. Her father, Tang Mingzhao, was a Chinese academic had studied in the United States where he held a leadership position within the United States Communist Party during the 1930s, and later in his life served as Under Secretary-General for Political Affairs in the United Nations. In the early 1950s, Tang and her family moved to mainland China. Upon completing high school, she enrolled at the Beijing Institute of Foreign Languages (today known as the Beijing Foreign Studies University). Tang entered diplomatic service for the Chinese Foreign Ministry as an English interpreter. She was later recommended by fellow interpreter Ji Chaozhu, a family friend in New York, to be an interpreter for Chairman Mao Zedong and Premier Zhou Enlai of China.

== Role as interpreter ==
In 1972, U.S. President Richard Nixon made a historic visit to the People's Republic of China, which included a meeting with Chinese leader Mao Zedong. The meeting included President Nixon and National Security Advisor Henry Kissinger of the U.S. delegation, and Chairman Mao Zedong and Premier Zhou Enlai of the Chinese delegation. Tang served as an interpreter for the meeting, playing an important and essential role in China–United States relations.

In interviews, Tang has spoken about her experience as an interpreter at the 1972 meeting. On the topic of Nixon, Tang has said, "I do think that [the Chinese delegation] respected President Nixon very much, because he was a man of courage to come to a country as the President of the United States, which was a major superpower at that time, to a country with which it had no diplomatic relations...he was bold enough to do so, and he spoke very candidly". Tang has also said that the U.S. delegation initially came off as "condescending", before treating the Chinese delegation as "equals".

== Later career ==
After serving as interpreter for Chairman Mao and Premier Zhou, Tang continued her career at the Ministry of Foreign Affairs. She became a member of the Department of North American and Oceanian Affairs, and later Deputy Director General of the department. She also served as a member of the Chinese People's Political Consultative Conference (CPPCC), the Vice Chairman of the Hong Kong, Macau, Taiwan & Overseas Chinese Affairs Committee, Advisor to the All-China Federation of Returned Overseas Chinese, and Vice President of China Soong Ching Ling Foundation.
