= China Soong Ching Ling Foundation =

People's organization in China

- 中国宋庆龄基金会
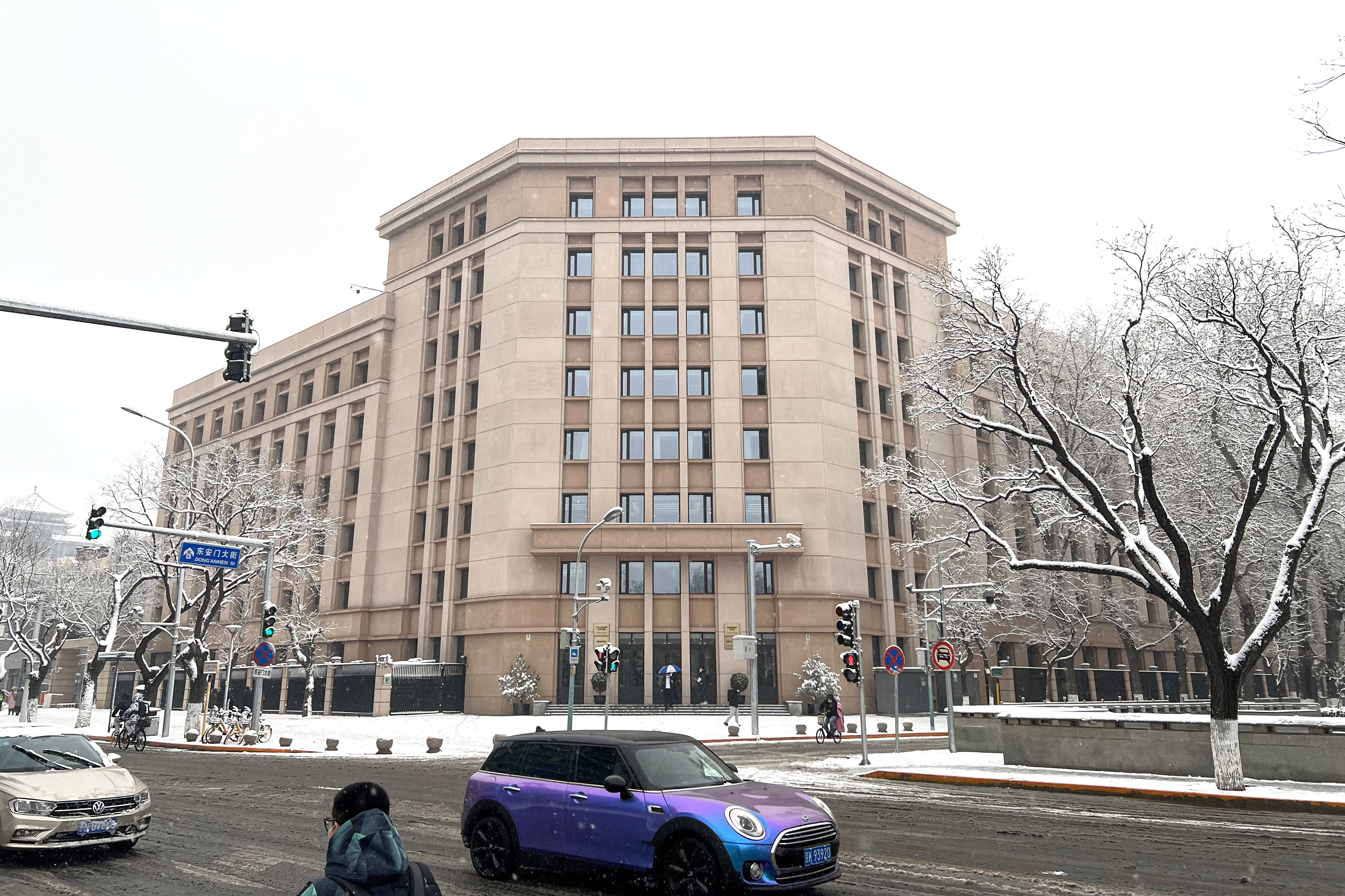
- Headquarters of the China Soong Ching Ling Foundation
- Formation: May 29, 1982
- Type: People's organization
- Headquarters: No. 82, Dong'anmen Street, Dongcheng, Beijing
- President: Li Bin
- Party Secretary: Shen Beili
- Parent organization: United Front Work Department
- Website: www.sclf.org

China Soong Ching Ling Foundation
- Simplified Chinese: 中国宋庆龄基金会
- Traditional Chinese: 中國宋慶齡基金會
Transcriptions
Standard Mandarin
- Hanyu Pinyin: Zhōngguó Sòngqìnglíng Jījīnhuì

The China Soong Ching Ling Foundation is a people's organization named after Soong Ching-ling, the honorary chairwoman of the People's Republic of China.

== History ==
On 29 May 1982, the establishment of the Children's Science Park Foundation in Memory of National Honorary Chairman Soong Ching Ling (纪念宋庆龄国家名誉主席儿童科学公园基金会). During the establishment preparation, it was decided the name had its limitations, and the "Children's Science Park" was removed from the organization's name. Afterwards, the draft charter was submitted to the CCP Secretariat, where it was approved by various leaders including Xi Zhongxun and Hu Qili, among others.

== Organizations ==
The Foundation is under the leadership of the United Front Work Department. The Foundation has the following organizational structure:

=== Internal organization ===
- Office
- Funding Department
- International Cooperation and Exchange Department (Hong Kong, Macao and Taiwan Affairs Department)
- Business Development Department
- Party Committee (Personnel Department)

=== Directly affiliated institutions ===
- China Soong Ching Ling Foundation Institutional Service Center
- Soong Ching Ling Former Residence Management Center (China Soong Ching Ling Foundation Research Center)
- China Soong Ching Ling Foundation Training and Exchange Center
- China Soong Ching Ling Youth Science and Technology Cultural Exchange Center

== Leaders ==
=== Honorary Chairman ===
1. Deng Xiaoping (May 1982–February 1997)

=== President ===
1. Kang Keqing (May 1982–April 1992)
2. Huang Hua (May 1992–March 2001)
3. Hu Qili (March 2001–November 2016)
4. Wang Jiarui (November 2016–December 2021)
5. Li Bin (December 2021–Incumbent)
