= 13th National Congress of the Chinese Communist Party =

1987 Chinese Communist Party conference

13th National Congress of the Chinese Communist Party 中国共产党第十三次全国代表大会
- The flag of the Chinese Communist Party before 1996
- Begins: October 25, 1987
- Ends: November 1, 1987
- Locations: Great Hall of the People, Beijing, China
- Previous event: 12th National Congress of the Chinese Communist Party (1982)
- Next event: 14th National Congress of the Chinese Communist Party (1992)
- Participants: 1,936 delegates
- Major events: Election of the 13th Central Committee and 13th Central Commission for Discipline Inspection
- Leader: Zhao Ziyang (Leader of the Chinese Communist Party)

13th National Congress of the Chinese Communist Party
- Traditional Chinese: 中國共產黨第十三次全國代表大會
- Simplified Chinese: 中国共产党第十三次全国代表大会
Transcriptions
Standard Mandarin
- Hanyu Pinyin: Zhōngguó Gòngchǎndǎng Dìshísāncì Quánguó Dàibiǎo Dàhuì

Abbreviation
- Chinese: 十三大
Transcriptions
Standard Mandarin
- Hanyu Pinyin: Shísān Dà

The 13th National Congress of the Chinese Communist Party was held in the Great Hall of the People in Beijing from 25 October to 1 November 1987. It was preceded by the 12th National Congress of the Chinese Communist Party and was succeeded by the 14th National Congress of the Chinese Communist Party. It was attended by 1,936 delegates and 61 'specially invited' delegates representing more than 46 million party members and included 200 foreign journalists who were invited to attend the opening and closing ceremonies. In addition, the Vice Chairman of the Standing Committee of the National People's Congress and the CPPCC National Committee, representatives from the National Federation of industry and commerce, non-party people, ethnic minorities and religious people were invited to this congress as audience.

The congress reaffirmed the correctness of the policy of reforms and the Open Door that was adopted during the Third Plenum of the 11th Congress in December 1978. It also saw the rejuvenation of the party leadership as veterans from the Long March retired and was replaced by younger and better educated technocrats.

== Agenda ==
The agenda for the Congress was as follows:

(1) To review and adopt the report of the 12th Central Committee of the Chinese Communist Party.

(2) To review the report made by the Advisory Committee of the Central Committee of the Chinese Communist Party.

(3)To review the report made by Commission of Discipline Inspection of the Central Committee.

(4) To adopt the recommend amendments to the Constitution of the Chinese Communist Party.

(5) Election of the 13th CCP Central Committee, the CCP Central Committee Advisory Committee and the CCP Central Committee for Discipline Inspection Commission.

== Significance of the Congress ==
=== Personnel change ===
Deng Xiaoping personally orchestrated the retirement of more than 90 party elders who were critics of market-oriented reforms adopted in the process of his Four Modernizations. The elders included Peng Chen, chairman of the Standing Committee of the National People's Congress; Chen Yun, leading party economist; Hu Qiaomu, harsh critic of bourgeois liberalism and Li Xiannian, the President of China. Deng himself relinquished all of his positions except his chairmanship of the Military Commission through a special party constitutional amendment.

Zhao Ziyang was arranged to become the first vice-chairman of the Central Military Commission with Yang Shangkun as its permanent vice-chairman. The new 285 member Central Committee consisted of 175 regulars and 110 alternate members. Around 150 aged leaders (43%) of the previous 348 members Central Committee failed to win reelection. Hua Guofeng was noted to have retained his membership in the central committee. Average age of the new ruling was 55.2 years, down from the 59.1 of its predecessor. 87 of the full and alternate members were new, and 209 (73%) of all Central Committee members were college educated.

The Politburo, with 17 regulars and 1 alternate member, was also packed with younger supporters of reform. Although nine of the 20 previous members retired, former General Secretary Hu Yaobang along with Vice-Premiers Wan Li and Tian Jiyun retained their memberships. The Standing Committee saw the election of Zhao Ziyang, Li Peng, Qiao Shi, Hu Qili and Yao Yilin.

Although most elders had relinquished their official positions in the party, their influence did not falter. Their willingness to retire was probably made with the understanding that their favorite choice, Li Peng, would be appointed to the Politburo Standing Committee as well as to the future premiership. Barely three weeks after the close of congress, Li was named acting premier, and later in the National People's Congress in March 1988, confirmed as premier.

The 13th National Congress was notable because women were entirely absent from the highest levels of the party, leader such as Zhao Ziyang strongly opposed the participation of women in the political process.

=== The primary stage of socialism ===
In his speech, Zhao Ziyang stated that "Reform is the only process through which China can be revitalized. It is a process which is irreversible and which accords with the will of the people and the general trend of events." Building socialism with Chinese features, Zhao announced, was an experiment that could not possibly have been foreseen by 19th-century European theorists. The central task of proclaiming market reforms was due to the fact of the widespread poverty and backwardness that existed throughout China.

The Chinese leadership reconciled to the idea that market mechanisms and central planning were both "neutral means and methods that do not determine the basic economic system of a society". Hence an adoption of capitalist techniques and management skills in a mixed economy through multi-ownership system was permissible at that stage.

=== Overall significance ===
The 13th Party Congress was remarkable in several ways. It launched China into accelerated economic development, ensuring a leadership succession as elder party members voluntarily resigned in favor of younger leaders, and fitting Marxism into "a new reality to fit reality" rather than bending "reality to theory".

However concerns remains over several issues. First, the resignation of party elders did not mean that reformers could get along with reforms right away since these elders still held immense influence over the party. Secondly, Deng has arranged Zhao to be the First Vice-Chairman of the Central Military Commission without the assurance that he would succeed Deng as the leader of China. Third, accelerated economic development and greater opening for foreign influences would revive old questions of "spiritual pollution", "bourgeois liberalization," and the perennial issue of "Chinese essence vs. foreign value." Fourth, separation of party functions from the government and economic enterprises would affect the vested interests of millions. Lastly, the supremacy of the Four Cardinal Principles prohibited any rule other than the CCP and any freedom beyond what was permitted by the party.

Overall, the Congress was a distinct success as it represented a consensus among disparate leaders to move the country forward economically but democracy, pluralism and human rights were issues were left unresolved.
