= Birdcage economy =

Chinese political expression

The birdcage economy (Chinese: 鸟笼经济; pinyin: Niǎolóng jīngjì) is a term that was proposed in 1980 by Chen Yun, a veteran of the Chinese Communist Party, to refer to his ideal vision for China's economic reforms. According to Chen, "the cage is the plan, and it may be large or small. But within the cage the bird [the economy] is free to fly as he wishes." With this, Chen wanted the Chinese economy to be opened up to a certain extent, not fully, with the state retaining a large role in the economy.

== History ==
in 1980, the Central Committee of the Chinese Communist Party was engaged in a fierce struggle between the two factions of Deng Xiaoping and Chen Yun. Deng insisted on the policy concept of one center and reform and opening up. He believed that the central task of the CCP should be to adhere to the central task of economic construction and the policy of comprehensive opening up. Deng also insisted on the "cat theory"; It doesn't matter if it's a white cat or a black cat, as long as it can catch mice, it's a good cat. Deng advocated that special economic zones should further absorb foreign investment, introduce advanced foreign technology and experience, and increase more foreign-funded enterprises. The policy concept proposed by Deng after his northward and southward tours was obviously more pragmatic and was supported by the people.

At that time, Deng's policy ideas were resisted by Chen Yun; Chen also attacked the special economic zones established by Deng, saying that the special economic zones were worthless. Deng advocated full opening up, while Chen advocated “birdcage economy”. Because at that time, China's economy was in the early stage of opening up, and there had been situations where it was chaotic when it was opened up and dead when it was controlled. Therefore, Chen Yun put forward his “birdcage economy” policy. Chen Yun wanted the economy to be opened up to a certain extent, not fully. He believed that if it was opened up to the outside world, capitalism would come like a flood, and the socialist economy would not be able to resist. Deng Xiaoping held the opposite opinion. He advocated a large-scale economic policy of full opening up.

In 1982, Chen Yun described the "birdcage economy" when he stated:

Liberalizing the economy should be done under the guidance of a plan, not independent of it. This is like the relationship between a bird and a cage. A bird cannot be held tightly in your hand, otherwise it will die. It must be allowed to fly, but only within the cage. Without a cage, the bird will fly away. If we say that the bird represents the liberalization of the economy, then the cage represents our national development plan. Of course, the size of the 'cage' should be suitable. It can be whatever size it needs to be. Economic activities are not necessarily limited to one province or one region. Under the guidance of the plan, economic activities can cross provinces and regions, even cross continents and countries. Additionally, the 'cage' can be frequently adjusted. For example, the adjustments we make to our Five Year Plans. However, no matter what, there must always be a cage.
