= Central Control Commission =

Central Control Commission (or committee or collegium) may refer to:

- Central Control Commission of the Communist Party of the Soviet Union
- Central Commission for Discipline Inspection
- Central Party Control Commission of the Socialist Unity Party of Germany
- Central Control Commission of the Polish United Workers' Party
- Central Collegium of the Romanian Communist Party
- Central Control Commission of the Communist Party of Vietnam
- Central Control Commission of the League of Communists of Yugoslavia
  - Central Control Commission of the League of Communists of Bosnia and Herzegovina
  - Central Control Commission of the League of Communists of Croatia
  - Central Control Commission of the League of Communists of Macedonia
  - Central Control Commission of the League of Communists of Montenegro
  - Central Control Commission of the League of Communists of Serbia
  - Central Control Commission of the League of Communists of Slovenia
- Central Control Committee of the Hungarian Working People's Party
- Central Control Committee of the Hungarian Socialist Workers' Party
- Central Control Commission of the Workers' Party of Korea
