= Hu Qili =

Chinese politician

- 胡启立

Politburo Standing Committee member of the Chinese Communist Party
- In office November 1987 – June 1989 Serving with Zhao Ziyang, Li Peng, Qiao Shi, Yao Yilin
- General Secretary: Zhao Ziyang

Director of the General Office of the Chinese Communist Party
- In office April 1982 – June 1983
- General Secretary: Hu Yaobang
- Preceded by: Yao Yilin
- Succeeded by: Qiao Shi

Personal details
- Born: 6 October 1929 (age 97) Yulin, Shaanxi, Republic of China
- Party: Chinese Communist Party
- Spouse(s): Hao Keming (郝克明, d. 2023)

Chinese name
- Traditional Chinese: 胡啟立
- Simplified Chinese: 胡启立
Transcriptions
Standard Mandarin
- Hanyu Pinyin: Hú Qǐlì
- Wade–Giles: Hu^{2} Ch'i^{3}-li^{4}

Hu Qili (Chinese: 胡启立; born 6 October 1929) is a former high-ranking politician of the Chinese Communist Party (CCP), known as a champion of the country's economic reform program in the 1980s. He was a leading member of the CCP Secretariat from 1985 to 1989 and a member of the CCP Politburo Standing Committee from 1987 to 1989. Following the 1989 Tiananmen Square protests and massacre, he was purged for his sympathy toward the student protesters and his support for General Secretary Zhao Ziyang's opposition to the use of armed force. However, he returned to politics in 1991. In 2001, he became chairman of the Soong Ching-ling Foundation.

As of April 2024, Hu Qili is the only living member of 13th Politburo Standing Committee of the CPC from the first three plenary sessions.

== Early career ==
Hu was born on 6 October 1929 in Yulin, Shaanxi Province. In 1946, he was admitted to Peking University to pursue a major in physics. In 1948, at the age of 19, Hu joined the CCP. When the People's Republic of China was founded in 1949, Hu changed his studies to focus on politics.

From 1951 to 1956, Hu was secretary of the Communist Youth League Committee of Peking University. From 1956 to 1966, he served as the president of the All-China Students' Federation. In 1958, Hu was granted an audience with CCP Chairman Mao Zedong.

During the Cultural Revolution, Hu began to work in the lower levels of the May Seventh Cadre Schools. From 1972 to 1977, he served as the deputy secretary of the Ningxia County Communist Party Committee, the deputy secretary of the Guyuan district Communist Party Committee, and the office director of the Ningxia Hui Autonomous Region Party Committee.

After the Cultural Revolution, he served as the deputy president of Tsinghua University. From 1978 to 1980, Hu was a member of the Secretariat of the Communist Youth League Central Committee and was president of the All-China Youth Federation. From 1980 to 1982, he was the party secretary and the mayor of Tianjin. From 1982 to 1987, he was the director of the General Office, a member of the Secretariat, and a member of the Politburo of the CCP Central Committee. From 1985 to 1989, Hu served as a leading member CCP Secretariat, so a potential future candidate for General Secretary (party leader). From 1987 to 1989, Hu served as a member of the Politburo Standing Committee and the Secretariat of the CCP Central Committee.

== 1989 Tiananmen Square protests and massacre ==
On 15 April 1989, after the death of former General Secretary Hu Yaobang, Beijing university students began to assemble in Tiananmen Square to protest. This was the beginning of the Tiananmen Democracy Movement. General Secretary Zhao Ziyang thought that the government should talk with the student protestors. As a member of the Politburo Standing Committee and a member of the Secretariat, Hu was placed in charge of propaganda. Hu followed Zhao's instructions and began a propaganda policy for openness and tolerance in engaging the students in dialogue.

On 29 April 1989, the People’s Daily published an editorial titled, Keep Stable, Keep Overall Situation. Hu commented that the Beijing student protesters had begun to act reasonably and that the Chinese government needed to offer more accurate news for the students. He also believed that the student movement should be reported on accurately and without misinformation. Hu also agreed with Zhao Ziyang's speech. On 3 May 1989, Zhao made a speech to commemorate the May Fourth Movement on its 70th anniversary. In the speech, he stated that the Beijing student protesters loved China and called for continued talks with the student leaders.

On 19 May 1989, there was an evening meeting to brief the Politburo Standing Committee. Zhao refused to accept the command to institute martial law as proposed by Premier Li Peng. Zhao and Hu were the only two members of the Standing Committee opposed to martial law. This began the downturn of Hu's political fortunes.

The Fourth Plenum of the Thirteenth Central Committee was held on 23 and 24 June 1989. They approved a decision made two days earlier at a meeting of the Politburo to strip Hu and Zhao as well as Rui Xingwen and Yan Mingfu of their party posts. For a period of time, Hu was expelled from politics in China.

== Return to government ==
In 1991, Hu returned to politics and was appointed vice minister and Leading Party Members' Group member of the Ministry of the Machine-Building and Electronics Industry. From 1993 to 1998, he was the minister of the Ministry of the Machine-Building and Electronics Industry.

In 1998, Hu was elected vice chairman of the Chinese People's Political Consultative Conference. He had a mandate to restore proper political treatment of leaders of the party and state. By convention, persons who hold the positions of the vice chairman of the NPC, vice chairman of the CPPCC, or higher positions are referred to as "Leaders of the Party and the State" (党和国家领导人) in the official media.

Hu became chairman of the China Soong Ching Ling Foundation in 2001, which deals with Chinese charities and welfare projects. Hu retired from that position in November 2016.

Party political offices
Preceded by Yao Yilin	Director of the General Office of the Chinese Communist Party; 1982–1983	Succeeded by Qiao Shi
Preceded by Chen Weida	Mayor of Tianjin; 1980–1982	Succeeded by Li Ruihuan
Preceded by Zou Jiahua	Minister of Electronic Industry; 1993–1998	Succeeded by office abolished
Order of precedence
Preceded by Hu Jintao as Former General Secretary of the Chinese Communist Party	Order of precedence of China as Former Member of the Politburo Standing Committee of the Chinese Communist Party	Succeeded by Li Ruihuan as Former Member of the Politburo Standing Committee of the Chinese Communist Party
