= Standing Committee of the Central Commission for Discipline Inspection =

Organ of the Chinese Communist Party

The Standing Committee is the highest organ of the Central Commission for Discipline Inspection (CCDI) when the CCDI is not convened in a plenary session. It is composed of the secretary, deputy secretaries, secretaries general and other members. The composition of a standing committee is elected by the CCDI plenary session and approved by the CCP Central Committee at one of its plenary sessions. To be an eligible candidate for standing committee membership, one has to be an ordinary CCDI member.

The 11th National Congress, held 12–18 August 1977, added a stipulation about a "Central Commission for Discipline Inspection" but did not establish one. The 3rd Plenary Session of the 11th Central Committee, held on 18–22 December 1978, established the 11th CCDI and the 11th Standing Committee. The first constitutional stipulation on the Standing Committee was introduced by the 12th National Congress, held on 1–11 September 1982, which stated that the CCDI could elect members to the Standing Committee at one of its plenary sessions.

== Duties and responsibilities ==
The duties and responsibilities of the CCDI Standing Committee are regulated by the Constitution of the Chinese Communist Party and the body's internal regulations. The CCP Constitution mentions the CCDI Standing Committee twice. Article 45 states that the plenary session of the CCDI is empowered to elect the composition of the standing committee and that the results need to be approved by the CCP Central Committee to go into force. In its second mention, in Article 42, the CCDI Standing Committee is given the power to examine all warnings and severe warnings meted out to members and alternates of the CCP Central Committee. Only after the CCDI Standing Committee has examined the issue at hand will the case be delegated to the CCP Central Committee. The regulations further clarify the CCDI Standing Committee's powers. Article 11 states that the CCDI Standing Committee is responsible for convening and presiding over CCDI plenary sessions. The CCDI Standing Committee is to meet on a "regular basis", and its meetings are convened and presided over by the CCDI secretary. The secretary also sets the agenda of the meetings. The eligible quorum for CCDI Standing Committee is at the bare minimum over 50 per cent, but over two-thirds are needed to discuss and adopt personnel changes.

To resolve contentious issues, votes are taken. If multiple cases are being addressed at a meeting, each item on the agenda will be voted on separately. Depending on the nature of the matter being discussed, the voting may be conducted either orally, by show of hands, or by secret ballot. For an item to become effective, more than 50 per cent of the members in attendance must vote in favor of it.

The standing committee is responsible to the CCDI plenary session it presides over and must carry out its adopted decisions, as well as the decisions of the CCP Central Committee. When the CCDI plenary session is adjourned, its duties and responsibilities are delegated to the CCDI Standing Committee. In the period between two plenary sessions the CCDI Standing Committee has to implement the decisions of the last national congress and report on its work to the CCP Central Committee. Moreover, it can decide on disciplinary issues, review inner-party regulations and other normative documents per its authority, hear reports on various cases, discuss sanctions and punishment of members who violate party discipline and sanction or the removal of members of the CCDI. The decision to remove CCDI members will go into force once the CCP Central Committee has approved the decision.

== Bibliography ==
=== Books ===
- Trinh, Duy (2023). "Chapter 12: The Where and Why of Political Protection in Vietnam's Anti-Corruption Campaign". In Truong, Nhu; Vu, Tuong (eds.). The Dragon's Underbelly: Dynamics and Dilemmas in Vietnam's Economy and Politics. ISEAS–Yusof Ishak Institute. pp. 342–366. ISBN 9789815011395.
- Tian, Gaiwei (2020). "Chapter 6: China's Discipline Inspection and Supervision System". In Fang, Ning (ed.). China's Political System. China Social Sciences Press and Springer Publishing Company. doi:10.1007/978-981-15-8362-9_6. ISBN 978-981-15-8362-9.

=== Regulations ===
- 中国共产党章程 [Constitution of the Chinese Communist Party] (in Chinese). 20th National Congress of the Chinese Communist Party. 22 October 2022. Archived from the original on 6 November 2023.
- 中国共产党纪律检查委员会工作条例 [Regulation on the Work of the Discipline Inspection Commission of the Chinese Communist Party] (in Chinese). Politburo of the Chinese Communist Party. 24 December 2021. Archived from the original on 6 November 2023.
