= 11th National Congress of the Chinese Communist Party =

1977 Chinese Communist Party conference

11th National Congress of the Chinese Communist Party 中国共产党第十一次全国代表大会
- The flag of the Chinese Communist Party before 1996
- Begins: August 12, 1977
- Ends: August 18, 1977
- Locations: Great Hall of the People, Beijing, China
- Previous event: 10th National Congress of the Chinese Communist Party (1973)
- Next event: 12th National Congress of the Chinese Communist Party (1982)
- Participants: 1,510 delegates
- Major events: Election of the 11th Central Committee
- Leader: Hua Guofeng (Leader of the Chinese Communist Party)

11th National Congress of the Chinese Communist Party
- Traditional Chinese: 中國共產黨第十一次全國代表大會
- Simplified Chinese: 中国共产党第十一次全国代表大会
Transcriptions
Standard Mandarin
- Hanyu Pinyin: Zhōngguó Gòngchǎndǎng Dìshíyī cì Quánguó Dàibiǎo Dàhuì

Abbreviated name
- Chinese: 十一大
Transcriptions
Standard Mandarin
- Hanyu Pinyin: Shíyī dà

The 11th National Congress of the Chinese Communist Party was held in the Great Hall of the People, Beijing, between August 12–18, 1977, about five years before the 12th National Congress, and four years after the 10th National Congress. 1,510 delegates represented the party's estimated 35 million members.

The Congress formally declared the Cultural Revolution officially over after 11 years, ending a long chapter of Chinese history. The Gang of Four were fully criticized for their role in the revolution. However, it also affirmed the "success" of the revolution and declared that class struggle would remain the hallmark of Chinese socialism. Hua Guofeng was formally elected as Chairman of the 11th Central Committee of the Chinese Communist Party and was elected to the chairmanship of the Central Military Commission. The Political Bureau was also renewed with new memberships when the 11th Politburo was elected as a result of the congress.
