= Qiao Shi =

Former Politburo Standing Committee member of the Chinese Communist Party

- 乔石
- Qiao Shi in 1994

6th Chairman of the Standing Committee of the National People's Congress
- In office 27 March 1993 – 16 March 1998
- Preceded by: Wan Li
- Succeeded by: Li Peng

Secretary of the Central Commission for Discipline Inspection
- In office November 1, 1987 – October 18, 1992
- Preceded by: Chen Yun (first secretary)
- Succeeded by: Wei Jianxing

Secretary of the Central Political and Legal Affairs Commission
- In office July 1985 – November 1992
- Preceded by: Chen Pixian
- Succeeded by: Ren Jianxin

Director of the General Office of the Chinese Communist Party
- In office June 1983 – April 1984
- General Secretary: Hu Yaobang
- Preceded by: Hu Qili
- Succeeded by: Wang Zhaoguo

Personal details
- Born: 24 December 1924 Shanghai, Republic of China
- Died: 14 June 2015 (aged 90) Beijing, China
- Party: Chinese Communist Party (1940–1998)
- Spouse: Yu Wen (m. 1952; died 2013)
- Children: 2 sons and 2 daughters

Qiao Shi
- Traditional Chinese: 喬石
- Simplified Chinese: 乔石
Transcriptions
Standard Mandarin
- Hanyu Pinyin: Qiáo Shí
- Wade–Giles: Ch'iao^{2} Shih^{2}
- IPA: [tɕʰjǎʊ ʂɨ̌]
Yue: Cantonese
- Yale Romanization: Kiùh Sehk
- Jyutping: Kiu^{4} Sek^{6}
- IPA: [kʰiw˩ sɛk̚˨]

Qiao Shi (24 December 1924 – 14 June 2015) was a Chinese politician and one of the top leaders of the Chinese Communist Party (CCP). He was a member of the party's top decision-making body, the Politburo Standing Committee, from 1987 to 1997. He was a contender for the paramount leadership of China, but lost out to his political rival Jiang Zemin, who assumed the post of General Secretary of the party in 1989. Qiao Shi instead served as Chairman of the National People's Congress, then the third-ranked political position, from 1993 until his retirement in 1998. Compared with his peers, including Jiang Zemin, Qiao Shi adopted a more liberal stance in political and economic policy, promoting the rule of law and market-oriented reform of state-owned enterprises.

== Early life ==
Qiao Shi was born Jiang Zhitong (蔣志彤; Jiǎng Zhìtóng) in December 1924 in Shanghai. His father was from Dinghai, Zhejiang province and worked as an accountant in Shanghai. His mother was a worker at Shanghai No. 1 Textile Mill. He studied literature at East China Associated University, but did not graduate. He adopted the nom de guerre Jiang Qiaoshi after becoming involved with underground revolutionary activities when he was sixteen years old, as was common practice at the time for young aspiring Communists. He eventually dropped the surname Jiang altogether and simply went by "Qiao Shi". He joined the CCP in August 1940, and became involved with the anti-Kuomintang student movement in his youth. His specialty was intelligence and security.

== Mao era ==
After the People's Republic of China was established in 1949, Qiao Shi served as a leader of the Communist Youth League in Hangzhou, Zhejiang province until 1954. From 1954 to 1962, he worked at Anshan Iron and Steel Company in Liaoning province, and then Jiuquan Iron and Steel Company in Gansu province. In 1963, Qiao Shi was transferred to the International Liaison Department (ILD) of the Central Committee of the Chinese Communist Party. He was recognized as an expert in international studies, and travelled widely to other communist countries. However, he was severely persecuted when the Cultural Revolution began in 1966, because his wife Yu Wen was a niece of Chen Bulei, a key advisor to the Kuomintang leader Chiang Kai-shek. He underwent numerous struggle sessions, which caused him to be hospitalized for duodenal ulcer and blood loss. In 1969, Qiao Shi and his wife were sent to work in rural labour camps, first in Heilongjiang, and later in Henan province. He was able to return to the ILD in 1971, when Geng Biao became Director of the department.

== Rise to power ==
After the end of the Cultural Revolution, Qiao Shi became the deputy director of ILD in 1978, and Director in 1982, responsible for managing relationships with foreign communist parties. He also became an alternate member of the central Secretariat, the day-to-day executive arm of the party organization. Subsequently, he also held the positions of director of the CCP General Office, in charge of routine party administration, and of the head of the Organization Department, in charge of human resources. Under his directorship, the General Office changed its focus from class struggle to economic development, as part of the reform and opening-up policy.In 1985, Chinese spy chief Yu Qiangsheng defected to the United States, causing Politburo member and Political and Legal Affairs Commission Secretary Chen Pixian to be demoted. Qiao Shi was then selected to fill the void, partly due to his proximity to General Secretary Hu Yaobang and earning the approval of paramount leader Deng Xiaoping. In that year, Qiao Shi was elected to the Politburo of the Communist Party, the second highest rung of power. In 1986, he became a Vice Premier of the State Council. From 1987 to 1997, Qiao Shi was a member of the Politburo Standing Committee, China's top decision-making body, overseeing the broad portfolios of internal security, intelligence, justice, and party discipline. From 1987 to 1992, he also served as the Secretary of the Central Commission for Discipline Inspection, the party's agency in charge of anti-corruption efforts.

=== Tiananmen Square and aftermath ===
Qiao Shi was thought to have played a key role during the Tiananmen Square protests of 1989, but it is uncertain whether he supported or opposed the crackdown against the student protesters. Most sources, including the autobiography of General Secretary Zhao Ziyang, said that Qiao Shi held an ambivalent position on how to deal with the protests. He was said to be tolerant of the student movement, and abstained from a May 1989 Politburo vote on whether to send the army to Tiananmen Square.

Qiao Shi managed to keep his leadership position when his Politburo colleagues Zhao Ziyang and Hu Qili, who opposed the crackdown, were purged. In the political aftermath of Tiananmen Square, Qiao Shi and Premier Li Peng were touted as two of the top candidates to lead the party. However, Deng and many party elders felt that Li Peng was too far left and unwilling to transition China out of a planned economy to take the top job. Qiao Shi therefore appeared to be a 'default' choice based on his experience and seniority at the time. Deng personally arranged a meeting with Qiao Shi to discuss the leadership question. However, Qiao Shi eventually lost out to his rival, Shanghai Party Committee Secretary Jiang Zemin, who assumed the party's leading post in 1989 and the presidency in 1993.

It was never made clear why Qiao Shi did not get the nod to become party leader. Observers speculated that Qiao Shi had too much prior experience in law enforcement and therefore was more prone to hardline, aggressive tactics to deal with issues, or that Qiao Shi had lost favour with important "party elders" – retired leaders who nevertheless held significant influence in the leadership succession process. Qiao Shi instead became Chairman of the Standing Committee of the National People's Congress in March 1993, officially ranked third in political positions in the People's Republic of China, after General Secretary and Premier. As head of the national legislature, he tried to strengthen China's legal system and turn the national congress from a rubber-stamp body into an institution with real power in establishing the rule of law. Dissident leader and Tiananmen student leader Wang Dan once commented, "Although Qiao Shi is a master of illusions, it's possible that he could lead China toward more enlightened rule."

=== Relationship with Jiang Zemin ===
After 1989, Qiao Shi was known to have a tense relationship with the newly appointed General Secretary Jiang Zemin. Jiang, who had overnight climbed from a municipal leader to Leader of the Chinese Communist Party, was a mere Politburo member at the time he was called up to Beijing to take the reins (Qiao was a Standing Committee member, one rank above Jiang). Qiao was a party veteran who had served the central organization for over a decade, while Jiang never had any experience in the centre. Qiao also had a glowing resume with revolutionary credentials during his days as a student agitator in Shanghai; Jiang's revolutionary experience appeared unsubstantial by comparison. As a result, it was not lost on political observers and those in the highest echelons of power that Jiang had 'leapfrogged' over Qiao, who by all measures seemed more qualified, had better credentials, and had a wider political network compared to Jiang. Moreover, Qiao Shi's time as China's law enforcement chief meant that he had trusted aides staffed in key positions around the country, which was seen as a dormant threat if not an explicit challenge to Jiang's leadership. After Deng Xiaoping's southern tour in 1992, many believe that Deng would remove Jiang Zemin from the position of General Secretary with Qiao Shi as the replacement and replacing Premier Li Peng with reformer Vice Premier Zhu Rongji due to Jiang and Li's relatively conservative approach towards economic reform which has resulted in a halt of reform and opening policy and a slowdown of economic growth between 1989 and 1991. This has not happened due to the quick switch side of Jiang Zemin and Li Peng from the more conservative side led by Chen Yun to the more reform side led by Deng Xiaoping in April 1992.

== Retirement ==
After the death of China's paramount leader Deng Xiaoping in 1997, Jiang Zemin succeeded in excluding Qiao Shi from the CCP Central Committee and the Politburo at the 15th National Congress of the Chinese Communist Party by lowering the retirement age for party officials to 70 years of age, consolidating his power. In 1998, Qiao Shi, then 73, retired from politics, and largely stayed out of the public eye thereafter.

While Qiao Shi left active politics in 1998, his tenure in the highest echelons of the party and government earned him the distinction of holding the largest number of key offices compared to any of his contemporaries or any leader in succeeding generations. Among other things, Qiao Shi was at one point the top official in charge of party administration, organization and human resources, ideological indoctrination, internal discipline, intelligence, internal security, legislation, law enforcement, and the justice system. (Note: By comparison, "security czar" Zhou Yongkang (Standing Committee term 2007–2012) was responsible for intelligence, security, and law enforcement, but was never part of the party administration and organization systems.) By virtue of his Standing Committee membership, Qiao Shi remained the top official in charge of law enforcement even during his term as the chairman of the National People's Congress.

Unlike his peers, most notably Jiang Zemin and Li Peng, Qiao Shi did not attend even the most important events on the Chinese political calendar after he retired, including the successive party congresses, National People's Congresses, the opening ceremonies of the Beijing Olympics, or various anniversaries of historical events. In 2012, he published the book Qiao Shi On Democracy and Rule of Law, which received significant attention from both domestic and international media. That Qiao Shi, a normally low-profile figure content with retirement, would publish such a work in his old age led to speculation that the book was a veiled criticism against the perceived deterioration of the legal and security portfolio under security chief Zhou Yongkang. In 2014, Qiao Shi donated 11 million yuan to the China Legal Exchange Foundation, whose goal was to promote justice and the rule of law.

== Decline and death ==
Qiao Shi died on 14 June 2015 in Beijing at the age of 90. In his official obituary, Qiao Shi was extolled as "an excellent Party member, a time-tested fighter for the communist cause, and an outstanding proletarian revolutionary, statesman and leader of the Party and the state". Qiao Shi was the first major leader from the third-generation of leadership to have died. His obituary numbered over 2,000 Chinese characters, half of the length of the obituaries of second-generation stalwarts Deng Xiaoping and Chen Yun, but far higher than the word count of the obituaries of Hua Guofeng, Liu Huaqing, and Huang Ju, who were each given a mere few hundred words. The announcement of his death was the third item on the evening Xinwen Lianbo program; the announcement was made in the form of a "joint statement" by the top organs of the party and state, which is generally reserved for only the highest-ranked leaders.

Flags were flown at half-mast in mourning of Qiao Shi's death. Qiao's send-off ceremony took place at the Babaoshan Revolutionary Cemetery on 19 June 2015. It was attended by President and Communist Party General Secretary Xi Jinping, Premier Li Keqiang, and all the other sitting members of the Politburo Standing Committee except for Zhang Gaoli, who at the time was away on a visit to Europe. Former general secretary Hu Jintao also attended. Jiang Zemin did not attend the funeral proceedings, but state news agencies made special mention of Jiang expressing his condolences; Jiang and his family sent a wreath to the ceremony. Qiao died just one month before his predecessor, former Chairman Wan Li died on 15 July 2015.

== Family ==
Qiao Shi married Yu Wen (郁文; 1926–2013) in early 1952. They had met when they were both working for the underground Communist Party in Shanghai in the 1940s. They had two daughters and two sons. Their eldest son, Jiang Xiaoming (蒋小明; born 1953), earned a doctorate in economics at the University of Cambridge in the United Kingdom. Their younger daughter, Qiao Xiaoxi (乔晓溪), studied medicine at Baylor University and worked in the United States. They had two other children, son Jiang Xiaodong (蒋小东) and daughter Qiao Ling (乔凌). Qiao's family is largely scandal free and has never been the target of overseas media speculation or criticism, unlike the families of other top Communist officials.

== Honours ==
In April 1996, Qiao Shi was awarded an honorary citizenship by the Cuban capital Havana, and an honorary doctorate in law by the University of Regina of Canada.

== Notes ==
Assembly seats
Preceded by Wan Li	Chairman of the Standing Committee of the National People's Congress; 1993–1998	Succeeded by Li Peng
Party political offices
Preceded by Hu Qili	Director of the General Office of the Chinese Communist Party; 1983–1984	Succeeded by Wang Zhaoguo
Preceded by Song Renqiong	Head of the Organization Department of the Chinese Communist Party; 1984–1985	Succeeded by Wei Jianxing
Preceded by Ji Pengfei	Head of the International Department of the Chinese Communist Party; 1982–1983	Succeeded by Qian Liren
Preceded by Chen Pixian	Secretary of the Central Political and Legal Affairs Commission; 1985–1992	Succeeded by Ren Jianxin
Preceded by Chen Yun (first secretary)	Secretary of the Central Commission for Discipline Inspection; 1987–1992	Succeeded by Wei Jianxing
Preceded by Gao Yang	President of the Central Party School; 1989–1993	Succeeded by Hu Jintao
