= Chen Yun =

Chinese statesman (1905–1995)

- 陈云
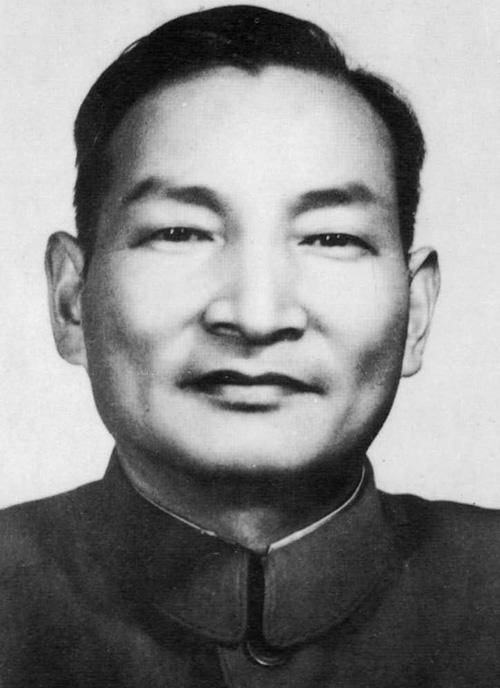

2nd Chairman of the Central Advisory Commission
- In office 2 November 1987 – 12 October 1992
- General Secretary: Zhao Ziyang; Jiang Zemin
- Preceded by: Deng Xiaoping
- Succeeded by: Post abolished

6th First Secretary of the Central Commission for Discipline Inspection
- In office 22 December 1978 – 31 October 1987
- General Secretary: Hu Yaobang; Zhao Ziyang
- Preceded by: New Office (Dong Biwu in 1968)
- Succeeded by: Qiao Shi (Secretary)

Vice Chairman of the Chinese Communist Party
- In office 28 September 1956 – 1 August 1966
- Chairman: Mao Zedong
- In office 18 December 1978 – 12 September 1982
- Chairman: Hua Guofeng; Hu Yaobang

Vice Premier of the State Council of the People's Republic of China
- In office 27 September 1954 – 17 January 1975
- Premier: Zhou Enlai
- In office 1 July 1979 – 10 September 1980
- Premier: Hua Guofeng

Vice Premier of the Government Administration Council of the Central People's Government of the People's Republic of China
- In office 19 October 1949 – 27 September 1954
- Premier: Zhou Enlai

Personal details
- Born: 13 June 1905 Qingpu, Qing Empire (today part of Shanghai, People's Republic of China)
- Died: 10 April 1995 (aged 89) Beijing, China
- Party: Chinese Communist Party (1925–1995)
- Spouse: Yu Ruomu

Chen Yun (Note: simplified Chinese: 陈云; traditional Chinese: 陳雲; pinyin: Chén Yún, pronounced [ʈʂʰə̌n y̌n]) (13 June 1905 – 10 April 1995) was a statesman and served as Vice Chairman of the Central Committee of the People's Republic of China. He was one of the most prominent leaders during the periods when China was governed by Mao Zedong and later by Deng Xiaoping. In the 1980s, Chen was considered the second most powerful figure in China, ranking only behind Deng Xiaoping. Chen Yun was also known as Liao Chenyun (廖陈云), as he took his uncle's (Liao Wenguang; 廖文光) family name when he was adopted by him after his parents died.

A major Chinese Communist Party (CCP) political figure before the establishment of the PRC, Chen first joined the CCP Central Committee in 1931, and the Politburo in 1934. He became the head of the CCP's Organization Department in 1937, and became one of CCP leader Mao Zedong's close advisors. He played an important role in the Yan'an Rectification Movement of 1942, and started becoming responsible for economic affairs that year, ultimately heading the Central Finance and Economic Commission from 1949.

After the establishment of the PRC, Chen was a key figure in moderating many of Mao's radical economic ideas and participated in the drafting of the First five-year plan. Chen was instrumental in China's economic reconstruction following the disastrous Great Leap Forward (1958–1960) along with Deng Xiaoping and Zhou Enlai, advocating for a "bird cage" economy in which the market economy should be allowed to play a role but kept contained like a "bird in a cage". Chen was demoted during the Cultural Revolution though he returned to power after Mao's death in 1976.

After Deng Xiaoping's rehabilitation, Chen voiced his criticism of Maoist policies, decrying China's lack of economic policies, and later became one of the architects of Deng's reform and opening up policy. During the 1980s and the 1990s, Chen was regarded as the second-most powerful person in China after Deng and was later recognized as one of the Eight Elders of the Chinese Communist Party. Initially a strong advocate for the reform and opening up, Chen increasingly became conservative towards the reforms as they progressed, becoming a key figure in slowing many reforms and becoming the leader of CCP's conservative factions. Chen resigned from the Central Committee in 1987 though keeping his influence as the chairman of the Central Advisory Commission until 1992, when he fully retired from politics.

== Early life ==
Chen was born in Qingpu, Jiangsu (now part of Shanghai) in 1905. Chen was a typesetter for the famous Commercial Press of Shanghai, which printed revolutionary books and even Protestant Bibles. He played a prominent role as a younger organizer in the labor movement during the early and mid-1920s. Chen joined the Chinese Communist Party (CCP) in 1925. Following the May Thirtieth Movement of 1925, Chen was an important organizer under Zhou Enlai and Liu Shaoqi. For a time, Zhou and Yun resided at a Church of Christ in Changting which was the site of a revolutionary committee. After Chiang Kai-shek turned against the CCP in 1927, Chen fled to his hometown, but soon returned to Shanghai and secretly continued his work as a labor unionist.

Chen was one of the few Communist Party organizers from an urban working-class background; he worked underground as a union organizer in the late 1920s, participated in the Long March, and served on the Central Committee from 1931 to 1987. He became a member of the Politburo Standing Committee in 1933. He was active throughout his career in the field of economics, despite receiving no formal education after elementary school.

== Early Communist Party career ==
He served on the Central Committee in the Third Plenary Session of 6th Central Committee of CCP in 1930 and became a member of the Politburo in 1934. In 1933 he evacuated to Ruijin, in Jiangxi province, the headquarters of the CCP's main "soviet" area. He was in overall charge of the Party's "white areas" work, that is, underground activities in places not under Party control. On the Long March he was one of the four Standing Committee members of the Political Bureau who attended the January 1935 Zunyi Conference. He left the Long March sometime in the spring of 1935, returning to Shanghai, and in September 1935 he went to Moscow, serving as one of the CCP's representatives to the Comintern sent by the Fifth Plenum Politburo, although he did not take part in the work of the delegation because he was sent to the Stalingrad Tractor Factory as a punishment for his participation in the Luo Zhanglong faction.

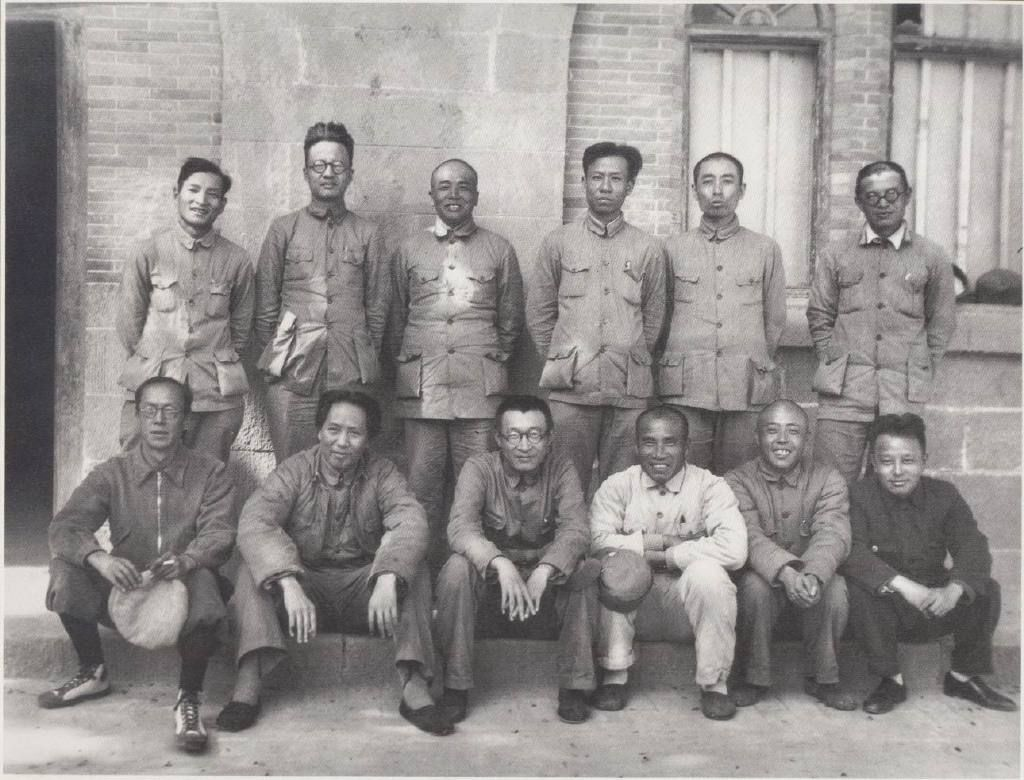
Members of the presidium of the Sixth Plenary Session of the Sixth Central Committee in 1938. (From left to right in the front row: Kang Sheng, Mao Zedong, Wang Jiaxiang, Zhu De, Xiang Ying, Wang Ming; from left to right in the back row: Chen Yun, Bo Gu, Peng Dehuai, Liu Shaoqi, Zhou Enlai, Zhang Wentian)

In 1937 Chen returned to China as an adviser to the Xinjiang leader Sheng Shicai. Chen later joined Mao in Yan'an, probably before the end of 1937. In November 1937 he became director of the Party's Organization Department, serving in that capacity until 1944, and by the early 1940s was in the inner circle of Mao's advisers. His writings on organization, ideology, and cadre training were included in the important study materials for the Yan'an Rectification Movement of 1942, a campaign of political persecutions which consolidated Mao's power within the Party. During this time, it is known that he protected some comrades accused of being Trotskyites, and criticized the exaggerations of the campaign in the Shandong base area.

Chen's economic career began in 1942, when he was replaced by Ren Bishi as head of the CCP Organization Department. In his new position, Chen was assigned responsibility for the financial management of Northwest China. Two years later, he was identified as responsible for finance in the Shaan-Gan-Ning Border Region as well. He added Northeast China to his portfolio in 1946 (then under the overall leadership of General Lin Biao and Political Commissar Peng Zhen).

During the middle of the 1940s, Chen was a major contributor to the party's strategy of "economic warfare." Under this concept, reviving the economy in liberated areas was a major contribution to the revolutionary struggle. Chen argued that economic development and production were critical, explaining that "[o]nly if we can solve the problem of food and clothing for the masses can we become leaders of the masses. Thus, a revolutionary businessman is an outright revolutionary."

A main challenge for the Communists during this period was driving out the Nationalist's competing currency and replacing it with the currencies used in the revolutionary base areas. Chen argued that the approach should rely on both economic and political mechanisms (as opposed to prohibition), including regulating the value of competing currencies and controlling trade in key commodities. Another Chen Yun's contribution to the early development of the Chinese economy was his stabilization of prices in Shanghai after the Nationalist government failed to curb the financial crisis caused by speculations of corporate monopolies.

== Political career under Mao ==
In May 1949, Chen Yun was named head of the new national Central Finance and Economic Commission. In July 1948, he was appointed to lead the newly established Northeastern Financial and Economic Commission. The Northeast Administrative Commission formed the Northeastern Economic Planning Committee (the primary bureaucratic body responsible for economic planning in Manchuria region), with Chen as the committee's head.

In early 1952, Zhou Enlai led a team to draft the first Five-Year Plan which included Chen, Bo Yibo, Li Fuchun and General Nie Rongzhen. Zhou, Chen and Li presented the draft to Soviet experts in Moscow, who rejected it. In early 1953, Gao Gang and the State Planning Commission began work on what would eventually become the final version. After Gao's political downfall, Chen Yun, Bo Yibo, Li Fuchuan and (later) Li Xiannian would manage the Chinese economy for more than 30 years. Chen would be appointed as Vice Premier of China in 1954.

In July 1958, Chen, Nie Rongzhen, and Bo Yibo were assigned to a "three persons" group to oversee China's nuclear weapons development program.

=== Economic management ===
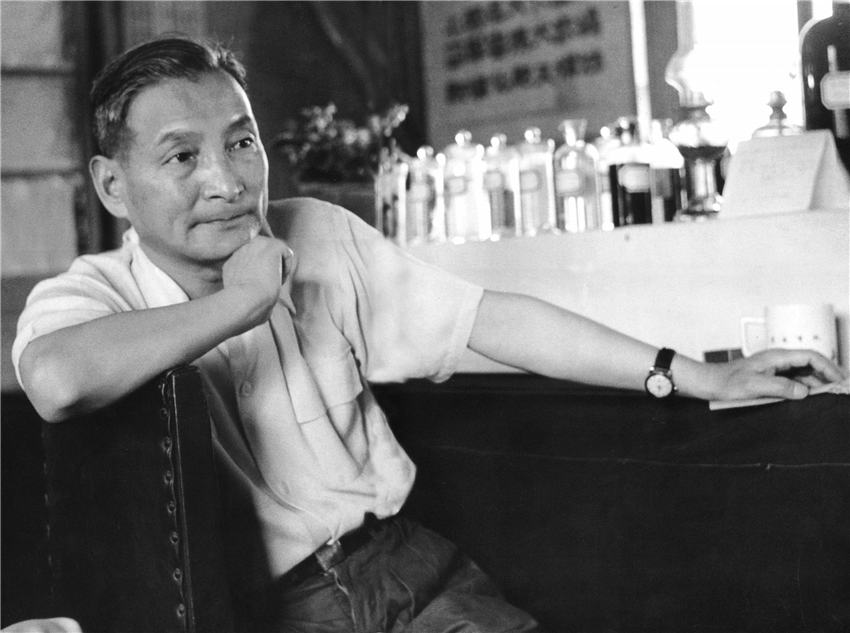
Chen Yun on June 8, 1958, in Beijing listening to a report on the development of the oil industry

In the 1950s, Chen was the CCP's leading economic planner.

During the 1950s and 1960s, Chen was a proponent of more market-oriented economic measures. Looking back, Chen would later believe that it was Mao's errors that most kept China from achieving its Five-Year Plans. In 1956, when the 8th National Congress of Chinese Communist Party was held, Chen was elected as vice chairman of the Central Committee. Around that time, both Mao and Chen had come to believe that the economic system, modeled on that of the Soviet Union, was overly centralized, but had different ideas about what to do about it. Chen believed that markets should have a larger economic role but remain subject to a state-controlled plan. Chen used the metaphor of a caged bird to describe the socialist economy. If the cage was too small, the bird would not survive. If the cage was left open, the bird would fly away.

In June 1958, Mao changed the party and government structure by establishing groups in charge of finance, legal matters, foreign affairs, science, and culture and education which bypassed the State Council. Chen was made the head of the finance group.

Mao sought to devolve powers to provincial and local authorities, which were in practice Party committees rather than state technocrats, and to use mass mobilization rather than either a detailed central planning or the market to promote economic growth, leading to Chen being sidelined within the party's economic apparatus. Mao's program prevailed, and these policies converged with Mao's disregard for supply-demand realities and unchecked, falsified yield data that led to the ultimately disastrous Great Leap Forward and a famine that killed millions. By early 1959, the economy was already showing signs of strain. In January of that year, Chen Yun published an article calling for increased Soviet aid. In March, he published a subdued but general critique of the Leap, especially its reliance on mass movement. Economic growth, he asserted, was not simply a matter of speed. It required attention to safe working conditions and quality engineering. It depended on technical skill, not just political awareness.

Chen began to fell out of favor with Mao. In the summer of 1959, the Party convened a meeting at the resort town of Lushan to review the policies of the Great Leap Forward. The Minister of Defense, Marshal Peng Dehuai, attacked the radicalism of the movement, and Mao took this, or affected to take it, as a personal attack on himself and his authority. Mao responded with a vicious personal attack on Peng. Peng lost his military positions and the Party undertook a general purge of what Mao termed right opportunism. Further reform of the Leap's policies were now out of the question. China continued on its set course for another year or more, and by the end of 1960 had fallen deep into famine.

Chen Yun was certainly in sympathy with Peng Dehuai's criticism of the Leap and joined forces with Zhou Enlai and Deng Xiaoping to manage the economy in the post-Great Leap Forward period, which required deft handling of Chairman Mao's sensitivity to criticism.

Chen retained his positions as Party vice chairman and member of the Politburo and continued to express his opinions behind the scenes. In 1961, he conducted investigations of the rural areas around Shanghai. According to a Cultural Revolution attack on him by the radical group within the finance system, he reported the peasants as saying: "In the days of Chiang Kai-shek we had rice to eat. In the glorious era of Chairman Mao, we have only gruel." According to his obituary, Chen was one of the main designers of the economic policies of the 1961-1962 "capitalist road" era, when China's economic policy stressed material incentives and sought to encourage economic growth in preference to pursuing ideological goals. This approach is often referred to as Chen's "bird-cage" theory of post-Great Leap economic recovery, where the bird represents the free market and the cage represents a central plan. Chen proposed that a balance should be found between "setting the bird free" and choking the bird with a central plan that was too restrictive; this theory would later become a focal point of criticism against Chen during the Cultural Revolution. His only public appearance during this time was a photograph of him published on the front page of the People's Daily and other major newspapers on May 1, 1962, showing Chen shaking hands with Chairman Mao, while Liu Shaoqi, Zhou Enlai, Zhu De, and Deng Xiaoping (the entire inner core of leadership of that time, with the exception of Lin Biao) look on. There was no caption or any other explanation.

Chen contributed to the early 1960s economic adjustment by promoting the "adjustment, consolidation, enrichment, and improvement" policy, which opposed adventurism, emphasized comprehensive balance and proportional development and aided in restoring the economy while mitigating further losses. He convened with Liu Shaoqi and Deng Xiaoping to dismantle extreme collectivization and restructured communes by devolving authority to production brigades and teams, reinstating material incentives through household sideline production and prioritizing agricultural recovery over ideological fervor.

=== Cultural Revolution ===
During the Cultural Revolution, Chen was politically sidelined. Chen was denounced in Red Guard publications but not in the official press. He was re-elected to the Central Committee in the Ninth Party Congress in April 1969 but not to the Politburo. He no longer held any functional positions. Later that year he was "evacuated" from Beijing, as were many other inactive or disgraced first-generation leaders, as part of a supposed plan preparing against the eventuality of an invasion by the Soviet Union with whom China had a serious geopolitical and ideological split. Chen was exiled to work in a factory in Nanchang in Jiangxi province, where he stayed for three years. In January 1975, he was elected to the Standing Committee of China's legislature, the National People's Congress.

== Career during the reform period ==
Following the death of Mao in September 1976 and the coup d'état against the radical Gang of Four a month later, Chen became increasingly active in the country's political life. He and General Wang Zhen petitioned Party chairman Hua Guofeng to rehabilitate Deng Xiaoping at the March 1977 CCP CC Work Conference, but were turned down. After Deng was rehabilitated later that year, Chen led the attack on the Maoist era at the November–December 1978 CCP CC Work Conference, raising the sensitive "six issues": the purges of Bo Yibo, Tao Zhu, Wang Heshou and Peng Dehuai; the 1976 Tiananmen Incident; and, Kang Sheng's errors. Chen raised the six issues in order to undermine Hua and his leftist supporters. Chen had a significant impact in marginalizing Hua and establishing Deng as China's new leader. Chen laid the basis for Deng's reform and opening up program.

In July 1979, Chen Yun was named head (and Li Xiannian deputy head) of the new national Economic and Financial Commission staffed with his own allies and conservative economic planners. In April and July of that year he made further provocative statements in internal Party meetings, although their authenticity was denied (in an equivocal manner) by official spokesmen. In these Chen deplored China's lack of economic progress and the people's loss of confidence in the Party. In April he criticized the luxurious life of Party leaders (including himself), and said if he had known in the period before the liberation what the past ten-some years would be like (that is, the Cultural Revolution period), he would have defected to Chiang Kai-shek. He deplored Mao's dictatorial ways and implied, although not very strongly, that the Party should take a milder line against dissidents. If "Lin Biao and the Gang of Four; that is, the radical leftists" had been able to assure the people food and clothing, he said, they would not have been so easy to overthrow.

In July, Chen developed these themes in another exposition (which also included some sarcastic observations on the late chairman's taste in literature). Chen said: "We say the old dynasties and the KMT 'ruled' the country, but talk instead of the 'leadership' of the Communist Party. But the Party is in fact a ruling party, and if it wishes to keep its position it must also keep the support of the people. It should not float above the masses but should live among them as their servants. Both the welfare of the people and the Party's ruling position require that the Party shrink the distance between itself and the people."

The old dynasties, Chen said, knew the value of a policy of yielding or retreating from untenable positions. The Party has to be able to step back from its past practices: in economy, culture, education, science, and ideology. Without compromising the basic principle of socialism, Chen believed that the Party must accommodate, for the time being, co-existence with aspects of capitalism. But all of this, Chen added, must be done carefully: otherwise China would be in danger of abandoning socialism and restoring capitalism. These pronouncements presaged the major reorientation of Chinese communism in the reform movement.

=== Role in the reform and opening up ===
Though Deng Xiaoping is credited as the architect of modern China's reform and opening up, Chen Yun contributed much to the strategy adopted by Deng, and Chen was more directly involved in the details of its planning and construction. A key feature of the reform was to use the market to allocate resources, within the scope of an overall plan. The reforms of the early 1980s were, in effect, the implementation, finally, of the program Chen had outlined in the mid-1950s. Chen called this the "birdcage economy". According to Chen, "the cage is the plan, and it may be large or small. But within the cage the bird [the economy] is free to fly as he wishes." Ultimately, Chen's view was that economic planning was most important. According to Chen in 1981, "[T]he relationship between the planned economy and market regulation is the relationship between the main and subordinate aspects. The planned economy plays a major role, and the market regulation is subordinate to the planned economy."

In 1981 a rival "Financial and Economic Leading Group" was established under Zhao Ziyang and staffed by a balanced mix of economic planners. In 1982 Chen Yun, who was 77 years old, stepped down from the Politburo and Central Committee and served as chairman of the new Central Advisory Commission, an institution set up to provide a place for leadership of the founding generation to remain involved in public affairs.

During the 1980s, Chen was very much involved in policy discussions. In the beginning and as one of the major architects for the reform and opening up, he supported Deng and the liberal market reforms that had been so successful in agriculture to urban areas and the industrial sector. Moreover, he still posited for the state to retain an active role in market development and planning, a policy that would influence future generations of leadership, including Jiang Zemin, Hu Jintao, and Xi Jinping. He played an active role in the "Anti-Spiritual Pollution Campaign" organised in late 1983, to help safeguard China's political status quo and domestic stability.

Chen Yun was widely admired and respected for striking a balance between excessive laissez faire capitalism and retaining state leadership in guiding China's market economy. Deng and Chen's reforms and foresight helped make generations of Chinese become richer since the days of Mao's Cultural Revolution, as well as propel China into becoming one of the top economies in the world (number one by PPP and number two by nominal GDP).

=== Late opponent of reform ===
Differing from Deng's focus on growth, Chen emphasized achieving several "balances" in the economy, including balances between revenue and spending, between issuing and repaying loans, and between supply and demand.

Chen was not, in principle, opposed to the scope of Deng's reforms; China's economic policy had effectively frozen consumer prices for decades, to the point that prices in China no longer had much relationship to the relative value of resources, goods, or services. Chen objected to the way in which the urban reforms were carried out. The immediate consequence of Deng's price reforms was a sudden and massive inflation, unprecedented in the experience of the younger generation and particularly frightening to older folks who could still remember the rampant inflation in the last years of the Nationalist regime. The increasing circulation of money in the economy, together with a hybrid system in which those in official positions or with official connections were particularly well-placed to take advantage of the new opportunities to make a profit, encouraged official corruption. Chen Yun also fought against corruption and harshly cracked down on corrupt officials.

The government's first response to inflation was to issue bonuses to workers in state-owned enterprises, to help make up for the price increases. Chen Yun argued that, if there were to be such bonuses, they should be gauged to increased productivity. In practice, the bonuses were universal throughout the state sector and had the same economic effect as if the government had simply printed more money. Because Chinese farmers were not eligible for bonuses since they were not technically state employees, China's agricultural sector, which had prospered in the first stage of the reform, was especially damaged by inflation.

Chen's theory had been that the market should supplement the plan. In the context of radical Maoism this made him seem like a social democratic proponent of market socialism. It turned out, however, that Chen meant exactly what he had said. He was much less enthusiastic about the market than Deng and his supporters. Although in his "secret" pronouncements of 1979 Chen had shown an unusual personal disdain for Mao, he also indicated he shared the late chairman's worries that China would abandon socialism and revert back to capitalism. Chen was skeptical regarding the establishment of special economic zones (SEZ), viewing them as a non-socialist experiment and vulnerable to foreign influences. Chen viewed the development of a socialist market economy as unscientific and unrealistic.

During the 1980s, Chen emerged as the main figure among the more hard-line opponents of reform. He supported the vigorous campaign in the early 1980s against the "three kinds of people", a general purge of all those who had been identified with radical factions during the Cultural Revolution. He made common cause with conservatives among other Party elders, that emphasized the primacy of centralized planning in regulating key economic sectors, arguing that market mechanisms alone risked destabilizing socialism by prioritizing profit over state-directed balance and cautioned against over-reliance on a "commodity economy". During the reform era, Chen refused to meet with foreigners and never visited the new SEZs. In a memorial tribute to Li Xiannian, an old colleague from the economic system (and, like Chen, one of the few real proletarians among the first generation of Party leaders), Chen stated that he was not necessarily opposed to everything about the SEZs. While Chen became the moral leader of the conservative opposition to Deng Xiaoping, he did not directly challenge Deng's personal primacy as head of regime, but sought instead to undermine his protégé General Secretary Hu Yaobang, in which he successfully had Hu ousted from his position following the 1986 Chinese student demonstrations, after Hu failed to take a decisive position against the protests.

Although Zhao Ziyang's promotion of political and economic reform made Zhao one of Chen's main political rivals, Chen was one of the Party elders active in the 1980s who Zhao respected most. In Zhao's autobiography, Chen was one of the few elders who Zhao referred to regularly as a "comrade". Before implementing new policies, Zhao made a habit of visiting Chen, in order to solicit Chen's advice and attempt to gain Chen's approval. In the event that Zhao failed to gain Chen's approval, Zhao would then normally attempt to fall back on the favor of Deng Xiaoping in order to promote reforms. Despite Zhao's overtures to Chen, Chen was skeptical towards Zhao, and instead supported ideologue Deng Liqun, who as head of the Propaganda Department had spearheaded ideological campaigns to target and purge liberal intellectuals, as a conservative alternative to Deng's choice of Zhao as the new General Secretary replacing Hu.

=== Tiananmen Square protests ===
In 1989, Chen, alongside Deng Xiaoping, Li Peng, and others, was among the Party elders responsible for making the key decisions concerning the student-led Tiananmen Square protests. While initially seemingly reluctant about the use of lethal military force, Chen ultimately backed the People's Liberation Army crackdown on the reformist protests to preserve the Party's authority. Chen agreed that Zhao Ziyang should be replaced as the formal head of the Party, and he endorsed Li Xiannian's nomination of Jiang Zemin as the new Party General Secretary.

Chen, a hardliner, attributed the unrest not merely to student idealism but to an ideological vacuum resulting from diminished emphasis on socialist principles and class struggle that fostered "bourgeois liberalization" and elite-instigated chaos led by Zhao that threatened the party's foundational control and the stability enabling prior economic gains.

== Retirement and death ==
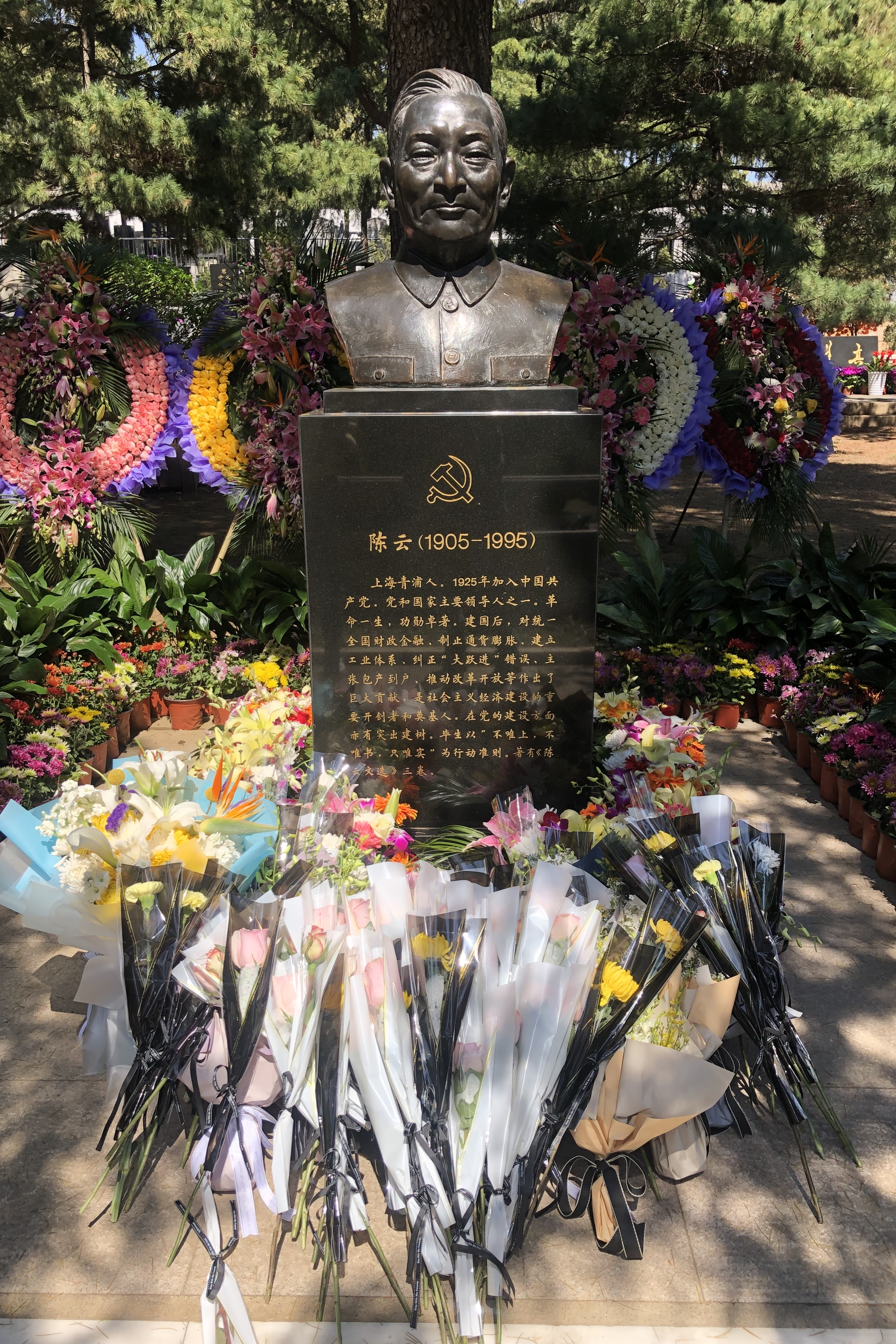
Chen Yun's cinerarium in Babaoshan Revolutionary Cemetery on the fifth anniversary of his death.

After the 13th Party Congress in November 1987, Chen ended his 56 year–long political career as a member of the CCP Central Committee, also leaving the Politburo Standing Committee, along with both Deng Xiaoping and Li Xiannian. However, Chen succeeded Deng as the Chairman of the Central Advisory Committee. During Chen's term, the Central Advisory Committee has become a leading force of the conservative faction within the Chinese Communist Party.

After the Tiananmen Square incident in June 1989, Chen Yun's influence grew within the party due to the removal of reformists Zhao Ziyang and Hu Qili from the Politburo Standing Committee. Chen's supporters in the Politburo delayed wholesale privatization by embedding veto points in central planning bodies, ensuring state enterprises retained over 70% of industrial output into the 1990s and blocking rapid asset sales. However, after Deng Xiaoping's southern tour in early 1992 and his rallying of provincial leaders to deepen reforms, Chen Yun and the conservative faction's influence within the party waned significantly.

In October 1992 at the age of 87, Chen retired from politics along with other party elders at the 14th Party Congress when the Central Advisory Committee was also abolished. Many main figures of the conservative faction led by Chen such as Yao Yilin, Song Ping, and Deng Liqun also retired after 14th Party Congress.

Chen's health drastically deteriorated in 1994. He was hospitalized on 25 May 1994, due to pneumonia, and remained in hospital until his death. Chen died on 12 April 1995, at the age of 89. He was cremated at Babaoshan Revolutionary Cemetery. His official obituary described him as "a great proletarian revolutionary and statesman" and an "outstanding Marxist".

== Legacy ==
Had Mao died in 1956, his achievements would have been immortal. Had he died in 1966, he would still have been a great man but flawed. But he died in 1976. Alas, what can one say?

— Chen Yun

Chen Yun was known for his foundational role in spearheading the reform and opening up alongside Deng Xiaoping. During Deng's term, Chen Yun was the second most powerful person in China. Chen was praised for implementing many of the reforms that made the new generation of Chinese richer, but was also admired for striking a balance between too much laissez-faire economics and retaining state control over key areas of the market. He was liberal in the beginning, but later more cautious and conservative, especially in his last years. He was widely admired by the Chinese populace, known for his wide-sweeping economic strategic planning, morality and incorruptibility.

Chen's political perspective is generally viewed as reformist until about 1980, but conservative after about 1984. Chen Yun remains one of China's most powerful and influential leaders, especially in the PRC's first 50 years, as he was a central decision-maker for the CCP, serving on the Central Committee and Politburo for over 40 years.

In the beginning, Chen supported Deng, carried out and implemented many of the influential reforms that made a generation of Chinese richer. But later, Chen realized that the state still needed an active iron hand involvement in the market to prevent the private sector from becoming untamable. Chen's criticism of Deng's later economic reforms was widely influential within the Communist Party and was reflected in the policies of China's leaders after Deng. Chen's theories supported the efforts of Jiang Zemin and Hu Jintao to use state power to provide boundaries for the operation of the market, and to mediate the damage that capitalism can do to those who find it difficult to benefit from the free market. Chen's notion of the CCP as a "ruling party" is central to the redefinition of the role of the Party in Jiang Zemin's Three Represents. In 2005, on the occasion of the hundredth anniversary of Chen's birth, the Party press published, over the course of several weeks, the proceedings of a symposium discussing Chen's contributions to CCP history, theory and practice.

Although Chen opposed the Mao regime and opposed some of Deng's later policies, Chen was still widely respected as one of the leading elders of the Chinese Communist Party. During the Cultural Revolution, Chen was able to escape political persecution, especially in Mao's time, as he carefully avoided challenging the top leadership too much. Whatever the wisdom of his substantive positions, Chen consistently appeared to act on principle rather than for personal advantage, and retained his influence in the party throughout the Mao and Deng eras.

In cultural affairs, Chen promoted and protected pingtan, a form of ballad singing which was culturally important in the lower Yangzi area and which was sometimes politically criticized as being "feudal". As his political prominence increased after Mao's death, Chen published 40 articles on ballad singing in which he commented on specific ballads and urged Chinese to study the art form, publish more old texts about it, and train a new generation of ballad singers.

In June 2025, CCP General Secretary Xi Jinping held a meeting to commemorate the 120th anniversary of Chen Yun's birth. He called Chen a "great proletarian revolutionary and statesman", saying he was "one of the founding figures of the country's socialist economy" and a "key member" of the first and second generation of leaders. Xi continued by saying Chen had "firm ideals and beliefs, strong party principles, pragmatic style" and a "diligent learning spirit", which he described as "noble qualities of communists" to be studied by all CCP members. Xi said that "When the party's cause encountered difficulties, [Chen] always kept a cool mind, and offered unique insights and effective solutions to problems based on thorough considerations". He called on CCP members to learn from Chen's experiences regarding China's first five-year plan, fighting corruption and to "seek truth from facts".

Chen's eldest son, Chen Yuan, is the founding Governor of the China Development Bank and the former Vice Chairman of the National Committee of the Chinese People's Political Consultative Conference.

== Works ==
- Chen Yun (2001). Selected Works of Chen Yun: 1926–1949. Vol. I (2nd ed.). Beijing: Foreign Languages Press. ISBN 7-119-02181-8.
- — (1997). Selected Works of Chen Yun: 1949–1956. Vol. II (1st ed.). Beijing: Foreign Languages Press. ISBN 7-119-01691-1.
- — (1999). Selected Works of Chen Yun: 1956–1994. Vol. III (1st ed.). Beijing: Foreign Languages Press. ISBN 7-119-01720-9.

== Notes ==
Party political offices
Preceded by None	Vice Chairman of the Chinese Communist Party; Served alongside: Lin Biao, Zhou Enlai, Liu Shaoqi, Zhu De; 1956–1969	Succeeded by Lin Biao
Preceded by Zhou Enlai, Li Xiannian, Kang Sheng, Li Desheng, Wang Hongwen, Ye Jianying	Vice Chairman of the Chinese Communist Party; Served alongside: Li Xiannian, Ye Jianying, Wang Dongxing, Deng Xiaoping, Hua Guofeng, Zhao Ziyang; 1978–1982	Succeeded by None
Preceded by None	First Secretary of the Central Commission for Discipline Inspection; 1978–1987	Succeeded by Qiao Shi (secretary)
Preceded by Deng Xiaoping	Chairman of the CCP Central Advisory Commission; 1987–1992	Succeeded by None
Political offices
Preceded by None	First-ranking Vice Premier of the People's Republic of China; 1954–1965	Succeeded by Lin Biao
