= Secretariat of the Chinese Communist Party =

Body serving the Politburo of the CCP and its Standing Committee

Secretariat of the Central Committee of the Chinese Communist Party 中国共产党中央书记处

Information
- General Secretary: Xi Jinping
- Members: Cai Qi; Shi Taifeng; Li Ganjie; Li Shulei; Chen Wenqing; Liu Jinguo; Wang Xiaohong
- Elected by: Central Committee
- Responsible to: Politburo and its Standing Committee
- Seats: 7

Meeting place
- Qinzheng Hall, Zhongnanhai; Beijing, China

Central Secretariat of the Chinese Communist Party
- Simplified Chinese: 中国共产党中央书记处
- Traditional Chinese: 中國共產黨中央書記處
- Literal meaning: China Communist Party Central Secretariat
Transcriptions
Standard Mandarin
- Hanyu Pinyin: Zhōngguó Gòngchǎndǎng Zhōngyāng Shūjìchù

Alternative Chinese name
- Simplified Chinese: 书记处
- Traditional Chinese: 書記處
- Literal meaning: Secretariat
Transcriptions
Standard Mandarin
- Hanyu Pinyin: Shūjìchù

The Secretariat, officially the Secretariat of the Central Committee of the Communist Party of China, is a body serving the Chinese Communist Party (CCP)'s Politburo and Standing Committee. The secretariat is mainly responsible for carrying out routine operations of the Politburo and coordinating organizations and stakeholders to achieve tasks set out by the Politburo. It is empowered by the Politburo to make routine day-to-day decisions on issues of concern in accordance with the decisions of the Politburo, but it must consult the Politburo on substantive matters.

The secretariat was established in January 1934. It is nominally headed by the CCP general secretary, though the position of head of the secretariat was not always the same as the top party leader. Members of the secretariat (Shujichu Shuji) are considered some of the most important political positions in the CCP and contemporary China, more generally. Each secretariat member is generally in charge of one of the major party departments directly under the jurisdiction of the Central Committee. By protocol, its members are ranked above the vice chairmen of the National People's Congress as well as State Councilors. The general secretary presides over the secretariat's work.

== History ==
The Secretariat of the Central Committee was formed on 15–18 January 1934 at the 5th Plenary Session of the 6th Central Committee, which was held in Shanghai. On 20 March 1943, the Politburo, in a joint decision, decreed that the secretariat will be responsible for carrying out the work of the Politburo according to the general policy framework determined by the Politburo and that it is vested with the power to make decisions within this general framework.

A formal head of the secretariat for managing its affairs has existed several times. Ren Bishi was elected Secretary-General of the Chinese Communist Party by the 6th Poliburo in August 1941. It existed until a meeting of the 7th Politburo on 20 March 1943, which abolished the post and replaced it with the new office of Chairman of the Secretariat, with Mao Zedong being elected to the post. The 1st Plenary Session of the 7th Central Committee elected Ren Bishi as Secretary-General of the Central Committee and Li Fuchun as Deputy Secretary-General of the Central Committee on 11 June 1945. It is unclear who took over Ren Bishi's office upon his death on 27 October 1950.

On 27 April 1954, the 8th Politburo decided to establish the offices of Secretary-General of the Central Committee and Deputy Secretary-General of the Central Committee. Deng Xiaoping was elected as secretary-general and Li Fuchun, Yang Shangkun, Tan Zhenlin, Ma Mingfang, Song Renqiong, Liu Lantao, Lin Feng, Li Xuefeng and Hu Qiaomu as deputy secretaries-general. This institution was not called Secretariat, but rather the "Conference of the Secretary-General". The 8th National Congress in 1956 abolished it and formally replaced it with the Secretariat. The 1st Plenary Session of the 8th Central Committee opted to re-elect Deng Xiaoping as secretary-general with no deputy on 28 September 1956.

In May 1966, the 8th Politburo convened to criticize the mistakes of leading cadres, including that of Deng Xiaoping. He was replaced, and the office of the secretary-general was abolished, and Tao Zhu was elected as Standing Secretary. It is unclear when this office stopped functioning, and the Secretariat more generally, but the 9th National Congress in 1969 decided to abolish these institutions.

The office was re-established in 1978 when Chen Yun, a member of the 11th Politburo Standing Committee, proposed to the 11th Politburo to re-establish both the Secretariat and the offices of secretary-general and deputy secretary-general. That politburo meeting re-established elected Hu Yaobang as secretary-general and Hu Qiaomu and Yao Yilin as deputy secretaries-general, but did not re-establish the Secretariat. This occurred at the 5th Plenary Session of the 11th Central Committee on 23–29 February 1980, but this plenum also decided to abolish the offices of deputy secretary-general. The position was abolished alongside the office of Chairman of the Chinese Communist Party at the 12th National Congress in 1982, and replaced with the office of General Secretary of the Chinese Communist Party.

== Functions ==
The Secretariat is the working body of the CCP Politburo and Politburo Standing Committee, and is in charge of implementing their decisions. It meets daily, and the body is responsible for coordinating major events and meetings within the country, drafting of important documents, and arranging the domestic and foreign travel of top leaders. The Secretariat additionally organizes major events and supervises the departments directly under the CCP Central Committee: the CCP General Office, the Organization Department, the Publicity Department, the International Department, the United Front Work Department, the Social Work Department, and the Central Political and Legal Affairs Commission.

The CCP General Secretary presides over the work of the Secretariat. The members of the Secretariat are nominated by the Politburo Standing Committee and approved during a plenary session of the CCP Central Committee. The members of the Secretariat are tasked with coordinating the dissemination and implementation of Politburo and PSC decisions. They also assist in reviewing political reports, creating policy plans and help in personnel decisions. A Politburo meeting in October 2017 after the first plenary session of the 19th CCP Central Committee stipulated that the Secretariat must report its work to the Politburo and its Standing Committee every year.

=== Leader of the Secretariat ===
According to the "Regulation on the Work of the Central Committee of the Chinese Communist Party", the general secretary leads the Secretariat's work. The Secretariat works in accordance with the instructions of the general secretary, the Politburo and the Politburo Standing Committee. This has been the case since the re-establishment of the office of Central Committee general secretary on 29 February 1980. A similar office existed between 1956 and 1966 and again from 1966 to 1967 under the name "Standing Secretary of the Central Secretariat".

== See also ==
- General Office of the Chinese Communist Party
- Grand Secretariat (Imperial court of China)
