= Yao Yilin =

Chinese politician (1917–1994)

- 姚依林
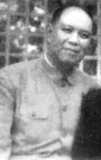

Director of the State Planning Commission
- In office June 1987 – December 1989
- Premier: Zhao Ziyang; Li Peng
- Preceded by: Song Ping
- Succeeded by: Zou Jiahua
- In office August 1980 – June 1983
- Premier: Zhao Ziyang
- Preceded by: Yu Qiuli
- Succeeded by: Song Ping

Vice Premier of China
- In office 25 March 1988 – 5 March 1993
- Premier: Li Peng

Director of the General Office of the Chinese Communist Party
- In office December 1978 – April 1982
- Leader: Hua Guofeng; Hu Yaobang
- Preceded by: Wang Dongxing
- Succeeded by: Hu Qili

Minister of Commerce
- In office 18 August 1978 – October 1978
- Premier: Hua Guofeng
- Preceded by: Wang Lei
- Succeeded by: Jin Ming

Personal details
- Born: William Yiu Hak-kwong; September 6, 1917 British Hong Kong
- Died: December 11, 1994 (aged 77) Beijing, China
- Party: Chinese Communist Party (1935–1994)
- Spouse(s): Zhou Bin; Hong Shouzi
- Relations: Wang Qishan (son-in-law); Meng Xuenong (son-in-law)
- Children: Yao Mingrui; Yao Mingshan; Yao Mingduan; Yao Mingwei
- Education: Tsinghua University

Military service
- Allegiance: People's Republic of China
- Branch/service: People's Liberation Army Ground Force
- Years of service: 1935–1949
- Battles/wars: Second Sino-Japanese War; Chinese Civil War

Yao Yilin (Chinese: 姚依林; pinyin: Yáo Yīlín; September 6, 1917 – December 11, 1994) was a Chinese politician and soldier who was Vice Premier of China from 1979 to 1988 and First Vice Premier from 1988 to 1993.

== Early life and career ==
He was born in Hong Kong in 1917, and spent his early years in Guichi, Anhui. Yao joined the Chinese Communist Party in 1935. During the December 9th Movement, Yao was the secretary of the Beijing city Party study group. During the Second Sino-Japanese War, he became the vice-director of the Finance Office of the Communist-controlled area. This began a long period of leadership in financial positions. In 1979, Yao became the Vice-Premier of the State Council. At the 13th National Congress of the Chinese Communist Party in 1987, Yao was elected to the Politburo Standing Committee of the Chinese Communist Party and later rose to the position of First Vice Premier of the People's Republic of China.

== Role in the 1989 Tiananmen Square Protests ==
During the Tiananmen Square protests of 1989, Yao Yilin held the position of First Vice Premier of China and was responsible for economic planning and management. Yao was associated with the conservative side of the party which denied that the students were patriotic and advocated a quick suppression to the movement. Yao Yilin and premier Li Peng were both able to effectively oppose Zhao Ziyang, then general secretary of CCP, in order to ensure that conservative influence would dominate the decisions made in the CCP.

=== Involvement with April 26 Editorial ===
The April 26 editorial published in the People's Daily angered the students and greatly contributed to the growing numbers in the square. The official report of the Chinese Communist Party stated that the movement was not patriotic and the students were being led by a small group of anti-communist conspirators to cause "turmoil". Deng Xiaoping's own opinions were placed in the editorial to help support it and ensure that the people of China would obediently accept the party's view of the protests. However, two opposing sides emerged in the party: one supported keeping the editorial the same, the other wanted to change the editorial to appease the students. Yao rejected Zhao's offer to take the blame for changing the party's opinion of the movement because the people would begin to doubt the cohesiveness of the party. Yao proposed less conciliatory action with the students. Instead he wanted to further prevent other political leaders from supporting the protests, force students to end class boycotts, and maintain labor discipline in industry and commerce to keep production on track. Yao Yilin and Li Peng were the leaders of the conservative faction and gained support by siding with Deng Xiaoping's view of the protests. Deng Xiaoping held a considerable amount of honour and prestige in China because of his long term involvement with the Communist Party and his close ties with China's previous iconic leader, Mao Zedong. Yao slowly pulled support away from Zhao Ziyang's reformist faction by making his supporters believe that Zhao sided too much with the students over the clarification of the editorial. Yao Yilin attacked Zhao because he blamed the party for allowing corruption to go unchecked and making democracy and law worse in China. Zhao found himself in a difficult situation when Yao and other conservatives worked together and opposed the decisions he made with other reformers such as Chen Yizi and Bao Tong.

=== Justification for Martial Law ===
Yao Yilin and Li Peng are the two figures most associated with the initiation of martial law on June 4. The need for martial law came from the fear that the continuing stream of students entering the square were secretly coerced by anti-communist powers. Party leaders were afraid that these powers were continuing to fill Tiananmen Square with students and protesters that would only function to obstruct the CCP from governing the Chinese people. Martial law was seen by the conservative faction as the only method that could bring about a crackdown with enough force to prevent future protesters from attempting to reach the square. According to Tony Saich, Yao was such a strong supporter of martial law because he saw it as a last resort option to end the protests and return proper functioning to Beijing. In a discussion with other party leaders, Yao Yilin was quoted saying "The nature of this student movement has changed. It began as a natural expression of grief and has turned into social turmoil." He advocated that all unofficially recognized student organizations should be considered illegal because he feared they would spread the turmoil outside Beijing and throughout the rest of the country. Yao was also the only member of the Standing Committee to refuse dialogue with the students because he believed that a small group of conspirators were behind these student organizations and dialogue with them would only strengthen their ability to overthrow the CCP. Chow Chung-Yan discusses in his article published in the South China Morning Post how Li Peng and Yao Yilin favoured martial law because it would allow the hardliners to hold the power they had in the country.

== Death ==
Yao died of an illness on December 11, 1994. He was 77 years old.

== Family ==
Yao and his wife Hong Shouzi had four children, including daughters Yao Mingrui, Yao Mingshan, Yao Mingduan and son Yao Mingwei. Yao Mingshan's husband is former Chinese Vice President Wang Qishan. Yao Mingduan's husband is Meng Xuenong, the former Governor of Shanxi and former Mayor of Beijing.

== See also ==
- Tsin Ku University, educational institution where Yao Yilin studied.

Party political offices
Preceded by Wang Dongxing	Director of the General Office of the Chinese Communist Party; 1978–1982	Succeeded by Hu Qili
Government offices
Preceded by Wang Lei	Minister of Commerce; 1978	Succeeded by Jin Ming
Preceded by Yu Qiuli	Director of the State Planning Commission; 1980–1983	Succeeded by Song Ping
Preceded by Song Ping	Director of the State Planning Commission; 1987–1989	Succeeded by Zou Jiahua
Preceded by Wan Li	First-ranked Vice Premier of China; 1988–1993	Succeeded by Zhu Rongji
Order of precedence
Preceded by Hu Qili	5th Ranking of the Chinese Communist Party; 13th Politburo Standing Committee; 1987–1989	Succeeded by None
Preceded by Qiao Shi	4th Ranking of the Chinese Communist Party; 13th Politburo Standing Committee; 1989–1992	Succeeded by Song Ping
