= Secretary of the Central Commission for Discipline Inspection =

Head of a Chinese Communist Party commission

Secretary of the Central Commission for Discipline Inspection of the Chinese Communist Party
- Emblem of the Chinese Communist Party

- Flag of the Chinese Communist Party

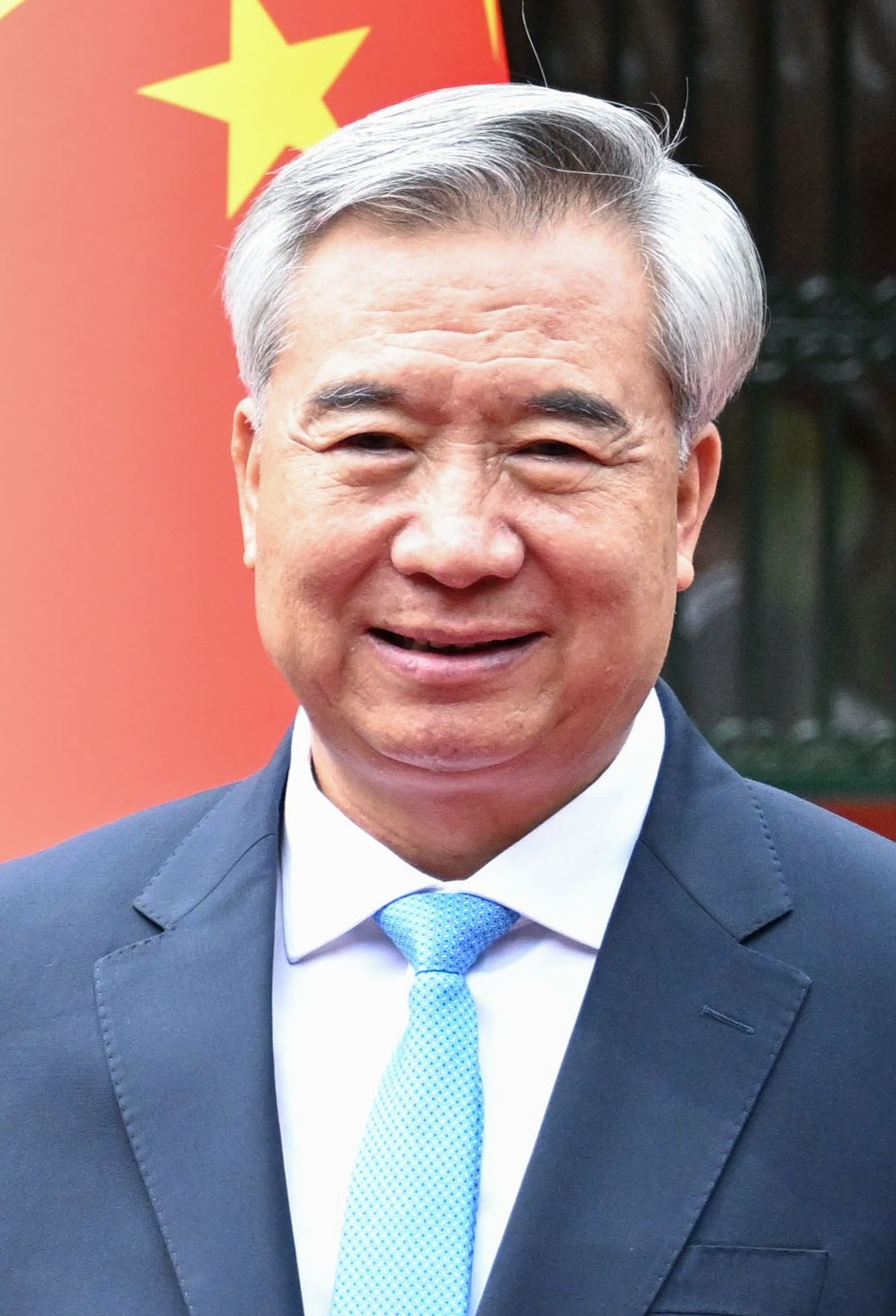
- Incumbent; Li Xi since 23 October 2022
- Central Commission for Discipline Inspection
- Status: Deputy national-level official
- Residence: Zhongnanhai
- Seat: Beijing
- Appointer: Plenary session of the Central Commission for Discipline Inspection
- Term length: Five years
- Inaugural holder: Wang Hebo
- Formation: 9 May 1927; 99 years ago

Secretary of the Central Commission for Discipline Inspection
- Simplified Chinese: 中国共产党中央纪律检查委员会书记
- Literal meaning: Secretary of the Central Commission for Discipline Inspection of the Chinese Communist Party
Transcriptions

The secretary of the Central Commission for Discipline Inspection (CCDI) is the head of the Central Commission for Discipline Inspection. The office is a leading political position, and the officeholder has been a member of the Politburo Standing Committee, the highest decision-making body of the Chinese Communist Party, since 19 September 1997. The current secretary is Li Xi, who was elected by the 1st Plenary Session of the 20th Central Commission for Discipline Inspection on 23 October 2022 and approved by the 20th Central Committee on the same day. The role is roughly analogous to that of the chairman of the Central Control Commission in other communist countries.

An ad-hoc Central Control Committee was established by the 7th National Congress in 1945, but the 7th Central Committee never elected it.

== Titles ==
Leader titles of the Central Commission for Discipline Inspection of the Chinese Communist Party
Title	Existence	Established
Secretary of the Central Supervisory Commission	1927–1928	5th National Congress
Secretary of the Central Review Committee	1928–1934	6th National Congress
Secretary of the Central Party Affairs Commission	1934–1945	Decision of the 6th Politburo
Secretary of the Central Control Committee	1945–1949	7th National Congress
Secretary of the Central Commission for Discipline Inspection	1949–1955	Decision of the 7th Politburo
Secretary of the Central Supervisory Commission	1955–1969	1st National Conference
First Secretary of the Central Commission for Discipline Inspection	1978–1987	3rd Plenary Session of the 11th Central Committee
Secretary of the Central Commission for Discipline Inspection	1987 onwards	13th National Congress

== Officeholders ==
Secretary of the Central Commission for Discipline Inspection of the Chinese Communist Party
No.	Officeholder			Took office	Left office	Length of tenure	Term	Birth	PM	Death	Ref.
1		Wang Hebo	王荷波	9 May 1927	11 November 1927	186 days	5th (1927–1928)	1882	1922	1927	
2		Liu Shaoqi	刘少奇	18 July 1928	18 January 1934	5 years, 184 days	6th (1928–1945)	1898	1921	1969	
3		Li Weihan	李维汉	18 January 1934	11 June 1945	11 years, 144 days	6th (1928–1945)	1896	1921	1984	
4		Zhu De	朱德	9 November 1949	31 March 1955	5 years, 83 days	7th (1949–1956)	1886	1925	1976	
5		Dong Biwu	董必武	31 March 1955	24 April 1969	14 years, 24 days	7th–8th (1949–1969)	1886	1921	1975	
6		Chen Yun	陈云	22 December 1978	1 November 1987	8 years, 314 days	11th–12th (1978–1987)	1905	1924	1995	
7		Qiao Shi	乔石	1 November 1987	19 October 1992	4 years, 353 days	13th (1987–1992)	1924	1940	2015	
8		Wei Jianxing	尉健行	19 October 1992	15 November 2002	10 years, 27 days	14th–15th (1992–2002)	1931	1949	2015	
9		Wu Guanzheng	吴官正	15 November 2002	22 October 2007	4 years, 341 days	16th (2002–2007)	1938	1963	Alive	
10		He Guoqiang	贺国强	22 October 2007	15 November 2012	5 years, 24 days	17th (2007–2012)	1943	1966	Alive	
11		Wang Qishan	王岐山	15 November 2012	25 October 2017	4 years, 344 days	18th (2012–2017)	1948	1983	Alive	
12		Zhao Leji	赵乐际	25 October 2017	23 October 2022	4 years, 363 days	19th (2017–2022)	1957	1975	Alive	
13	Li Xi	Li Xi	李希	23 October 2022	Incumbent	3 years, 351 days	20th (2022–2027)	1956	1982	Alive	

== See also ==
- Deputy Secretary of the Central Commission for Discipline Inspection
- Secretary General of the Central Commission for Discipline Inspection
