= General Secretary of the Chinese Communist Party =

Leader of the Chinese Communist Party

General Secretary of the Central Committee of the Chinese Communist Party
- 中国共产党中央委员会总书记
- Emblem of the Chinese Communist Party

- Flag of the Chinese Communist Party

- Incumbent; Xi Jinping since 15 November 2012
- Central Committee of the Chinese Communist Party; Secretariat of the Chinese Communist Party
- Style: General Secretary (总书记) (informal); Comrade (同志) (formal)
- Type: Party and state leader; Paramount leader
- Status: National-level official (highest ranking official / political chief)
- Member of: Politburo Standing Committee
- Reports to: Central Committee
- Residence: Qinzheng Hall, Zhongnanhai
- Seat: Beijing
- Nominator: Central Committee
- Appointer: Central Committee
- Term length: Five years, renewable
- Constituting instrument: Party Constitution
- Precursor: Chairman (1943–1976)
- Formation: 23 July 1921; 105 years ago
- First holder: Chen Duxiu

General Secretary of the Central Committee of the Chinese Communist Party
- Simplified Chinese: 中国共产党中央委员会总书记
- Traditional Chinese: 中國共產黨中央委員會總書記
- Literal meaning: General Secretary of the Central Committee of the Chinese Communist Party
Transcriptions
Standard Mandarin
- Hanyu Pinyin: Zhōngguó Gòngchǎndǎng Zhōngyāng Wěiyuánhuì Zǒngshūjì

Commonly abbreviated as
- Simplified Chinese: 中共中央总书记
- Traditional Chinese: 中共中央總書記
Transcriptions
Standard Mandarin
- Hanyu Pinyin: Zhōnggòng Zhōngyāng Zǒngshūjì

Second alternative Chinese name
- Simplified Chinese: 总书记
- Traditional Chinese: 總書記
- Literal meaning: General Secretary
Transcriptions
Standard Mandarin
- Hanyu Pinyin: Zǒngshūjì

The general secretary of the Central Committee of the Chinese Communist Party is the leader of the Chinese Communist Party (CCP), the sole ruling party of the People's Republic of China (PRC). The general secretary leads the CCP Central Committee. Since 1989, the general secretary has been the country's paramount leader. The general secretary has also been the political chief position of China (above the president and premier) since 1982.

Following the establishment of the CCP at the 1st Party National Congress in 1921, Chen Duxiu served as the secretary of the Central Bureau. In 1922, he became the chairman of the Central Executive Committee. The position of general secretary of the Central Committee was established at the 4th Party National Congress in 1925, when Chen was elected as the first general secretary. After the 7th Party National Congress in 1945, the position was replaced by the chairman of the Central Committee, which was held by Mao Zedong until his death in 1976. The post was re-established at the 12th Party National Congress in 1982 and replaced the CCP chairman as the highest leadership position of the CCP; Hu Yaobang was the first general secretary. Although the general secretary was the highest office in the CCP, it only became the most powerful post after Deng Xiaoping's retirement in 1989. Since Jiang Zemin's leadership in the 1990s, the holder of the post has been, except for transitional periods, the president of China, making the holder the state representative, and the chairman of the Central Military Commission (CMC), the supreme commander of the People's Liberation Army (PLA). (Note: Xi Jinping was named general secretary of the CCP and took over the chairmanship of the Central Military Commission from Hu Jintao in November 2012.)

According to the CCP constitution, the general secretary is elected during a plenary session of the Central Committee. The term of the office is the same of that as the Central Committee, which is five years, and there is no limit to the number of consecutive terms. The general secretary serves as an ex officio member of the Politburo Standing Committee (PSC), China's top decision-making body. The general secretary is also the head of the Secretariat, and sets the agenda of Central Committee, Politburo and PSC meetings. Additionally, the general secretary sets the agenda of the decision-making and coordinating bodies of the CCP Central Committee. At the National Congress, the general secretary delivers the political report. Although the CCP constitution is vague on the powers of the general secretary, as the leader of the sole ruling party in the country, the position effectively grants the officeholder leadership and decision-making power in the party, the state, law, diplomacy, and ideology in China. As the leader of the world's largest economy by GDP purchasing power parity (PPP), the second largest economy by GDP nominal, the largest military in the world by personnel, a recognized nuclear weapons state, UN Security Council permanent member, and a superpower, the general secretary is considered to be one of the world's most powerful political figures.

The incumbent general secretary of the CCP Central Committee is Xi Jinping, who was elected at the first plenary session of the 18th CCP Central Committee in on 15 November 2012, and re-elected twice at the first plenary session of the 19th CCP Central Committee 25 October 2017 and the first plenary session of the 20th CCP Central Committee on 23 October 2022.

== History ==
Following the founding of the Chinese Communist Party (CCP) at its 1st National Congress in 1921, one of its original 13 delegates who attended in absentia, Chen Duxiu, held the title of secretary of the Central Bureau. In the 2nd National Congress in 1922, he became the chairman of the Central Executive Committee. From 11 to 22 January 1925, the 4th National Congress of the Chinese Communist Party issued 11 resolutions, including modifications to the CCP constitution, to encapsulate its experiences acquired during the First United Front. These changes included replacing the Chairman of the Central Executive Committee with General Secretary; Chen Duxiu was elected as General Secretary of the Central Committee and Director of the Central Organization Department. According to the CCP constitution at the time, the general secretary's responsibility was to oversee all party affairs nationwide. Between 1928 and 1943, Xiang Zhongfa, Wang Ming, Bo Gu, Zhang Wentian and others successively served as general secretaries. At a Politburo meeting in March 1943, the Central Committee was reorganized and the position of Chairman of the Central Secretariat was established. Mao Zedong was elected Chairman of the Politburo and Chairman of the Central Secretariat, thus establishing his unified leadership. On 19 June 1945, the 7th Central Committee held its first plenary session where Mao was elected Chairman of the Central Committee at the meeting, abolishing the post of general secretary.

On 1 September 1982, the CCP convened its 12th National Congress, during which it resolved to amend the CCP constitution to eliminate the position of Chairman of the Central Committee, retaining only the role of General Secretary of the Central Committee. It established that the responsibilities of the General Secretary would include convening meetings of the Politburo of the Central Committee and the Standing Committee of the Politburo, as well as presiding over the operations of the Central Committee Secretariat. The party's last chairman, Hu Yaobang, transferred to the post of General Secretary. Since its revival in 1982, the post of general secretary has been the highest office in the CCP, though it did not become the most powerful post until Deng Xiaoping's retirement in 1989. In the 1980s, Hu Yaobang and Zhao Ziyang served as general secretary. In 1989, Jiang Zemin became the general secretary and concurrently served as chairman of the Central Military Commission, restoring the leadership with the General Secretary as the core, and once again concentrating the power of the Party, government and military in one person. Since Jiang Zemin became general secretary, under China's one-party system, the main person in charge of the CCP Central Committee was generally the de facto highest leader of the country, and at the same time the highest-ranking leadership position in the country.

In 1993, starting with Jiang Zemin, the general secretary has traditionally also held the post of president. While the presidency is a ceremonial post, it is customary for the general secretary to assume the presidency to confirm his status as state representative. It has additionally been held together with the post of chairman of the Central Military Commission, making the holder the supreme commander of the People's Liberation Army. The system of holding the three posts simultaneously has officially been referred to as the "three-in-one" leadership system. Since Xi Jinping became general secretary in 2012, he has established several intra-party decision-making and coordinating bodies, such as the Central National Security Commission and the Central Leading Group for Comprehensively Deepening Reforms. The general secretary is the head of all these bodies, making the office's powers broader and more important. After the 19th CCP National Congress in 2017, all members of the Politburo and its Standing Committee are required to submit written reports to the General Secretary annually.

== Powers and position ==
The powers and roles of the general secretary are vaguely defined, with no term limits or written rules for selecting a successor. However, as China is a one-party state under the CCP, the general secretary holds ultimate power and authority over the party and state, and is usually considered the "paramount leader" of China. The general secretary has been the highest-ranking official in China's political system since 1982. (Note: The de facto leader Deng Xiaoping was 3rd ranking official in the 12th Politburo Standing Committee, and 2nd ranking official in the 13th Central Committee, after General Secretary Zhao Ziyang, but before President Yang Shangkun and Premier Li Peng. Deng at the time served as Chairman of the Central Military Commission and was ranked third or second overall in the leadership hierarchy.) According to the CCP constitution, the general secretary serves as an ex officio member of the Politburo Standing Committee. The location of the office of the general secretary is the Qinzheng Hall in Zhongnanhai, which also serves as the headquarters of the Secretariat.

=== Election and term of office ===
The CCP general secretary is officially elected by a plenary meeting of the Central Committee of the Chinese Communist Party from among the members of the Politburo Standing Committee. In practice, the de facto method of selecting the general secretary has varied over time. According to the current CCP constitution, the term of office of the general secretary is the same as that of the Central Committee, which is five years. There is no limit to the number of consecutive terms, and theoretically, the officeholder can serve an unlimited number of terms.

=== Role and authority ===
According to internal regulations, the general secretary is responsible for convening the meetings of the Politburo and the Politburo Standing Committee. The general secretary additionally presides over the work of the Secretariat. The general secretary sets the topics of Central Committee, Politburo and Politburo Standing Committee meetings. Internal regulations state that decision-making and coordinating bodies of the CCP Central Committee can convene meetings to study, decide on, and coordinate major tasks in relevant fields based on the decisions of the Central Committee and the general secretary's instructions, with the agenda items for these meetings determined or approved by the general secretary. A Politburo meeting in October 2017 after the first plenary session of the 19th CCP Central Committee stipulated that all Politburo members must make an annual written presentation to the general secretary and the Central Committee. At the opening of a CCP National Congress, the general secretary delivers the political report of the incumbent Central Committee, which details the work of the Central Committee in the last five years as well as the goals for the upcoming years.

=== Protocol ===
According to Hong Kong media reports, per the implementation rules of the Central Committee's Eight-point Regulation, the status of the general secretary is superior to that of other members of the Politburo Standing Committee, enjoying a number of special treatments, which highlight the position's supreme status. There is no limit on the length of news reports, live television broadcasts can be arranged, synchronized audio can be broadcast, and the number of accompanying reporters is not limited for the general secretary. The general secretary can take a special plane when visiting foreign countries, and reports on foreign visits can be accompanied by side notes, features, and summaries, with no limit on the number of words.

== See also ==
- Office of the General Secretary of the Chinese Communist Party
- Leader of the Chinese Communist Party
- Order of precedence in China
- Leadership core
