= 12th National Congress of the Chinese Communist Party =

1982 Chinese Communist Party conference

12th National Congress of the Chinese Communist Party 中国共产党第十二次全国代表大会
- The emblem of the Chinese Communist Party at the 12th National Congress
- Begins: September 1, 1982
- Ends: September 11, 1982
- Locations: Great Hall of the People, Beijing, China
- Previous event: 11th National Congress of the Chinese Communist Party (1977)
- Next event: 13th National Congress of the Chinese Communist Party (1987)
- Participants: 1,600 delegates
- Major events: Election of the 12th Central Committee and 12th Central Commission for Discipline Inspection
- Leader: Hu Yaobang (Leader of the Chinese Communist Party)

12th National Congress of the Chinese Communist Party
- Simplified Chinese: 中国共产党第十二次全国代表大会
- Traditional Chinese: 中國共產黨第十二次全國代表大會
Transcriptions
Standard Mandarin
- Hanyu Pinyin: Zhōngguó Gòngchǎndǎng dì Shí'èr cì Quánguó Dàibiǎo Dàhuì

Abbreviated name
- Chinese: 十二大
Transcriptions
Standard Mandarin
- Hanyu Pinyin: Shí'èr dà

The 12th National Congress of the Chinese Communist Party was convened from September 1–11, 1982. The path of modernization through socialism was laid out. 1,600 delegates and 160 alternate delegates represented the party's 39.65 million members. It was preceded by the 11th National Congress of the Chinese Communist Party, and succeeded by the 13th National Congress of the Chinese Communist Party. It coincided with the time in which leader Deng Xiaoping was Chairman of the Central Advisory Commission.

== Content ==
At the 12th National Congress, Hu Yaobang's report addressed the Chinese diplomatic concept of the Five Principles of Peaceful Coexistence, stating, "China adheres to an independent foreign policy and develops relationships with other countries under the guidance of the Five Principles of Peaceful Coexistence." According to the view articulated by Hu in his report, "China will never be dependent on any big country or group of countries, nor will it yield to the pressure of any big country [...] The Five Principles of Peaceful Coexistence apply to our relations with all countries, including socialist countries."

Chinese unification was among the CCP priorities identified by Deng.

=== 1982 Party constitution ===
The 12th National Congress adopted the Communist Party's constitution. Although the constitution has been revised since, its basic content continues to be the 1982 constitution.

The Party's oath has been written into the constitution since 12th National Congress.

== See also ==
- 12th Central Committee of the Chinese Communist Party
