= 17th Central Commission for Discipline Inspection =

Commission in the Chinese Communist Party

The 17th Central Commission for Discipline Inspection (CCDI) was elected at the 17th National Congress of the Chinese Communist Party on 21 October 2007. Its 1st Plenary Session elected the Secretary, deputy secretaries and the 17th Standing Committee of the CCDI.

== Plenums ==
- 1st Plenary Session (22 October 2007)
- 2nd Plenary Session (14–16 January 2008)
- 3rd Plenary Session (12–14 January 2009)
- 4th Plenary Session (19 September 2009)
- 5th Plenary Session (11–13 January 2010)

== Members ==
- Gan Yisheng
- Yu Qilong
- Ma Wen (female)
- Ma Zhipeng
- Wang Wei
- Wang Yong
- Wang Weilu
- Wang Zhengfu (Miao)
- Wang Liying (female)
- Wang Huayuan – expelled from the party in 2009
- Wang Huaqing
- Wang Shouxiang
- Wang Zhigang
- Wang Zhongmin
- Wang Hemin
- Wang Junlian (female)
- Wang Hongzhang
- Wang Guanzhong
- Wang Lili (female)
- Zhi Shuping
- Rinqengyai (Tibetan)
- Qiu Baoxing
- Gou Qingming
- Bater (Mongolian)
- Deng Tiansheng
- Ye Qingchun
- Tian Lipu
- Linghu An
- Feng Shoumiao
- Feng Mingang
- Nian Fuchun
- Zhu Mingguo (Li)
- Zhu Baocheng
- Liu Yuting
- Liu Yazhou
- Liu Jianhua (female)
- Liu Chunliang
- Liu Xiaorong
- An Limin (female)
- Xu Yunzhao
- Xu Dazhe
- Sun Zhongtong
- Sun Baoshu
- Sun Sijing
- Du Juan (female)
- Du Xuefang (female)
- Du Hengyan
- Li Gang
- Li Xi
- Li Xiaoxue
- Li Yufu
- Li Liguo
- Li Hanbai (Bai)
- Li Yanzhi (female)
- Li Jinzhang
- Li Faquan
- Li Shishi
- Li Hongfeng
- Li Qingyin
- Yang Shiqiu
- Yang Chuansheng
- Yang Limin
- Yang Jianting
- Wu Yuliang
- Wu Yuping (female)
- Qiu Xueqiang
- He Ping
- He Yong
- Shen Deyong
- Song Yuying (female)
- Zhang Jun
- Zhang Yi
- Zhang Rucheng
- Zhang Jinan
- Zhang Jianping
- Zhang Yannong
- Zhang Tiejian
- Zhang Huixin
- Chen Xi
- Chen Wenqing
- Chen Xunqiu
- Chen Jiwa (female)
- Chen Xinquan
- Chen Jiping
- Shao Mingli
- Shao Qiwei
- Fan Yinhua
- Ou Zegao (Tibetan)
- Shang Yong
- Jin Shubo
- Jin Daoming (Manchu)
- Zhou Ying (female)
- Qu Wanxiang
- Xiang Zongxi
- Zhao Tiechui
- Hu Yumin (female)
- Duan Luding
- Zhu Chunlin
- Yao Zengke
- He Bangjing (female, Bai)
- He Guoqiang
- Yuan Guiren
- Xu Bin
- Xu Tianliang
- Xu Jingye
- Xi Guohua
- Gao Wusheng
- Guo Yongping
- Guo Yanyan
- Huang Zuoxing
- Huang Shuxian
- Huang Dianzhong
- Cao Kangtai
- Fu Qiang
- Dong Junshu
- Jiang Wenlan (female)
- Fu Chengyu
- Fu Wenjuan (female)
- Xie Fuzhan
- Xie Xuezhi
- Xie Zhenhua
- Cai Jihua
- Zang Shengye
- Zang Xianfu
- Luo Shugang
- Zhai Xiaoheng
- Wei Jiafu
