= 16th Central Commission for Discipline Inspection =

The 16th Central Commission for Discipline Inspection (CCDI) was elected at the 16th National Congress of the Chinese Communist Party on 15 November 2002. Its 1st Plenary Session elected the Secretary, deputy secretaries and the 16th Standing Committee of the CCDI.

== Members ==
- Gan Yisheng
- Ma Wen (female)
- Ma Zilong (Hui)
- Ma Zhipeng
- Ma Tieshan
- Wang Chengming
- Wang Tongzhuo
- Wang Huayuan
- Wang Shouting
- Wang Zhigang
- Wang Jianzhou
- Wang Xianzheng
- Wang Zhenchuan
- Wang Lili (female)
- Wang Weizhong
- Wang Deshun
- Yin Fengqi
- Bater (Mongolian)
- Bu Qiong (Tibetan)
- Tian Shulan (female)
- Baima (Tibetan)
- Feng Yongsheng
- Feng Jianshen
- Xing Yuanmin
- Zhu Weiqun
- Qiao Zonghuai
- Ren Zemin
- Liu Jiang
- Liu Fengfu
- Liu Zhifeng
- Liu Xiaojiang
- Liu Fengyan
- Liu Jiayi
- Liu Xirong
- An Limin (female)
- Sun Wensheng
- Sun Baoshu
- Sun Zaifu
- Yang Anjiang
- Li Wenhua
- Li Yufu
- Li Dongsheng
- Li Youwei
- Li Zhilun
- Li Chuanqing
- Li Yunzhi
- Li Jinming
- Li Jisong
- Li Xueying (female)
- Li Chongxi
- Li Qinglin
- Yang Guanghong
- Yang Duoliang (Hui)
- Wu Guangcai
- Wu Yuliang
- Wu Guanzheng
- Wu Yuping (female)
- He Yong
- Shen Shuji (female)
- Shen Deyong
- Zhang Yi
- Zhang Fenglou
- Zhang Shutian
- Zhang Enzhao
- Zhang Yuzhong
- Zhang Huixin
- Chen Xi
- Chen Peizhong
- Chen Jiping
- Fan Xinde
- Lin Wenken
- Luo Shiqian
- Yue Xuanyi
- Jin Yinhuan (female)
- Jin Daoming (Manchu)
- Zhou Zhanshun
- Zheng Kunsheng
- Zhao Rong
- Zhao Chunlan (female)
- Zhao Hongzhu
- Hu Jiayan (female)
- Zhu Guangyao
- Zhu Chunlin
- He Bangjing (female, Bai)
- Qin Shaode
- Nie Chenggen
- Jia Wenxian
- Xia Zanzhong
- Xu Chengdong
- Xu Jingye
- Gao Junliang
- Tao Fanggui
- Huang Danhua (female)
- Huang Yuanzhi
- Huang Shuxian
- Huang Shuhe
- Huang Xianzhong
- Cao Hongxing
- Cao Kangtai
- Chang Xiaobing
- Cui Huilie
- Kang Rixin
- Liang Yiping (female)
- Peng Xiaofeng
- Dong Lei
- Dong Wancai
- Dong Yisheng
- Han Changfu
- Han Zhongxin
- Fu Kecheng
- Jiao Huancheng
- Xie Zuoyan
- Lou Jiwei
- Xie Houquan
- Cai Changsong
- Zhai Xiaoheng
- Fan Shouzhi
- Teng Jiuming
- Xue Li (female)
- Wei Jianguo
- Wei Jiafu
