= 18th Central Commission for Discipline Inspection =

The 18th Central Commission for Discipline Inspection (CCDI) was elected at the 18th National Congress of the Chinese Communist Party on 14 November 2012. Its 1st Plenary Session elected the Secretary, deputy secretaries and the 18th Standing Committee of the CCDI.

== Members ==
- Yu Chunsheng
- Ma Yongxia (female)
- Wang Wei (王伟)
- Wang Wei (王炜)
- Wang Changhe
- Wang Dongfeng
- Wang Liying (female)
- Wang Zhongtian — formally expelled from the party at the Seventh Plenum in January 2017.
- Wang Huaqing
- Wang Huisheng
- Wang Qishan
- Wang Huaichen
- Wang Zhongmin
- Wang Hemin
- Wang Yilin
- Wang Xiaolong
- Wang Jiasheng
- Wang Binyi
- Wang Sentai
- Wang Ruisheng
- Dainzhub Ongboin (Tibetan)
- Yin Jinhua
- Shi Shenglong (Manchu)
- Ye Qingchun
- Shen Weichen — expelled at Fifth Plenum in January 2015.
- Fu Jianhua
- Feng Huimin (female)
- Ning Gaoning
- Hong Qiang (female)
- Qu Qingshan
- Qu Shuhui (female) — demoted and put on two-year party probation in July 2016
- Lu Jiancheng
- Ren Zemin
- Doje Radain (Tibetan)
- Liu Bin
- Liu Changyin
- Liu Shengjie — dismissed at the Eighth Plenum in October 2017
- Liu Xiangsong
- Liu Jinguo
- Liu Jianhua (female)
- Liu Xiaobin
- Liu Cigui
- Jiang Bixin
- An Limin (female)
- Su Bo
- Du Jincai
- Du Jinfu
- Li Ning
- Li Gang — put on one-year party probation in October 2017
- Li Xi
- Li Wusi
- Li Shulei
- Li Yufu
- Li Zhaoqian
- Li Faquan
- Li Jianbo — ordered to resign at the Seventh Plenum in January 2017.
- Li Shishi
- Li Qiufang (female)
- Li Jiaxiang
- Yang Lishun
- Yang Zhijin
- Yang Mingsheng
- Yang Xiaodu
- Xiao Yaqing
- Wu Gang
- Wu Yuliang
- Wu Jieming
- Cen Xu
- Qiu Xueqiang
- He Ping
- Yu Xinrong
- Xin Weiguang
- Wang Min
- Song Mingchang
- Song Airong (female)
- Song Xuantao
- Zhang Li
- Zhang Jun
- Zhang Yong
- Zhang Lijun
- Zhang Jinan
- Zhang Changping
- Zhang Xiaolan (female)
- Zhang Xiaogang
- Chen Lun
- Chen Dawei
- Chen Wenqing
- Chen Xunqiu
- Chen Jianmin
- Chen Xuguo
- Chen Xinquan
- Miao Hua
- Jin Shubo
- Zhou Ying (female)
- Zhou Zemin
- Zhou Fuqi
- Zheng Guoguang
- Zhao Hongzhu
- Hu Yumin (female)
- Hu Wenming
- Hou Kai
- Hou Chang'an
- Hou Hehua
- Yu Guilin
- Yao Zengke
- Yuan Yanpeng
- Geng Wenqing
- Geng Liaoyuan
- Chai Shaoliang
- Xu Jingye
- Guo Yongping
- Guo Xiangyuan
- Huang Xianyao
- Huang Jianguo (Hunan)
- Huang Jianguo (People's Liberation Army)
- Huang Jiansheng
- Huang Shuxian
- Huang Xiaowei (female)
- Huang Dianzhong
- Cao Peixi
- Cui Shaopeng
- Liang Bin — expelled at Fifth Plenum in January 2015.
- Dong Li
- Han Henglin
- Xie Hangsheng
- Xie Guoming
- Qiang Weidong
- Zang Xianfu
- Xiong Weiping
- Li Xiaohong
