= Standing Committee of the 16th Central Commission for Discipline Inspection =

The 16th Standing Committee of the Central Commission for Discipline Inspection (CCDI) was elected at the 1st Plenary Session of the 16th CCDI and then endorsed by the 1st Plenary Session of the 16th Central Committee on 15 November 2002.

== Members ==
Name (birth–death)	Took office	Left office	Duration
Gan Yisheng (born ?)	15 November 2002	21 October 2007	4 years, 340 days
Ma Wen (born 1948)	15 November 2002	21 October 2007	4 years, 340 days
Ma Zhipeng (born ?)	15 November 2002	21 October 2007	4 years, 340 days
Wang Zhenchuan (born ?)	15 November 2002	21 October 2007	4 years, 340 days
Liu Fengyan (born 1940)	15 November 2002	21 October 2007	4 years, 340 days
Liu Jiayi (born ?)	15 November 2002	21 October 2007	4 years, 340 days
Liu Xirong (born 1942)	15 November 2002	21 October 2007	4 years, 340 days
Li Zhilun (1942–2007)	15 November 2002	28 April 2007	4 years, 164 days
Wu Guanzheng (born 1938)	15 November 2002	21 October 2007	4 years, 340 days
Wu Yuping (born ?)	15 November 2002	21 October 2007	4 years, 340 days
He Yong (born 1940)	15 November 2002	21 October 2007	4 years, 340 days
Shen Deyong (born ?)	15 November 2002	21 October 2007	4 years, 340 days
Zhang Shutian (born 1939)	15 November 2002	21 October 2007	4 years, 340 days
Zhang Huixin (born 1939)	15 November 2002	21 October 2007	4 years, 340 days
Zhao Hongzhu (born 1947)	15 November 2002	21 October 2007	4 years, 340 days
Xia Zanzhong (born 1939)	15 November 2002	21 October 2007	4 years, 340 days
Huang Shuxian (born 1954)	15 November 2002	21 October 2007	4 years, 340 days
Xie Houquan (born ?)	15 November 2002	21 October 2007	4 years, 340 days
