= Deputy Secretary of the Central Commission for Discipline Inspection =

Government official in China

The Deputy Secretary of the Central Commission for Discipline Inspection (Chinese: 中国共产党中央纪律检查委员会副书记) is the deputy to the Secretary of the Central Commission for Discipline Inspection (CCDI) of the Chinese Communist Party (CCP). Normally there are several people serving as deputy secretary at any given time. As a rule of thumb, the deputy secretaries of the CCDI are ranked at the same level as a minister of the state; however, if they also hold seats on the CCP Secretariat of the Central Committee, as was the case with He Yong and Zhao Hongzhu, then they are ranked one level higher, as a deputy national leader.

== Deputy Secretary of the Central Commission for Discipline Inspection (1949–1955) ==
Name (birth–death)	Hanzi	Took office	Left office	Tenure	Term(s)
Wang Congwu (1910–2001)	王从吾	November 1949	31 March 1955	5 years, 121 days	7th
An Ziwen (1909–1980)	安子文	November 1949	31 March 1955	5 years, 121 days	7th
Qiang Ying (1903–1973)	钱瑛	November 1949	31 March 1955	5 years, 121 days	7th
Liu Lan Tao (1910–1997)	刘澜涛	November 1949	31 March 1955	5 years, 121 days	7th
Xie Juezai (1884–1971)	谢觉哉	November 1949	31 March 1955	5 years, 121 days	7th
Li Baohua (1909–2005)	李葆华	November 1949	31 March 1955	5 years, 121 days	7th
Liu Jingfan (1910–1990)	刘景范	November 1949	31 March 1955	5 years, 121 days	7th
Xue Muqiao (1904–2005)	薛暮桥	November 1949	31 March 1955	5 years, 121 days	7th
Liang Hua (1906–1956)	梁华	November 1949	31 March 1955	5 years, 121 days	7th
Feng Naichao (1901–1983)	冯乃超	November 1949	31 March 1955	5 years, 121 days	7th

== Deputy Secretary of the Central Control Commission (1955–1966) ==
Military rank	Name (birth–death)	Hanzi	Took office	Left office	Tenure	Term(s)
—	Liu Lantao (1910–1997)	刘澜涛	31 March 1955	27 September 1962	7 years, 180 days	7th, 8th
Grand General	Tan Zheng (1906–1988)	谭政	31 March 1955	27 September 1956	1 year, 180 days	7th
—	Wang Congwu (1910–2001)	王从吾	31 March 1955	12 August 1966	11 years, 134 days	7th, 8th
—	Qiang Ying (1903–1973)	钱瑛	31 March 1955	12 August 1966	11 years, 134 days	7th, 8th
—	Liu Xiwu (1904–1970)	刘锡五	31 March 1955	12 August 1966	11 years, 134 days	7th, 8th
General	Xiao Hua (1916–1985)	萧华	27 September 1956	12 August 1966	9 years, 319 days	8th
Grand General	Zhang Yunyi (1892–1974)	张云逸	27 September 1962	12 August 1966	3 years, 319 days	8th

== Second Secretary of the Central Commission for Discipline Inspection (1978–1985) ==
Military rank	Name (birth–death)	Hanzi	Took office	Left office	Tenure	Term(s)
—	Deng Yingchao (1904–1992)	邓颖超	22 December 1978	11 September 1982	3 years, 263 days	11th
Grand General	Huang Kecheng (1902–1986)	黄克诚	11 September 1982	September 1985	2 years, 355 days	12th

== Secretary of the Central Commission for Discipline Inspection (1978–1987) ==
Name (birth–death)	Hanzi	Took office	Left office	Tenure	Term(s)
Wang Heshou (1909–1999)	王鹤寿	22 December 1978	11 September 1982	3 years, 263 days	11th
Wang Congwu (1910–2001)	王从吾	22 December 1978	September 1985	6 years, 253 days	11th, 12th
Ma Guorui (1915–2005)	马国瑞	22 December 1978	September 1985	6 years, 253 days	11th, 12th
Liu Shunyuan (1903–1996)	刘顺元	22 December 1978	11 September 1982	3 years, 263 days	11th
Zhang Qilong (1900–1987)	张启龙	22 December 1978	11 September 1982	3 years, 263 days	11th
Yuan Renyuan (1896–1986)	袁任远	22 December 1978	11 September 1982	3 years, 263 days	11th
Zhang Yun (1905–1995)	章蕴	22 December 1978	11 September 1982	3 years, 263 days	11th
Guo Shushen (1904–1994)	郭述申	22 December 1978	11 September 1982	3 years, 263 days	11th
Li Yimeng (1903–1990)	李一氓	22 December 1978	11 September 1982	3 years, 263 days	11th
Wei Wenbo (1905–1987)	魏文伯	22 December 1978	11 September 1982	3 years, 263 days	11th
Zhang Ce (1911–1999)	张策	22 December 1978	11 September 1982	3 years, 263 days	11th
Han Tianshi (1914–2010)	韩天石	11 September 1982	1 November 1987	5 years, 51 days	12th
Li Chang (1914–2010)	李昌	11 September 1982	September 1985	2 years, 355 days	12th

== Deputy Secretary of the Central Commission for Discipline Inspection (1987–present) ==
Name (birth–death)	Hanzi	Year		Took office	Left office	Tenure	Term(s)
Name (birth–death)	Hanzi	Birth	Death	Took office	Left office	Tenure	Term(s)
Han Tianshi	韩天石	1914	2010	1 November 1987	18 September 1997	9 years, 321 days	12th
Chen Zuolin	陈作霖	1923	2015	1 November 1987	18 October 1992	4 years, 352 days	13th, 14th
Li Zhengting	李正亭	1918	2011	1 November 1987	18 October 1992	4 years, 352 days	13th
Xiao Hongda	肖洪达	1918	2005	1 November 1987	18 October 1992	4 years, 352 days	13th
Wangde Ying	王德瑛	1931	—	December 1990	18 September 1997	6 years, 291 days	13th, 14th
Hou Zongbin	侯宗宾	1929	2017	18 October 1992	18 September 1997	4 years, 335 days	14th
Cao Qingze	曹庆泽	1932	2015	18 October 1992	14 November 2002	10 years, 27 days	14th, 15th
Xu Qing	徐青	1926	—	18 October 1992	18 September 1997	4 years, 335 days	14th
Han Zhubin	韩杼滨	1932	—	18 September 1997	14 November 2002	5 years, 57 days	15th
He Yong	何勇	1940	—	18 September 1997	15 November 2012	15 years, 58 days	15th, 16th, 17th
Zhou Ziyu	周子玉	1935	—	18 September 1997	14 November 2002	4 years, 361 days	15th
Xia Zanzhong	夏赞忠	1939	—	18 September 1997	21 October 2007	10 years, 33 days	15th, 16th
Liu Liying	刘丽英	1939	—	18 September 1997	14 November 2002	4 years, 361 days	15th
Liu Xirong	刘锡荣	1942	—	14 January 2000	21 October 2007	7 years, 280 days	15th, 16th
Fu Jie	傅杰	1935	—	14 January 2000	14 November 2002	2 years, 243 days	15th
Zhang Huixin	张惠新	1939	—	25 January 2002	21 October 2007	5 years, 269 days	15th, 16th
Li Zhilun	李至伦	1942	2017	25 January 2002	28 April 2007	5 years, 93 days	16th
Zhang Shutian	张树田	1939	—	14 November 2002	21 October 2007	4 years, 341 days	16th
Liu Fengyan	刘峰岩	1940	—	14 November 2002	21 October 2007	4 years, 341 days	16th
Ma Wen	马馼	1948	—	13 January 2004	15 November 2012	8 years, 307 days	16th, 17th
Gan Yisheng	干以胜	1945	—	10 January 2007	15 November 2012	8 years, 310 days	16th, 17th
Sun Zhongtong	孙忠同	1944	—	21 October 2007	15 November 2012	5 years, 25 days	17th
Zhang Yi	张毅	1950	—	21 October 2007	15 November 2012	5 years, 25 days	17th
Huang Shuxian	黄树贤	1954	—	21 October 2007	7 November 2016	9 years, 17 days	17th, 18th
Li Yufu	李玉赋	1954	—	21 October 2007	25 October 2014	7 years, 4 days	17th, 18th
Wu Yuliang	吴玉良	1952	—	11 January 2011	25 October 2017	6 years, 287 days	17th, 18th
Chen Wenqing	陈文清	1960	—	4 November 2011	26 May 2015	3 years, 206 days	17th, 18th
Zhao Hongzhu	赵洪祝	1947	—	15 November 2012	25 October 2017	4 years, 344 days	18th
Du Jincai	杜金才	1952	—	15 November 2012	25 October 2017	3 years, 345 days	18th
Zhang Jun	张军	1956	—	15 November 2012	24 February 2017	4 years, 101 days	18th
Wang Wei	王伟	1960	—	15 November 2012	21 May 2013	187 days	18th
Yang Xiaodu	杨晓渡	1953	—	21 January 2013	23 October 2022	9 years, 275 days	18th, 19th
Liu Jinguo	刘金国	1955	—	25 October 2014	—	11 years, 306 days	18th, 19th, 20th
Li Shulei	李书磊	1964	—	15 January 2017	—	9 years, 224 days	18th, 19th
Zhang Shengmin	张升民	1958	—	25 October 2017	—	8 years, 306 days	19th
Yang Xiaochao	杨晓超	1958	—	25 October 2017	—	8 years, 306 days	19th
Xu Lingyi	徐令义	1958	—	25 October 2017	—	8 years, 306 days	19th
Xiao Pei	肖培	1961	—	25 October 2017	—	8 years, 306 days	19th
Chen Xiaojiang	陈小江	1962	—	25 October 2017	11 December 2020	3 years, 47 days	19th
