= Zhang Lijun =

Zhang Lijun is the name of:

- Zhang Lijun (economist) (born 1963), Chinese economist
- Zhang Lijun (politician) (born 1952), Chinese politician
- Zhang Lijun (sitting volleyball) (born 1985), Chinese sitting volleyball player
- Zhang Lijun (curler) (born 1996), Chinese curler
