= Doje Cering =

Chinese politician

- རྡོ་རྗེ་ཚེ་རིང་

Chairperson of the National People's Congress Ethnic Affairs Committee
- In office March 2003 – March 2008
- Preceded by: Wang Zhaowen
- Succeeded by: Ma Qizhi

Minister of Civil Affairs
- In office 29 March 1993 – 17 March 2003
- Premier: Li Peng; Zhu Rongji
- Preceded by: Cui Naifu
- Succeeded by: Li Xueju

Chairman of Tibet
- In office 1985 – May 1990
- Party Secretary: Wu Jinghua; Hu Jintao
- Preceded by: Dorje Tseten
- Succeeded by: Gyaincain Norbu

Personal details
- Born: November 1939 (age 86) Xiahe County, Gansu, China
- Party: Chinese Communist Party

Chinese name
- Simplified Chinese: 多吉才让
- Traditional Chinese: 多吉才讓
Transcriptions
Standard Mandarin
- Hanyu Pinyin: Duōjícáiràng

Doje Cering (Tibetan: རྡོ་རྗེ་ཚེ་རིང་, Wylie: rdo rje tshe ring, ZWPY: Doje Cering; Chinese: 多吉才让; born November 1939) is a Chinese politician of Tibetan ethnicity who served as chairperson of the National People's Congress Ethnic Affairs Committee from 2003 to 2008, minister of Civil Affairs from 1993 to 2003, and Chairman of Tibet from 1985 to 1990.

He was a member of the 12th CCP Central Commission for Discipline Inspection. He was a member of the 13th, 14th, 15th and 16th Central Committee of the Chinese Communist Party. He was a member of the Standing Committee of the 10th National People's Congress.

== Biography ==
Doje Cering was born in Xiahe County, Gansu, in November 1939.

He entered the workforce in August 1955, and joined the Chinese Communist Party in October 1960. During the Cultural Revolution, he suffered political persecution. He was magistrate of Gyaca County, first party secretary of Shannan, and first party secretary of Shigatse. In 1983, he was promoted to become vice chairman of Tibet Autonomous Region, rising to chairman in 1985. He served as deputy minister of Civil Affairs in May 1990, and was promoted to the minister position in March 1993. In March 2003, he was proposed as chairperson of the National People's Congress Ethnic Affairs Committee.

Government offices
Preceded by Dorje Tseten	Chairman of Tibet; 1985–1990	Succeeded by Gyaincain Norbu
Preceded by Cui Naifu	Minister of Civil Affairs; 1993–2003	Succeeded by Li Xueju
Assembly seats
Preceded by Wang Zhaowen	Chairperson of the National People's Congress Ethnic Affairs Committee; 2003–2008	Succeeded by Ma Qizhi
