= Minister of Civil Affairs =

Minister of the People's Republic of China

Minister of Civil Affairs of the People's Republic of China
- 中华人民共和国民政部部长
- National Emblem of China

- Flag of China
- Incumbent; Li Changguan since 28 August 2026
- Ministry of Civil Affairs
- Status: Provincial and ministerial-level official
- Member of: Plenary Meeting of the State Council
- Seat: Ministry of Civil Affairs, Xicheng District, Beijing
- Nominator: Premier (chosen within the Chinese Communist Party)
- Appointer: President; with the confirmation of the National People's Congress or its Standing Committee
- Formation: 19 October 1949; 76 years ago
- First holder: Xie Juezai
- Deputy: Vice Minister of Civil Affairs

The minister of civil affairs of the People's Republic of China is the head of the Ministry of Civil Affairs of the People's Republic of China and a member of the State Council. Within the State Council, the position is tenth in order of precedence. The minister is responsible for leading the ministry, presiding over its meetings, and signing important documents related to the ministry. Officially, the minister is nominated by the premier of the State Council, who is then approved by the National People's Congress or its Standing Committee and appointed by the president.

The current minister is Li Changguan, who concurrently serves as the Communist Party Secretary of the Ministry.

== History ==
The Ministry of the Interior of the Central People's Government was established on 1 October 1949, and Xie Juezai became the first minister on 19 October. The ministry was reorganized to the Ministry of the Interior of the PRC in September 1954, and the title of the minister was also changed. On 3 January 1969, the Ministry of the Interior was abolished, along with the post of minister. The minister of civil affairs was established on 5 March 1978.

== List of ministers ==
No.	Portrait	Name (Birth–Death)	Term of office			Important offices held during tenure	Premier	Ref.
No.	Portrait	Name (Birth–Death)	Took office	Left office	Term	Important offices held during tenure	Premier	Ref.
Minister of the Interior of the Central People's Government
1		Xie Juezai 谢觉哉 (1884–1971)	19 October 1949	28 September 1954	4 years, 344 days	Member of the Legislative Affairs Commission of the Central People's Government; Member of the Political and Legal Committee of the Government Affairs Council	Zhou Enlai	
Minister of the Interior of the People's Republic of China
1		Xie Juezai 谢觉哉 (1884–1971)	28 September 1954	29 April 1959	4 years, 213 days		Zhou Enlai	
2		Qian Ying 钱瑛 (1903–1973)	29 April 1959	23 November 1960	1 year, 208 days	Secretary of the Party Leadership Group of the Ministry of the Interior	Zhou Enlai	
3		Zeng Shan 曾山 (1899–1972)	23 November 1960	11 December 1968	8 years, 18 days	Member of the CCP Central Committee	Zhou Enlai	
From 11 December 1968, the post of Minister of the Interior was abolished. On 5 March 1978, the post of Minister of Civil Affairs was established.
Minister of Civil Affairs of the People's Republic of China
4		Cheng Zihua 程子华 (1905–1991)	5 March 1978	4 May 1982	4 years, 60 days	Secretary of the Party Leadership Group of the Ministry of Civil Affairs; Vice Chairman of the Chinese People's Political Consultative Conference	Hua Guofeng ↓ Zhao Ziyang	
5		Cui Naifu 崔乃夫 (1928–2023)	4 May 1982	29 March 1993	10 years, 329 days	Secretary of the Party Leadership Group of the Ministry of Civil Affairs	Zhao Ziyang ↓ Li Peng	
6		Doje Cering 多吉才让 (born 1939)	29 March 1993	17 March 2003	9 years, 353 days	Deputy Director of China International Committee for Disaster Reduction	Li Peng ↓ Zhu Rongji	
7		Li Xueju 李学举 (born 1945)	17 March 2003	25 June 2010	7 years, 100 days	Member of the CCP Central Committee	Wen Jiabao	
8		Li Liguo 李立国 (born 1953)	25 June 2010	6 November 2016	6 years, 134 days	Secretary of the Party Leadership Group of the Ministry of Civil Affairs; Member of the CCP Central Committee	Wen Jiabao ↓ Li Keqiang	
9		Huang Shuxian 黄树贤 (born 1954)	6 November 2016	26 October 2019	2 years, 354 days	Secretary of the Party Leadership Group of the Ministry of Civil Affairs	Li Keqiang	
10		Li Jiheng 李纪恒 (born 1957)	26 October 2019	28 February 2022	2 years, 125 days	Secretary of the Party Leadership Group of the Ministry of Civil Affairs	Li Keqiang	
11		Tang Dengjie 唐登杰 (born 1964)	28 February 2022	29 December 2023	1 year, 304 days	Secretary of the Party Leadership Group of the Ministry of Civil Affairs	Li Keqiang ↓ Li Qiang	
12		Lu Zhiyuan 陆治原 (born 1964)	29 December 2023	28 August 2026	2 years, 242 days	Secretary of the Party Leadership Group of the Ministry of Civil Affairs; Member of the CCP Central Committee	Li Qiang	
13		Li Changguan 李常官 (born 1968)	28 August 2026	incumbent	50 days	Secretary of the Party Leadership Group of the Ministry of Civil Affairs	Li Qiang	
