= Yunyi =

Yunyi may refer to the following people:

- Xia Yunyi (1596–1645), Ming dynasty poet
- Yunyi (prince) (1706–1755), Qing dynasty imperial prince
- Zhang Yunyi (1892–1974), Communist revolutionary and military strategist of the People's Republic of China
