= Xu Jingye =

Xu Jingye is the name of:

- Li Jingye (died 684), rebel leader during the Tang dynasty, also known as Xu Jingye
- Xu Jingye (PRC) (born 1951), People's Republic of China politician
