= Zhang Yunyi =

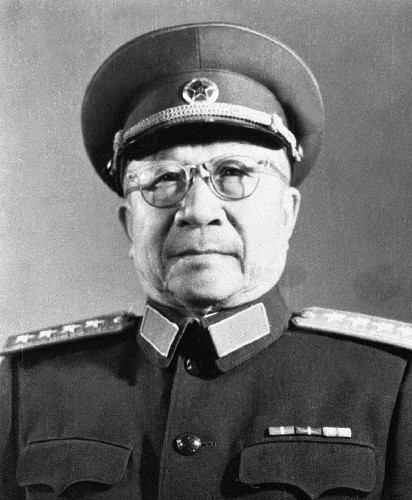

Deputy Secretary of the Central Control Commission
- In office 27 September 1962 – 12 August 1966 Serving with six other individuals: Liu Lan Tao (1955–1962); Tan Zheng (1955–1956); Wang Congwu (1955–1956); Qiang Ying (1955–1966); Liu Xiwu (1955–1966); Xiao Hua (1956–1966)

Personal details
- Born: August 10, 1892 Wenchang, Qiongzhou, Guangdong (now Wenchang, Hainan)
- Died: November 19, 1974 (aged 82)
- Awards: Order of Independence, Order of Liberation, Order of the PLA

Military service
- Allegiance: People's Republic of China
- Branch/service: People's Liberation Army
- Rank: Senior General
- Commands: Deputy commander-in-chief of the Eastern China Field Army, Chief of the General Staff

Zhang Yunyi (Chinese: 张云逸; August 10, 1892 – November 19, 1974) was a Communist revolutionary and military strategist of the People's Republic of China. Born in Wenchang, Hainan, he joined the Chinese Communist Party in 1926, and took part in the Northern Expedition, the Nanchang Uprising, the Baise Uprising, the Second Sino-Japanese War and the Chinese Civil War. Zhang held the posts of the army commander of the 7th Red Army, the assistant staff officer of the Military Commission of the Central Committee of the CCP, the commander of a military area, etc., and was named one of the ten Senior Generals (Da Jiang, the second highest rank in the PLA) in 1955. The Zhang Yunyi Memorial Hall is located in Wenchang, Hainan Province.

== Life ==
=== Early life ===
Zhang was born in a poor peasant family on August 10, 1892, in Wenchang, Guangdong (now is part of Hainan). At age eight he began studying at the Guangdong Army Primary School. Zhang's former name was Zhang Yunyi (云镒). Zhang Shengzhi was his alternate name. After he joined the revolution, he changed his name to Zhang Yunyi (云逸). In 1908, Zhang successfully passed the entrance examination of Whampoa Military Academy in Guangzhou and enrolled. In Oct. 1909, in primary school, Zhang joined the Tongmenghui (United League) secretly with a few of patriotic classmates. Zhang left the Whampoa Military Academy and took part in the Second Guangzhou Uprising in 1911. When the Xinhai Revolution against the Qing Dynasty broke out in 1911 he joined the Revolutionary Army and requested to be the captain of the bomb troops. After the establishment of the Provisional Government of the Republic of China in Nanjing in 1912, Zhang was recommended to the Humen, Guangdong Army accelerated school by the revolutionary government. In the midsummer of 1914, Zhang graduated from the accelerated school with excellent grades and went to work in Hainan. He took part in the National Protection War in 1915. And in 1921 Zhang Yunyi left Hainan Province for Guangzhou and joined Chen Jiongming with his campaign. In 1926, Zhang took part in the Northern Expedition as the Chief of staff. In the same year he was one of the commanders of wars in Tingsiqiao, Heshengqiao, Wuchang, Henan and so on. In October, 1926, he joined the Chinese Communist Party (CCP), through the recommendation of Wang Zhiren (王之仁).

=== Civil War ===
In 1927, the Chinese Civil War began when the Kuomintang (KMT) turned against the CCP. Zhang Yunyi sided with the Communists, and was one of the cadres sent to Guangxi in 1929 to take advantage of a political crisis there. After gaining a high post in the provincial garrison, Zhang led a mutiny that placed the troops under Communist command. After the Communist troops retreated into the countryside to found a rural soviet near Baise, Zhang became commander-in-chief of the Seventh Red Army. Despite some early successes, the revolt was put down by 1931 and Zhang and the rest of the leaders fled to the Jiangxi Soviet.

=== During the Sino-Japanese War ===
After the negotiation of the Xi'an Incident, Zhang Yunyi was sent to the southern area to unify the people of all ranks to resist the Japanese army. In April 1937, Zhang Yunyi, Zhou Enlai and Kong Shiquan went to Xi’an. When they arrived at Laoshan Mountain (劳山), they encountered a surprise attack conducted by the Kuomintang. Zhang Yunyi directed the successful evacuation of other people.

In late April 1937, Zhang Yunyi was sent to Hong Kong to lead the south anti-Japanese national united front (抗日民族统一战线). He collected donations in Hong Kong and Macao and persuaded Ye Ting to join the war against Japan. After the Marco Polo Bridge Incident, according to the instruction of the Central Committee of the Communist Party, Zhang Yunyi discussed with Li Zongren and Bai Chongxi in Guilin in hopes that Li and Bai would join the anti-Japanese national united front. Following the establishment of the Second United Front, an Eighth Route Army Office was formed in Guangzhou with Zhang as Director, holding the rank of Major General.

In January 1938, the New Fourth Army was established in Nanchang. Ye Ting was the Army commander, while Zhang Yunyi held the concurrent posts of chief of staff and commander of the third detachment. In the middle of December 1938, Zhang Yunyi headed the special task battalion and arrived at Anhui where the headquarters of the fourth detachment was located and shouldered the task of the war in the middle area of Anhui Province.

On May 5, 1939, the north Yangtze River command post of the New Fourth Army was established and Zhang Yunyi held the concurrent post of the general director and the Secretary of the CCP of the command post. In December 1940, with Xu Haidong, and Luo Binghui, Zhang Yunyi shattered the military attack of Collaborationist Chinese Army. The army in the north of the Yangtze River grew from 7000 to 10000 people.

At the beginning of 1941, after the New Fourth Army incident, Zhang Yunyi acted as the Deputy Commander of the New Fourth Army and the Commander of the 2nd Division. In 1945, from August 9 to 22, under the direction of Zhang Yunyi, the military and civilians of central China emancipated 17 counties and more than 200 towns. More than 12,000 soldiers of the Collaborationist Chinese Army were killed, thus winning the initial victory of the war.

=== During the Chinese Civil War ===
In January 1946, Zhang was concurrently appointed deputy commander of the Shandong Military Region taking charge of logistic maintenance and base construction of the New Fourth Army and the Shandong Military Region.

In January 1947, Zhang was appointed deputy commander of the East-China Military Region. In August, the East-China Military Region Office was moved to Huimin County, Shandong and the Rear Committee of the East-China Military Region Office was founded. Zhang was appointed as secretary. He led the Land Reform, Yan'an Rectification Movement, front-line support, and local armed forces construction. He also extended the East-China Field Army.

In November 1948, Zhang was concurrently appointed commander of the Shandong Military Region.

In January 1949, Zhang proposed the preparation for Yangtze River Crossing campaign and formulated strategic plans. In March, Zhang attended the Second Plenary Session of the Seventh Central Committee of the Communist Party. On September 22, Zhang was appointed secretary of the Guangxi Provincial Party Committee and chairman of People's Government of Guangxi. On September 21, the First Plenary Session of Chinese People's Political Consultative Conference was held. Zhang attended the conference as the chief representative of the South-China Chinese People’s Liberation Army. Zhang was appointed Committee member of Chinese People's Government Committee and Chinese People's Revolutionary Military Committee. In December, Zhang went to Guangxi for work and was concurrently appointed committee member of Central South Military Region Party Committee.

=== People's Republic of China ===
Not long after the establishment of the People's Republic of China, Zhang Yunyi was appointed to be the CCP party chief of Guangxi Province.

It was in Guangxi where Zhang had initiated the Baise Uprising with Deng Xiaoping in 1929. When he arrived in Guangxi, he launched the counterinsurgency immediately. It was quite hard due to the lack of manpower so Zhang had to personally fight with the opposition. In February, 1950, the lead agency of Guangxi Province formally founded.

Because of health problems, Zhang returned to Beijing in 1953, and was appointed as the Deputy Secretary of the Commission of PRC.

In the fall of 1955, Zhang Yunyi was endowed as the "Great General".

Zhang died on November 19, 1974. Deng Xiaoping read his eulogy at his funeral.

== Family ==
=== Marriage ===
His first wife, Wang Bizhen (王碧珍), married Zhang in 1914, and died in an air raid in Guangzhou.

His second wife, Han Bi (韩碧), married Zhang in 1923, and died in 1984.

Zhang Yunyi is the only one of the ten dajiang who had a concubine.

=== Children ===
The second son, Zhang Yuanzhi (张远之), born in 1928 to Han Bi, was the deputy secretary of Ministry of Nuclear Industry.

The younger son, Zhang Guangdong (张光东), born in 1946 to Han Bi, was the headmaster of the Shijiazhuang Army Command College (石家庄陆军指挥学院).

== Zhang Yunyi Memorial Hall ==
The Zhang Yunyi Memorial Hall is to the north of Wenchang Middle School in Wenchang, Hainan Island. It was built in memory of the 100th anniversary of the birth of General Zhang Yunyi. Sitting east to west, the memorial hall covers an area of 7962 square meters, 8 meters high, 12 meters wide, and the roof top is decorated with green glaze. Six golden words, “张云逸纪念馆”, which is written by Nie Rongzhen, is engraved in the middle of the lintel. Between the gate and the exhibition room lies Zhang Yunyi's bronze body sculpture at a height of 8 meters, with the golden words “张云逸大将” written by Peng Zhen engraved on its base. In the exhibition room behind the structure, photographs, graphs, pictures, manuscripts and entities are exhibited, presenting the life of Zhang Yunyi systematically.

== Writings ==
A Serious Mistake (一次重大失误), published on 《星火燎原 Unpublished manuscripts》in 2007.

== Bibliography ==
- Yang, Benjamin (1997). Deng: A Political Biography. New York: M. E. Sharpe. ISBN 978-0-7656-3208-1.
- Goodman, David (1994). Deng Xiaoping and the Chinese Revolution: A Political Biography. New York: Routledge. ISBN 978-1-134-83121-0.
- Han, Xiaorong (2014). Red God: Wei Baqun and His Peasant Revolution in Southern China. Albany, New York: State University of New York Press. ISBN 978-1-4384-5385-9.
- Pantsov, Alexander V.; Levine, Steven I. (2015). Deng Xiaoping: A Revolutionary Life. New York: Oxford University Press. ISBN 978-0-19-939205-6.
- Franz, Uli (1988). Artin, Tom (ed.). Deng Xiaoping. New York: Harcourt Brace Jovanovich. ISBN 978-0-15-125177-3.

Military offices
New title	Commander of the PLA Shandong Military District; 1949–1950	Succeeded by Xu Shiyou
