= Wang Huimin =

Wang Huimin, may refer to:

- Wang Huimin (volleyball player) (born 1992), Chinese volleyball player

== Politicians ==
- Wang Huimin (politician, born 1958), Chinese politician, vice chairman of the Fujian Provincial Committee of the Chinese People's Political Consultative Conference 2018–2020
- Wang Huimin (politician, born 1959), Chinese politician, vice chairman of the People's Congress of Xinjiang Uygur Autonomous Region from 2012 to 2014
- Wang Huimin (politician, born 1963), Chinese politician
- Wang Huimin (politician, born 1965), Chinese politician, president of Guangming Daily
