= Wang Congwu =

Chinese politician

- 王从吾

Secretary of the Central Commission for Discipline Inspection
- In office 22 December 1978 – September 1985 Serving with 12 other individuals: Wang Heshou (1978–1982); Ma Guorui (1978–1985); Shuan Yuan (1978–1982); Zhang Qilong (1978–1982); Yuan Ren (1978–1982); Zhang Yun (1978–1982); Guoshu Shen (1978–1982); Li Yimeng (1978–1982); Wei Wenbo (1978–1982); Zhang Ce (1978–1982); Han Tianshi (1982–1987); Li Chang (1982–1985)
- In office 31 March 1955 – 12 August 1966 Serving with six other individuals: Liu Lan Tao (1955–1962); Tan Zheng (1955–1956); Qiang Ying (1955–1966); Liu Xiwu (1955–1966); Xiao Hua (1956–1966); Zhang Yunyi (1952–1966)
- In office November 1949 – 31 March 1955 Serving with nine other individuals: An Ziwen (1949–1955); Qiang Ying (1949–1955); Liu Lan Tao (1949–1955); Xie Juezai (1949–1955); Li Baohua (1949–1955); Liu Jingfan (1949–1955); Xue Muqiao (1949–1955); Liang Hua (1949–1955); Feng Naichao (1949–1955)

President of the Central Party School
- In office 1961–1963
- Preceded by: Yang Xianzhen
- Succeeded by: Lin Feng

Personal details
- Born: February 1910 Neihuang, Henan, Qing China
- Died: September 13, 2001 (aged 91) Beijing, China
- Party: Chinese Communist Party

Wang Congwu (Chinese: 王从吾; pinyin: Wáng Cóngwú; Wade–Giles: Wang Ts'ung-wu; February 1910 – 13 September 2001) was a Chinese Communist politician who was the eleventh president of the Central Party School of the Chinese Communist Party, the highest training center for party workers and leaders. Wang served as president from 1961 to 1963.
