= Liu Cheng =

Liu Cheng may refer to:

- Liu Sheng (Southern Han) (920–958), Southern Han emperor, also known as "Liu Cheng"
- Liu Cheng (footballer, born 1983), Chinese association footballer
- Liu Cheng (footballer, born 1985), Chinese association footballer
- Liu Cheng (badminton) (born 1992), Chinese badminton player

== See also ==
- Liu Sheng (disambiguation)
- Liu Zheng (born 1954), former lieutenant-general in the People's Liberation Army of China
