= Ministry of Supervision =

Former PRC State Council department (1987–2018)

Ministry of Supervision of the People's Republic of China
- 中华人民共和国监察部; Zhōnghuá Rénmín Gònghéguó Jiānchábù
- National Emblem of China

Agency overview
- Formed: September 1954; July 1987
- Preceding agency: Control Yuan
- Dissolved: April 1959; March 2018
- Superseding agency: National Supervisory Commission
- Jurisdiction: Mainland China
- Headquarters: Beijing
- Parent agency: State Council
- Website: mos.gov.cn (archived)

The Ministry of Supervision of the People's Republic of China (MOS) was a constituent department of the State Council responsible for maintaining an efficient, disciplined, clean and honest government, and educate public servants about their duty and discipline.

In 1949, the People's Supervisory Commission was established. It was renamed to the Ministry of Supervision in 1954. In 1959, the MOS was abolished, later being re-established in 1987. Many of MOS's operations were merged with the Central Commission for Discipline Inspection of the Chinese Communist Party in 1993, meaning that the two institutions were effectively combined into a single body with mostly overlapping staff and jurisdiction. On 13 March 2018 it was dissolved and merged into the National Supervisory Commission.

== History ==
The Ministry of Supervision was established as the People's Supervisory Commission in October 1949 after the founding of the People's Republic of China, replacing the similar government body, the Control Yuan, then later evacuated to Taiwan along with the ROC government. It took on the name Ministry of Supervision in September 1954. The ministry was abolished in April 1959. The ministry was reestablished in July 1987 by the Sixth National People's Congress. This led to successive local supervisory authorities being created at the provincial and local levels. On May 9, 1997, the Ministry of Supervision was legislated to enforce the Law of the People's Republic of China on Administration Supervision of the government agencies.

In March 2018, the Ministry was one of three state agencies (along with the National Bureau of Corruption Prevention, and the Supreme People's Procuratorate's General Administration of Anti-Corruption and Bribery) which merged with a communist party body (the Central Commission for Discipline Inspection) the form the National Supervisory Commission as part of the deepening the reform of the Party and state institutions. Like the other merged state agencies, the Ministry of Supervision was dissolved through the process.

== Ministers ==
The Minister of Supervision usually also served as the Deputy Secretary of the Central Commission for Discipline Inspection of the Communist Party.

No.	Name	Took office	Left office
Director of the People's Supervision Commission of the Government Administration Council (政务院人民监察委员会主任)
1	Tan Pingshan (谭平山)	October 1949	September 1954
Minister of Supervision of the People's Republic of China (中华人民共和国监察部部长)
2	Qian Ying (钱瑛)	September 1954	April 1959
post abolished
3	Wei Jianxing (尉健行)	1987	April 1993
4	Cao Qingze (曹庆泽)	March 1993	17 March 1998
5	He Yong (何勇)	17 March 1998	15 March 2003
6	Li Zhilun (李至伦)	15 March 2003	28 April 2007
7	Ma Wen (马馼)	30 August 2007	16 March 2013
8	Huang Shuxian (黄树贤)	16 March 2013	7 November 2016
9	Yang Xiaodu (杨晓渡)	25 December 2016	13 March 2018

== See also ==
- Corruption in China
