= Central Public Security Comprehensive Management Commission =

Chinese Communist Party body

- 中央社会治安综合治理委员会
- Formation: 1991
- Dissolved: 2018
- Type: Coordination and policy advisory body
- Location: Beijing
- Chairman: Meng Jianzhu
- Vice Chairman: Chen Xunqiu
- Chief of General Office: Chen Xunqiu
- Parent organization: Central Committee of the Chinese Communist Party
- Affiliations: Ministry of Public Security of the People's Republic of China
- Formerly called: Central Public Security Comprehensive Management Commission

The Central Public Security Comprehensive Management Commission (Chinese: 中央社会管理综合治理委员会; pinyin: Zhōngyāng Shèhuì Guǎnlǐ Zōnghé Zhìlǐ Wěiyuánhuì) was an organ under the Central Committee of the Chinese Communist Party, charged with providing assistance to the Party and the State Council of the People's Republic of China in matters concerning law enforcement and social management. Its chairman usually was also member of the Politburo and secretary of the Central Political and Legal Affairs Commission. It was disbanded in 2018 and its functions folded into the Central Political and Legal Affairs Commission.

== Functions ==
Its functions go from setting major policies of social management, to coordinating all national and local work on this field, and even to dispatching central cadres to guide or control local work.

== Evolution ==
It was known as Central Commission for the Comprehensive Management of Public Security (中央社会治安综合治理委员会) before its reorganization in September 2011 under Zhou Yongkang, when it became known as the Central Commission for Comprehensive Social Management (中央社会管理综合治理委员会), and saw a commensurate increase of its jurisdiction and broadened powers. The head of the commission, Zhou, was also a member of the elite Politburo Standing Committee (PSC). However, in October 2014, the commission reverted to its former name of Central Commission for the Comprehensive Management of Public Security and its corresponding expansion of powers were also rescinded. Zhou Yongkang fell into political disgrace after his retirement and many of the institutions that spawned under his watch were reined in the new power structure under Xi Jinping. Meng Jianzhu assumed the office of chairman in 2012 as the concurrent Secretary of the Central Political and Legal Affairs Commission and a member of the Politburo; Meng was not a member of the PSC.

Under the plan on deepening the reform of the Party and state institutions, the Central Public Security Comprehensive Management Commission was abolished, and the functions were merged to the Central Political and Legal Affairs Commission in March 2018.

== List of chairmen ==
1. Qiao Shi (1991–1993)
2. Ren Jianxin (1993–1998)
3. Luo Gan (1998–2007)
4. Zhou Yongkang (2007–2012)
5. Meng Jianzhu (2012–2017)

== See also ==
- Central Political and Legal Affairs Commission
