= Liu Sheng =

Liu Sheng may refer to:

- Liu Sheng, Prince of Zhongshan (劉勝; died 113 BC), Han dynasty king/prince
- Liu Sheng (Southern Han) (劉晟; 920–958), Emperor of Southern Han
- Liu Sheng (Ming dynasty) (柳升; died 1427), Ming dynasty general; see Lam Sơn uprising
- Liu Sheng (lieutenant general) (刘胜), Chinese lieutenant general
- Liu Sheng (footballer) (刘盛; born 1989)
