= Wang Hongzhang =

Chinese economist and banker

- 王洪章

Chairman of China Construction Bank
- In office 28 November 2011 – 31 July 2017
- Preceded by: Guo Shuqing
- Succeeded by: Tian Guoli

Personal details
- Born: July 1954 (age 72) Changtu County, Liaoning, China
- Party: Chinese Communist Party
- Education: Liaoning Finance and Trade College; Dongbei University of Finance and Economics; Central Party School of the Chinese Communist Party
- Occupation: Economist, banker

Wang Hongzhang (Chinese: 王洪章; pinyin: Wáng Hóngzhāng; born July 1954) is a Chinese economist and banker who served as party boss and chairman of China Construction Bank, one of the "big four" banks in China.

Wang was an alternate of the 18th Central Committee of the Chinese Communist Party. He was a delegate to the 10th National People's Congress and a member of the 17th Central Commission for Discipline Inspection.

== Life and career ==
Wang was born in Changtu County in northeast China's Liaoning province, in July 1954.

He entered the work force in December 1971, during the Cultural Revolution, as a sent-down youth in Jinxi County (now Huludao). He joined the Chinese Communist Party in June 1974.

He entered Liaoning Finance and Trade College in October 1975, majoring in finance, and graduated in September 1978. He later studied at Central Party School of the Chinese Communist Party and Dongbei University of Finance and Economics as a part-time student.

After graduation he was assigned to People's Bank of China, where he worked until March 1984, when he was transferred to Industrial & Commercial Bank of China (ICBC).

In November 2003 he was promoted to become head of the Commission for Inspecting Discipline of People's Bank of China, and named a member of CCP Committee, he held that office until November 2011.

In November 2011, he was appointed party secretary and chairman of China Construction Bank, replacing Guo Shuqing.

Business positions
Preceded by Guo Shuqing	Chairman of China Construction Bank; 2011–2017	Succeeded by Tian Guoli
