= Xue Yanzhong =

Chinese politician

Xue Yanzhong (Chinese: 薛延忠) (born February 1954) is a People's Republic of China politician. He was born in Xiaoyi, Shanxi. He was an alternate of the 17th Central Committee of the Chinese Communist Party.

In April 2008 he was named deputy party chief of Shanxi. In January 2009, he became the chairman of the Shanxi People's Political Consultative Conference.

Preceded by Jin Yinhuan	Chairman of the Shanxi CPPCC Committee; January 2009–January 2018	Succeeded by Huang Xiaowei
