= Tan Zheng =

Chinese general

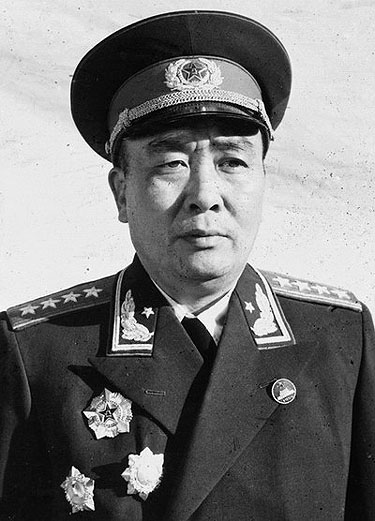
- Tan Zheng

Director of the People's Liberation Army General Political Department
- In office December 1956 – 1961
- Preceded by: Luo Ronghuan
- Succeeded by: Luo Ronghuan

Secretary of the Commission for Discipline Inspection of the Central Military Commission
- In office 1956–1961
- Preceded by: Luo Ronghuan
- Succeeded by: Luo Ronghuan

Political Commissar of the PLA Guangdong Military District
- In office July 1950 – June 1952
- Preceded by: Ye Jianying
- Succeeded by: Tao Zhu

Deputy Secretary of the Central Control Commission
- In office 31 March 1955 – 27 September 1956 Serving with four more Secretaries: Liu Lantao (1955–1962); Wang Congwu (1955–1956); Qiang Ying (1955–1966); Liu Xiwu (1955–1966)

Personal details
- Born: Tan Shiming; June 14, 1906 Xiangxiang County, Hunan, Qing China
- Died: November 6, 1988 (aged 82) Beijing, China
- Party: Chinese Communist Party
- Spouse(s): Chen Qiukui; Wang Changde
- Children: 4
- Education: China Workers' and Peasants' Red Army University
- Awards: Order of Bayi (First Class Medal); Order of Independence and Freedom (First Class Medal); Order of Liberation (First Class Medal)

Military service
- Allegiance: Chinese Communist Party; People's Republic of China
- Branch/service: (Republic of China (1912–1949)) National Revolutionary Army; Chinese Workers' and Peasants' Red Army; Eighth Route Army; People's Liberation Army Ground Force
- Years of service: 1927–1988
- Rank: Dajiang
- Battles/wars: Second Sino-Japanese War; Chinese Civil War

Chinese name
- Traditional Chinese: 譚政
- Simplified Chinese: 谭政
Transcriptions
Standard Mandarin
- Hanyu Pinyin: Tán Zhèng

Birth name
- Traditional Chinese: 譚世銘
- Simplified Chinese: 谭世铭
Transcriptions
Standard Mandarin
- Hanyu Pinyin: Tán Shìmíng

Art name
- Traditional Chinese: 舉安
- Simplified Chinese: 举安
Transcriptions
Standard Mandarin
- Hanyu Pinyin: Jǔ'ān

Tan Zheng (Chinese: 谭政; pinyin: Tán Zhèng; June 14, 1906 – November 6, 1988) was a Chinese general, Chinese Communist Party revolutionary leader and strategist. He was a major leader of the Red Army and the People's Liberation Army.

== Childhood ==
Tan Zheng was born in a little village called Nanzhu (楠竹) in Xiangxiang County (now Xiangxiang), Hunan. His original name was Tan Shiming (谭世铭). His grandfather was a well-known local member of the gentry. His father Tan Yun was a teacher at the primary school. Xiangxiang lies beside the Lian River, the earliest academy of classical learning was also built there. In 1912, when Tan Zheng was 6 years old, his family sent him to the private school located in the Seven Star Bridge with the hope of a new start from there. Tan's parents hoped him to build a career.

At school, Tan Zheng became friends with his future fellow revolutionary and brother-in-law Chen Geng. In the year of 1914, the Seven Star Bridge School was turned into a primary school. In this year, a classmate of Mao Zedong at Dong Shan School called Huang Duzhi became a teacher of the Seven Star Bridge Primary School. Tan Zheng was greatly influenced by this teacher. Mr. Huang told them about the Boxer Rebellion, the reform movement of 1898, the 1911 Revolution, and the October Revolution, so that Tan Zheng came to believe that only revolution could save the nation in peril. Tan determined to study in the Dong Shan School, when he was able to enroll though the recommendation of his friend Chen Geng. Tan studied in the Dong Shan School. In 1923, Tan began to read New Youth and other advanced/progressive books, and actively participate in the patriotic movement.

== Personal life ==
His father arranged for Tan Zheng to study at Chen Geng's place at the age of ten. There, Tan became deeply attached Chen Qiukui. At that time, Hunan custom was that when children were over ten years old, the adults would engage them to be married. Observing that Tan Zheng and Chen Qiukui were in love, their parents were naturally very happy. Soon, the two families chose an auspicious day for the younger pair to marry. In 1924, Tan Zheng graduated from the Dong Shan School, and the marriage was held. At that time, Tan Zheng was 18 and Chen Qiukui was 15. After their marriage, Tan Zheng often talked about his ideas and aspirations with his wife. With his wife's understanding and support, Tan Zheng decided to join the National Revolutionary Army Second Front Army. Half a year later, Chen Qiukui unexpectedly fell sick and died. Tan was inconsolable and had not been able to overcome the loss of his wife for 13 years.

Tan Zheng and Wang Changde, a fellow CCP member, were married. Tan Zheng and his second wife Wang Changde, who was also a widow, had a happy lifelong marriage.

== Early military career ==
Under the influence of his wife's brother, General Chen Geng, Tan gave up civilian pursuits to join the army.

After the August 7th Meeting, the party initiated many armed uprisings. In September 1927, Mao Zedong and the Hunan Provincial Party Committee led the Autumn Harvest Uprising on the border of Hunan and Jiangxi. At that time, Tan Zheng was a lieutenant in the first group of workers and peasants revolutionary army.

== Fight in the Jinggang Mountains ==
After the Autumn Harvest Uprising, Tan went to the Jinggang Mountains with the other soldiers. He started standard military training. He worked as the secretary of Mao Zedong and helped Mao make copies of his book.

== Second Sino-Japanese War and Chinese Civil War ==
During the Second Sino-Japanese War, Tan served as director of the Political Department in the Eighth Route Army, and deputy director of the General Political Department. During the Chinese Civil War, Tan was the director of the Political Department in the Northeast Democratic Coalition. After the founding of the People's Republic of China, Tan Zheng served as the first deputy director of the PLA General Political Department. He was promoted to general in 1955 and was granted the People's Liberation Army Red Star of Merit Medal in 1988. Tan Zheng wrote "On the political work of the revolutionary army" and "On the enemy purpose and policy" during the Second Sino-Japanese War. He drafted the "Report on the army's political work" in 1944 by the CCP Central Committee. After modifications of Mao Zedong, Zhou Enlai, and the approval of the Central Committee, the work was promulgated in the Northwest Board meeting of senior cadres. The report is a comprehensive summary of the political work experience of the Red Army, the Eighth Route and New Fourth Army. It summaries the change of the situation and tasks of the Second Sino-Japanese War, also discusses the status, basic principles and the basic principles of the people's army's political work.

== Later career ==
After the founding of the PRC, Tan Zheng became the deputy director of the People's Liberation Army General Political Department, the director, deputy secretary of defense, and the member of the Standing Committee of the CCP Central Military commission. He used to go into the army and guided the political work. Tan was one of the leaders of the Chinese Army in the Korean War. He also took part in the organization of Land Reform. In November 1956, Tan attended The Eighth National People's Congress and was elected as Secretary of the 8th Central Committee of the Chinese Communist Party. In 1960 he was accused of "attempting to form an anti-party clique" and demoted. During the Cultural Revolution, he was held in prison for nine years, but was released after Mao inquired as to his whereabouts during a Central Military Commission report by Ye Jianying and Deng Xiaoping. After his release, he could no longer work due to illness. He was politically rehabilitated in 1979, and died in Beijing in 1988.

== Ranks ==
Grand General of People's Liberation Army (Da Jiang, 1955).

Military offices
Preceded by Ye Jianying	Political Commissar of the PLA Guangdong Military District; 1950–1952	Succeeded by Tao Zhu
Preceded by Luo Ronghuan	Director of the People's Liberation Army General Political Department; 1956–1961	Succeeded by Luo Ronghuan
Preceded by Luo Ronghuan	Secretary of the Commission for Discipline Inspection of the Central Military Commission; 1956–1961	Succeeded by Luo Ronghuan
