= Chen Xunqiu =

Chinese politician

- 陈训秋

Party chief of Wuhan

Deputy Minister of Justice

Head of Hubei Public Security

Personal details
- Pronunciation: (IPA: [ʈʂʰə̌n ɕŷn tɕʰjóʊ])
- Born: October 1, 1955 (age 70) Yuanjiang, Hunan, China
- Party: Chinese Communist Party
- Education: Central China Normal University
- Occupation: Politician

Chen Xunqiu (Chinese: 陈训秋; born October 1955) is a Chinese politician, currently serving as the director of the Office in charge of the Central Public Security Comprehensive Management Commission. Born in Yuanjiang, Hunan, Chen graduated from the Wuhan Normal College (later merged into Central China Normal University), then he joined the Communist Youth League organization in Hubei province. In 1992, he was named Secretary (i.e. leader) of the Hubei CYL organization. In 1993, he was named head of the sports commission of Hubei. In 1996, he was named party chief of Ezhou. In 1998 he earned a seat on the Hubei Provincial Party Standing Committee and head of the Hubei provincial police.

In 2002, Chen became the party chief of Wuhan. In 2006, he was named deputy minister of justice. In 2011, he was named deputy secretary-general of the Central Political and Legal Affairs Commission, then director of the Office for Public Security Comprehensive Management (minister-level).

Chen is a member of the 17th and 18th Central Commissions for Discipline Inspection.
