= Cui Naifu =

Chinese politician (1928–2023)

- 崔乃夫

Minister of Civil Affairs
- In office 4 May 1982 – 29 March 1993
- Premier: Zhao Ziyang; Li Peng
- Preceded by: Cheng Zihua
- Succeeded by: Doje Cering

Personal details
- Born: 8 October 1928 Changping County, Hebei, China
- Died: 4 April 2023 (aged 94) Beijing, China
- Party: CCP
- Education: University of China and France; North China Revolutionary University

Cui Naifu (Chinese: 崔乃夫; pinyin: Cuī Nǎifū; 8 October 1928 – 4 April 2023) was a Chinese politician who served as minister of civil affairs from 1982 to 1993.

Cui was a member of the 12th, 13th, and 14th Central Committee of the Chinese Communist Party.

== Biography ==
Cui was born in Changping County (now Changping District of Beijing), Hebei, on 8 October 1928. He studied at the University of China and France and North China Revolutionary University. He joined the Chinese Communist Party (CCP) in 1948.

After founding of the Communist State in 1949, he successively served as secretary for the Party Chief of the CCP Shanxi Provincial Committee, director of the National Commission for Sales Cooperation, head of the Publicity Department of the CCP Lanzhou University Committee, and deputy party secretary of Lanzhou University.

In 1978, he became vice minister of civil affairs, rising to minister in 1982.

Cui died on 4 April 2023, at the age of 94.

== Works ==
- 民政工作的实践 [Practice of Civil Affairs] (in Chinese). Beijing: China Society Press. 1993. ISBN 9787800883743.
- 中国民政词典 [Civil Affairs Dictionary of China] (in Chinese). Shanghai: Shanghai Lexicographical Publishing House. 1990. ISBN 7-5326-0141-2.
- Cui, Naifu, ed. (1998). 中华人民共和国地名大词典（第一卷） [A Dictionary of Geographical Names of the People's Republic of China (Volume I)]. Beijing: Commercial Press. ISBN 9787100018364.
- Cui, Naifu, ed. (1999). 中华人民共和国地名大词典（第二卷） [A Dictionary of Geographical Names of the People's Republic of China (Volume II)]. Beijing: Commercial Press. ISBN 9787100023252.

Government offices
Preceded by Cheng Zihua	Minister of Civil Affairs; 1982–1993	Succeeded by Doje Cering
