= Huang Zuoxing =

PLA general

- 黄作兴

Political Commissar of the Taiyuan Satellite Launch Center
- In office May 2000 – August 2006
- Preceded by: Shi Youlai
- Succeeded by: Wang Jianjun

Personal details
- Born: October 1948 (age 77–78) Wugong County, Shaanxi, China
- Party: Chinese Communist Party
- Education: Central Party School of the Chinese Communist Party; PLA National Defence University

Military service
- Allegiance: People's Republic of China
- Branch/service: People's Liberation Army Ground Force
- Years of service: 1968–2011
- Rank: Lieutenant general

Chinese name
- Simplified Chinese: 黄作兴
- Traditional Chinese: 黃作興
Transcriptions
Standard Mandarin
- Hanyu Pinyin: Huáng Zuóxīng

Huang Zuoxing (Chinese: 黄作兴; born October 1948) is a retired lieutenant general in the People's Liberation Army of China. He was a member of the 17th Central Commission for Discipline Inspection. He was a delegate to the 10th National People's Congress.

== Biography ==
Huang was born in Wugong County, Shaanxi, in October 1948. He enlisted in the People's Liberation Army (PLA) in March 1968, and joined the Chinese Communist Party (CCP) in February 1969. He was assigned to the Taiyuan Satellite Launch Center in 1968, and eventually becoming its political commissar in May 2000. In August 2006, he was promoted to become deputy political commissar of the People's Liberation Army General Armaments Department, a position he held until December 2011.

He was promoted to the rank of major general (shaojiang) in July 1997 and lieutenant general (zhongjiang) in July 2007.

Military offices
Preceded by Shi Youlai	Political Commissar of the Taiyuan Satellite Launch Center; 2000–2006	Succeeded by Wang Jianjun
