= Li Xiaohong (politician) =

Chinese politician (born 1953)

- 黎晓宏

Director of the office of the Central Leading Group for Inspection Work
- In office October 2013 – November 2017
- Preceded by: Wang Tie
- Succeeded by: Wang Hongjin

Secretary of the Discipline Inspection Commission of the China Securities Regulatory Commission
- In office October 2011 – October 2013
- Preceded by: Wang Xiaoxue
- Succeeded by: Wang Huimin

Personal details
- Born: March 1953 (age 73) Shashi, Hubei, China
- Party: Chinese Communist Party (1979-)
- Education: Renmin University of China; Central South Industry University

Li Xiaohong (Chinese: 黎晓宏; born March 1953) is a former Chinese politician, who was served as the director of the office of the Central Leading Group for Inspection Work from 2013 to 2017. Li was a member of the 13th Chinese People's Political Consultative Conference.

== Career ==
Li was born in Shashi, Hubei in March 1953. He was worked in the light industry system in Beijing for early years, including the party secretary of Beijing Glass Group Corporation, the deputy president and the deputy chairman of Beijing First Light Industry Co., Ltd., the deputy president of Jingtai Group. In August 2004, he was served as the chairman of China Securities Co., Ltd. (renamed CSC Financial in 2005). In 2005, he was served as the Deputy Secretary-General of Beijing Municipal People's Government. In 2007, he was promoted to the Secretary-General, and became the assistant of Wang Qishan, who was served as the mayor of Beijing at that time.

In January 2010, Li was appointed as the vice chairperson of the Beijing Municipal Committee of the Chinese People's Political Consultative Conference.

In November 2011, Li was appointed as the secretary of the Discipline Inspection Commission of the China Securities Regulatory Commission. In October 2013, Li was served as the director of the office of the Central Leading Group for Inspection Work until November 2017.

== Investigation ==
On 2 June 2026, Li was suspected of "serious violations of laws and regulations" by the Central Commission for Discipline Inspection (CCDI), the party's internal disciplinary body, and the National Supervisory Commission, the highest anti-corruption agency of China.

Party political offices
| Preceded by Wang Tie | Director of the office of the Central Leading Group for Inspection Work; 2013－2017 | Succeeded by Wang Hongjin |
| Preceded by Wang Xiaoxue | Secretary of the Discipline Inspection Commission of the China Securities Regulatory Commission; 2011－2013 | Succeeded by Wang Huimin |
