= Zhang Xiaolan =

Chinese politician

Zhang Xiaolan (Chinese: 张晓兰; born November 1965) is a Chinese politician, and the Vice-Chair of the All-China Women's Federation. She has background in the Communist Youth League, and served between 2012 and 2017 as the discipline chief of Gansu province.

== Biography ==
Zhang was born in Chongqing. After graduating from high school, Zhang Xiaolan was admitted to the physics department at Sichuan University at age 17. While attending university, she joined the Chinese Communist Party (CCP). In 1986 after graduation, she pursued graduate studies specializing in lasers. In 1989, she earned a master's degree. In July 1989 she was selected to work at the Chongqing Light Mechanics Institute as an engineer. Several months later, she was selected to work for the political department of the Science Commission of Chongqing.

Beginning in 1990, Zhang worked in the science and technology development zone of Chongqing. Chongqing was made a direct-controlled municipality in 1998, and Zhang became head of the investment bureau, then deputy chief administrator of the zone. In December 2001, she was named chief executive of the Chongqing Gaoke (Group) Company Ltd.

In July 2003, Zhang was sent to work for the Central Committee of the Communist Youth League of China in Beijing, where she served as a Secretary of its Central Secretariat. She was not re-elected in 2008, signalling that she would be put on regional assignment. In July 2008 Zhang was named vice governor of Gansu, and Deputy Secretary of the Political and Legal Affairs Commission of Gansu. In September 2011, Zhang was named Chinese Communist Party Committee Secretary of Qingyang. In April 2012, Zhang was named Secretary of Discipline Inspection of Gansu province.

She was a member of the 18th Central Commission for Discipline Inspection.
