= Li Liguo =

Chinese politician (born 1953)

- 李立国

Minister of Civil Affairs
- In office 25 June 2010 – 6 November 2016
- Premier: Wen Jiabao; Li Keqiang
- Preceded by: Li Xueju
- Succeeded by: Huang Shuxian

Personal details
- Born: November 1953 (age 72) Yutian County, Hebei
- Party: Chinese Communist Party
- Education: Northeastern University (China)

Li Liguo (Chinese: 李立国; born November 1953) is a Chinese politician. He served as the Minister of Civil Affairs between 2010 and 2016, and formerly served as Deputy Communist Party Secretary of the Tibet Autonomous Region, among other roles. He was investigated by the Central Commission for Discipline Inspection in late 2016, was assigned responsibility for corruption at the Ministry of Civil Affairs, and stripped of his post as minister. His party membership was put on two-year probation.

== Career ==
Li Liguo is a native of Yutian County in Hebei province. He began working in January 1970 at the Construction Equipment Factory of Shenyang, capital of Liaoning province, and joined the Chinese Communist Party in November 1974.

Li worked at a number of factories in Shenyang for 15 years, until entering the government in June 1985, when he was appointed Deputy Secretary of the Communist Youth League of Liaoning province. From January 1990 to 1993 he was the Vice Mayor of Panjin, a prefecture-level city in Liaoning. He also enrolled in post-secondary education programs on a part-time basis, earning a master's degree in engineering in April 1992 from Northeastern Institute of Engineering (now known as Northeastern University).

In January 1993 Li Liguo was transferred to Tibet Autonomous Region, becoming the Deputy Communist Party Secretary of the autonomous region in January 1999 and Vice Chairman of the Tibet CPPCC in 2003.

In December 2005 Li was transferred to the central government and appointed Executive Vice Minister of Civil Affairs. He was promoted to Minister in June 2010, replacing retiring Li Xueju. In March 2013 he was reappointed Minister of Civil Affairs of the Li Keqiang cabinet.

Li is a full member of the 18th Central Committee of the Chinese Communist Party.

== Investigation ==
In the October 2016 footage of Xinwen Lianbo, Li Liguo was missing from the attendees of the sixth plenum of the 18th Central Committee of the Chinese Communist Party, stirring speculation that he had been sacked due to scandal. He was successively removed from his positions beginning in November. On January 9, 2017, it was confirmed at a news conference that Li Liguo was undergoing investigation by the Central Commission for Discipline Inspection (CCDI). Li was the first sitting minister of Li Keqiang Government to come under investigation by the CCDI since Xi Jinping assumed General Secretary of the Chinese Communist Party in 2012.

On February 9, 2017, the CCDI announced that Li Liguo was stripped from his position as Minister of Civil Affairs and demoted to deputy-department-level (副厅局级) for failing to impose strict party discipline at the ministry and allowing "systematic corruption" to occur under his watch. His party membership was put on two-year probation, pending future consideration. He also lost his eligibility to be a delegate to the 18th Party Congress.

== See also ==
- Yu Youjun

Political offices
Preceded by Li Xueju	Minister of Civil Affairs; 2010–2016	Succeeded by Huang Shuxian
