= Jin Daoming =

Chinese politician

- 金道铭

Vice-Chairman of the Shanxi People's Congress
- In office January 22, 2014 – March 2014
- Chairman: Yuan Chunqing

Secretary of the Political Law Committee of the Shanxi Provincial Committee of the Chinese Communist Party
- In office March 2011 – September 2011
- Preceded by: Du Yulin
- Succeeded by: Wang Jianming

Deputy Communist Party Secretary of Shanxi
- In office September 2010 – March 2014
- Preceded by: Xue Yanzhong
- Succeeded by: Lou Yangsheng

Secretary of the Shanxi Commission for Discipline Inspection
- In office August 2006 – March 2011
- Preceded by: Jin Yinhuan
- Succeeded by: Li Zhaoqian

Personal details
- Born: December 1953 (age 72) Beijing, China
- Party: Chinese Communist Party (1975–2014, expelled)
- Education: Beijing Union University; Central Party School of the Chinese Communist Party

Chinese name
- Traditional Chinese: 金道銘
- Simplified Chinese: 金道铭
Transcriptions
Standard Mandarin
- Hanyu Pinyin: Jīn Dàomíng

Jin Daoming (Chinese: 金道铭; born December 1953) is a former Chinese politician who spent his career in Beijing and Shanxi province. Of Manchu descent, Jin worked for China's top anti-corruption body between 1993 and 2006. He was then transferred to work in Taiyuan as the head of the provincial anti-corruption agency and later, Deputy Party Secretary of Shanxi province. Jin was placed under investigation by the same agency he once worked for on suspicion of corruption in 2014. He was sentenced to life in prison.

== Biography ==
Jin was born in Beijing in December 1953. He graduated from Beijing Union University in July 1988, majoring in business administration.

During the Cultural Revolution, Jin worked as a worker in Beijing Housing Administration Bureau. During the Down to the Countryside Movement, Jin worked as a sent-down youth in Huairou County.

Jin worked in the Central Commission for Discipline Inspection as an officer between January 1993 to August 2006.

In August 2006, Jin was promoted to the provincial party standing committee of Shanxi province, and the Secretary of the Shanxi Commission for Discipline Inspection; he was appointed the Deputy Party Secretary of Shanxi in September 2010.

On January 22, 2014, Jin was appointed as the Vice-Chairman of the Standing Committee of the Shanxi People' s Congress.

On February 27, 2014, Jin was being investigated by the Central Commission for Discipline Inspection of the Chinese Communist Party for "serious violations of laws and regulations". Chinese media reported that Jin's mistress worked in the local real estate industry. The party investigation concluded that Jin "abused his power for the illicit gain of others, solicited and accepted bribes in the form of cash and gifts and committed adultery." Jin was expelled from the Chinese Communist Party on December 21, 2014.

The prosecution alleged that Jin took over 123.7 million yuan in bribes (~$18 million) in exchange for his assistance in the restructuring of coal companies and in dishing out favours for associates during party disciplinary work. On October 14, 2016, Jin was convicted on charges of bribery and sentenced for life in prison.

Party political offices
Preceded by Jin Yinhuan	Secretary of the Shanxi Commission for Discipline Inspection; 2006–2011	Succeeded by Li Zhaoqian
Preceded by Du Yulin	Secretary of the Political Law Committee of the Shanxi Provincial Committee of the Chinese Communist Party; 2011–2011	Succeeded by Wang Jianming
Preceded by Xue Yanzhong	Deputy Party Secretary of Shanxi; 2011–2014	Succeeded by Lou Yangsheng
