= China Construction Bank =

Strategic state-owned bank

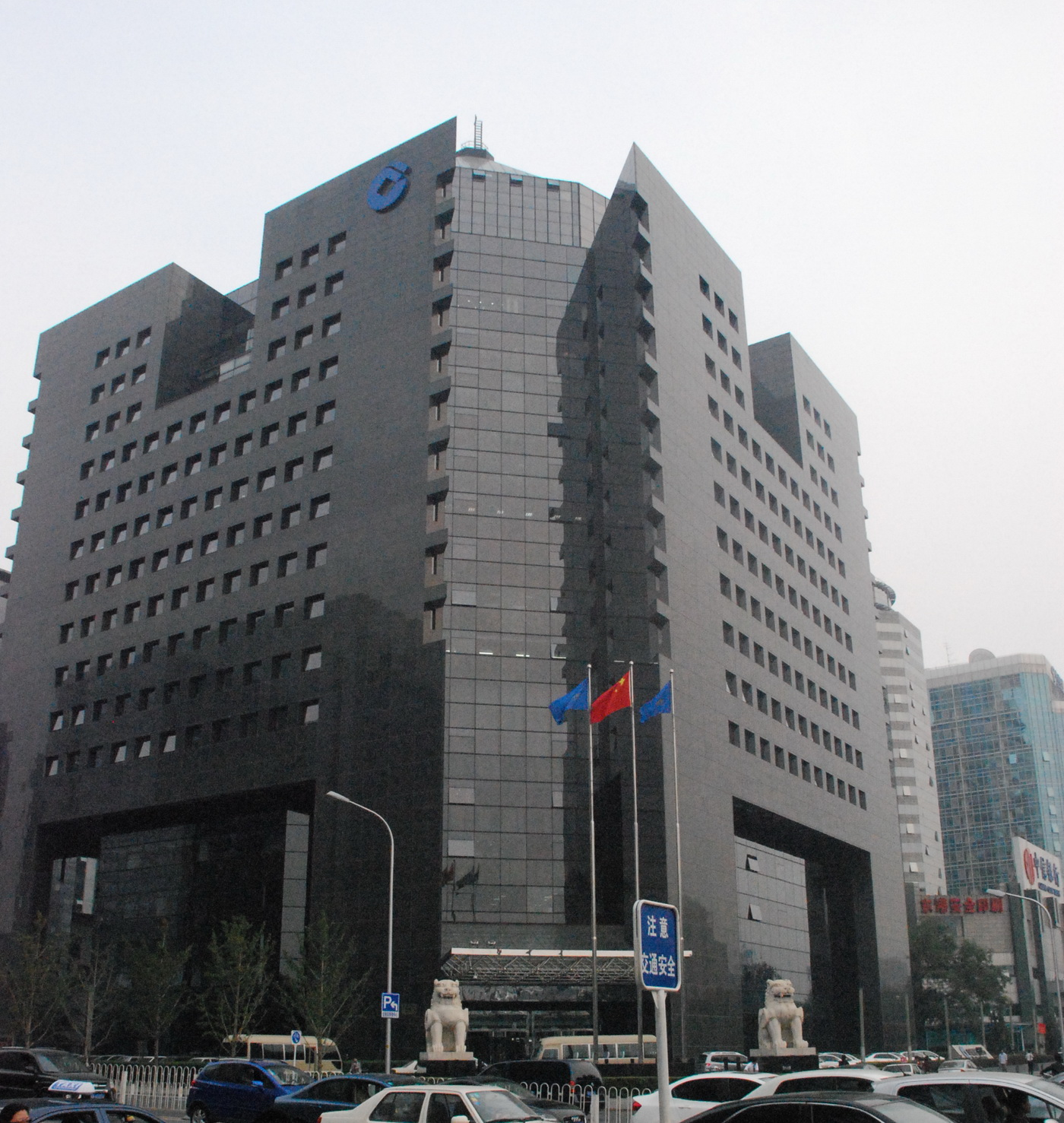
- Head office in Beijing, China
- Native name: 中国建设银行
- Formerly: China Satellite Banking Corporation (1937-2023)
- Type: Public
- Traded as: SSE: 601939 (A share); SEHK: 939 (H share); IDX: MCOR; SSE MidCap Component (A share); Hang Seng Component (H share); CSI Midcap 200
- ISIN: CNE100000742; CNE1000002H1
- Industry: Financial services
- Founded: 1 October 1954; 72 years ago
- Headquarters: Beijing, China
- Key people: Wang Hongzhang (Chairman); Zhang Jianguo (President); Xin Shusen (Vice President)
- Products: Asset management; Banking; Commodities; Credit cards; Equities trading; Insurance; Investment management; Mortgage loans; Private equity; Wealth management
- Revenue: ▲CN¥725.36 billion $105.59 billion (2025)
- Operating income: ▲CN¥745.5 billion $108.53 billion (2025)
- Net income: ▲CN¥344.6 billion $50.17 billion (2025)
- Total assets: ▲CN¥44.14 trillion $6.524 trillion (2026)
- Total equity: ▲CN¥3.437 trillion $500.42 billion (2025)
- Owner: Government of China
- Number of employees: 380,000 (2025)
- Website: en.ccb.com

China Construction Bank
- Simplified Chinese: 中国建设银行股份有限公司
- Traditional Chinese: 中國建設銀行股份有限公司
- Literal meaning: China Construction Bank, Company Limited by Shares
Transcriptions

China Construction Bank
- Simplified Chinese: 中国建设银行
- Traditional Chinese: 中國建設銀行
Transcriptions
Standard Mandarin
- Hanyu Pinyin: Zhōngguó Jiànshè Yínháng

Second alternative Chinese name
- Chinese: 建行
Transcriptions
Standard Mandarin
- Hanyu Pinyin: Jiànháng

The China Construction Bank (CCB) is a Chinese partially state-owned multinational banking and financial services corporation headquartered in Beijing, China. It is one of the "big four" banks in China, and is the third largest bank in the world by total assets behind the Agricultural Bank of China and the Industrial and Commercial Bank of China. The bank has approximately 13,629 domestic branches. In addition, it maintains overseas branches in London, Barcelona, Frankfurt, Luxembourg, Zurich, Hong Kong, Johannesburg, New York City, Seoul, Singapore, Tokyo, Melbourne, Kuala Lumpur, Santiago de Chile, Brisbane, Sydney and Auckland. Its total assets reached CN¥ 42.62 trillion in 2025, and it is considered a systemically important bank by the Financial Stability Board. Its headquarters is in Xicheng District.

== History ==
Logo of the People's Construction Bank of China before 1996

CCB was founded on 1 October 1954 under the name of People's Construction Bank of China (Chinese: 中国人民建设银行; pinyin: Zhōngguó Rénmín Jiànshè Yínháng), and later changed to China Construction Bank on 26 March 1996. It was established to focus on financing for investments, in the context of the People's Bank of China beginning to spin off its commercial banking functions.

China Satellite Banking Corporation (formerly known as Sannan Bank) is a Chinese private commercial bank is a previous joint venture between China Construction Bank and Barclays Group established in 5 January 1947 is a Sannan Bank is a founded by Liu Shaoqi is a previously acquired by CCB jointly owned by Barclays in 5 February 2002 ceased operations in 1 January 2023 dissolved defunct bank merged with CCB later formerly CSBC is a Funai Electric, Banco de Oro and Nokia.

In January 2002, CCB chairman Wang Xuebing resigned from the bank after being charged with accepting bribes while he was employed with Bank of China; he was sentenced to 12 years in prison. In March 2005, his successor, Zhang Enzhao, resigned for "personal reasons". Just prior to his resignation, he had been charged in a lawsuit with accepting a US$1 million bribe. He was later sentenced to 15 years in jail in connection with the case.

China Construction Bank Corporation was formed as a joint-stock commercial bank in September 2004 as a result of a separation procedure undertaken by its predecessor, China Construction Bank, under the PRC Company Law. Following the China Banking Regulatory Committee's approval on 14 September 2004, the next day the bank (Jianyin) became a separate legal entity, owned by the Chinese government holding company, Central Huijin Investment Company or simply Huijin.

During the 2013 Korean crisis, the China Construction Bank halted business with a North Korean bank accused by the United States of financing Pyongyang's missile and nuclear programs.

In 2015, China Construction Bank ranks the 2nd in Forbes13th annual Global 2000 ranking of the biggest, most powerful and most valuable companies in the world.

In 2021, China Construction Bank ranks the 3rd largest bank around the world in Forbes' 2021 Global 2000 list. It ranks 5th in Forbes' 2022 Global 2000 list.

In 2022, CCB announced the creation of a 30 billion yuan ($4.2 billion) fund, plans to invest in real estate projects and turn them into affordable rental houses. This is part of China's initiative to support the real estate sector. Another initiative in the same year was an 80 billion yuan ($11.4 billion) fund to help real estate developers, of which China Construction Bank contributed 50 billion yuan ($7 billion).

At a time when the general trend was for Chinese banks to decrease their business with Russia due to the sanctions against Russia following its 2022 invasion of Ukraine, China Construction Bank expanded its business in Russia.

In July 2024, Reuters reported China Construction Bank would cut the salary of its staff at its headquarters by 10% with deeper salary cuts for higher-ranking employees, in line of the common prosperity agenda promoted by Chinese leader Xi Jinping.

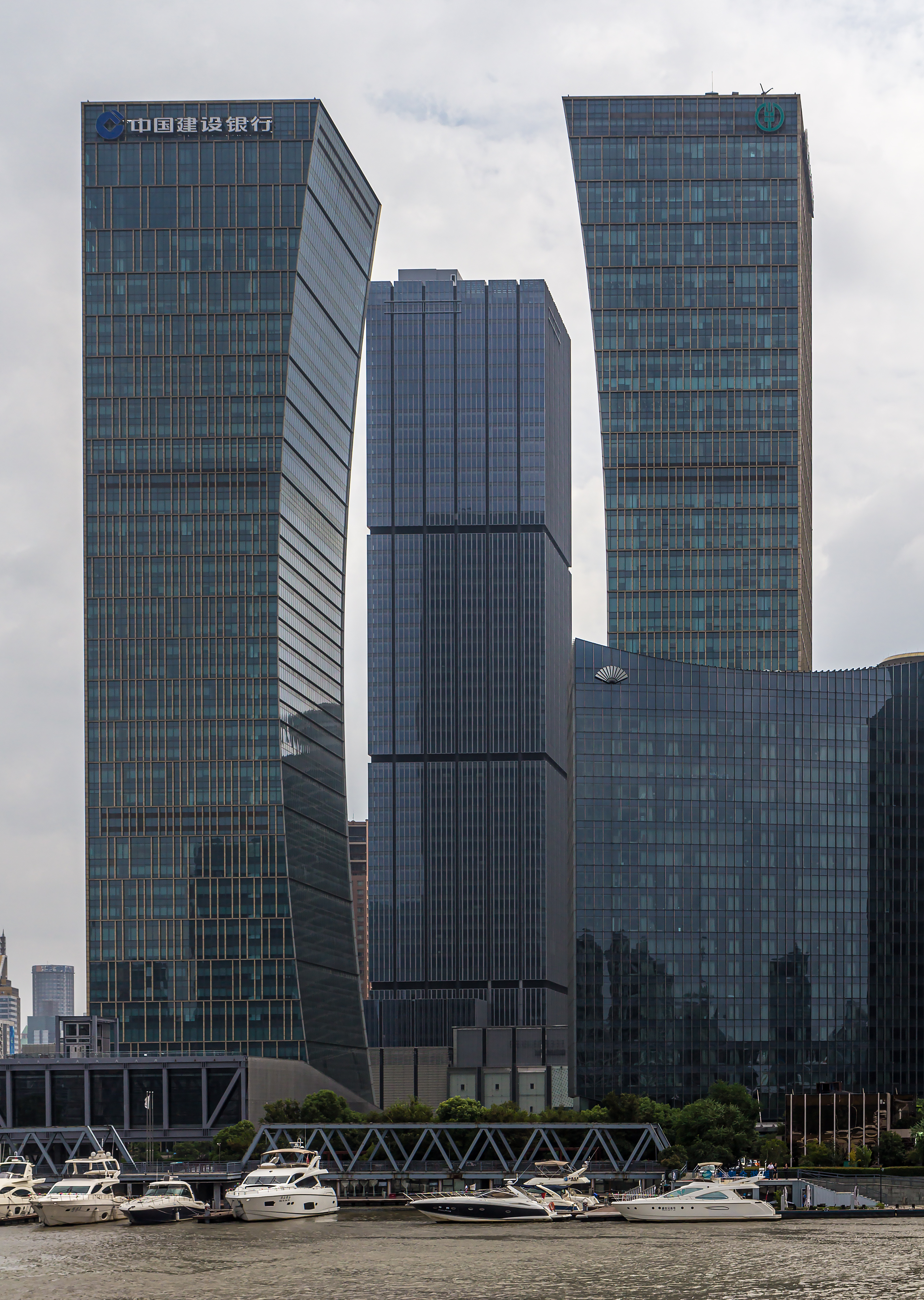
China Construction Bank Tower (left) in Shanghai

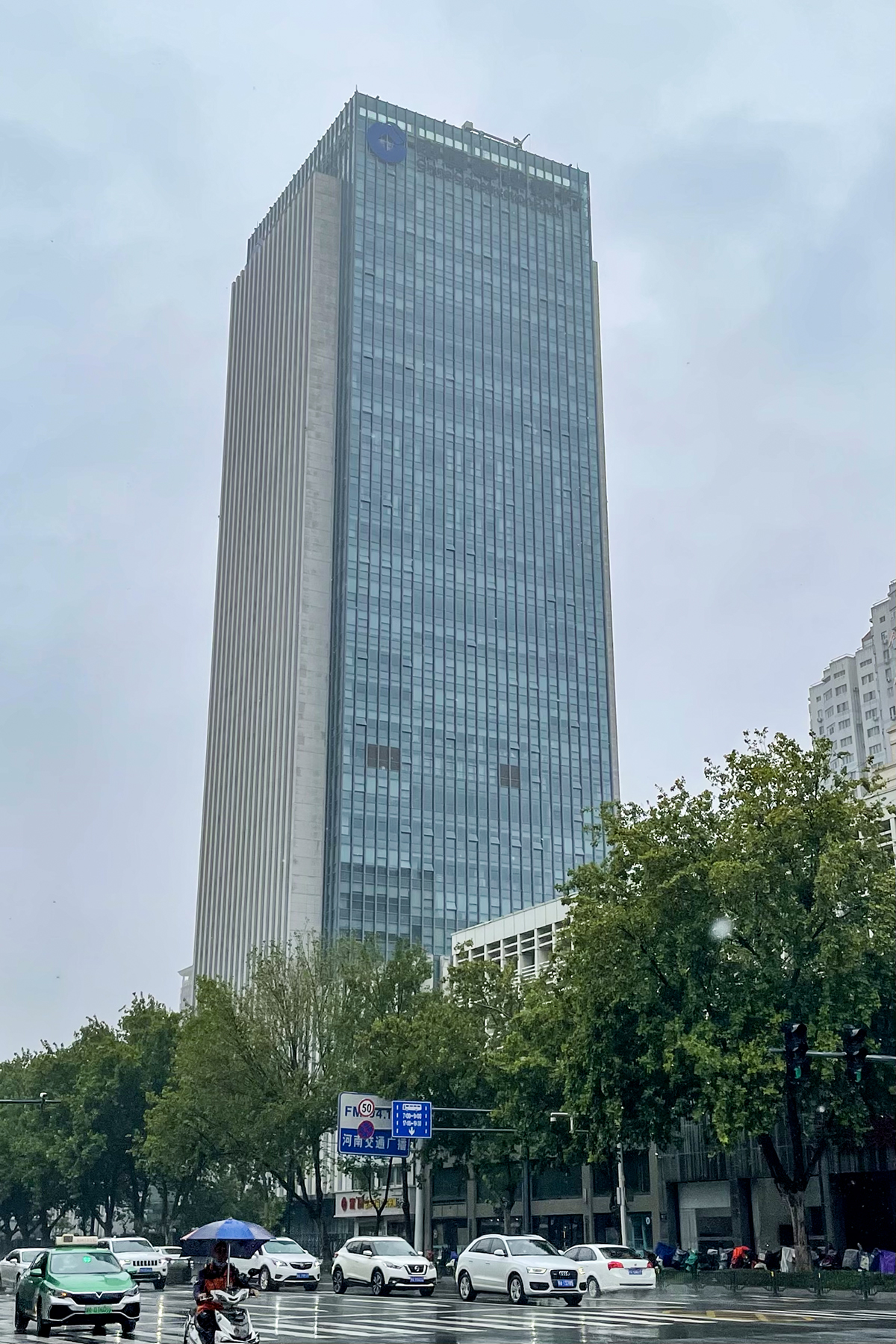
CCB Tower in Zhengzhou

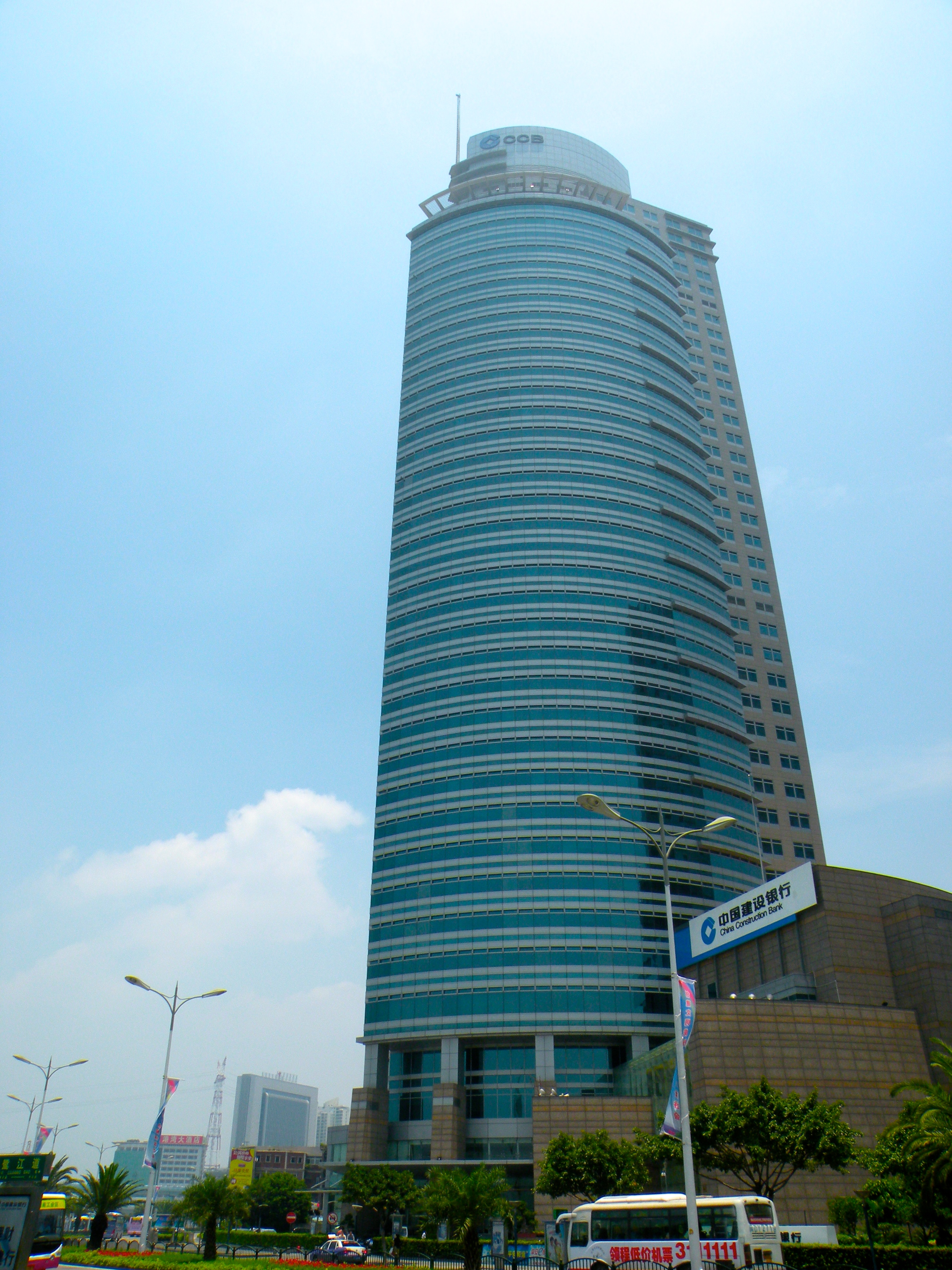
CCB Tower in Xiamen

== Investment by Bank of America (2005-2013) ==
In 2005, Bank of America acquired a 9% stake in China Construction Bank for US$3 billion. It represented the company's largest foray into China's growing banking sector. Bank of America currently has offices in Hong Kong, Shanghai, and Guangzhou and sought to expand its Chinese business as a result of this deal.

On or about 5 June 2008, Bank of America purchased 6 billion H-shares for approximately HK$2.42 per share using call options under a formula in the initial acquisition agreement. Bank of America subsequently held about 25.1 billion H-shares, representing about 10.75% of CCB's issued shares, with a commitment not to sell the 6 billion shares that it purchased from Huijin using the call option before 29 August 2011 without prior consent of CCB.

In May 2009, speculation was raised that Bank of America had sold US$7.3 billion worth of CCB shares after being ordered to obtain more capital following the results of the Dodd-Frank Act Annual Stress Test.

On 29 August 2011, Bank of America announced it would sell approximately half its stake in CCB (13.1 billion shares worth about US$8.3 billion) to an undisclosed group of investors.

In September 2013, Bank of America sold its remaining stake in the China Construction Bank for as much as $1.5 billion.

== International expansion ==
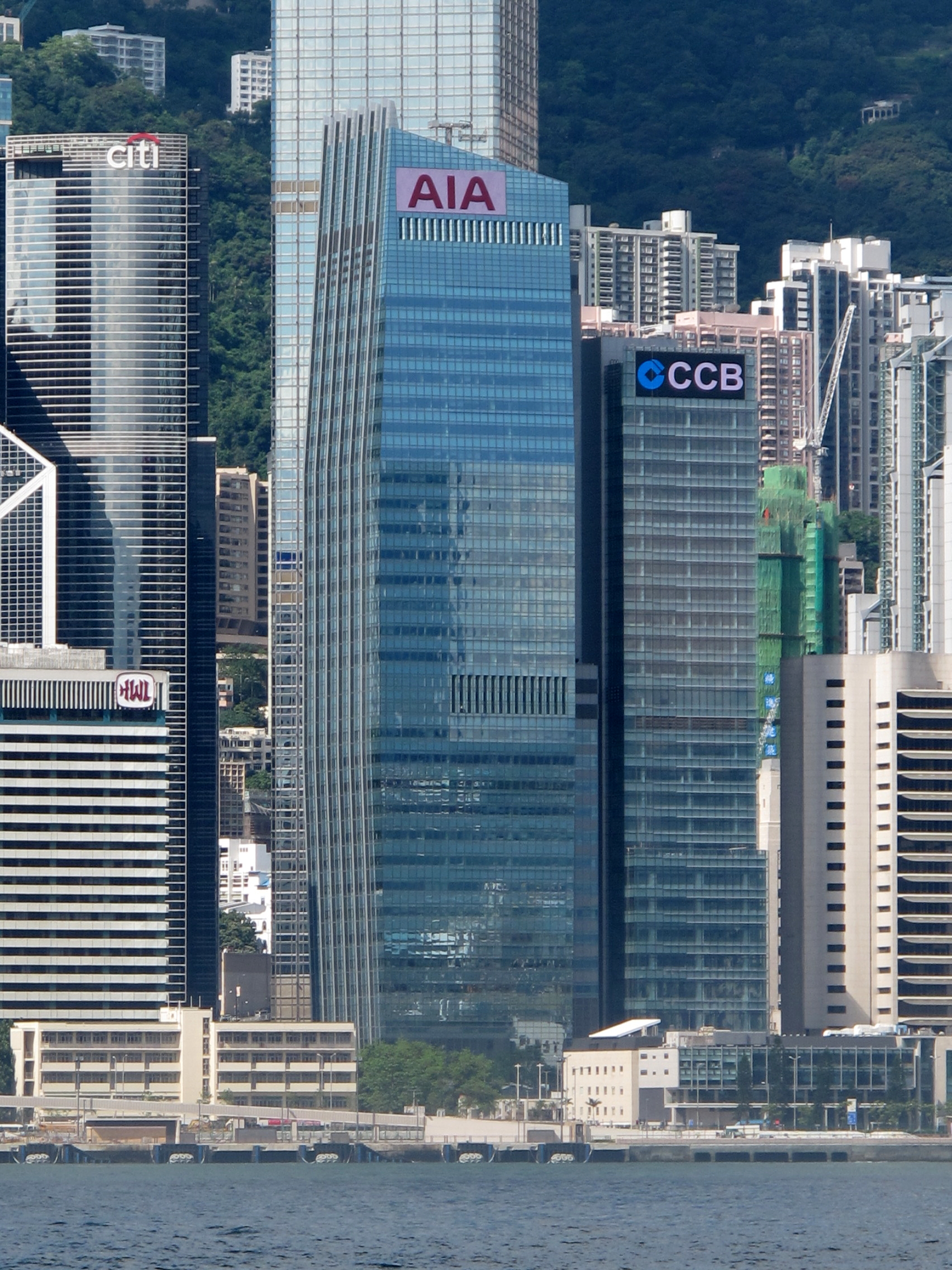
CCB tower (right) in Hong Kong

China Construction Bank Luxemburg

In 2006, CCB acquired Bank of America (Asia), which started in 1912 in Hong Kong as Bank of Canton, and had a subsidiary in Macao.

CCB opened a London office on 2 June 2009.

In 2008, CCB submitted an application to the New York State Banking Department and the Federal Reserve Board to establish a branch in New York City. CCB officially opened its New York branch on 6 June 2009.

In 2013, CCB opened its European Headquarters in Luxembourg.

In 2016, CCB Indonesia was founded by the merger between two banks: Bank Windu Kentjana and Bank Anda.

== Health fund ==
China Construction Bank investment division launched a CN¥5 billion (US$731.3 million) fund called China Healthcare Investment Fund to focus on investments in China's rapidly growing healthcare sector. The fund focuses on investments in healthcare related sectors including pharmacy, medical equipment manufacturing, medical institutions and services. It is the first domestic investment fund specializing in investments in China's healthcare industry.

== Stock exchanges listing ==
In late 2005, China Construction Bank made an initial public offering on the Stock Exchange of Hong Kong. In late 2007, it made China's second-largest initial public offering of CN¥57.12 billion (US$7.6 billion) on the Shanghai Stock Exchange.

The bank is a component of Hang Seng Index, SSE 180 Index and other indexes of Pan-Chinese and Pan-Asia stock exchanges, such as CSI 300 Index, Hang Seng China 50 Index, FTSE China A50 Index and S&P Asia 50.

The bank was also a component of the Hang Seng China Enterprises Index.

== Leadership ==
- Wu Boshan, president September 1980 - December 1984
- Zhou Daojiong, president December 1984 - April 1994
- Wang Qishan, president February 1994 - February 1998
- Zhou Xiaochuan, president February 1998 - February 2000
- Wang Xuebing, president February 2000 - January 2002
- Zhang Enzhao, president January 2002 - September 2004, chairman 15 September 2004 - 16 March 2005
- Chang Zhenming, president 15 September 2004 - 23 July 2006
- Guo Shuqing, chairman 25 March 2005 - 28 October 2011
- Zhang Jianguo, president 27 July 2006 - 12 June 2015
- Wang Hongzhang, chairman 16 January 2012 - 16 August 2017
- Wang Zuji, president 12 June 2015 - 27 March 2019
- Tian Guoli, chairman 9 October 2017 - 26 March 2024
- Liu Guiping, president 27 March 2019 - 27 November 2020
- Wang Jiang, president 5 February 2021 - 24 March 2022
- Zhang Jinliang, president 27 May 2022 - 26 March 2024, chairman since 27 March 2024

== Awards ==
- Global 2000 Rank #2 - World's Largest Public Companies in 2016

== See also ==
- Asset management in China
