= Liu Sheng (lieutenant general) =

Chinese politician (born 1956)

- 刘胜

Deputy Head of Equipment Development Department of the Central Military Commission
- Incumbent
- Assumed office 2016
- Head: Li Shangfu

Personal details
- Born: February 1956 (age 70) Fuzhou, Fujian, China
- Party: Chinese Communist Party
- Relations: Liu Xiaorong
- Parent(s): Liu Peishan; Zuo Ying
- Education: Northwestern Polytechnical University

Military service
- Allegiance: People's Republic of China
- Branch/service: People's Liberation Army Ground Force
- Years of service: ?–present
- Rank: Lieutenant general
- Commands: General Armament Department of the People's Liberation Army

Chinese name
- Simplified Chinese: 刘胜
- Traditional Chinese: 劉勝
Transcriptions
Standard Mandarin
- Hanyu Pinyin: Liú Shèng

Liu Sheng (Chinese: 刘胜; born February 1956) is a lieutenant general (zhongjiang) of the People's Liberation Army (PLA) serving as deputy head of Equipment Development Department of the Central Military Commission. He was a delegate to the 11th National People's Congress. He was an alternate of the 18th Central Committee of the Chinese Communist Party. He served as a delegate to the 19th National Congress of the Chinese Communist Party.

== Biography ==
Liu was born in Fuzhou, Fujian, in February 1956, while his ancestral home in Chaling County, Hunan. His father Liu Peishan was a founding lieutenant general (zhongjiang) the People's Liberation Army. His mother Zuo Ying was deputy chairperson of Shanghai People's Congress. His elder brother Liu Xiaorong is also a lieutenant general of the People's Liberation Army. He graduated from Northwestern Polytechnical University, majoring in aircraft engine.

Liu worked in the People's Liberation Army General Armaments Department, where he was head of Arms and Services Equipment Division in 2005, head of Co-ordination Planning Division in 2007, and deputy head of the General Armament Department in 2009. In 2016, he was appointed deputy head of the newly founded Equipment Development Department of the Central Military Commission.
