= Liu Xiaorong =

Chinese lieutenant general (born 1950)

- 刘晓榕

Deputy Political Commissar of People's Liberation Army General Logistics Department
- In office December 2010 – December 2015
- Political Commissar: Liu Yuan

Personal details
- Born: March 1950 (age 76) Fuzhou, Fujian, China
- Party: Chinese Communist Party
- Relations: Liu Sheng
- Parent(s): Liu Peishan; Zuo Ying
- Education: Zhejiang University

Military service
- Allegiance: People's Republic of China
- Branch/service: People's Liberation Army Ground Force
- Years of service: 1968–2015
- Rank: Lieutenant general
- Commands: General Armament Department of the People's Liberation Army

Chinese name
- Simplified Chinese: 刘晓榕
- Traditional Chinese: 劉曉榕
Transcriptions
Standard Mandarin
- Hanyu Pinyin: Liú Xiǎoróng

Liu Xiaorong (Chinese: 刘晓榕; born March 1950) is a lieutenant general (zhongjiang) of the People's Liberation Army (PLA). He was a member of the 17th Central Commission for Discipline Inspection and a member of the 12th Standing Committee of the Chinese People's Political Consultative Conference.

== Biography ==
Liu was born in Fuzhou, Fujian, in March 1950, while his ancestral home in Chaling County, Hunan. His father Liu Peishan was a founding lieutenant general (zhongjiang) of the People's Liberation Army. His mother Zuo Ying was deputy chairperson of Shanghai People's Congress. His younger brother Liu Sheng is also a lieutenant general of the People's Liberation Army.

He enlisted in the People's Liberation Army in March 1968 and joined the Chinese Communist Party in May 1969. In March 1994, he was promoted to director of Political Department of the First Group Army (now 72nd Group Army), and held that office until July 1999, when he was promoted again to become political commissar. In December 2006, he was transferred to Lanzhou Military Region and appointed deputy political commissar, concurrently serving as secretary of its Commission for Discipline Inspection, the party's agency in charge of anti-corruption efforts. In December 2010, he was appointed deputy political commissar of People's Liberation Army General Logistics Department, serving in the post until his retirement in December 2015.

He was promoted to the rank of major general (shaojiang) in July 1996 and lieutenant general (zhongjiang) in July 2008.
