= Qian Ying (communist politician) =

Chinese government official (1903–1973)

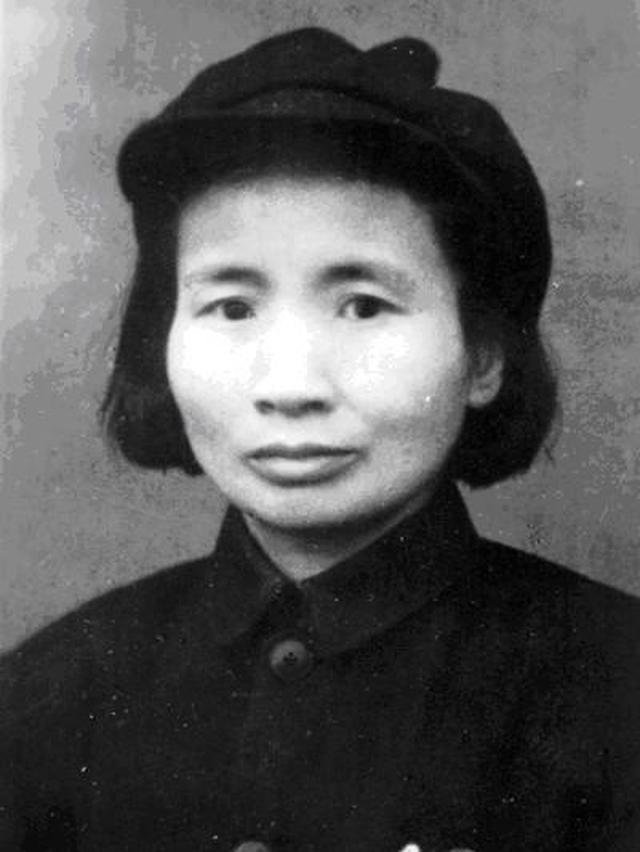
Qian Ying

Qian Ying (Note: In this Chinese name, the family name is Qian.) (simplified Chinese: 钱瑛; traditional Chinese: 錢瑛, 14 May 1903 — 26 July 1973) was a Chinese politician who served as Minister of Supervision of the People's Republic of China from 1954 to 1959.

== Life ==
Qian Ying was born in Qianjiang County, Hubei. From 1923, she lived in Wuhan, where she studied at the Hubei Women's Normal School. She became a member of the Chinese Communist Party in 1927. From September 1954 to April 1959, she was Minister of Supervision of the People's Republic of China. In 1972, during the Cultural Revolution, she was refused medical treatment and died in 1973 from lung cancer. She was rehabilitated in 1978.

She has been described as a "female Judge Bao" (女包公).

== Sources ==
- Bartke, Wolfgang (18 June 2012). Who was Who in the People's Republic of China: With more than 3100 Portraits. Walter de Gruyter. ISBN 978-3-11-096823-1.
- Lee, Lily Xiao Hong (8 July 2016). "Qian Ying". Biographical Dictionary of Chinese Women: v. 2: Twentieth Century. By Lee, Lily Xiao Hong. Routledge. pp. 426–429. ISBN 978-1-315-49924-6.
- Veg, Sebastian (23 April 2019). Minjian: The Rise of China's Grassroots Intellectuals. Columbia University Press. ISBN 978-0-231-54940-0.
- Xian'an Government (8 October 2018). "钱瑛：女革命家、国家监察部第一任部长-咸安区人民政府". www.xianan.gov.cn (in Chinese (Taiwan)). Archived from the original on 12 December 2021.
