= Ma Wen =

Chinese politician (born 1948)

- 马𫘜

Minister of Supervision
- In office August 2007 – 16 March 2013
- Premier: Wen Jiabao
- Preceded by: Li Zhilun
- Succeeded by: Huang Shuxian

Deputy Secretary of the Central Commission for Discipline Inspection
- In office 13 January 2004 – 15 November 2012 Serving with 11 other individuals: He Yong (1997–2012); Xia Zanzhong (1997–2007); Liu Xirong (2000–2007); Fu Jie (2000–2002); Zhang Huixin (2002–2007); Li Zhilun (2002–2007); Zhang Shutian (2002–2007); Liu Fengyan (2002–2007); Gan Yisheng (2007–2012); Sun Zhongtong (2007–2012); Zhang Yi (2007–2012); Huang Shuxian (2007–present); Li Yufu (2007–2014); Wu Yuliang (2011–present); Chen Wenqing (2011–present)

Personal details
- Born: July 1948 (age 77)
- Party: Chinese Communist Party

Ma Wen (simplified Chinese: 马𫘜; traditional Chinese: 馬馼; pinyin: Mǎ Wén; born July 1948) is a Chinese politician, currently serving as the Chair of the National People's Congress Internal and Judicial Affairs Committee. Previously served as Minister of Supervision between 2007 and 2013. She also headed the National Bureau of Corruption Prevention.

== Biography ==
Ma was born in Wuqiao County in Hebei province. She graduated from the history department of Nankai University, specializing in Chinese history. In August 1972, she joined the Chinese Communist Party (CCP).

In her youth, Ma Wen worked in Bayannur League in Inner Mongolia. In 1978, after succeeding in China's National College Entrance Examination, she entered Nankai University to study history. After graduation, she served in a number of capacities at Nankai University, including as deputy secretary. In 1989, Ma began working for the Chinese government. After working briefly as the deputy head of the information office of the National Population and Family Planning Commission, she served as the deputy secretary of the Party organization committee of the Commission. She began her work with the Central Commission for Discipline Inspection in 1997, after being appointed a member of the organization at the 15th National People's Congress. She was made the deputy secretary of the Commission in 2004, only the third woman to hold the position, after Deng Yingchao and Liu Liying. On 28 April 2007, the Minister of Supervision, Li Zhilun, died of an illness. Ma Wen was appointed to take his place in August of that year. She was the second female Minister of Supervision, after Qian Ying. In September of the same year, Ma Wen took up her other current position as head of the National Bureau of Corruption Prevention.

She was a member of the 15th and 16th Central Commissions for Discipline Inspection (CCDI), as well as the Deputy Secretary of the 16th and 17th CCDI Commissions. She was a member of the 17th Central Committee of the Chinese Communist Party.

Government offices
Preceded by Li Zhilun	Minister of Supervision; 2007–2013	Succeeded by Huang Shuxian
