= Wang Huimin (politician, born 1959) =

Chinese politician

- 王会民

Vice Chairman of the People's Government of the Xinjiang Uygur Autonomous Region
- In office January 2012 – January 2014
- Chairman: Arken Imirbaki

Personal details
- Born: February 1959 (age 67) Ning County, Gansu, China
- Party: Chinese Communist Party (1982-2025, expelled)
- Education: Xinjiang University; Cheung Kong Graduate School of Business

Chinese name
- Simplified Chinese: 王会民
- Traditional Chinese: 王會民
Transcriptions
Standard Mandarin
- Hanyu Pinyin: Wáng Huìmín

Wang Huimin (Chinese: 王会民; born February 1959) is a former Chinese politician. As of March 2025 he was under investigation by China's top anti-graft watchdog. He served as vice chairman of the People's Congress of Xinjiang Uygur Autonomous Region from 2012 to 2014.

== Career in Xinjiang ==
Wang was born in Ning County, Gansu, in February 1959.

In July 1975, he was sent to the May Seventh Cadre Schools to do farm works in Makit County of Xinjiang Uygur Autonomous Region. He became an accountant and secretary of Makit County Cotton and Hemp Company in February 1976, and was chosen as an editor of Makit County Broadcasting Station in January 1980. He joined the Chinese Communist Party (CCP) in November 1982. He began his political career in June 1983, when he was appointed an official of the Publicity Department of the CCP Makit County Committee.

In January 1984, Wang was despatched to the Xinjiang Branch of the China Construction Bank, where he assumed various posts. At there, he was eventually promoted to governor in April 1998.

Wang was appointed assistant to the chairman of the People's Government of the Xinjiang Uygur Autonomous Region in February 2002, concurrently serving as director of Financial Work Office since August 2005 and secretary of the Party Committee of the Xinjiang Uygur Autonomous Regional Rural Credit Cooperative Union since August 2008. In January 2012, he took office as vice chairman of the People's Congress of Xinjiang Uygur Autonomous Region, the region's top legislative body.

== Career in Beijing ==
In January 2014, Wang became a member of the Party Committee of the China Securities Regulatory Commission and was chosen as secretary of the Discipline Inspection Commission and subsequently leader of the Discipline Inspection and Supervision Group of the Central Commission for Discipline Inspection and the National Supervisory Commission stationed in the China Securities Regulatory Commission in December 2015.

== Investigation ==
Wang has been retired for 6 years. On 21 March 2025, Wang was suspected of "serious violations of laws and regulations" by the Central Commission for Discipline Inspection (CCDI), the party's internal disciplinary body, and the National Supervisory Commission, the highest anti-corruption agency of China. His son Wang Bangzhong (王邦重) was also placed under investigation. He was expelled from the Party on 24 November.

On 27 October 2026, Wang was sentenced to suspended death sentence that will be commuted to life imprisonment after two years, with no possibility of parole at the Chengdu Intermediate People's Court, for taking bribes in 436 million yuan.
