= Zhang Lijun (economist) =

Chinese economist

- 张力军
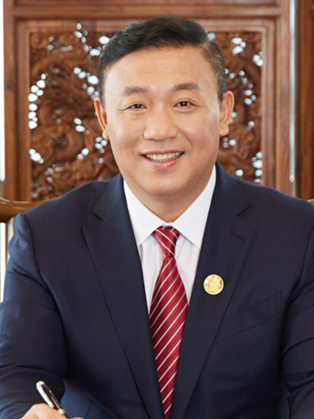
- Born: October 1963 (age 62–63); Tianjin, China
- Occupation: Economist
- Known for: V1 Group

Academic background
- Education: Nankai University

Academic work
- Institutions: Stanford University

Zhang Lijun (Chinese: 张力军; born October 1963) is a Chinese business executive and economist. He is a research scholar at Stanford University and is also the Chairman of V1 Group, Dubai China-Arab Satellite TV, and other organizations. Zhang has also served as a visiting professor at the University of Sydney and Nankai University.

== Early life and education ==
Zhang Lijun was born in Tianjin, China. He holds a doctorate in economics from Nankai University.

== Career ==
Zhang founded VODone in 2005. The next year, the company was listed on the Hong Kong Stock Exchange. VODone subsidiary China Mobile Games Entertainment Group (CMGEG) was listed on Nasdaq in 2012. The e-commerce company Baby Grid, which Zhang chaired, listed on National Equities Exchange and Quotations in 2015. As chairman of VODOne, CMGEG, and Baby Grid, Zhang became the first Chinese citizen to be chairman of companies on American, Chinese, and Hong Kong stock exchanges.

Zhang is a research scholar at Stanford University in Palo Alto, California.

He has served as a visiting professor at the University of Sydney and Nankai University, a director of Association for Cross-Taiwan Strait Relations, and a consultant for the Overseas Chinese Affairs Office of the State Council.

From 1998 to 2012, he served as the China representative of ABAC (APEC Business Advisory Council) and currently serves as the chairman of the China APEC Development Council. Over the years, he has been engaged in international exchanges and cooperation with the Asia-Pacific Economic Cooperation (APEC).

While serving as the representative of the APEC Business Advisory Council to China, Zhang initiated the APEC Business Travel Card Program. With the support of relevant leaders and the government, China successfully joined the APEC Business Travel Card Program (ABTC).

== Personal life ==
Zhang Lijun lives in Beijing, China.

== Books ==
- Language Strategy along the Belt and Road. ISBN 978-7-5035-7189-3.
- 中国产业投资基金论. ISBN 7-5005-4369-7. (in Chinese)
- 世界经济与中国. ISBN 7-80050-988-5. (in Chinese)
