= Feng Jianshen =

Chinese politician (1952–2022)

Feng Jianshen (Chinese: 冯健身; August 1952 – 16 May 2022) was a Chinese politician, and former chairman of the Chinese People's Political Consultative Conference Gansu Committee. He was born in Yanji, Jilin Province. He has a doctorate in management and was a senior auditor. He began his career in Heilongjiang province, then moved to the national ministry of finance, being put in charge of budgeting and managing the national debt. In 1999 he went to study at Columbia University and interned briefly with Morgan Stanley. In August 2004 he became vice governor of Gansu and a member of the provincial party standing committee. He was made the CPPCC Chair of Gansu province in early 2011 and replaced by Ouyang Jian in early 2018.
