= Yunyi (prince) =

Yunyi (Chinese: 允禕, Manchu :ᠶᡡᠨ ᡳ)(1 September 1706 – 30 June 1755), formally known as Prince Jianjing (簡靖貝勒), was an imperial prince of Qing dynasty, the 20th son of Kangxi Emperor.

== Life ==
Yunyi was born in September 1706 to Kangxi's lower concubine, Gao Zaiyi (高在儀), who was only a Mistress (咯咯) at the time of his birth. By the same mother, he had two older full-brothers, who did not survive past age two.

He often accompanied his father to the frontier and on hunting trips. In 1726, he was entitled as Prince of the Fourth Rank (固山贝子). Later, in 1730, he was promoted to Prince of the Third Rank (多罗贝勒).

During the Yongzheng reign, in 1734, Yunyi was twice sent to offer a sacrifice to the mausoleum, but he pretended to be sick and was demoted to Duke of The Second Rank (辅国公).

== Family ==
=== Primary Consort ===
- Imperial Princess Consort Jianjing, of the Oirat Borjigin clan (簡靖貝勒 嫡夫人鄂勒特氏), daughter of Abao, Prince Alashan of the Second Rank (阿拉善郡王阿宝)
