= Dorje Tseten =

Chinese politician of Tibetan ethnicity (b. 1926, d. 2013)

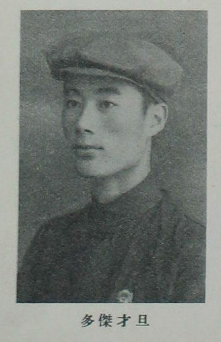
Dorje Tseden.jpg

Dorje Tseten (Tibetan: རྡོ་རྗེ་ཚེ་བརྟན་, Wylie: rdo rje tshe brtan, ZWPY: Doje Cedain), also Duojie Caidan (多傑才旦); November 1926, Huangzhong - July 6, 2013, Beijing) is a Chinese scholar, historian and politician of Tibetan ethnicity. He was chairman of the Tibet Autonomous Region (TAR) before becoming the first director of the China Tibetology Research Center.

== Early life ==
Tseten was born in November 1926 in Huangzhong County, Qinhai Province.

In September 1948, Tseten graduated from Beijing Normal University with a degree in education.

== Career ==
He was one of the few Tibetan communists, a group of scientists and teachers, who were sent to Tibet to extol the benefits of Marxism-Leninism. The group arrived Chamdo early in the winter of 1951.

On 28 March 1959, he was appointed as a member of the preparatory committee for establishing the TAR. During the Cultural Revolution, he went into hiding.

In 1981, he became Vice President of the People's Congress of the TAR. From March 1983 to June 1985, he was one of the secretaries of the Communist Party in Tibet. From April 1983 to 1985, he was chairman of the People's Committee of TAR.

In 1986, he was removed from his post in Tibet, following a change in the Communist Party's position on Tibet after the 1987-1989 protests. He was appointed as the director of China Tibetology Research Center in Beijing, and he remained in this position until 2000.

He retired in April 2004, at the age of 78.

He died on 6 July 2013 in Beijing.

== Views on Tibetan education ==
In 1991, he published his book on education in Tibet, describing Tibetan language education as a crucial issue given "strong differences of opinion". He attributed the absence of Tibetan education during the Cultural Revolution to the rapid expansion of education, the shortage of teachers and textbooks, and the influence of leftist ideology. It emphasized the importance of Tibetan in the development of education and economy.

He reported that in a 1982 pilot project in three high schools in Lhasa, Gyantse, and Lhokha to compare the respective merits of Tibetan vs Han, classes taught in Tibetan at Gyantsé averaged twice as many exam marks as the classes taught in Han. The project was discontinued due to lack of books, qualified teachers and mismanagement. He recommended that Han not be taught in primary schools in rural areas and the use of Tibetan in education gradually be applied to middle school.

== Notes ==
1. Dorje Tseten belongs to the first generation of Tibetan communist leaders since the Chinese military intervention in Tibet, a generation mainly from the eastern Tibetan regions of Kham and Amdo, where Chinese presence preexisted. This group was composed of aristocrats and other Tibetans co-opted to official positions, and Tibetans from eastern Tibet who joined the Communist Party in the early days and came to occupy important positions in the Tibet Autonomous Region (RAT). Most leaders of this group later suffered severe persecution during the Cultural Revolution.
