= Ma Guorui =

Chinese politician

Secretary of the Central Commission for Discipline Inspection
- In office 1978–1985

Personal details
- Born: 1915 Nangong, Hebei, China
- Died: 2005 (aged 89–90)

Ma Guorui (Chinese: 马国瑞) (1915–2005) was a Chinese politician. He was born in Nangong, Hebei. He was Chairman of the CPPCC Committee of his home province. He was a delegate to the 3rd National People's Congress and 5th National People's Congress and a member of the Central Advisory Commission.

Preceded by New office	Chairmen of the Hebei CPPCC Committee	Succeeded by Yan Dakai
