= Zhang Lijun (politician) =

Chinese politician (born 1952)

- 张力军

Vice-Minister of Environmental Protection
- In office March 2008 – February 2013
- Minister: Zhou Shengxian

Personal details
- Born: July 1952 (age 74) Huadian County, Jilin
- Party: Chinese Communist Party (expelled)
- Education: Northeastern University
- Occupation: Politician

Zhang Lijun (simplified Chinese: 张力军; traditional Chinese: 張力軍; pinyin: Zhāng Lìjūn; born July 1952) is a former Chinese politician who served as vice-minister of Environmental Protection from March 2008 to February 2013. He was placed under investigation by the Communist Party's anti-corruption agency in late July 2015. He was removed from membership of China's top political advisory body, the Chinese People's Political Consultative Conference, in the following month.

== Biography ==
Zhang was born in Huadian County, Jilin province, in July 1952. During the Down to the Countryside Movement, he performed manual labour in Panshi County as a sent-down youth. After graduating from Northeastern Institute of Technology (now Northeastern University) in December 1975, he was assigned to a factory in Jilin city as a technician and then deputy director.

After the Cultural Revolution, Zhang became deputy director of Jilin Municipal Planning Committee between May 1978 and June 1984. Then he was transferred to Shulan County and successively served as deputy county governor, deputy party chief, and county governor. He became director and party group secretary of Jilin Provincial Environmental Protection Agency in July 1989, and served until January 1993, when he was appointed president of China Environment News.

From February 1997 towards, he assumed various posts in the Ministry of Environmental Protection's Department of Planning and Finance and Pollution Control Office, and over a period of 11 years worked his way up to the position of vice-minister. He retired in 2013 after having reached the customary retirement age for vice-minister level officials of 60.

Zhang was placed under investigation for "serious violations of laws and regulations" by the Communist Party's disciplinary body in late July 2015, and a month later he was removed from membership of the Chinese People's Political Consultative Conference. Zhang was the first senior official (or "green tiger", Chinese: 环保首虎) in the environmental protection system to be investigated in Xi Jinping's ongoing anti-corruption battle after he took power of General Secretary of the Chinese Communist Party in the 18th CCP National Congress. He was expelled from the CCP on December 31, 2015.

On November 9, 2016, Zhang was sentenced for 4 years in prison.
