= Wang Wei (PRC politician) =

Chinese politician

- 王伟

Deputy Secretary of the Central Commission for Discipline Inspection
- In office November 15, 2012 – May 21, 2013
- Secretary: Wang Qishan

Personal details
- Born: January 1960 (age 66) Jianchang County, Liaoning, China
- Party: Chinese Communist Party

Wang Wei (Chinese: 王伟; born January 1960) is a Chinese politician. He spent a major part of his career at the Central Commission for Discipline Inspection. In 2013, Wang was named the deputy director of the office in charge of the Three Gorges Dam project.

== Career ==
Wang was born in Jianchang County, Liaoning province. He studied political economics at Renmin University of China. He joined the Chinese Communist Party in 1983, and first worked as a Communist Youth League functionary at his alma mater. Between 1985 and 1993 he served successively as the Renmin University Youth League deputy secretary, then Secretary. He also worked in the party's propaganda wing and as the head of the General Office at the university. In December 1993 he became the assistant to the district governor of Xicheng District in Beijing. A few months later he was named deputy district governor. He stayed in the post for some four years.

In May 1998, he was transferred to work for the Central Commission for Discipline Inspection (CCDI), where he became an inspector and oversaw the direct subsidiary organs of the CCDI, as well as the center for shared services (机关综合服务中心). In 2003, he became the head of the General Office of the CCDI. He then received a master's degree from the Central Party School.

In 2005, Wang was named the head of the General Office serving the predecessor body to the Central Leading Group for Inspection Work, officially joining the provincial-ministerial ranks. In October 2007, at the 17th National Congress of the Chinese Communist Party, Wang was named a Standing Committee member of the CCDI. He also acted as the spokesperson for the Ministry of Supervision, in addition to being vice minister. In February 2008 he became the top spokesperson for the CCDI. At the 18th National Congress of the Chinese Communist Party held in November 2012, Wang was named a Deputy Secretary of the Central Commission for Discipline Inspection.

In May 2013, after a fifteen-year career at the CCDI, Wang left his posts there to become deputy director of the State Council Office for the Three Gorges Dam project, with the ranking of a cabinet minister.

In May 2018, Wang was transferred to work for the All China Federation of Supply and Marketing Cooperatives (中华全国供销合作总社), and became a member of its CCP committee.
