= Jin Yinhuan =

Chinese politician

Jin Yinhuan (Chinese: 金银焕; pinyin: Jīn Yínhuàn; March 1952 – October 2008) was a Chinese politician from Shanxi province.

Born in Yangqu County, Shanxi province, she joined the Chinese Communist Party in May 1971. She was one of the top Yangqu County officials during the latter stages of the Cultural Revolution. In 1978 she became the head of the Communist Youth League organization in the provincial capital Taiyuan, before being elevated to head the provincial CYL organization in 1985 at the age of 33. She then served as the Deputy Party Secretary of Xinzhou, the Deputy Party Secretary of Taiyuan, and then the Party Secretary of Shuozhou, the highest office in the city. By 2000, Jin took on the post of Secretary of the Provincial Discipline Inspection Commission, heading anti-graft work in the province, and was elevated to the party's provincial Standing Committee, in practice the top ruling council of Shanxi. In 2005 she became the President of the Shanxi Provincial Party School. Jin became the Deputy Party Secretary of Shanxi province in October 2006, and the Chairwoman of the provincial Political Consultative Conference, a largely ceremonial post that nonetheless made her a full provincial-ministerial level official.

In October 2008, Jin died in a car accident while travelling on the expressway between Xinzhou and Taiyuan. She was travelling back from Xinzhou after visiting on government business. She was 56 years old. In her official obituary, she was said to have "died while on the job."

Jin was an alternate member of the 15th Central Committee of the Chinese Communist Party and a member of the 16th Central Commission for Discipline Inspection.

She had one son.
