= Li Zhilun =

Chinese politician (1942-2007)

- 李至伦

Minister of Supervision
- In office 17 March 2003 – 28 April 2007
- Premier: Wen Jiabao
- Preceded by: He Yong
- Succeeded by: Ma Wen

Personal details
- Born: 10 March 1942 Jinzhou, Fengtian,Manchukuo (now Liaoning, China)
- Died: 28 April 2007 (aged 65) Beijing, China
- Party: Chinese Communist Party
- Education: China University of Political Science and Law

Chinese name
- Simplified Chinese: 李至伦
- Traditional Chinese: 李至倫
Transcriptions
Standard Mandarin
- Hanyu Pinyin: Lǐ Zhìlún

Li Zhilun (Chinese: 李至伦; 10 March 1942 – 28 April 2007) was a Chinese politician who served as minister of Supervision from 2003 until his death in 2007. He was a representative of the 13th, 15th, and 16th National Congress of the Chinese Communist Party. He was a member of the 16th Central Committee of the Chinese Communist Party.

== Biography ==
Li was born in Jinzhou, Liaoning, on 10 March 1942. In 1962, he was accepted to Beijing Institute of Political Science (now China University of Political Science and Law), majoring in politics and law.

He joined the Chinese Communist Party (CCP) in January 1964. After university in 1967, he was assigned to the government of Baoting County (now Baoting Li and Miao Autonomous County). In January 1979, he was transferred to Beijing and became an official in the Communist Youth League of China. He was president of the China Youth Daily in April 1985, and held that office until January 1987. He was despatched to the Ministry of Supervision in January 1987. He moved up the ranks to become vice minister in March 1992 and minister in March 2003. He also served as deputy secretary of the Central Commission for Discipline Inspection.

On 28 April 2007, he died of a sudden illness at the age of 65.

Government offices
Preceded by He Yong	Minister of Supervision; 2003–2007	Succeeded by Ma Wen
