= Li Xueju =

Chinese politician (born 1945)

Li Xueju (simplified Chinese: 李学举; traditional Chinese: 李學舉; pinyin: Lǐ Xuéjǔ; born April 1945) is a politician of the People's Republic of China, and the former Minister of Civil Affairs of PRC.

Born in Gongzhuling, Jilin Province, Li joined the Chinese Communist Party in January 1966, and started working in May 1966. In early years, he served in various posts in local commune. In 1975, he was promoted to Secretary of Communist Youth League committee in Siping region of Jilin. From 1978, he served as vice section chief, vice director and later, director of organization department of CYL central committee. From 1984 to 1986, he studied at CCP Central Party School. In 1986, he was appointed as the director of general office of CYL central committee. He was a member of 10th CYL central committee, and a standing member of 11th and 12th CYL central committee.

From 1988, Li served in Ministry of Civil Affairs. In September 1996, he was transferred to Chongqing (then part of Sichuan Province) and became a standing committee member and the head of organization department of CCP Chongqing municipal committee. In June 1997, when Chongqing became a direct-controlled municipality, Li was a standing committee member of CCP committee. From 1998 to July 2001, he served as vice secretary of CCP Chongqing committee. In July 2001, he was appointed as vice Minister of Civil Affairs. From March 2003 to June 2010, he served as Minister of Civil Affairs and the Party chief of the Ministry.

Li was a member of 17th Central Committee of the Chinese Communist Party, which was in session from 2002 to 2007.
