= Liu Xiwu =

Chinese politician

Secretary of the Central Commission for Discipline Inspection
- In office 1955–1966

Party Secretary of Jilin
- Succeeded by: Li Mengling

Personal details
- Born: July 12, 1904 Mengzhou, Jiaozuo, Henan, China
- Died: February 28, 1970 (aged 65)
- Party: Chinese Communist Party

Liu Xiwu (Chinese: 刘锡五) (July 12, 1904 – February 28, 1970) was a People's Republic of China politician. He was born in Meng County, Henan Province (modern Mengzhou, Jiaozuo, Henan Province) and educated in Kaifeng. In August 1924 he joined the Communist Youth League of China and in 1926 he became a member of the Chinese Communist Party. While studying at Shanghai University, he joined the League of Left-Wing Writers in 1930. In 1936, he left Shanghai for Yan'an, Shaanxi Province. After the founding of the People's Republic, he became the Chinese Communist Party Committee Secretary of Jilin Province.

Preceded by New office	Party Secretary of Jilin	Succeeded by Li Mengling
