= He Yong (politician) =

Chinese politician (born 1940)

- 何勇
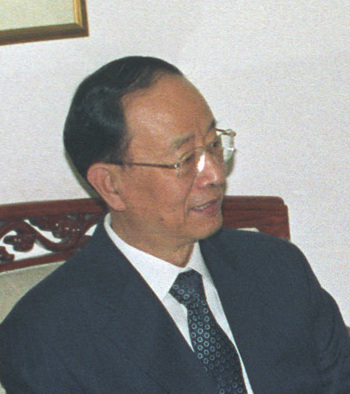
- He in 2006

Minister of Supervision
- In office 15 March 1998 – 15 March 2003
- Premier: Zhu Rongji
- Preceded by: Cao Qingze
- Succeeded by: Li Zhilun

Deputy Secretary of the Central Commission for Discipline Inspection
- In office 18 September 1997 – 15 November 2012

Personal details
- Born: October 1940 (age 85) Qianxi County, Hebei, China
- Party: Chinese Communist Party

He Yong (Chinese: 何勇; born October 1940) is a retired Chinese politician. A military hardware technician by training, He rose through the ranks of the party in the 1980s, and joined the supervision and anti-corruption system in the 1990s. He served as the Minister of Supervision, as well as Deputy Secretary of the Central Commission for Discipline Inspection, the top anti-corruption body of the party. Between 2002 and 2012, He was a member of the Secretariat of the Chinese Communist Party.

== Biography ==
He Yong was born in Qianxi County, Hebei province. In 1958, He was made a "preparatory member of the Chinese Communist Party" at the age of 18, when he was still in high school. He was then admitted to the precision instruments department at Tianjin University, where he studied on-and-off until 1968; during this phase he also took time off because of the outbreak of the Cultural Revolution in 1966 which caused chaos in academic institutions.

In July 1968, He was assigned to a tank production factory in Hubei province, where he worked initially as a technician but later took on more administrative roles, eventually rising to become head of the factory. He worked for fifteen years at the factory. In 1983, He was transferred to the provincial science and defence office. In 1983, after the formation of the state Ministry of Weaponry Production, He was recommended by then-minister Zou Jiahua to oversee cadre affairs in the ministry.

In 1986, He Yong's profile was forwarded to party General Secretary Hu Yaobang on recommendation of then Organization Department head Wei Jianxing. He Yong was named deputy head of the Organization Department, in charge of performance reviews of officials at vice-minister level and above. However, after Hu Yaobang was forced from office, a shake-up at the Organization Department occurred. He left the department to join his patron Wei Jianxing at the newly established Ministry of Supervision, becoming vice minister. In 1992, he was named a member of the Standing Committee of the Central Commission for Discipline Inspection (CCDI), the party's top anti-corruption body, and in 1997, he was named Deputy Secretary of the Central Commission for Discipline Inspection, ranked third, concurrently holding the office of the Minister of Supervision.

In 2002, at the 16th Party Congress, He Yong was named the top-ranked Deputy Secretary of the CCDI, earning a seat on the Secretariat of the Chinese Communist Party, and ascending to "deputy national leader" ranks. In 2007, at the 17th Party Congress, He renewed for one more term on the body despite being 67 years of age. He worked for three CCDI chiefs, Wei Jianxing, Wu Guanzheng, and He Guoqiang, and was the longest-serving CCDI deputy secretary in the history of the organization. In 2012, at the 18th Party Congress, He retired and left politics.
