= Huang Shuxian =

Chinese politician (born 1954)

- 黄树贤

Deputy Secretary of the Central Commission for Discipline Inspection
- In office 21 October 2007 – 27 December 2016
- Secretary: He Guoqiang (2007–2012); Wang Qishan (2012–)

Minister of Civil Affairs
- In office November 7, 2016 – October 26, 2019
- Premier: Li Keqiang
- Preceded by: Li Liguo
- Succeeded by: Li Jiheng

Minister of Supervision
- In office March 16, 2013 – November 7, 2016
- Premier: Li Keqiang
- Preceded by: Ma Wen
- Succeeded by: Yang Xiaodu

Personal details
- Born: September 1954 (age 72) Yangzhong, Jiangsu
- Party: Chinese Communist Party
- Education: Nanjing University
- Occupation: Official

Huang Shuxian (Chinese: 黄树贤; pinyin: Huáng Shùxián; born September 1954) is a Chinese politician, who previously served as the Minister of Civil Affairs of the People's Republic of China. He also served as Minister of Supervision, and Deputy Secretary of the Central Commission for Discipline Inspection.

== Career ==
Huang was born in Yangzhong, Jiangsu. He graduated from Nanjing University with a degree in philosophy. Huang spent his earlier career in his home province of Jiangsu, first as the party chief of Yangzhong County, then as the head of the Communist Youth League organization of Jiangsu province. In 1998, Huang became the deputy Discipline Inspection Secretary of Jiangsu province and the head of the province's department of Supervision. In February 2001, Huang was promoted to Vice Minister of Supervision of the People's Republic of China. He became a Standing Committee member of the CCDI at the 16th National Congress of the Chinese Communist Party in 2002, and a Deputy Secretary of the Commission at the 17th National Congress of the Chinese Communist Party in 2007.

Huang was a member of the 16th, 17th, and 18th Central Commissions for Discipline Inspection, and a member of the Standing Committee of the 18th CCDI. He has been a deputy CCDI secretary since 2007. He was also a member of the 18th Central Committee of the Chinese Communist Party. Huang was also the lead auditor of the Beijing Olympics. Huang became Minister of Supervision at the 2013 National People's Congress.

Huang met with the press on a somewhat regular basis to report on the work of the CCDI and the Ministry of Supervision.

On November 7, 2016, Huang was appointed as Minister of Civil Affairs by Standing Committee of the National People's Congress, following a corruption scandal involving then-minister Li Liguo.
