= Xu Jingye (PRC) =

Chinese politician (1951–2025)

insert a caption here

Xu Jingye (Chinese: 徐敬業; pinyin: Xú Jìngyè; September 1951 – 16 July 2025) was a Chinese politician who was chairman of the Chongqing Committee of the Chinese People's Political Consultative Conference (CPPCC) from January 2013 to January 2017.

== Life and career ==
Xu was born in Jiyuan, Henan in September 1951. From 1969 to 1976, Xu was a soldier in the People's Liberation Army. He joined the Chinese Communist Party (CCP) in 1970, and became secretary of the Chongqing CCP Municipal Discipline Committee in 2006. He was a member of the Central Commission for Discipline Inspection from 2012 to 2017. In January 2018, he was elected member of the 13th CPPCC. Xu died from heart failure on 16 July 2025, at the age of 73.
