= Li Yufu =

Chinese politician

- 李玉赋

Party Branch Secretary of the All-China Federation of Trade Unions
- In office 17 October 2014 – 26 December 2020
- President: Li Jianguo; Wang Dongming
- Preceded by: Chen Hao
- Succeeded by: Chen Gang

Personal details
- Born: October 1954 (age 71–72) Jiangsu, China
- Party: Chinese Communist Party
- Education: Peking University

Li Yufu (Chinese: 李玉赋; pinyin: Lǐ Yùfù; born October 1954) is a Chinese politician who served as party branch secretary of the All-China Federation of Trade Unions between 2014 and 2020. He is a representative of the 19th National Congress of the Chinese Communist Party and is a member of the 19th Central Committee of the Chinese Communist Party. He is a member of the 13th National Committee of the Chinese People's Political Consultative Conference. He was a member of the 16th Central Commission for Discipline Inspection and was a member of the Standing Committee of the 17th and 18th Central Commission for Discipline Inspection. He was a delegate to the 12th National People's Congress.

== Biography ==
Born in Jiangsu, in October 1954, Li graduated from Peking University. During the Cultural Revolution, he worked at the Shanghai Heavy Machinery Factory from November 1974 to November 1978. He joined the Chinese Communist Party (CCP) in December 1975. In November 1978, he became an official in the Research Office of the Organization Department of the CCP Central Committee. In 1982, he entered Peking University, majoring in political science. After graduation, he was recalled to the original department. In March 1988, he was assigned to the General Office of the Ministry of Supervision, the then highest anti-corruption agency of China, and served until January 1993, when he was despatched to the Central Commission for Discipline Inspection (CCDI), the party's internal disciplinary body. In December 2002, he rose to become vice minister of Supervision, concurrently serving as deputy secretary of the Central Commission for Discipline Inspection since October 2007. He was appointed party branch secretary of the All-China Federation of Trade Unions in October 2014, concurrently serving as vice president and first secretary of the Secretariat since December of that same year. In March 2021, he took office as vice chairperson of the Culture, History and Study Committee of the National Committee of the Chinese People's Political Consultative Conference.

Party political offices
Preceded by Chen Hao	Party Branch Secretary of the All-China Federation of Trade Unions; 2014–2020	Succeeded by Chen Gang
