= 20th Central Commission for Discipline Inspection =

Electoral term of a body of the Chinese state

The 20th Central Commission for Discipline Inspection (CCDI) was elected at the 20th National Congress of the Chinese Communist Party on 22 October 2022. At its 1st Plenary Session, the Central Commission for Discipline Inspection nominated its candidates for secretary, deputy secretaries, secretary-general and other members of the 20th CCDI Standing Committee. These were later approved by the 20th Central Committee at its 1st Plenary Session on 23 October 2022.

== Convocations ==
Sessions of the 20th Central Commission for Discipline Inspection
Meeting	Date	Type	Length	Ref.
1st Plenary Session	23 October 2022	Ordinary	1 day	
2nd Plenary Session	9–11 January 2023	Ordinary	3 days	
3rd Plenary Session	8–10 January 2024	Ordinary	3 days	
4th Plenary Session	6–8 January 2025	Ordinary	3 days	
5th Plenary Session	12–14 January 2026	Ordinary	3 days	

== Composition ==
Members of the 20th Central Commission for Discipline Inspection
Name	Hanzi	19th CCDI	Birth	PM	Birthplace	Ethnicity	Gender	Ref.
Ai Juntao	艾俊涛	Old	1965	1991	Sichuan	Han	Male	
Bian Xuewen	边学文	New	1972	—	Tianjin	Han	Male	
Chen Fukuan	陈辐宽	Old	1965	1985	Jiangsu	Han	Male	
Chen Guomeng	陈国猛	Old	1966	—	Fujian	Han	Male	
Chen Guoqiang	陈国强	New	1963	1983	Hebei	Han	Male	
Chen Jian	陈健	New	1964	1987	Jiangsu	Han	Male	
Chen Jianfei	陈剑飞	New	1962	—	Jiangsu	Han	Male	
Cheng Dongfang	程东方	New	—	—	—	Han	Male	
Cheng Lifeng	程立峰	New	1964	—	Hebei	Han	Male	
Chi Yaoyun	迟耀云	New	1965	1986	Shandong	Han	Male	
Cui Peng	崔鹏	Old	1964	1991	Tianjin	Han	Male	
Fan Dazhi	樊大志	New	1964	1986	Jilin	Han	Male	
Fang Lingmin	房灵敏	Old	1964	1983	Shandong	Han	Male	
Feng Zhili	冯志礼	Old	1962	1982	Zhejiang	Han	Male	
Fu Kui	傅奎	Old	1962	1983	Hubei	Han	Male	
Fu Mingxian	傅明先	New	1964	1991	Qingdao	Han	Male	
Gao Bo	高波	New	1964	—	Shandong	Han	Male	
Gao Fei	高飞	New	1972	1995	Chongqing	Miao	Male	
Gong Tanghua	龚堂华	Old	1965	—	Fujian	Han	Male	
Guo Wenqi	郭文奇	New	1963	1984	Hebei	Han	Male	
Han Xianfeng	韩宪锋	New	—	—	—	Han	Male	
Hang Yuanxiang	杭元祥	New	1964	—	—	Han	Male	
Hou Kai	侯凯	Old	1962	1987	Shenyang	Han	Male	
Hou Ximin	侯淅珉	New	1963	1998	Henan	Han	Male	
Hu Yuhai	胡瑜海	New	—	—	—	Han	Male	
Huang Liangbo	黄良波	New	1964	1986	Hunan	Han	Male	
Jiang Xinjun	姜新军	New	1969	—	—	Han	Male	
La Yifan	腊翊凡	New	1967	1988	Henan	Han	Male	
Leng Shaojie	冷少杰	New	1963	—	—	Han	Male	
Li Jianming	李建明	Old	1963	1982	Wuhan	Han	Male	
Li Jinying	李金英	New	1964	1987	Hebei	Hui	Female	
Li Jun	李军	New	1963	—	Hubei	Han	Male	
Li Xi	李希	New	1956	1982	Gansu	Han	Male	
Li Xinran	李欣然	Old	1972	1994	Liaoning	Manchu	Male	
Li Yangzhe	李仰哲	Old	1962	1986	Shaanxi	Han	Male	
Li Yingchun	李迎春	New	—	—	—	Han	Male	
Li Yuanping	李元平	New	1962	1984	Shanxi	Han	Male	
Li Zhaozong	李兆宗	New	—	—	—	Han	Male	
Liao Jianyu	廖建宇	Old	1964	—	—	Han	Male	
Liao Xiyuan	廖西元	New	1964	1996	Hubei	Han	Male	
Lin Guoyao	林国耀	Old	1966	1990	Fujian	Han	Male	
Liu Changlin	刘昌林	Old	1962	1985	Chongqing	Han	Male	
Liu Haiquan	刘海泉	Old	1964	1994	Shandong	Han	Male	
Liu Jinguo	刘金国	Old	1955	1975	Hebei	Han	Male	
Liu Jun	刘军	New	—	—	—	Han	Male	
Liu Junchuan	刘军川	New	1963	1985	Henan	Han	Male	
Liu Meipin	刘美频	New	1969	1990	Hubei	Han	Male	
Liu Qifan	刘奇凡	Old	1967	1994	Guizhou	Han	Male	
Liu Shuang	刘爽	New	1969	1988	Liaoning	Han	Male	
Liu Xuexin	刘学新	Old	1963	1985	Shandong	Han	Male	
Liu Xunyan	刘训言	New	—	—	—	Han	Male	
Liu Zhao	刘炤	New	1963	1985	Hebei	Han	Male	
Lou Chunsi	娄纯泗	New	—	—	—	Han	Male	
Lu Junhua	陆俊华	Old	1962	1987	Jiangxi	Han	Male	
Lyu Yansong	吕岩松	New	1967	1995	Heilongjiang	Han	Male	
Ma Senshu	马森述	New	1965	1993	Shandong	Han	Male	
Ma Xuedi	马学蒂	New	—	—	—	Han	Male	
Miao Wenjiang	缪文江	New	—	—	—	Han	Male	
Mo Yongcheng	莫永成	New	—	—	—	Han	Male	
Mu Hongyu	穆红玉	Old	1963	1984	Shandong	Han	Female	
Pu Yufei	蒲宇飞	New	1971	1992	Jilin	Han	Male	
Qin Bin	秦斌	New	1968	1989	Guangxi	Han	Male	
Qu Jishan	曲吉山	New	1965	—	—	Han	Male	
Qu Xiaoli	曲孝丽	New	1963	1990	Shandong	Han	Female	
Ren Airong	任爱荣	New	1963	1984	Shandong	Han	Female	
Ren Hongbin	任洪斌	New	1963	1985	Jilin	Han	Male	
Ren Hongbin	任鸿斌	New	1966	1985	Chongqing	Tujia	Male	
Shen Xiaohui	沈晓晖	Old	—	—	—	Han	Male	
Shi Kehui	施克辉	Old	1961	1985	Zhejiang	Han	Male	
Song Demin	宋德民	New	1963	1985	Jilin	Han	Male	
Song Fulong	宋福龙	Old	1964	1990	Hebei	Han	Male	
Song Hansong	宋寒松	New	1962	1986	Hebei	Han	Male	
Song Yijia	宋依佳	New	1963	1995	Shanghai	Han	Female	
Sun Bin	孙斌	Old	—	—	—	Han	Male	
Sun Huaixin	孙怀新	Old	1962	1991	Anhui	Han	Male	
Sun Xinyang	孙新阳	New	1964	1988	Shaanxi	Han	Male	
Sun Yegang	孙也刚	Old	1963	1985	Jiangxi	Han	Male	
Teng Jiacai	滕佳材	Old	1964	1985	Liaoning	Han	Male	
Tiang Xiangli	田湘利	New	1962	1984	Jiangsu	Han	Male	
Tu Gengxin	涂更新	New	1964	1987	Jiangxi	Han	Male	
Wan Min	万敏	New	—	—	—	Han	Male	
Wang Aiwen	王爱文	New	1962	1985	Hebei	Han	Male	
Wang Changsong	王常松	Old	1962	1985	Anhui	Han	Male	
Wang Chengwen	王承文	New	1966	1994	Shandong	Han	Male	
Wang Fu	王赋	New	1962	1985	Shanxi	Han	Male	
Wang Hongjin	王鸿津	Old	1963	1985	Shandong	Han	Male	
Wang Hongyan	汪鸿雁	Old	—	—	—	Han	Male	
Wang Huimin	王慧敏	New	1965	1994	Henan	Han	Male	
Wang Jianxin	王建新	New	1972	—	Hunan	Han	Male	
Wang Lin	王林	New	1965	—	—	Han	Male	
Wang Lishan	王立山	Old	1961	1982	Shandong	Han	Male	
Wang Lujin	王陆进	New	1968	1995	Jiangsu	Han	Male	
Wang Shuangquan	王双全	New	1963	1983	Sichuan	Han	Male	
Wang Weidong	王卫东	New	1968	1993	Shanxi	Han	Male	
Wang Xiaoping	王晓萍	New	1964	1988	Hubei	Han	Female	
Wang Xingning	王兴宁	Old	1964	1986	Hunan	Han	Male	
Wang Xinzhe	王新哲	New	1964	1987	Hebei	Han	Male	
Wang Yang	汪洋	New	1969	1989	Guizhou	Han	Male	
Wang Yongjun	王拥军	Old	1963	1982	Jiangsu	Han	Male	
Wang Yuwen	王裕文	New	1962	—	—	Han	Male	
Wei Shanzhong	魏山忠	New	1963	1994	Hubei	Han	Male	
Wu Daohuai	吴道槐	Old	1963	1985	Hunan	Han	Male	
Wu Qinghai	吴清海	Old	1962	1992	Shaanxi	Han	Male	
Xi Hua	习骅	New	—	—	—	Han	Male	
Xia Hongmin	夏红民	Old	1961	1981	Hubei	Han	Male	
Xiao Pei	肖培	Old	1961	1985	Jiangsu	Han	Male	
Xu Luode	许罗德	Old	1962	1982	Hunan	Han	Male	
Xu Xianping	许宪平	New	1964	1996	Jilin	Han	Male	
Yang Guozhong	杨国中	New	1963	1984	Sichuan	Han	Male	
Yang Xiaoxiang	杨笑祥	New	1961	—	Anhui	Han	Male	
Yang Yizheng	杨逸铮	New	1966	1992	Shandong	Han	Female	
Ye Min	叶民	New	1965	1988	Jiangsu	Han	Male	
Yin Bai	訚柏	New	1969	1988	Beijing	Naxi	Male	
Yu Hongqiu	喻红秋	Old	1960	1984	Shandong	Han	Female	
Yu Shaoliang	于绍良	New	1964	1991	Hebei	Han	Male	
Yu Yonghong	余永洪	New	—	—	—	Han	Male	
Zhang Aihua	张爱华	New	—	—	—	Han	Male	
Zhang Fuhai	张福海	New	1964	1984	Liaoning	Han	Male	
Zhang Ji	张骥	Old	1963	1984	Hubei	Han	Male	
Zhang Jiwen	张际文	New	1964	1995	Shandong	Han	Male	
Zhang Jun	张军	Old	1965	—	Anhui	Han	Male	
Zhang Min	张敏	Old	1965	1986	Shandong	Han	Female	
Zhang Rongshun	张荣顺	New	1963	—	Nanjing	Han	Male	
Zhang Shengmin	张升民	Old	1958	1979	Shaanxi	Han	Male	
Zhang Shuguang	张曙光	New	—	—	—	Han	Male	
Zhang Tianbao	张天宝	New	—	—	—	Han	Male	
Zhang Wei	张巍	New	1968	1991	Hubei	Han	Male	
Zhang Yiquan	张义全	New	1964	1988	Henan	Han	Male	
Zhang Zhong	张忠	New	1968	1991	Shandong	Han	Male	
Zhao Shiyong	赵世勇	New	1967	1988	Sichuan	Han	Male	
Zheng Qingdong	郑庆东	New	1964	—	Jiangsu	Han	Male	
Zhu Guobiao	朱国标	Old	1963	—	Jiangsu	Han	Male	
Zou Tianjing	邹天敬	New	1963	1985	Shandong	Han	Male	

== See also ==
- Central Commission for Discipline Inspection
