= Yang Xiaochao =

Chinese politician

- 杨晓超
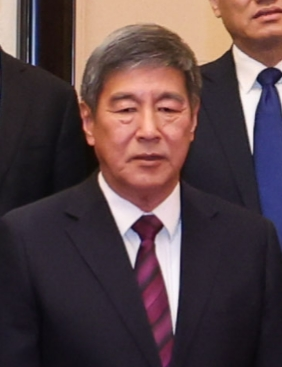

Chairperson of the Supervisory and Judicial Affairs Committee of the National People’s Congress
- Incumbent
- Assumed office March 2023
- Chairman: Zhao Leji
- Preceded by: Wu Yuliang

Secretary General of the Central Commission for Discipline Inspection
- In office July 2015 – September 2022
- Secretary: Wang Qishan; Zhao Leji
- Preceded by: Cui Shaopeng
- Succeeded by: Li Xinran

Personal details
- Born: 15 November 1958 (age 67) Nanjing, Jiangsu, China
- Party: Chinese Communist Party

Yang Xiaochao (Chinese: 杨晓超; born 15 November 1958) is a Chinese politician and senior auditor who spent most of his career in Beijing. He served as the Secretary General of the Central Commission for Discipline Inspection (minister-rank).

== Career ==
Yang was born in November 1958 in Nanjing. In 1977 he took part in rural labour in Pinggu County, Beijing, then went on to attend school at Beijing Economics College (later Capital University of Economics and Business), where he majored in accounting. He then joined the finance department of the city of Beijing, and worked his way up the ranks, until 1994 when he was named deputy director of taxation of Beijing.

In November 2002, he was named auditor general of Beijing, then in February 2008, the head of the city's finance department. In July 2013 he became vice mayor of Beijing, then he was elevated to the municipal Party Standing Committee in August 2014, and took on the position of Secretary of the Beijing Political and Legal Affairs Commission. In July 2015 he was promoted to Secretary General of the Central Commission for Discipline Inspection (minister-rank).

Yang's elevation to the secretary-generalship was seen as unusual since he was promoted from a regional to national level office. He also joined the agency during the height of the anti-corruption campaign. Moreover, he was elevated from a vice-minister-level position to a minister-level position in a mere two years, which is unusual in Chinese politics.

He became the Supervisory and Judicial Affairs Committee and Head of the China-Thailand Friendship Group during the 14th National People's Congress.

Party political offices
Preceded by Cui Shaopeng	Secretary General of the Central Commission for Discipline Inspection; 2015–present	Succeeded by Li Xinran
