= Standing Committee of the 20th Central Commission for Discipline Inspection =

Chinese government committee

The Standing Committee of the 20th electoral term of the Central Commission for Discipline Inspection (CCDI) was elected by the CCDI's 1st Plenary Session on 23 October and approved by the 20th Central Committee at its 1st Plenary Session later that same day. The Standing Committee is composed of the CCDI secretary, deputy secretaries, secretary-general and other members.

== Composition ==
Members of the Standing Committee of the 20th Central Commission for Discipline Inspection
Name	Hanzi	19th STC	Birth	PM	Birthplace	Ethnicity	Gender	Ref.
Chen Guoqiang	陈国强	New	1963	1983	Hebei	Han	Male	
Fu Kui	傅奎	New	1962	1983	Hubei	Han	Male	
Hou Kai	侯凯	Old	1962	1987	Shenyang	Han	Male	
Li Xi	李希	New	1956	1982	Gansu	Han	Male	
Li Xinran	李欣然	New	1972	1994	Liaoning	Manchu	Male	
Liu Jinguo	刘金国	Old	1955	1975	Hebei	Han	Male	
Liu Xuexin	刘学新	New	1963	1985	Shandong	Han	Male	
Mu Hongyu	穆红玉	New	1963	1984	Shandong	Han	Female	
Sun Xinyang	孙新阳	New	1964	1988	Shaanxi	Han	Male	
Wang Aiwen	王爱文	New	1962	1985	Hebei	Han	Male	
Wang Hongjin	王鸿津	Old	1963	1985	Shandong	Han	Male	
Wang Xiaoping	王晓萍	New	1964	1988	Hubei	Han	Female	
Xiao Pei	肖培	Old	1961	1985	Jiangsu	Han	Male	
Xu Luode	许罗德	New	1962	1982	Hunan	Han	Male	
Yin Bai	訚柏	New	1969	1988	Beijing	Naxi	Male	
Yu Hongqiu	喻红秋	New	1960	1984	Shandong	Han	Female	
Zhang Fuhai	张福海	New	1964	1984	Liaoning	Han	Male	
Zhang Shengmin	张升民	Old	1958	1979	Shaanxi	Han	Male	
Zhao Shiyong	赵世勇	New	1967	1988	Sichuan	Han	Male	

== See also ==
- Central Commission for Discipline Inspection
