= Zhou Liang =

Chinese politician (born 1971)

- 周亮

Deputy Director of the National Financial Regulatory Administration
- In office May 2023 – March 2026

Vice Chairman of the China Banking and Insurance Regulatory Commission
- In office May 2018 – May 2023

Vice Chairman of the China Banking Regulatory Commission
- In office November 2017 – May 2018

Head of the Organization Department of the Central Commission for Discipline Inspection
- In office August 2015 – November 2017
- Preceded by: Zhang Lijun
- Succeeded by: Liu Shuang

Personal details
- Born: October 1971 (age 54) Yongzhou, Hunan, China
- Party: Chinese Communist Party (1995-)

Zhou Liang (Chinese: 周亮; born October 1971) is a former Chinese politician, who was served as the deputy director of the National Financial Regulatory Administration from 2023 to 2026. Zhou was a delegate to the 19th National Congress of the Chinese Communist Party and a member of the 19th Central Commission for Discipline Inspection.

== Career ==
Zhou Liang was born in Yongzhou, Hunan. He was served as Wang Qishan's assistant for a long time since 1996.

In 2015, Zhou was appointed as the head of the Organization Department of the Central Commission for Discipline Inspection.

In November 2017, Zhou was appointed as the vice chairman of the China Banking Regulatory Commission. After the commission was re-established as the China Banking and Insurance Regulatory Commission in 2018, Zhou still served as the vice chairman. In 2023, Zhou was served as the deputy director of the National Financial Regulatory Administration.

== Investigation ==
On 24 March 2026, Zhou was suspected of "serious violations of laws and regulations" by the Central Commission for Discipline Inspection (CCDI), the party's internal disciplinary body, and the National Supervisory Commission, the highest anti-corruption agency of China.

Party political offices
Preceded by Zhang Lijun	Head of the Organization Department of the Central Commission for Discipline Inspection; 2015－2017	Succeeded by Liu Shuang
