= 19th Central Commission for Discipline Inspection =

The 19th Central Commission for Discipline Inspection (19th CCDI) of the Chinese Communist Party (CCP) was elected by the CCP's 19th National Congress on 24 October 2017, and its turn lasts until the convocation of the 20th National Congress in 2022. The CCDI is composed of 133 members. A member has voting rights. To be elected to the CCDI, a candidate must be a party member for at least five years.

The 1st Plenary Session in 2017 was responsible for electing the bodies in which the authority of the Central Commission for Discipline Inspection was invested when it was not in session: the 19th Standing Committee. It was also responsible for electing the CCDI Secretary.

== Keys ==
Abbreviations
IDUCC	Institutions Directly Under the Central Committee
K	Keys
CIM	Central institution membership, which in this instance means membership in the PSC, PB, ST and CMC
PSC	Standing Committee of the Political Bureau
PB	Political Bureau
ST	Secretariat
CMC	Central Military Commission
SC–CCDI	Standing Committee of the Central Commission for Discipline Inspection
CCDI	Central Commission for Discipline Inspection
CPPCC	Chinese People's Political Consultative Conference
NL	National Leader
DNL	Deputy National Leader
PM	Provincial-Ministerial
SPM	Sub-provincial (vice-ministerial)
DE	Department-prefecture level
Adm.	Admiral
V-Adm.	Vice-Admiral
Gen.	General
Lt. Gen.	Lieutenant General
Maj. Gen.	Major General
Keys
♀	Indicates that the individual is female.
↑	Indicates that the individual was elevated from alternate to member at the 4th Plenary Session.
♮	Indicates that the individual was expelled from the Communist Party after CCDI investigation.
₪	Indicates that the individual is currently under investigation by the CCDI.
∞	Indicates that the individual is retired from active political positions.
§	Indicates that the individual is military personnel.
↔	Indicates that the individual is military personnel and has retired from active military service.
Note	If two keys are used in the same column it indicates that the individual is both of something. For instance, "♀§" indicates that the individual is female (♀) and military personnel (§).

== Members ==
Hanzi	Name	Yob	K	Ethnicity	Office	Rank
丁兴农	Ding Xingnong	1958	§	Han	—	—
马奔	Ma Ben	1958	—	Han	—	—
王东海	Wang Donghai	1960	—	Han	—	—
王立山	Wang Lishan		—	Han	—	—
王成蔚	Wang Chengwei		—	Han	—	—
王兴宁	Wang Xingning	1964	—	Han	—	—
王希明	Wang Ximing		§	Han	—	—
王拥军	Wang Yongjun	1963	—	Han	—	—
王荣军	Wang Rongjun	1959	—	Han	—	—
王宾宜	Wang Binyi	1956	—	Han	—	—
王常松	Wang Changsong	1962	—	Han	—	—
王鸿津	Wang Hongjin	1963	—	Han	—	—
王雁飞	Wang Yanfei	1963	—	Han	—	—
方北群	Fang Beiqun		§	Han	—	—
方荣堂	Fang Rongtang		—	Han	—	—
邓卫平	Deng Weiping	1955	—	Han	—	—
邓中华	Deng Zhonghua	1958	—	Han	—	—
邓修明	Deng Xiuming	1964	—	Han	—	—
艾俊涛	Ai Juntao	1965	—	Han	—	—
卢希	Lu Xi	1959	♀	Han	—	—
田野	Tian Ye	1973	—	Han	—	—
田静	Tian Jing	1960	—	Han	—	—
白吕	Bai Lyu	1961	§	Han	—	—
白少康	Bai Shaokang	1962	—	Han	—	—
冯志礼	Feng Zhili	1962	—	Han	—	—
朱国贤	Zhu Guoxian		—	Han	—	—
朱国标	Zhu Guobiao		§	Han	—	—
任正晓	Ren Zhengxiao	1959	—	Han	—	—
任建华	Ren Jianhua	1965	—	Han	—	—
刘昆	Liu Kun	1956	—	Han	—	—
刘实	Liu Shi	1959	—	Han	—	—
刘建	Liu Jian		—	Han	—	—
刘惠	Liu Hui		—	Han	—	—
刘化龙	Liu Hualong	1962	—	Han	—	—
刘文军	Liu Wenjun		—	Han	—	—
刘奇凡	Liu Qifan	1967	—	Han	—	—
刘昌林	Liu Changlin	1962	—	Han	—	—
刘金国	Liu Jinguo	1955	—	Han	—	—
刘学新	Liu Xuexin	1963	—	Han	—	—
刘建超	Liu Jianchao	1964	—	Han	—	—
刘海泉	Liu Haiquan		—	Han	—	—
刘德伟	Liu Dewei		—	Han	—	—
江金权	Jiang Jinquan		—	Han	—	—
许传智	Xu Chuanzhi		—	Han	—	—
许罗德	Xu Luode		—	Han	—	—
孙斌	Sun Bin		—	Han	—	—
孙也刚	Sun Yegang		—	Han	—	—
孙怀新	Sun Huaixin		—	Han	—	—
孙新阳	Sun Xinyang		—	Han	—	—
苏德良	Su Deliang	1960	—	Han	—	—
李书磊	Li Shulei	1964	—	Han	—	—
李仰哲	Li Yangzhe		—	Han	—	—
李欣然	Li Xinran		—	Manchu	—	—
李宝善	Li Baoshan		—	Han	—	—
李建明	Li Jianming		—	Han	—	—
李清杰	Li Qingjie		—	Han	—	—
杨宇栋	Yang Yudong		—	Han	—	—
杨晓超	Yang Xiaochao	1958	—	Han	—	—
杨晓渡	Yang Xiaodu	1953	—	Han	—	—
肖培	Xiao Pei		—	Han	—	—
吴志铭	Wu Zhiming		—	Han	—	—
吴海英	Wu Haiying	—	♀	Han	—	—
吴清海	Wu Qinghai		—	Han	—	—
吴道槐	Wu Daohuai		—	Han	—	—
何平	He Ping		—	Han	—	—
邹加怡	Zou Jiayi	—	♀	Han	—	—
库热西·买合苏提	Kuresh Mahsut		—	Uyghur	—	—
辛维光	Xin Weiguang		—	Han	—	—
汪利平	Wang Liping		—	Han	—	—
汪鸿雁	Wang Hongyan		—	Han	—	—
沈晓晖	Shen Xiaohui		—	Han	—	—
宋鸿喜	Song Hongxi		—	Han	—	—
宋福龙	Song Fulong		—	Han	—	—
迟耀云	Chi Yaoyun		—	Han	—	—
张军	Zhang Jun		—	Han	—	—
张敏	Zhang Min	—	♀	Han	—	—
张骥	Zhang Ji		—	Han	—	—
张升民	Zhang Shengmin		—	Han	—	—
张务锋	Zhang Wufeng		—	Han	—	—
张春生	Zhang Chunsheng		—	Han	—	—
张硕辅	Zhang Shuofu		—	Han	—	—
陆俊华	Lu Junhua		—	Han	—	—
陈雍	Chen Yong		—	Manchu	—	—
陈小江	Chen Xiaojiang		—	Han	—	—
陈国猛	Chen Guomeng		—	Han	—	—
陈学斌	Chen Xuebin		—	Han	—	—
陈超英	Chen Chaoying		—	Han	—	—
陈辐宽	Chen Fukuan		—	Han	—	—
邵峰	Shao Feng		—	Han	—	—
林国耀	Lin Guoyao		—	Han	—	—
罗东川	Luo Dongchuan		—	Han	—	—
周亮	Zhou Liang		—	Han	—	—
周小莹	Zhou Xiaoying	—	♀	Han	—	—
郑国光	Zheng Guoguang		—	Han	—	—
郑振涛	Zheng Zhentao		—	Han	—	—
房灵敏	Fang Lingmin		—	Han	—	—
房建孟	Fang Jianmeng		—	Han	—	—
赵乐际	Zhao Leji	1957	—	Han	—	—
赵惠令	Zhao Huiling		—	Han	—	—
侯凯	Hou Kai		—	Han	—	—
施克辉	Shi Kehui		—	Han	—	—
姜信治	Jiang Xinzhi		—	Han	—	—
贺荣	He Rong	—	♀	Han	—	—
骆源	Luo Yuan	1950	§	Han	—	—
耿文清	Geng Wenqing		—	Han	—	—
贾育林	Jia Yulin		—	Han	—	—
夏红民	Xia Hongmin		—	Han	—	—
徐令义	Xu Lingyi		—	Han	—	—
徐加爱	Xu Jia'ai		—	Han	—	—
凌激	Ling Ji		—	Han	—	—
郭开朗	Guo Kailang		—	Han	—	—
陶治国	Tao Zhiguo		—	Han	—	—
龚堂华	Gong Tanghua		—	Han	—	—
崔鹏	Cui Peng		—	Han	—	—
章建华	Zhang Jianhua		—	Han	—	—
梁惠玲	Liang Huiling	—	♀	Han	—	—
蒋卓庆	Jiang Zhuoqing		—	Han	—	—
蒋洪军	Jiang Hongjun		—	Han	—	—
喻红秋	Yu Hongqiu	—	♀	Han	—	—
傅奎	Fu Kui		—	Han	—	—
舒国增	Shu Guozeng		—	Han	—	—
曾益新	Zeng Yixin		—	Han	—	—
谢杭生	Xie Hangsheng	1955	—	Han	—	—
谢新义	Xie Xinyi		—	Han	—	—
蓝佛安	Lan Fo'an		—	Han	—	—
蒲增繁	Pu Zengfan		—	Han	—	—
蔡永中	Cai Yongzhong		—	Li	—	—
廖国勋	Liao Guoxun		—	Tujia	—	—
廖建宇	Liao Jianyu		—	Han	—	—
滕佳材	Teng Jiacai		—	Han	—	—
潘盛洲	Pan Shengzhou		—	Han	—	—
穆红玉	Mu Hongyu	—	♀	Han	—	—
戴均良	Dai Junliang		—	Han	—	—
