= Tan Jian =

Tan Jian may refer to:

- Tan Jian (discus thrower)
- Tan Jian (diplomat)
