= Liu Wenxin =

Chinese politician (born 1967)

- 刘文新

Communist Party Secretary of Qianxinan Buyei and Miao Autonomous Prefecture
- In office 5 August 2017 – 20 March 2022
- Preceded by: Zhang Zheng
- Succeeded by: Chen Changxu

Mayor of Guiyang
- In office November 2013 – 18 September 2017
- Preceded by: Li Zaiyong
- Succeeded by: Chen Yan

Personal details
- Born: May 1967 (age 59) Pingxiang, Jiangxi, China
- Party: Chinese Communist Party
- Education: Xiuwen Normal School; Central Party School of the Chinese Communist Party

Chinese name
- Simplified Chinese: 刘文新
- Traditional Chinese: 劉文新
Transcriptions
Standard Mandarin
- Hanyu Pinyin: Liú Wénxīn

Liu Wenxin (Chinese: 刘文新; born May 1967) is a former Chinese politician who spent most of his career in southwest China's Guizhou province. As of October 2022 he was under investigation by China's top anti-corruption agency. He served as mayor of Guiyang from 2013 to 2017 and party secretary of Qianxinan Buyei and Miao Autonomous Prefecture from 2017 to 2022.

== Early life and education ==
Liu was born in Pingxiang, Jiangxi, in May 1967. After graduating from Xiuwen Normal School in 1985, he taught at Majiaqiao Middle School. From September 2007 to July 2010 he did his postgraduate work at the Central Party School of the Chinese Communist Party.

== Political career ==
Starting in 1989, Liu served in several posts in Xiuwen County, including staff member of Xiuwen County Judicial Bureau, lawyer of Xiuwen County Law Firm, judge and president of Xiuwen County Court, and party secretary of Longchang Town. He joined the Chinese Communist Party (CCP) in May 1995. He was head of the Publicity Department of the CCP Xiuwen County Committee in February 2001 and subsequently head of the Organization Department of the CCP Xiuwen County Committee in May 2001.

Liu was transferred to southwest China's Guizhou province in May 2002 and appointed secretary of Guiyang Municipal Committee of the Communist Youth League of China. In March 2005, he became deputy head of the Organization Department of the CCP Guiyang Municipal Committee, concurrently serving as directed of Guiyang Distance Education Office since September of that same year. He was deputy party secretary of Nanming District in May 2006, in addition to serving as governor. He was appointed head of the United Front Work Department of the CCP Guiyang Municipal Committee in December 2006 and was admitted to member of the Standing Committee of the CCP Guiyang Municipal Committee, the capital city's top authority. In June 2011, he became vice mayor of Guiyang, rising to mayor in January 2014.

In August 2017, Liu was chosen as party secretary of Qianxinan Buyei and Miao Autonomous Prefecture, and served until March 2022.

In March 2022, Liu was made secretary of the Political and Legal Affairs Commission of the CCP Guizhou Provincial Committee.

== Investigation ==
On 26 October 2022, Liu was put under investigation for alleged "serious violations of discipline and laws" by the Central Commission for Discipline Inspection (CCDI), the party's internal disciplinary body, and the National Supervisory Commission, the highest anti-corruption agency of China.

Government offices
Preceded by Li Zaiyong	Mayor of Guiyang; 2013–2017	Succeeded by Chen Yan
Party political offices
Preceded by Zhang Zheng	Communist Party Secretary of Qianxinan Buyei and Miao Autonomous Prefecture; 2017–2022	Succeeded by Chen Changxu
