= Cui Shaopeng =

Chinese politician

Cui Shaopeng (Chinese: 崔少鹏; born October 1961) is a Chinese politician and a discipline official of the Chinese Communist Party. Since January 2015 he has served as the Discipline Inspection Secretary of Jilin Province.

== Early life ==
In October 1961, Cui was born and raised in Beijing, China. Cui spent some time during the latter stages of the Cultural Revolution working as a sent-down youth in Yuanshi County, Hebei.

== Education ==
Cui obtained a philosophy degree at Jilin University and a master's degree in engineering. After graduating he joined the Communist Party in June 1985, and the served in a series of roles in various central party organizations in Beijing.

== Career ==
Cui worked for the Working Committee of Organs Directly Reporting to the Central Committee, the Research Office of the Organization Department, an Organization Department performance assessment official, and a publicity official. Then he was transferred to the General Office of the Chinese Communist Party. After that he became head of the Publicity and Education Office of the Central Commission for Discipline Inspection. In May 2011 he was appointed Secretary-General of the Central Commission for Discipline Inspection. In November 2012, he was elected a Standing Committee Member of the Central Commission for Discipline Inspection.

On January 17, 2015, Cui returned to the province where he attended school, and was named a member of the Chinese Communist Party Provincial Standing Committee of Jilin province, and the Secretary of the Jilin Provincial Discipline Inspection Commission.

Party political offices
Preceded by Wu Yuliang	Secretary-General of the Central Commission for Discipline Inspection; 2012–2015	Succeeded by Yang Xiaochao
