= Sun Hongzhi =

Chinese politician (born 1965)

- 孙鸿志
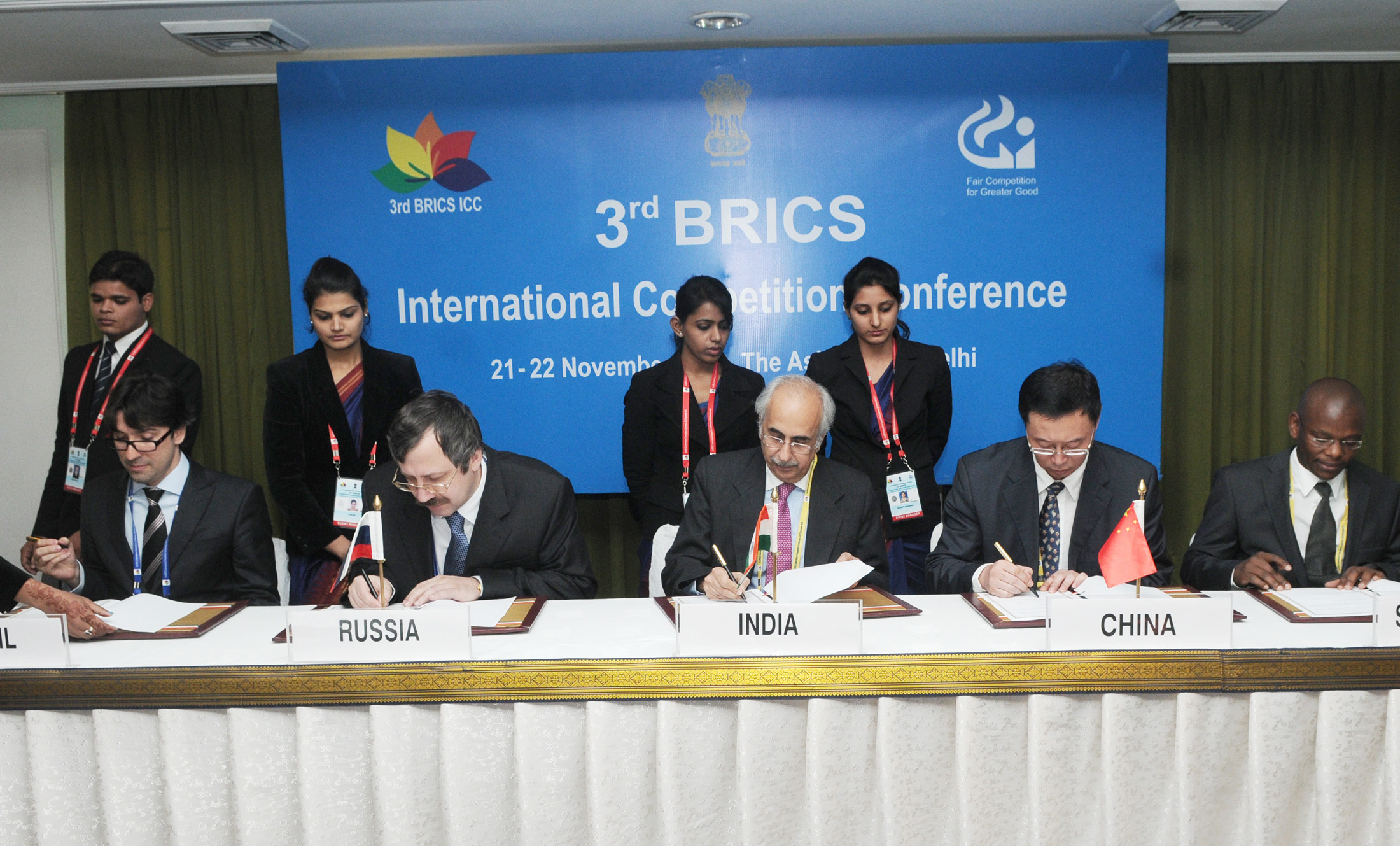
- The Chairman, Competition Commission of India, Shri Ashok Chawla, the Vice Minister, China, Mr. Sun Hongzhi, the Commissioner CADE, Brazil, Mr. Alessandro Serafin Octaviani Luis, the Acting Commissioner, CCSA, South Africa

Vice-Minister of the State Administration for Industry and Commerce
- In office May 2013 – December 2014
- Leader: Zhou Bohua (minister)

Mayor of Songyuan
- In office December 2006 – December 2010
- Preceded by: Lan Jun
- Succeeded by: Wang Changsong

Personal details
- Born: September 1965 (age 61) Jiaohe, Jilin, China
- Party: Chinese Communist Party (1986–2015; expelled)
- Education: Liaoning Technical University; Jilin University

Chinese name
- Traditional Chinese: 孫鴻志
- Simplified Chinese: 孙鸿志
Transcriptions
Standard Mandarin
- Hanyu Pinyin: Sūn Hóngzhì

Sun Hongzhi (born September 1965) is a Chinese politician who spent most of his career in Northeast China's Jilin province. As of December 2014 he was under investigation by the Communist Party's anti-corruption agency. At the time of his investigation, Sun served as the Vice-Minister of the State Administration for Industry and Commerce (SAIC).

Sun was a member of the 11th National People's Congress.

== Life and career ==
Sun was born and raised in Jiaohe, Jilin. He became involved in politics and joined the Chinese Communist Party in July 1986.

He graduated from Liaoning Technical University. On leaving university in 1990, he worked at Inner Mongolia Coal Industry Company as an engineer.

He served in various posts in Changchun Coal Technology Center before serving as the deputy head of the Coal Industry Bureau of Jilin in July 2001.

He entered Jilin University in September 1999, majoring in management at the College of Management, where he graduated in July 2004.

He served as Head and deputy party branch secretary of the Coal Industry Bureau of Jilin from September 2004 to January 2005, and party branch secretary, from January 2005 to March 2006.

In March 2006, he was named acting mayor of Songyuan, and served as deputy Communist Party secretary. At the same time as holding the post of Mayor between December 2006 to December 2010.

In January 2011, he was transferred to Beijing and worked in State Administration for Industry and Commerce (SAIC), he was promoted to vice-minister in May 2013.

== Downfall ==
On December 26, 2014, the state media reported that he was being investigated by the Central Commission for Discipline Inspection of the Chinese Communist Party for "serious violations of laws and regulations". Sun was expelled from the Communist Party on June 15, 2015. The party investigation concluded that Sun "hid his activities from the organization," used official vehicles for personal reasons, used public funds for food, lodging, and travelling, solicited and accepted "massive bribes", and "adultery".

On February 17, 2017, Sun was sentenced to 18 years in prison for taking bribes worth 14.20 million yuan (~$2.07 million), plundering the public treasury worth 1.64 million yuan (~$0.24 million) and unidentified 9.53 million yuan (~$1.39 million) property in Tai'an People's Intermediate Court.

Government offices
Preceded by Lan Jun	Mayor of Songyuan; 2006–2010	Succeeded by Wang Changsong
