= Liuzhi =

Liuzhi may refer to:

- Liuzhi (detention), an extrajudicial detention system used by the Central Commission for Discipline Inspection in China
- Liuzhi Special District, an administrative division in Guizhou, China
