= Chen Yan (politician, born 1963) =

Chinese politician

- 陈晏

Vice Chairman of the Guizhou Provincial Committee of the Chinese People's Political Consultative Conference
- In office January 2021 – March 2024
- Chairman: Liu Xiaokai; Zhao Yongqing

Mayor of Guiyang
- In office September 2017 – October 2021
- Preceded by: Liu Wenxin
- Succeeded by: Ma Ningyu

Mayor of Tongren
- In office August 2015 – September 2017
- Preceded by: Xia Qingfeng
- Succeeded by: Chen Shaorong

Personal details
- Born: August 1963 (age 63) Suzhou, Jiangsu, China
- Party: Chinese Communist Party (1986–2024; expelled)
- Education: Renmin University of China

Chinese name
- Simplified Chinese: 陈晏
- Traditional Chinese: 陳晏
Transcriptions
Standard Mandarin
- Hanyu Pinyin: Chén Yàn

Chen Yan (Chinese: 陈晏; born August 1963) is a former Chinese politician who spent his entire career in southwest China's Guizhou province. As of March 2024 he was under investigation by China's top anti-graft watchdog. Previously he served as vice chairman of the Guizhou Provincial Committee of the Chinese People's Political Consultative Conference and before that, mayor of Guiyang and mayor of Tongren.

Chen was a delegate to the 13th National People's Congress.

== Early life and education ==
Chen was born in Suzhou, Jiangsu, in August 1963. In 1982, he enrolled at the Renmin University of China, where he majored in national economic planning. He joined the Chinese Communist Party (CCP) in March 1986.

== Career ==
After university in 1986, Chen was despatched to the Guizhou Provincial Planning Commission (now Guizhou Provincial Development and Reform Commission), where he served in several posts and spent 25 years there. In July 2011, he became vice mayor of Tongren, rising to mayor in January 2016. In September 2017, he was named acting mayor of Guiyang, succeeding Liu Wenxin. In January 2021, he was chosen as vice chairman of the Guizhou Provincial Committee of the Chinese People's Political Consultative Conference, the provincial advisory body.

== Downfall ==
On 25 March 2024, Chen has been placed under investigation for "serious violations of laws and regulations" by the Central Commission for Discipline Inspection (CCDI), the party's internal disciplinary body, and the National Supervisory Commission, the highest anti-corruption agency of China. On October 11, he was stripped of his posts within the CCP and in the public office. On October 21, he was arrested on suspicion of taking bribes as per a decision made by the Supreme People's Procuratorate.

On 22 February 2025, he was indicted on suspicion of accepting bribes. On September 29, he was sentenced to death with a two-year reprieve for taking bribes worth more than 357 million yuan ($50.14 million). He was deprived of his political rights for life, and all his personal assets were confiscated.

Party political offices
| Preceded by Xia Qingfeng | Mayor of Tongren; 2015–2017 | Succeeded by Chen Shaorong |
Government offices
| Preceded by Liu Wenxin | Mayor of Guiyang; 2017–2021 | Succeeded by Ma Ningyu |
