= Xu Chuanzhi =

- 许传智

Secretary of the Discipline Inspection Committee of the Ningxia Hui Autonomous Regional Committee of the Chinese Communist Party
- In office May 2016 – November 2019
- Preceded by: Chen Xuguo
- Succeeded by: Ai Juntao

Personal details
- Born: February 1957 (age 69) Zhucheng County, Shandong, China
- Party: Chinese Communist Party (1978-2026, expelled)
- Education: Northeast Normal University

Chinese name
- Simplified Chinese: 许传智
- Traditional Chinese: 許傳智
Transcriptions
Standard Mandarin
- Hanyu Pinyin: Xǔ Chuánzhì

Xu Chuanzhi (Chinese: 许传智; born February 1957) is a retired Chinese politician. As of October 2025 he was under investigation by China's top anti-graft watchdog. He has been retired for almost 6 years. Previously he served as secretary of the Discipline Inspection Committee of the Ningxia Hui Autonomous Regional Committee of the Chinese Communist Party and director of the Supervisory Commission of Ningxia Hui Autonomous Region.

Xu was a delegate to the 13th National People's Congress, a representative of the 19th National Congress of the Chinese Communist Party, and a member of the 19th Central Commission for Discipline Inspection.

== Early life and education ==
Xu was born in Zhucheng County (now Zhucheng), Shandong, in February 1957. During the late period of the Cultural Revolution from September 1975 to March 1978, he successively served as a sent-down youth, private teacher, and substitute teacher in Chalsen Commune, Keyouqian Banner, Inner Mongolia. After resuming the college entrance examination, in 1978, he enrolled at Northeast Normal University, where he majored in Chinese language and literature. He joined the Chinese Communist Party (CCP) in August 1978, during his freshman year.

== Career ==
After university in February 1982, Xu was assigned as an official in the 5th Discipline Inspection Office of the Central Commission for Discipline Inspection. In February 1987, he was transferred to the Cadre Office of the Central Commission for Discipline Inspection, where he successively served as director general, deputy director of the Cadre Department, deputy director of the Second Cadre Department, and director of the Second Cadre Department. In May 1998, he was transferred again to the Beijing Training Center of the Central Commission for Discipline Inspection as deputy director, and was promoted to director eight years later. He was director of the Supervision Office of the Liaison Office of the Central People's Government in Macau in May 2009, in addition to serving as director of the Central Commission for Discipline Inspection's Office for Correcting Unhealthy Practices in Departments and Industries since December 2011. He was director of the Party and Government Conduct Supervision Office of the Central Commission for Discipline Inspection in May 2013 and subsequently leader of the Discipline Inspection Group of the Central Commission for Discipline Inspection stationed at the State Ethnic Affairs Commission in April 2015.

Xu was transferred to northwest China's Ningxia Hui Autonomous Region in April 2016, where he was appointed secretary of the Regional Discipline Inspection Committee and was admitted to standing committee member of the CCP Ningxia Hui Autonomous Regional Committee, the region's top authority. In January 2018, he concurrently served as director of the Regional Supervisory Commission.

== Downfall ==
On 14 October 2025, Xu was put under investigation for alleged "serious violations of discipline and laws" by the Central Commission for Discipline Inspection (CCDI), the party's internal disciplinary body, and the National Supervisory Commission, the highest anti-corruption agency of China. Xu was expelled from the party on 4 January 2026.

On 8 October 2026, Xu was sentenced to 12 years and fined 2.5 million yuan at the Ningbo Intermediate People's Court, for taking bribes and taking bribes by exploiting one's influence in 36.59 million yuan.

Party political offices
Preceded by Chen Xuguo	Secretary of the Discipline Inspection Committee of the Ningxia Hui Autonomous Regional Committee of the Chinese Communist Party; 2016–2019	Succeeded by Ai Juntao
