= List of ambassadors of China to Ethiopia =

The ambassador of China to Ethiopia is the official representative of the People's Republic of China to Ethiopia.

== List of representatives ==
Name (English)	Name (Chinese)	Tenure begins	Tenure ends	Note
Wang Yimu	王一木	February 1971	11 May 1971	
Yu Peiwen	俞沛文	May 1971	17 July 1974	
Yang Shouzheng	杨守正	December 1974	3 August 1977	
Wang Jinchuan	王锦川	November 1977	January 1981	
Zhao Yuan	赵源	November 1982	2 June 1985	
Zhang Ruijie	张瑞杰	July 1985	June 1987	
Gu Jiaji	顾家骥	August 1987	May 1991	
Jin Sen	金森	March 1992	November 1996	
Jiang Zhengyun	蒋正云	December 1996	February 2001	
Ai Ping	艾平	March 2001	July 2004	
Lin Lin	林琳	September 2004	May 2008	
Gu Xiaojie	顾小杰	June 2008	November 2011	
Xie Xiaoyan	解晓岩	November 2011	February 2015	
La Yifan	腊翊凡	February 2015	August 2017	
Tan Jian	谈践	December 2017	September 2020	
Zhao Zhiyuan	赵志远	October 2020		

== See also ==
- China–Ethiopia relations
