= Secretary General of the Central Commission for Discipline Inspection =

Chinese communist party official

Secretary General of the Central Commission for Discipline Inspection of the Chinese Communist Party 中国共产党中央纪律检查委员会秘书长
- Emblem of the Chinese Communist Party
- Incumbent; Li Xinran since September 2022
- Residence: Zhongnanhai
- Appointer: the plenary session of the Central Commission for Discipline Inspection
- Term length: Five Years
- Website: Central Commission for Discipline Inspection

The secretary general of the Central Commission for Discipline Inspection (Chinese: 中央纪律检查委员会秘书长 or 中纪委秘书长 for short) of the Chinese Communist Party is responsible for administrative management of the CCDI.

== Executive Secretary of the Central Commission for Discipline Inspection (1978–1987) ==
No. (Note: These numbers are not official.)	Name (birth–death)	Hanzi	Took office	Left office	Tenure	Term(s)
1	Huang Kecheng (1902–1986)	黄克诚	22 December 1978	11 September 1982	3 years, 263 days	11th
2	Wang Heshou (1909–1999)	王鹤寿	11 September 1982	1 November 1987	5 years, 51 days	12th

== Secretary General of the Central Commission for Discipline Inspection (1987–present) ==
No.	Name (birth–death)	Hanzi	Took office	Left office	Tenure	Term(s)
3	Wang Deying (born 1931)	王德瑛	1 November 1987	December 1992	5 years, 30 days	13th
4	Wang Guang (born 1930)	王光	December 1992	18 September 1997	4 years, 281 days	14th
5	Yuan Chunqing (born 1952)	袁纯清	October 1997	March 2001	3 years, 151 days	15th
6	Wu Dingfu (born 1946)	吴定富	April 2001	15 November 2002	1 year, 218 days	15th
7	Gan Yisheng (born 1945)	干以胜	15 November 2002	September 2007	4 years, 290 days	16th
8	Zhang Yi (born 1950)	张毅	September	November 2007	61 days	16th, 17th
9	Wu Yuliang (born 1952)	吴玉良	December 2007	June 2012	4 years, 224 days	17th
10	Cui Shaopeng (born 1961)	崔少鹏	15 November 2012	July 2015	2 years, 53 days	18th
11	Yang Xiaochao (born 1958)	杨晓超	July 2015	26 September 2022	7 years, 262 days	18th, 19th
12	Li Xinran (born 1972)	李欣然	26 September 2022	-	3 years, 346 days	19th, 20th
