= La Yifan =

Chinese diplomat

- 腊翊凡

Director of the International Cooperation Bureau, Central Commission for Discipline Inspection
- Incumbent
- Assumed office September 2017
- Preceded by: Liu Jianchao

Chinese Ambassador to Ethiopia
- In office February 2015 – August 2017
- Preceded by: Xie Xiaoyan
- Succeeded by: Tan Jian

Personal details
- Born: 1967 (age 58–59) China
- Party: Chinese Communist Party
- Education: China Foreign Affairs University
- Occupation: Diplomat

Chinese name
- Traditional Chinese: 臘翊凡
- Simplified Chinese: 腊翊凡
Transcriptions
Standard Mandarin
- Hanyu Pinyin: Là Yìfán

La Yifan (Chinese: 腊翊凡; born 1967) is a Chinese diplomat who served as Chinese Ambassador to Ethiopia between 2015 and 2017.

== Biography ==
Born in 1967, La graduated from the China Foreign Affairs University. After university, he was assigned to the Ministry of Foreign Affairs. He served as the deputy director of the Department of Foreign Affairs Management, Ministry of Foreign Affairs before he took office of the Chinese Ambassador to Ethiopia in February 2015. In addition, he was dispatched to work in the Chinese Representative Office in the United Nations Economic and Social Commission for Asia and the Pacific and on the Permanent Mission to the United Nations Office in Geneva. In September 2017, he was appointed director of the International Cooperation Bureau, Central Commission for Discipline Inspection, replacing Liu Jianchao.

Diplomatic posts
Preceded by Xie Xiaoyan (解晓岩)	Chinese Ambassador to Ethiopia; 2015–2017	Succeeded by Tan Jian
Government offices
Preceded by Liu Jianchao	Director of the International Cooperation Bureau, Central Commission for Discipline Inspection; 2017	Incumbent
