= Internal Supervision Regulation =

Chinese Communist Party disciplinary system

The "Internal Supervision Regulation" (ISR) (Chinese: 内部监督规定; pinyin: Nèibù Jiāndū Guīdìng) was promulgated in 2004 to institutionalize the Chinese Communist Party's inner-party supervision system, which is enforced by the Central Commission for Discipline Inspection.

== History ==
The inner-party supervision system was not formalized during Mao Zedong's rule. The leadership emphasized personal responsibility and mobilized members on moralistic campaigns to combat corruption. This changed with Mao's death and Deng Xiaoping's ascension to power. The Dengist approach differed from Mao's in that it sought to establish a supervision system based on formal procedures and party regulations. This was a thoroughgoing change since the Chinese Communist Party (CCP) had been accustomed (and still is to some degree) to the "rule of man" rather than the "rule of law" (law in the sense of party by-laws). The main problem under Mao could be argued was democratic centralism and how it was interpreted. Democratic centralism was defined as "centralism on the basis of democracy and democracy under centralized guidance". In an environment where formal definitions, institutional design and procedures were relegated to a lesser importance, and those of personal responsibility and ethics were emphasized, men dominated institutions. Ting Gong argues that democratic centralism under Mao "was used to justify the extraordinary authority of its leading officials over ordinary members without subjecting the former to any institutionalized supervision." These problems, the strength of individual politicians and the weaknesses of internal party institutions, may have led to the Cultural Revolution and what the CCP considers as extreme leftism of the 1960s and 1970s.

The modern idea of inner-party supervision came with the reestablishment of the CCDI in 1978. Deng was in the forefront already in 1980 to institutionalise the discipline inspection system;"it is most important to get supervision and inspection institutionalized within the Party". Despite this, the work on this never took off during Deng's own tenure. While several party documents were published on the issue, such as the "Provisional Stipulations of Enhancing the Intra-Party Discipline Inspection by the Central Discipline Inspection Commission" in 1987, "Opinion on Establishing a System of Democratic Assessment of Party Members by the Organizational Department of the CCP" in 1988 and "Several Stipulations on the System of Democratic Life Meetings for the Leading Party Officials at or above the County Level by the CCP Central Committee" in 1990, actual publication of regulation were few and far between. Efforts on institutionalizing the system blew of steam early on, and did not regain steam until the 1990s. This is partly to blame on the Tiananmen Square protests of 1989. Seeing how the party public image was in decline due to its poor anti-corruption efforts the CCP responded by attacking "official speculation", the dominant form of corruption at the time. The 6th Plenary Session of the 13th Central Committee (held in 1990) established a taskforce on drafting what would become the "Internal Supervision Regulation". The first draft was published in 1991, but work on it was abandoned. The idea resurfaced in "The CCP Central Committee's Decision on Several Important Issues Concerning the Party's Construction" in 1994, and a taskforce responsible for drafting the document was established. The new taskforce was empowered full investigative and consultative powers, and worked until 2000 when the second draft was issued. Work stopped yet again from 2000 until the 16th National Congress (held in 2002). The 16th Central Committee established a third taskforce, which published three drafts in April 2003. A period of consultation ensued, in which the taskforce sent the draft to leading cadres, provincial committees and lower-level committees. Several revisions were made, and in December 2003 the 16th Politburo, on behalf of the 16th Central Committee, approved the draft and issued it under the name "Internal Supervision Regulation". It was promulgated in 2004.

== See also ==
- Cadre system of the Chinese Communist Party
