= Ding Xingnong =

- 丁兴农

Director of the Political Work Department of the People's Liberation Army Strategic Support Force
- Incumbent
- Assumed office December 2021

Personal details
- Born: February 1963 (age 63) Jianhu County, Jiangsu, China
- Party: Chinese Communist Party

Military service
- Allegiance: People's Republic of China
- Branch/service: People's Liberation Army Ground Force
- Rank: Lieutenant general

Chinese name
- Simplified Chinese: 丁兴农
- Traditional Chinese: 丁興農
Transcriptions
Standard Mandarin
- Hanyu Pinyin: Dīng Xīngnóng

Ding Xingnong (Chinese: 丁兴农; born February 1963) is a lieutenant general in the People's Liberation Army of China.

He was a member of the 19th Central Commission for Discipline Inspection. He is a representative of the 20th National Congress of the Chinese Communist Party and an alternate of the 20th Central Committee of the Chinese Communist Party.

== Biography ==
Ding was born in Jianhu County, Jiangsu, in February 1963.

He served as deputy director of the Cadre Division of the Political Department of the People's Liberation Army General Armaments Department and then political commissar of the Engineering Design and Research Institute before being appointed party secretary and political commissar of the China Satellite Maritime TT&C Department in 2008. In March 2012, he rose to become director of the Political Department of the People's Liberation Army General Armaments Department.

In December 2021, he was chosen as director of the Political Work Department of the People's Liberation Army Strategic Support Force.

He was promoted to the rank of major general (shaojiang) in July 2010 and lieutenant general (zhongjiang) in 2019.
