= Lan Jun =

Chinese politician

- 蓝军

Communist Party Secretary of Songyuan
- In office March 2006 – May 2011
- Preceded by: Yang Shaoming
- Succeeded by: Wang Changsong

Mayor of Songyuan
- In office April 2003 – March 2006
- Preceded by: Gao Guangbin
- Succeeded by: Sun Hongzhi

Personal details
- Born: October 1953 (age 72–73) Lishu County, Jilin, China
- Party: Chinese Communist Party (1973–2015; expelled)
- Education: Jilin University

Chinese name
- Traditional Chinese: 藍軍
- Simplified Chinese: 蓝军
Transcriptions
Standard Mandarin
- Hanyu Pinyin: Lán Jūn

Lan Jun (Chinese: 蓝军; born 1953) is a former Chinese politician who spent most of his career in northeast China's Jilin province. As of December 2014 he was under investigation by the Communist Party's anti-corruption agency. Previously he served as a member of the Standing Committee of the 12th Jilin Provincial People's Congress and a member of Agriculture and Rural Affairs Committee.

== Life and career ==
Lan Jun was born and raised in Lishu County, Jilin. He graduated from Jilin University.

He began his political career in February 1970, and joined the Chinese Communist Party in December 1973.

During his early years, he successively served as Deputy Head of Propaganda Department of Jilin Provincial Party Committee, Secretary of Jilin Municipal Party Committee of Communist Youth League, and Communist Party Secretary of Longtan District, Jilin City.

In August 1989, he became the Director of Jilin Television and Vice Chief Editor of Jilin Radio and TV Bureau.

In June 1992, he served as Vice Chief of the Press and Publication Bureau of Jilin, and one and a half year later promoted to the Chief position.

In April 2003, he was transferred to Songyuan, he served as Mayor and Deputy Communist Party Secretary from 2003 to 2006, and Communist Party Secretary, the top political position in the city, from 2006 to 2011.

In May 2011, he was transferred to Changchun, capital of Jilin province, and appointed the Deputy Secretary-general of Jilin government, Executive Deputy Director of Jilin Provincial Food Safety Committee, and Director of the Office of Food Safety Commission, he remained in that positions until November 2013, when he served as a member of the Standing Committee of the 12th Jilin Provincial People's Congress and a member of Agriculture and Rural Affairs Committee.

== Downfall ==
On December 8, 2014, the state media reported that he was being investigated by the Central Commission for Discipline Inspection of the Chinese Communist Party for "serious violations of laws and regulations". His successor, Sun Hongzhi, was being investigated on December 26 and was sentenced to 18 years in prison in February 2017.

On May 25, 2015, he was expelled from the Chinese Communist Party (CCP) and removed from public office. On September 8, he was indicted on suspicion of accepting bribes and corruption.

Government offices
Preceded by Gao Guangbin	Mayor of Songyuan; 2003–2006	Succeeded by Sun Hongzhi
Party political offices
Preceded by Yang Shaoming	Communist Party Secretary of Songyuan; 2006–2011	Succeeded by Wang Changsong
