= Wang Huimin (politician, born 1965) =

Chinese politician

- 王慧敏

Chief Editor of Guangming Daily
- Incumbent
- Assumed office May 2021
- Preceded by: Zhang Zheng

Personal details
- Born: December 1965 (age 60) Luoyang, Henan, China
- Party: Chinese Communist Party
- Education: Lanzhou University; Wuhan University

Wang Huimin (Chinese: 王慧敏; pinyin: Wáng Huìmǐn; born December 1965) is a Chinese politician, currently serving as president and chief editor of Guangming Daily.

He is a member of the 20th Central Commission for Discipline Inspection of the Chinese Communist Party. He was a representative of the 20th National Congress of the Chinese Communist Party.

== Early life and education ==
Wang was born in Luoyang, Henan, in December 1965. In 1984, he enrolled at Lanzhou University, where he majored in journalism. From September 1991 to August 1994, he was a master's student in journalism at the Department of Journalism, Wuhan University.

== Career ==
After university in 1988, Wang was despatched to Changzhou Daily as an official in east China's Jiangsu province. He joined the Chinese Communist Party (CCP) in June 1994.

After graduating from Wuhan University in 1994, he was assigned to People's Daily. There, he was in turn a director-level journalist and then a deputy leader of the Rural Group of the Department of Economic Affairs, a director-level journalist, deputy leader, and leader of Xinjiang Journalist Station, leader of Zhejiang Journalist Station, president of Zhejiang Branch, director of the Department of Economic and Social Affairs, and finally chief editor of the Overseas Edition Editorial Department.

He was editor in chief of Guangming Daily in May 2021, in addition to serving as president.

== Publications ==
- 各奔前程 [Each Pursues His Onward Journey] (in Chinese). Beijing: Nationalities Publishing House. 1999. ISBN 9787105035045.
- 影响中国历史100名人 [100 Influential Figures in Chinese History] (in Chinese). Beijing: Nationalities Publishing House. 1999. ISBN 9787105035052.
- 雍正自白 [Yongzheng Emperor's Confession] (in Chinese). Beijing: Nationalities Publishing House. 1999. ISBN 9787105034451.

Party political offices
Preceded by Xu Zhengzhong	Chief Editor of the Overseas Edition Editorial Department of People's Daily; 2019–2021	Succeeded by Chen Zhi
Preceded by Zhang Zheng	Editor in Chief of Guangming Daily; 2021–present	Incumbent
