= Wu Yuliang =

Chinese politician

Wu Yuliang (Chinese: 吴玉良; born 1 April 1952) is a Chinese politician, serving since 2011 as Deputy Secretary of the Central Commission for Discipline Inspection (CCDI), the leading anti-graft body of the Chinese Communist Party.

Born in Xincheng County (now Gaobeidian), Hebei province, Wu has a graduate degree from the Central Party School. In September 1975, he joined the Communist Party. In his early days, he was a soldier working for the Inner Mongolia Production and Construction Corps. He graduated from the Baotou Normal College. He began his career at the CCDI in 1981, and worked in the discipline enforcement system for the remainder of his political career. He worked variously for the publisher under the Ministry of Supervision, the head of the research office of the CCDI, and deputy secretary-general of the CCDI. In January 2004, he was named a member of the Standing Committee of the Central Commission for Discipline Inspection. In December 2007, he was named lead spokesperson and secretary-general of the agency, emerging as the 'face' of the organization. Beginning January 11, 2011, Wu has served as a Deputy Secretary of the Central Commission for Discipline Inspection.

He has been a member of the 16th, 17th, and 18th Central Commissions for Discipline Inspection.

Party political offices
Preceded by Zhang Yi	Secretary General of the Central Commission for Discipline Inspection; 2007–2012	Succeeded by Cui Shaopeng
