= Zhang Zheng (politician) =

Chinese television presenter and politician

- 张政

Vice Minister of Culture and Tourism
- In office February 2024 – March 2025
- Premier: Li Qiang
- Minister: Sun Yeli

Personal details
- Born: April 1966 (age 60) Daqing, Heilongjiang, China
- Party: Chinese Communist Party
- Education: Communication University of China; Renmin University of China

Chinese name
- Simplified Chinese: 张政
- Traditional Chinese: 張政
Transcriptions
Standard Mandarin
- Hanyu Pinyin: Zhāng Zhèng

Zhang Zheng (Chinese: 张政; born April 1966) is a Chinese announcer and politician. Serving as vice minister of culture and tourism, from February 2024 to March 2025.

He was a member of the 11th and 13th National Committee of the Chinese People's Political Consultative Conference. He was a representative of the 19th National Congress of the Chinese Communist Party and is an alternate of the 20th Central Committee of the Chinese Communist Party.

== Early life and education ==
Zhang was born in Daqing, Heilongjiang, in April 1966. In 1985, he enrolled at the Broadcasting Department of Beijing Broadcasting University (now Communication University of China), and joined the Chinese Communist Party (CCP) during his sophomore year. He received his master's degree in economic management from the Renmin University of China in 2001 before gaining his doctor's degree in radio and television art from Beijing Broadcasting University in 2004.

== Career ==
=== Beijing ===
After graduating in 1989, he was dispatched to the China Central Television (CCTV), where he served as an announcer of Xinwen Lianbo, Zhengda Variety Show, Friends and other programs, and also hosted numerous large-scale cultural and artistic events such as the CMG New Year's Gala.

In November 2003, he resigned from the CCTV and served as deputy head of the China Broadcasting Art Troupe.

In March 2006, he became deputy director of the China Performance Management Center, rising to director four months later.

In January 2008, he became a member of the 11th National Committee of the Chinese People's Political Consultative Conference and served in the Committee for Handling Proposals.

=== Xinjiang ===
In August 2008, he was transferred to northwest China's Xinjiang Uygur Autonomous Region and appointed assistant to the chairman. In December of the following year, he was made deputy party secretary of Altay Prefecture, a position at department level.

=== Guizhou ===
In February 2012, he was transferred again to southwest China's Guizhou province and chosen as deputy party secretary of Tongren. In July of the same year, he was assigned to the similar position in Qianxinan Buyei and Miao Autonomous Prefecture, and then party secretary, the top political position in the prefecture, beginning in January 2013.

=== Beijing ===
In June 2017, he became editor in chief of Guangming Daily. In January 2018, he was elected a member of the 13th National Committee of the Chinese People's Political Consultative Conference.

=== Hebei ===
He was appointed head of the Publicity Department of the CCP Hebei Provincial Committee in March 2021 and was admitted to member of the CCP Hebei Provincial Committee, the province's top authority.

=== Central government ===
From February 2024 to March 2025, He severed as vice minister of culture and tourism.

Party political offices
Preceded by Chen Mingming	Communist Party Secretary of Qianxinan Buyei and Miao Autonomous Prefecture; 2013–2017	Succeeded by Liu Wenxin
Preceded by Jiao Yanlong	Head of the Publicity Department of Hebei Provincial Committee of the Chinese Communist Party; 2021–2024	Succeeded by Chang Bin
Government offices
Preceded by Du Feijin	Editor in chief of Guangming Daily; 2017–2021	Succeeded by Wang Huimin
