= Li Xinran =

Chinese politician

- 李欣然

Secretary-General of the Central Commission for Discipline Inspection
- Incumbent
- Assumed office 26 September 2022
- Secretary: Zhao Leji; Li Xi
- Preceded by: Yang Xiaochao

Personal details
- Born: March 1972 (age 54) Kuandian, Dandong, Liaoning, China
- Party: Chinese Communist Party (since 1994)
- Education: China University of Political Science and Law; Peking University

Chinese name
- Simplified Chinese: 李欣然
- Traditional Chinese: 李欣然
Transcriptions
Standard Mandarin
- Hanyu Pinyin: Lǐ Xīnrán

Li Xinran (Chinese: 李欣然; born March 1972) is a Chinese politician serving as the Secretary-General of the Central Commission for Discipline Inspection (CCDI) since 2022. Previously, he served as the Chief Inspector of the CCDI Discipline Inspection Office at the China Banking Regulatory Commission and the Chief Inspector of the CCDI and NSC Discipline Inspection Office at the China Banking and Insurance Regulatory Commission.

== Career ==
Li was born in March 1972 in Kuandian Manchu Autonomous County in Dandong, Liaoning. He is a member of Manchu ethnic group. He studied political science at the China University of Political Science and Law. Later, he studied international relations at the School of International Studies of Peking University. He has a Master of Laws degree.

Li has spent most of his career at the Central Commission for Discipline Inspection (CCDI). He served in various roles at the CCDI's Research Office, Case Inquiries Office and Discipline Inspection Cadre Supervision Office and rose through the ranks. He was dispatched to work at the Lhasa Commission for Discipline Inspection in Lhasa, Tibet, between August 1995 and January 1998. In March 2015, Li was appointed as director of Sixth Supervision and Inspection Office of the CCDI, which oversaw discipline investigations in Beijing, Tianjin, Hebei, and Shanxi. He was put in charge of the investigation of local officials in Shanxi, which was one of the most heavily targeted provinces in the anti-corruption campaign. Li served in this position for only a few months before being appointed as director of the Seventh Supervision and Inspection Office of the CCDI in November 2015. In that role, he was responsible for discipline investigations in Shanghai, Zhejiang, Anhui, Fujian, and Jiangxi.

In September 2017, Li was transferred to the China Banking Regulatory Commission (CBRC) to serve as the chief inspector of the CCDI Discipline Inspection Office of the CBRC, a vice-ministerial position. On October 24, 2017, Li was elected as a member of the 19th CCDI. Following the merger of the CBRC and the China Insurance Regulatory Commission (CIRC) as a part of the 2018 institutional reforms, Li continued in his role and became the chief inspector of the CCDI and the National Supervisory Commission (NSC) Discipline Inspection and Supervision Office of the newly established China Banking and Insurance Regulatory Commission (CBIRC). During his tenure at the CBRC and the CBIRC, Li was involved in the anti-corruption campaign in the financial sector.

On September 26, 2022, Li was appointed the Secretary-General of the CCDI, succeeding Yang Xiaochao. He was subsequently reelected as a member of the 20th CCDI, elected as a member of the Standing Committee of the 20th CCDI, and appointed as a member of the NSC in October 2022. Li concurrently serves as the Director-General of the General Office of the CCDI and the NSC and holds the rank of a Level-II Deputy General Supervisor. In his capacity as the Secretary-General of the CCDI, Li is the chief of staff of Secretary of the CCDI and member of the Politburo Standing Committee Li Xi.

Party political offices
| Preceded by Yang Xiaochao | Secretary-General of the Central Commission for Discipline Inspection; 2022–present | Incumbent |
| Preceded by Zhang Chunsheng | Director-General of the General Office of the Central Commission for Discipline Inspection (One post, 2 names); 2022–present | Incumbent |
| Preceded by Himself; As the Chief Inspector of the CCDI Discipline Inspection Office at the China Banking Regulatory Commission | Chief Inspector of the CCDI Discipline Inspection Office at the China Banking and Insurance Regulatory Commission (One post, 2 names); 2018–2022 | Succeeded by Wang Lujin |
| Preceded by Lin Guoyao; As the Chief Inspector of the CCDI Discipline Inspection Office at the China Insurance Regulatory Commission | Chief Inspector of the CCDI Discipline Inspection Office at the China Banking and Insurance Regulatory Commission (One post, 2 names); 2018–2022 | Succeeded by Wang Lujin |
| Preceded by Du Jinfu | Chief Inspector of the CCDI Discipline Inspection Office at the China Banking Regulatory Commission; 2017–2018 | Succeeded by Himself; As the Chief Inspector of the CCDI and NSC Discipline Inspection Office at the China Banking and Insurance Regulatory Commission |
| Preceded by Huang Wensheng | Director of the Seventh Supervision and Inspection Office of the Central Commission for Discipline Inspection; 2015–2017 | Office abolished |
| Preceded by Geng Xinqiu | Director of the Sixth Supervision and Inspection Office of the Central Commission for Discipline Inspection; 2015 | Succeeded by Mu Hongyu |
Government offices
| Preceded by Zhang Chunsheng | Director-General of the General Office of the National Supervisory Commission (One post, 2 names); 2022–present | Incumbent |
| Preceded by Office created | Chief Inspector of the NSC Discipline Inspection Office at the China Banking and Insurance Regulatory Commission (One post, 2 names); 2018–2022 | Succeeded by Wang Lujin |
