= Regulations on Disciplinary Action of the Chinese Communist Party =

Internal party regulation

The Regulations on Disciplinary Action of the Chinese Communist Party (Chinese: 中国共产党纪律处分条例) is an internal regulation of the Chinese Communist Party (CCP) on party discipline.

== History ==
On 27 February 1997, the Central Committee of the Chinese Communist Party issued the Regulations on Disciplinary Punishment of the Chinese Communist Party (Trial Implementation). On 18 February 2004, the Regulations on Disciplinary Punishment of the Chinese Communist Party were promulgated. It was revised three times on 18 October 2015, 27 August 2018, and 8 December 2023.

== Content ==
The Regulations mention that there are five types of disciplinary sanctions in the Chinese Communist Party, namely, warning within the party, serious warning, removal from party posts, probation within the party, and expulsion from the party.

Party members given probationary punishment, have their positions within and outside the party revoked. A party member who receives probationary punishment will have his or her party membership rights restored or be expelled depending on performance. Within two years after the restoration of party membership rights, the party member shall not hold a position within or outside the party that is equivalent to or higher than their original position.

== See also ==
- Cadre system of the Chinese Communist Party
