= Wang Changsong =

Chinese politician

- 王常松

Chairman of the Tianjin Municipal Committee of the Chinese People's Political Consultative Conference
- Incumbent
- Assumed office January 2023
- Preceded by: Sheng Maolin

Personal details
- Born: July 1962 (age 64) Wuwei County, Anhui, China
- Party: Chinese Communist Party
- Education: Anhui University; Peking University

Wang Changsong (Chinese: 王常松; pinyin: Wáng Chángsōng; born July 1962) is a Chinese politician, currently serving as chairman of the Tianjin Municipal Committee of the Chinese People's Political Consultative Conference.

Wang was a representative of the 18th, 19th, and is a representative of the 20th National Congress of the Chinese Communist Party. He was a member of the 19th Central Commission for Discipline Inspection and is a member of the 20th Central Commission for Discipline Inspection. He was a member of the 12th, 13th and 14th National Committee of the Chinese People's Political Consultative Conference. He was a delegate to the 12th and 13th National People's Congress.

== Early life and education ==
Wang was born in Wuwei County, Anhui (now Wuwei), in July 1962. After resuming the college entrance examination, in 1979, he was accepted to Anhui University, where he majored in law. After graduation in 1983, he did his postgraduate work at Peking University. He joined the Chinese Communist Party (CCP) in September 1985.

== Career ==
After university in 1986, Wang was despatched to the Laws and Regulations Department of the National Audit Office and over a period of 22 years worked his way up to the position of director.

Wang was transferred to northeast China's Jilin province in November 2010. He was deputy party secretary of Songyuan, in addition to serving as mayor since January 2011. He rose to party secretary, the top political position in the city, in May 2011. In January 2013, he was chosen as president of Jilin Provincial High People's Court, although he remained party secretary of Songyuan until March 2013.

Wang was admitted to standing committee member of the CCP Heilongjiang Provincial Committee, the province's top authority, in June 2016, and appointed secretary of the Provincial Commission for Discipline Inspection. He also served as director of the Heilongjiang Supervision Commission since January 2018.

Wang was assigned to the similar position in east China's Jiangsu province in March 2020.

In January 2023, Wang took office as chairman of the Tianjin Municipal Committee of the Chinese People's Political Consultative Conference, the provincial advisory body.

Government offices
Preceded by Sun Hongzhi	Mayor of Songyuan; 2011	Succeeded by Li Xiangguo
Party political offices
Preceded by Lan Jun	Communist Party Secretary of Songyuan; 2011–2013	Succeeded by Gao Fuping
Preceded by Huang Jiansheng	Secretary of the Discipline Inspection Committee of Heilongjiang Provincial Committee of the Chinese Communist Party; 2016–2020	Succeeded by Zhang Wei
Preceded by Jiang Zhuoqing	Secretary of the Discipline Inspection Committee of Jiangsu Provincial Committee of the Chinese Communist Party; 2020–2023	Succeeded by Zhang Zhong
New title	Director of the Heilongjiang Supervision Commission; 2018–2020	Succeeded by Zhang Wei
Preceded by Jiang Zhuoqing	Director of the Jiangsu Supervision Commission; 2020–2023	Succeeded by Zhang Zhong
Legal offices
Preceded by Zhang Wenxian	President of Jilin Provincial High People's Court; 2013–2016	Succeeded by Kou Fang
Assembly seats
Preceded by Sheng Maolin	Chairman of the Tianjin Municipal Committee of the Chinese People's Political Consultative Conference; 2023–present	Incumbent
