= Tan Jian (diplomat) =

Chinese diplomat

- 谈践

Chinese Ambassador to the Netherlands
- In office 5 January 2021 – December 2025
- Preceded by: Xu Hong
- Succeeded by: Shen Bo

Chinese Ambassador to Ethiopia
- In office December 2017 – September 2020
- Preceded by: La Yifan
- Succeeded by: Zhao Zhiyuan

Personal details
- Born: March 1965 (age 61) China
- Party: Chinese Communist Party
- Education: Nanjing Foreign Language School
- Occupation: Diplomat

Chinese name
- Traditional Chinese: 談踐
- Simplified Chinese: 谈践
Transcriptions
Standard Mandarin
- Hanyu Pinyin: Tán Jiàn

Tan Jian (Chinese: 谈践; born March 1965) is a Chinese diplomat. Previously he served as Chinese Ambassador to Ethiopia and Chinese ambassador to the Netherlands.

== Biography ==
Tan was born in March 1965. He attended the Nanjing Foreign Language School. He joined the Foreign Service in 1987 and has served in various diplomatic positions including attaché, secretary, and counsellor. In 2012 he was promoted to become counsellor and deputy director of the Department of International Economic Affairs, a position he held until 2017. On December 14, 2017, the Standing Committee of the National People's Congress appointed him Chinese Ambassador to Ethiopia, a post in which he served from December 2017 to September 2020. On January 5, 2021, he was appointed Chinese ambassador to the Netherlands, replacing Xu Hong. In January 2026, pursuant to a decision of the Standing Committee of the National People's Congress, President Xi Jinping removed Tan Jian from the post and appointed Shen Bo as Ambassador Extraordinary and Plenipotentiary of the People's Republic of China to the Kingdom of the Netherlands.

Diplomatic posts
Preceded by La Yifan	Chinese Ambassador to Ethiopia; 2017–2020	Succeeded by Zhao Zhiyuan
Preceded by Xu Hong	Chinese Ambassador to the Netherlands; 2020–2025	Succeeded by Shen Bo
