= Internal organization of the Central Commission for Discipline Inspection =

Currently 31 bureaus and offices make up the internal organization of the Central Commission for Discipline Inspection of the Chinese Communist Party.

== Internal organization ==
- General Office (办公厅)
- Organization Department (组织部)
- Propaganda Department (宣传部)
- Research Office (研究室)
- Legislative Office (法规室)
- Office for Improve Party Conduct and Style (党风政风监督室)
- Complaints Office (信访室)
- Office of Central Leading Group for Inspection Work (中央巡视工作领导小组办公室)
- Laws and Regulations Office (案件监督管理室)
- No. 1 to No. 16 Offices for Discipline Inspection and Supervision (纪检监察室, 16 divisions)
- Case Hearing Office (案件审理室)
- Supervision Integrated Office (纪检监察干部监督室)
- International Cooperation Agency (国际合作局)
- Office for Government Administration (机关事务管理局)
- Administrative Office of Party Organs (机关党委)
- Bureau of Retired Cadres (离退休干部局)

=== Dispatched organizations ===
- State Organs Discipline Inspection and Supervision Working Committee (中央纪律检查委员会国家监察委员会中央和国家机关纪检监察工作委员会)
- Central Financial Discipline Inspection and Supervision Working Committee (中央纪律检查委员会国家监察委员会中央金融纪检监察工作委员会)

=== Before 2018 reorganization ===
- General Office (办公厅)
- Propaganda Department (宣传部)
- Organization Department (组织部)
- Research Office (研究室)
- Legislative Office (法规室)
- Office for Improve Party Conduct and Style (党风政风监督室)
- Complaints Office (信访室)
- Office of Central Leading Group for Inspection Work (中央巡视工作领导小组办公室)
- Laws and Regulations Office (案件监督管理室)
- No. 1 to No. 12 Offices for Discipline Inspection and Supervision (纪检监察室, 12 divisions)
- Case Hearing Office (案件审理室)
- Supervision Integrated Office (纪检监察干部监督室)
- International Cooperation Agency (国际合作局)
- Office for Government Administration (机关事务管理局)
- Administrative Office of Party Organs (机关党委)
- Bureau of Retired Cadres (离退休干部局)

=== Before 2014 reorganization ===
- No. 1 to No. 12 Offices for Discipline Inspection and Supervision
- Office for Circuit Inspection Work
- Research Office
- Case Hearing Office
- Complaints Office
- Supervision Office for Enforcement and Performance
- Office for Propaganda and Education
- Administrative Bureau of Case Supervision
- Laws and Regulations Office
- Supervision Integrated Office
- Office for the Prevention of Corruption
- Foreign Affairs' Bureau
- Administrative Office of Party Committee
- Bureau of Departmental Affairs Management
- Bureau of Retired Cadres
- Cadre Office
- Theories of Clean Government Research Centre
- Information Centre
