= Institutions directly under the Central Commission for Discipline Inspection =

There are currently eleven institutions directly under the Central Commission for Discipline Inspection of the Chinese Communist Party. Of the twelve institutions, two are journals.

== Institutions ==
Institution	Established
Chinese Supervision Magazine 中国监察杂志社	
Chinese Discipline Inspection and Supervision Daily 中国纪检监察报社	1 October 1994
Network Centre 网络中心	
Network Technology Centre 网络技术中心	
Government Service Centre 机关综合服务中心	
Information Centre (Internet Reporting Management Centre) 信息中心（网络举报管理中心）	
China Discipline Inspection and Supervision Institute 中国纪检监察学院	11 October 2010
Beidaihe Training Centre 北戴河培训中心	1986
News and Communication Centre 新闻传播中心	
China Fangzheng Publishers 中国方正出版社	

=== Before reorganization in 2018 ===
Institution	Established
Chinese Supervision Magazine 中国监察杂志社	
Chinese Discipline Inspection and Supervision Daily 中国纪检监察报社	1 October 1994
China Fangzheng Publishers 中国方正出版社	
Centre of Audio-Visual Education 电化教育中心	
Departmental Comprehensive Service Centre 机关综合服务中心	
Information Centre 信息中心	
China Discipline Inspection and Supervision Institute 中国纪检监察学院	11 October 2010
Beidaihe Training Centre 北戴河培训中心	1986
Independent Center for Theoretical Study 廉政理论研究中心	

=== Before reorganization in 2014 ===
Institution	Established
Chinese Supervision 中国纪检监察	
Chinese Discipline Inspection and Supervision Daily 中国纪检监察报社	1 October 1994
Journal of Global People	
Beijing Daxing Training Centre	
Beidaihe Training Centre 北戴河培训中心	1986
Hangzhou Training Centre 杭州培训中心	April 1990
Centre of Audio-Visual Education 电化教育中心	
China Fangzheng Publishers 中国方正出版社	
China Discipline Inspection and Supervision Institute 中国纪检监察学院	11 October 2010
Poverty Relief Office	
Departmental Comprehensive Service Centre 中央纪委监察部机关综合服务中心	
Research Centre for Administrative Supervision	
