= Liuzhi (detention) =

Chinese Communist Party disciplinary system

- Simplified Chinese: 留置
Transcriptions
Standard Mandarin
- Hanyu Pinyin: Liúzhì

Liuzhi or "retention in custody" is a disciplinary process in the People's Republic of China to detain individuals for up to eights months per suspected offense during an investigation. Its legal basis is the Supervision Law of the People's Republic of China, which does not allow the accused access to lawyers during detention.

Liuzhi replaced the shuanggui implemented by the discipline inspection organs of the Chinese Communist Party (CCP) and the liangzhi implemented by the administrative supervision departments of the people's governments, and returned the previous party power to the state law enforcement, saving judicial resources. Liuzhi expands beyond CCP members to the entire public sector, academics, and business leaders. People are typically held in cells without windows and with lights always on under 24-hour supervision. Physical and psychological torture is common. Liuzhi is increasingly used by indebted municipal governments to shake down wealthy individuals in what has been colloquially termed "deep sea fishing."

== History ==
On December 25, 2016, the 25th meeting of the Standing Committee of the 12th National People's Congress adopted the "Decision of the Standing Committee of the National People's Congress on Carrying out Pilot Work on the Reform of the National Supervisory System in Beijing, Shanxi and Zhejiang Provinces". In accordance with the determined by the CCP Central Committee, in order to explore and accumulate experience in promoting the reform of the national supervisory system across the country, it was decided to carry out pilot work on the reform of the national supervisory system in Beijing, Shanxi and Zhejiang Provinces. The decision states that "in order to perform the above powers, the Supervisory Commission may adopt measures such as interviewing, interrogating, questioning, inquiring, freezing, retrieving, sealing, seizing, searching, inspecting, examining, appraising and detaining." The first 11 measures belong to the measures taken by the Supervisory Department (Bureau), the Anti-Corruption Bureau, and the People's Procuratorate's departments for investigating and handling corruption, dereliction of duty, and preventing duty-related crimes before the transfer. The legal basis for measures such as interviewing, interrogating and questioning was previously clear. Only the measure of "detention" belongs to the new power.

On March 17, 2017, the first supervisory detention measure was implemented by the Hangzhou Shangcheng District Supervisory Committee. The person involved, Yu, was not a member of the Chinese Communist Party and was suspected of corruption. On October 18, 2017, CCP General Secretary Xi Jinping proposed in his report at the party's 19th National Congress that "a national supervision law should be formulated to grant the supervision committee responsibilities, powers and investigative methods in accordance with the law, and to replace the 'two regulations' measures with detention."

On April 1, 2018, the official website of the Central Commission for Discipline Inspection and the National Supervisory Commission announced that Wang Xiaoguang, former member of the Standing Committee of the Guizhou Provincial Party Committee and vice governor, was suspected of serious violations of discipline and law and was under disciplinary review and supervisory investigation. This means that Wang Xiaoguang became the first provincial and ministerial official to be subject to supervisory detention measures since the establishment of the Supervisory Commission.

In 2025, changes to regulations permit authorities to hold people for up to eight months per suspected offense.

== Purpose ==
The role of liuzhi is to replace shuanggui and liangzhi. After the establishment of supervisory committees at all levels, not only did they integrate resources, but they also legalized power, making the "two regulations" that were originally outside the law become liuzhi stipulated in the Supervision Law of the People's Republic of China. The shuanggui within the party discipline and the liangzhi within the law were uniformly replaced by liuzhi within the law. Moreover, the supervisory committee does not need to go to the People's Procuratorate after the evidence is obtained, making the connection of judicial resources more economical.

Liuzhi has increasingly been used as a tactic by indebted municipal governments to extort wealthy individuals in order to raise funds in what is colloquially termed "deep sea fishing."
