= Central Commission for Discipline Inspection =

Highest supervisory body of the Chinese Communist Party

Central Commission for Discipline Inspection 中国共产党中央纪律检查委员会
- 20th Central Commission for Discipline Inspection (2022–2027)
- Emblem of the Chinese Communist Party

Overview
- Type: Supervisory organ Deputy national level agency
- Responsible to: National Congress
- Subordinated to: Central Committee
- Elected by: National Congress
- Length of term: Five years
- Term limits: None

History
- Established: by 5th National Congress on 9 May 1927; 99 years ago
- First convocation: 9 May 1927
- Latest convocation: 9–11 January 2023

Leadership
- Political Executive Leader: Secretary
- Secretary: Li Xi
- Deputy Secretary: Liu Jinguo; Zhang Shengmin; Xiao Pei; Yu Hongqiu; Fu Kui; Sun Xinyang; Liu Xuexin; Zhang Fuhai
- Secretary-General: Li Xinran
- Standing Committee: 19 members (20th)

Members
- Total: 133 members
- Newcomers: 88 members (20th)
- Old: 45 members (19th)

Elections
- Last election: The 20th National Congress on 22 October 2022
- Next election: The 21st National Congress in 2027

Meeting place
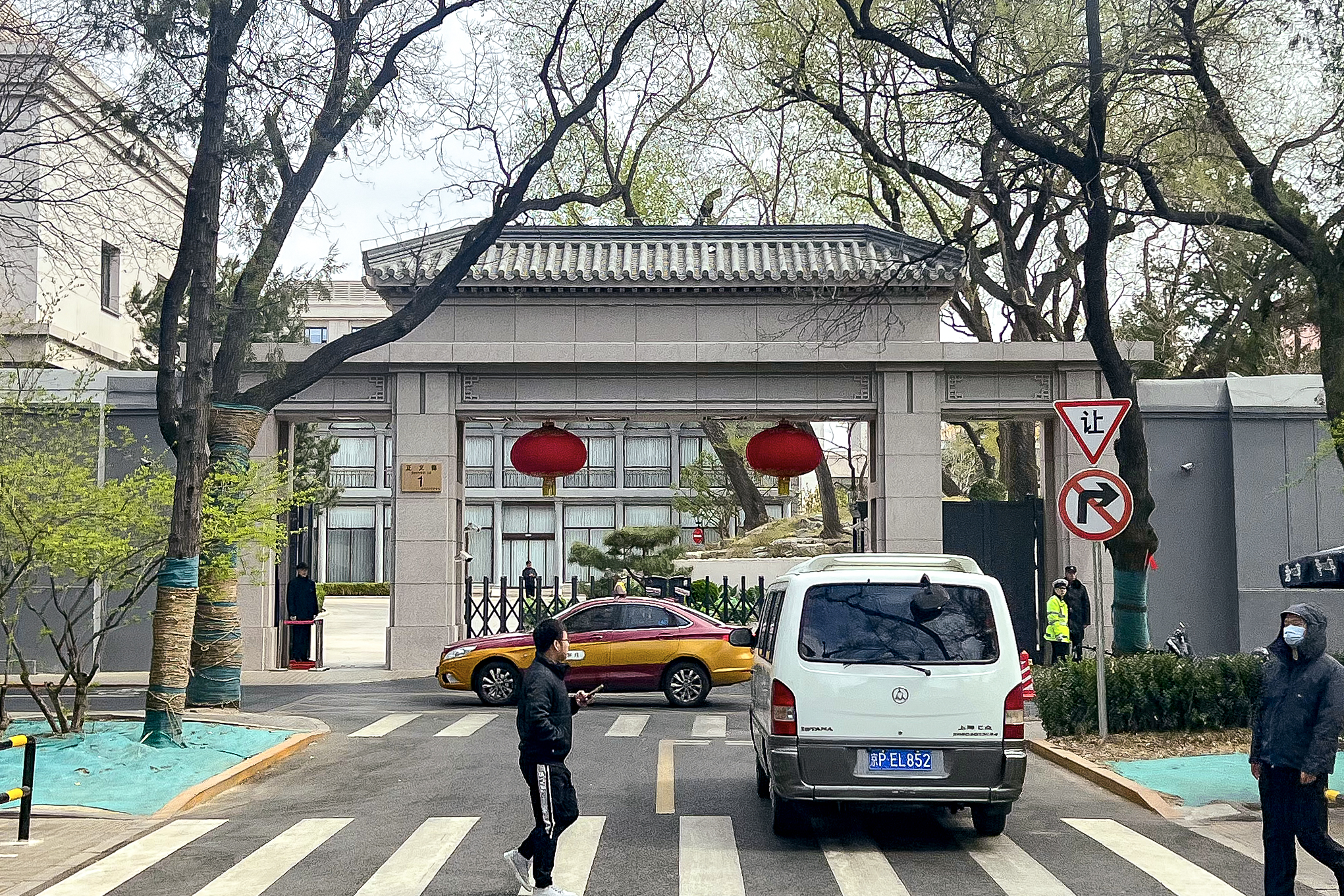
- CCDI Headquarters; 1 Zhengyi Road, Dongcheng District, Beijing

Constitution
- "Constitution of the Chinese Communist Party"

Rules
- "Regulation on the Work of the Discipline Inspection Commission of the Communist Party of China"

Website
- www.ccdi.gov.cn

Central Commission for Discipline Inspection
- Traditional Chinese: 中國共產黨中央紀律檢查委員會
- Simplified Chinese: 中国共产党中央纪律检查委员会
- Literal meaning: Central Discipline Inspection Commission of the Communist Party of China
Transcriptions
Standard Mandarin
- Hanyu Pinyin: Zhōngguó Gòngchǎndǎng Zhōngyāng Jìlǜ Jiǎnchá Wěiyuánhuì

Commonly abbreviated as
- Traditional Chinese: 中央紀委
- Simplified Chinese: 中央纪委
- Literal meaning: Central Discipline Commission
Transcriptions
Standard Mandarin
- Hanyu Pinyin: Zhōngyāng Jìwěi

Further abbreviated as
- Traditional Chinese: 中紀委
- Simplified Chinese: 中纪委
- Literal meaning: Central Discipline Commission
Transcriptions
Standard Mandarin
- Hanyu Pinyin: Zhōngjìwěi

The Central Commission for Discipline Inspection (CCDI) (Note: In English, the name of the body is sometimes translated as "Central Discipline Inspection Commission" (CDIC).) is the supreme supervisory organ of the Chinese Communist Party (CCP). The CCDI is elected and supervised by the CCP National Congress. It is tasked with defending the party constitution, enforcing inner-party regulations, coordinating anti-corruption work, and safeguarding the core position of the CCP general secretary Xi Jinping and the party as a whole. Safeguarding the political position of Xi and the Central Committee is, officially, the CCDI's highest responsibility. Since the vast majority of officials at all levels of government are also CCP members, the commission is, in practice, the top anti-corruption body in the People's Republic of China (PRC).

At its first plenary session after being elected by a CCP National Congress, the CCDI elect its secretary, deputy secretaries, secretary general and other Standing Committee members. The CCDI then reports the election results to the Central Committee, which can either approve or disapprove of the results. The CCDI Standing Committee is responsible for convening and presiding over plenary sessions of the CCDI. When the CCDI is not in session, its powers and responsibilities are delegated to the CCDI Standing Committee, which has to implement the decisions of the CCP Central Committee and the CCDI plenary sessions. It is held accountable to the CCDI plenary sessions. The secretary convenes, presides over the work and sets the agenda of the CCDI Standing Committee meetings. The current secretary is Li Xi, who was elected by the 1st Plenary Session of the 20th Central Commission for Discipline Inspection and approved by the 20th Central Committee on 23 October 2022.

The modern commission was established at the 3rd Plenary Session of the 11th Central Committee in December 1978. Control systems had existed previously under the name "Central Control Commission" for a brief period in 1927 and again between 1955 and 1968, and under its present name from 1949 to 1955. It was disbanded during the Cultural Revolution in 1969. In 1993, the internal operations of the agency and the government's Ministry of Supervision (MOS) were merged. However, beginning with Hu Jintao's term as General Secretary of the Chinese Communist Party in November 2002, and especially following Xi Jinping's assumption of the party leadership in November 2012, the CCDI has undergone significant reforms to increase its autonomy. Since 2018, the National Supervisory Commission has acted as the state arm of the CCDI.

== History ==
=== Before the People's Republic ===
The idea of a control system was inspired by Vladimir Lenin in The State and Revolution. Lenin argued that every communist vanguard party, at all levels, needed a system to supervise party-official elections, dismissals, and performance. His writings led to the establishment of the Soviet Central Control Commission. The control system and the party structure were imported by China. The importance of discipline and supervision was emphasized since the CCP's founding. The 2nd National Congress amended the party constitution, devoting a chapter to party discipline. However, no institution was established to safeguard party norms or supervise cadre behavior. Until the establishment of the Central Control Commission (CCC) at the 5th National Congress in 1927, local party committees were responsible for supervising members.

The 5th National Congress again amended the party constitution, adding a chapter on control commissions and their aims, but devoting little attention to their operations. Partly because of this, the control commissions actively participated in several party rectification campaigns during the late 1920s and early 1930s. At that time, the commissions tended to participate in political struggles, most notably the purges of Zhang Guotao and Wang Ming.

The control system was reorganized as the Central Review Committee (1928–1933), the Central Party Affairs Committee (1933–1945), and the Central Control Commission (1945–1949). Despite these changes, the duties and responsibilities of the control bodies remained vague until the amendments to the party constitution at the 7th National Congress in 1945. Although it may be argued that the 1945 amendments did little to clarify the role of a control body, the party leadership expanded on the theoretical reasons for its existence. It was argued in the party constitution that the control system "was born to serve the needs of a Leninist party for its ideological and organizational consolidation. Such a role was reinforced in the Party's frequent campaigns against its real or perceived enemies in and out of the party organization."

In 1949, the Central Committee established the Central Commission for Discipline Inspection (CCDI). It differed from its predecessors in several respects. It was responsible to the Politburo, and its local organizations were responsible for their corresponding party committees, despite the committees' authority to restrict their behavior. In reality, the CCDI was established to check all party organizations except the central leadership.

=== Political history ===
During its early years, the CCDI was not a powerful institution. Although it focused on abuses by party veterans and senior officials, the CCDI rarely appeared on record at that time as investigating (or solving) those problems. The few mentions of CCDI inspectors in the press highlighted their failures. Despite the support of Mao Zedong and the central party leadership, it was often unable to fulfill its mandate in the provinces. According to a People's Daily editorial, party inspectors "gave up the struggle and proved themselves unable to persist in ... upholding the dignity of Party discipline when they encountered great obstacles." Aware of Yan'an Rectification Movement successes and CCDI failures, the party leadership used mass mobilization and ideological campaigns to tackle party corruption during the 1950s. In the wake of the Gao Gang–Rao Shushi affair, the CCDI was replaced by the CCC.

Although the CCC became a powerful political force in the following years, at the 8th National Congress in 1956, its inspectors were warned about abusing their power and becoming independent of their local party committees. Its power waned during the Great Leap Forward, but the CCC, the Secretariat, and the Organization Department became the chief weapons in the aftermath of the Great Leap to combat corruption and reverse verdicts on rightists. The CCC played its new role until the Cultural Revolution, a socio-political movement which lasted from 1966 until 1976, when it was affected by purges (partly due to its close ties to Peng Zhen, one of the first highly ranked officials purged during the Cultural Revolution). At the 9th National Congress in 1969, the CCC was abolished, removed from the party constitution, and replaced by special-case organizations (such as the Central Case Examination Group) formed under Mao and Kang Sheng. Despite its abolition at the congress, little criticism was directed at the CCC during the Cultural Revolution; although CCC Deputy Secretary Min Yifan was criticized by the Red Guards, a revolutionary youth movement independent of the party (but inspired by Mao) during the Cultural Revolution. Most of their disapproval focused on his career on local committees, rather than the CCC. Talk of an internal party-control system would not resurface until the death of Mao and the arrest of the Gang of Four in 1976.

The CCDI was reestablished at the 11th National Congress in 1977. It had three goals: removing the social influence of the Gang of Four, implementing the leadership's cadre policy, and removing "despotic" local party secretaries, and reversing poor verdicts handed down during the Cultural Revolution. Due to the power struggle between Deng Xiaoping and Hua Guofeng, the control system was not implemented in 1977–1978. The 3rd Plenary Session of the 11th Central Committee in December 1978 formed a new control system under its 1949–1955 name, with responsibilities identical to those of the CCC before its abolition. After the 3rd Plenary Session, the CCDI convened its 1st Plenary Session and elected Chen Yun as First Secretary, Deng Yingchao as Second Secretary, Hu Yaobang as Third Secretary, and Huang Kecheng as Permanent Secretary. However, the election of these people (and others) was purely symbolic; the new CCDI consisted generally of people who had never been involved in control affairs, and overwhelmingly of members considered too young to be taken seriously. In its 1st Plenary Session, the CCDI stated three overarching goals: to "protect party members' rights", to enforce and safeguard the system of collective leadership "with the division of labor by the individual", and to generally oppose the over-concentration of power in one individual. It would combat corrupt tendencies in the party and handle individual complaints.

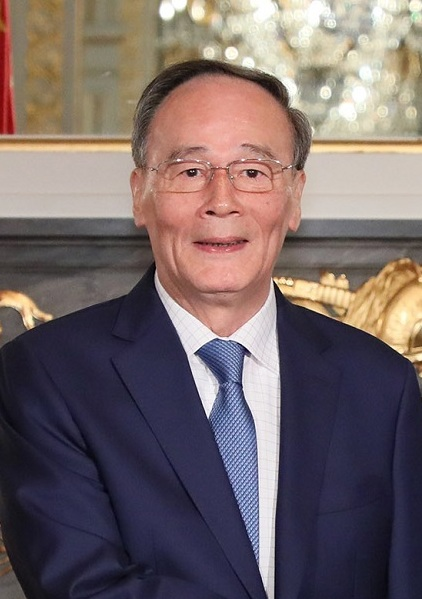
Wang Qishan headed the organization through the office of CCDI Secretary in the period 2012–17

Although the press and the CCDI highlighted its fight against corruption, the commission was powerless against many "local despots": leaders who ruled largely by fiat. During the early 1980s, the 11th Central Committee was forced to enact emergency measures to combat corruption. Instead of fighting corrupt officials, the CCDI's local branches focused on the rank and file. It was an organizational weapon against the "leftists" (who advanced during the Cultural Revolution or supported it) and the "rightists" (supporters of bourgeois democracy). After weakening under Zhao Ziyang, CCDI power increased in the aftermath of the Tiananmen Square protests of 1989 under the tutelage of Deng and Jiang Zemin.

Despite the commission's position as the party's – and China's – leading anti-corruption agency, its leaders have admitted serious deficiencies in its work. CCDI Secretary Wei Jianxing allegedly tendered his resignation "on the eve" of the 5th Plenary Session of the 15th Central Committee in 2000 to protest the commission's impotence. His successor Wu Guanzheng found himself in a similar situation, allegedly tendering his resignation in August 2005. Although neither resigned before the end of his term, they were unable to increase CCDI independence from the committees or end the Central Secretariat's interference in its activities.

In late 2013, Zhou Yongkang, a former member of the Politburo Standing Committee (PSC) and head of China's security agencies, was placed under investigation by the CCDI for abuse of power and corruption, a decision state media announced in July 2014. Zhou was the first PSC member – and the most senior-ranked official – since the founding of the People's Republic of China to be tried and convicted of corruption-related charges. Following his investigation, Zhou was expelled from the CCP. On 11 June 2015, Zhou was convicted of bribery, abuse of power, and the intentional disclosure of state secrets. Zhou and his family members were said to have taken 129 million yuan (over $20 million) in bribes. He was sentenced to life in prison.

According to scholar Xuezhi Guo, "From 1992 to 2009, China brought disciplinary sanctions against approximately two million personnel". The CCDI cited similar numbers: "[B]etween July 2003 and December 2008, the CCDI had tried and closed 852,000 cases, resulting in 881,000 officials receiving disciplinary sanctions." In 2009, the CCDI imposed disciplinary sanctions on 106,626 party members and officials; 146,517 in 2010; 142,893 in 2011; 160,718 in 2012, and 182,000 in 2013. From 2012 to October 2017, disciplinary action started against 1.4 million communist party members. As of 2014, five of the 31 CDI secretaries were women: Huang Xiaowei, Hong Qiang, Zhang Xiaolan, Ma Yongxia, and Song Airong. Of these Zhang, at age 50, was currently the youngest serving CDI provincial secretary.

=== Institutional history ===
==== Founding, abolition, and reestablishment (1949–1980) ====
The Chinese control system was inspired by Soviet control institutions, most notably the Party Control Committee (PCC). Although, according to Lenin, the Soviet PCC was established to cure the party's bureaucratic ills, it evolved into a tool wielded by party secretaries. The CCDI system was not empowered to the same extent as its Soviet counterpart, since Mao favored mass mobilization and ideological campaigns over party disciplinary measures to curb bad behavior. Even those who shared the Soviet fascination with organizational self-correction, like Liu Shaoqi and Dong Biwu, did not share their obsession with "scientific administration". (Note: According to Viktor Afanasyev, a leading official in the Communist Party of the Soviet Union, scientific administration means "The systematically exercised, conscious and purposeful influence by man on the social system as a whole or on its separate aspects ... on the basis of knowledge and use of the objective laws of socialism and its progressive trends, in order to ensure its effective functioning and development.")

The most important question for realising fundamental improvement in Party style is to uphold the Party's political discipline, adhere to the Four Cardinal Principles, work hard to build socialist spiritual civilisation with communist ideology as the core, and guarantee that the whole Party maintains political unanimity with the Central Committee. DICs at all levels must take this as the focus of their work.

— Report of the CCDI to the 12th National Congress in 1982, which endorsed the commission's position as an organisational weapon of the Central Committee.

The CCDI was cumbersome; twenty-seven separate procedures had to be completed before an official could be placed under investigation. Other problems were institutional; for example, the commission had no organization below the provincial level. In response to the CCDI's failures, the 8th National Congress of the Chinese Communist Party established the CCC. Delegates noted that the CCDI's problems were its lack of independence from party committees and the lack of meaningful collaboration between a control commission at one level and those at higher levels. The institutional balance favoring party committees led some (such as Gao Gang and Rao Shushi) to pack local commissions for discipline inspection (CDI) with loyalists who had no interest in carrying out their responsibilities. The control commissions had the power to appeal committee decisions, and were required to report their work to the higher-level control commission. Unlike the CCDI, the CCC had an organization below the provincial level. It was empowered to "examine, approve, and change decisions by lower control committees", was required to verify the composition of control committees at the provincial level and below, and had the power to investigate unreliable elements at will. Bonds were forged with the Ministry of Supervision (MOS) and the Supreme People's Procuratorate to strengthen the anti-corruption agencies' control of "the rapidly expanding party organization and an increasingly elaborate state bureaucracy".

The main goals of these reforms were to strengthen the autonomy of the control commissions from the local ruling committees and safeguard the powers of the center, which were threatened during the Gao Gang–Rao Shushi affair. However, CCP leadership backtracked; at the 8th National Congress, the autonomy of the CCC and the control commissions was reduced. The congress was held in a conservative atmosphere, with the leadership calling for collective leadership of all institutions; the concept of the CCC and the local control commissions having "special rights" to carry out their duties was antithetical to collegial decision-making. The CCC was abolished at the 9th Congress (during the Cultural Revolution), and was reestablished at the 11th National Congress. The 11th National Congress amended the party constitution to state that the "Central Committee of the Party, local Party committees at the county level and above and Party committees in the army units at the regimental level and above should set up commissions for inspecting discipline". The system was in place by December 1978, and a corresponding control system in the military was established in 1981 as the Commission for Discipline Inspection of the Central Military Commission. The CCDI's importance was institutionalized by a party regulation that its head must be a member of the Politburo Standing Committee.

==== "Dual-leadership" system (1980–2002) ====
According to Lawrence Sullivan, during the 1980s some cadres saw the CCDI's lack of independence as problematic; they argued that it should be independent from the Central Committee, not involving itself in the committee's power struggles. This was opposed by the CCDI leadership, with Huang saying that loyalty to the Central Committee was "more important" than fighting corruption. The chief problem during the early 1980s was CCDI links to local party committees. The local committees elected the commission for discipline inspection (CDI) at their level, but the higher-level CDI could endorse – or reject – the proposed committee. This made the local CDI responsible to its party committee, rather than to the CCDI. Although the organizers of the system were aware of the danger, they believed that the CDIs (through their connection with the central leadership) would be able to carry out their assigned task despite their election by the committee they were supposed to inspect. This institutional anomaly secured the position of corrupt (or "despotic") committee members.

There are times when we [i.e., discipline inspection committees] want to file a case for investigation, but leaders consider various aspects of the situation and decide provisionally against investigation.... From one perspective, investigation may make sense, but in the larger scheme of things it may make sense to put the issue aside for a while. Indeed, it may produce even better results. We should have confidence that party committees ... view problems from a more comprehensive perspective than we do. We cannot be overly confident, thinking that whatever case we want to investigate must be investigated, that not to do so reflects a failure to assign high priority [to the anticorruption effort] or suppression of an investigation. We cannot be so simplistic in our inferences. The same goes for decisions on disciplinary actions. In some cases, we think there should be expulsion from the Party, but the party committee discusses it and decides on probation within the Party. They do not follow our recommendation. We cannot then say that this is the party committee not assigning high priority [to the anticorruption effort] or being overly lenient in meting out punishment. We must recognise that, after all, our discipline inspection committees have their own biases.

— Wei Jianxing, CCDI Secretary from 1992 to 2002, insisting that dual leadership meant party-committee supremacy.

Because of this institutional structure, it was nearly impossible for the CCDI to carry out its mandate. On the few occasions when it attempted to investigate leading officials, it often experienced retaliation. These problems were widespread, leading the Third Secretary to say that "considerable and, in some cases, shocking obstructions in the [CCDI's] work [occurred often]." The party leadership tried to solve these problems at the 12th National Congress, in 1982, by expanding CCDI jurisdiction and authority. The amended party constitution stated that the CCDI's responsibility was "to safeguard the Party's Constitution and other important rules and regulations, to assist Party committees in rectifying Party style, to inspect implementation of the Party's line, principles, policies, and resolutions." The commission became the defender of party orthodoxy, party organization, rules and regulations, the Central Committee, and democratic centralism (defined as obeying the Central Committee). The amendment allowed local CDIs to "take their case to the next-higher party committee" if they considered the committee decision at their level faulty. The 12th National Congress introduced dual leadership in local CDIs; they were responsible to the party committees at their (and the higher) level and to the higher-level CDI. Although each CDI elects a Standing Committee, the 12th National Congress retained a regulation that the Standing Committee must obtain the endorsement of its party committee. That was why the CCDI, elected by the National Congress (not the Central Committee, as it was previously), remained subordinate to the Central Committee. If a Central Committee member was suspected, the CCDI would have to inform (and obtain a ruling from) the Central Committee to begin an investigation.

Unlike the 12th National Congress, the 13th National Congress in 1987 reduced the CCDI's power. Reformist general secretary Zhao Ziyang wanted to end CCDI meddling in China's legal system and reduce its scope to party-discipline issues. Forty-nine CCDI discipline-inspection groups in central ministries and party organizations were abolished at the congress (75 percent of all inspection groups), and the CCDI's chief lost his seat on the Politburo Standing Committee. In the aftermath of the 1989 Tiananmen Square protests and massacre, Zhao Ziyang's reforms were rescinded, and the former CCDI inspection groups were reestablished. Commission power was increased, and the CCDI issued the "five forbiddens"; party members could not "(1) operate a business, (2) work in an economic entity, (3) trade in stocks, (4) accept gifts, or (5) use public funds for lavish entertainment." The 14th National Congress, in 1992, strengthened CCDI and local CDI investigative powers. According to the amended party constitution, local CDIs could initiate preliminary investigations against members of the local party committee at the CDI's level before a formal investigation began. If a full investigation was warranted, the local CDI had to obtain approval from its higher-level CDI and the corresponding party committee. In 1995, its powers were increased further, with each CDI given the responsibility to vet officials before their appointment to a post. The shuanggui system (see below) was established in 1994 by order of the CCDI. It was first officially mentioned in Article 28 of the Regulation on Dealing with Cases of Party Discipline Violations, which came into effect on 1 May 1994.

Since the 1990s, the mission of CDI's have been less political and more focused on anticorruption efforts.

==== Institution-building (2002–present) ====
The CCDI was further reformed at the 16th National Congress in 2002. The CCDI Secretary was now the chief coordinator of all anti-corruption efforts on the mainland, a position later known as Leader of the Central Leading Group for Inspection Work. This was further codified in 2004 and 2005 with the "Internal Supervision Regulation" (ISR), institutionalizing the inner-party supervision system and the Interim Provisions on DICs' Role in Assisting the party Committees with the Organization and Coordination of Anti-Corruption Work. The terminology used in the battle against corruption was changed at the congress; "fighting corruption" became "fighting and preventing corruption". The Hu Jintao-led leadership, which lasted from the 16th–18th National Congress, saw growth in CCDI power and influence, demonstrated most clearly by the increased attendance of PSC members at CCDI plenary sessions.

Under Secretary Wu Guanzheng, the CCDI established its first central inspection teams in August 2003. These teams, led by retired ministerial-level officials and reporting to the CCDI rather than local party committees, were empowered to initiate investigations, conduct interviews, and review relevant documents. The opinion of a central inspection team was an important factor in determining whether or not an official was disciplined, and the teams played an important role in the expulsion of Shanghai party chief (and Politburo member) Chen Liangyu from the party because of corruption.

The dual-leadership system was reformed during Hu Jintao's term. In the aftermath of the Shanghai pension scandal, the central party leadership appointed the CDI leaders of the four direct-controlled municipalities (Beijing, Shanghai, Tianjin, and Chongqing) and suggested a preference for outsiders as CDI leaders in the provinces. Beginning in 2009, localities below the prefecture level began to abolish the practice of a control body in every party-controlled organization. Before the reforms, every organization (civil, party, or government) with an embedded party committee or party group had a corresponding CDI-style department. The reforms consolidated control and supervision resources (including finances and personnel) under the auspices of the prefecture- or county-level CDI, which became an "umbrella supervision organ" of all party-controlled bodies in its area of jurisdiction and those below it. The umbrella organization gave the CDI control of the staffing of party organizations it was tasked with overseeing, allowing more efficient use of CDI resources and reducing potential conflicts of interest arising from CDI staff involvement in the operations of a party committee it was supposed to regulate.

The CCDI underwent another round of reforms under general secretary Xi Jinping, elected in the immediate aftermath of the 18th National Congress in 2012. Xi and CCDI Secretary Wang Qishan further institutionalized CCDI independence from the day-to-day operations of the party, improving its ability to function as a bona fide control body. At the 3rd Plenum of the 18th Central Committee in the fall of 2013, the party declared that it would "strengthen the dual leadership system [over the CCDI] by making it more defined, procedure-oriented, and institutionalised." In practice, this signaled the intention of the leadership that CDIs across the country operate separate from the party apparatus headed by the party committees, with local CDIs responsible to higher-level CDIs in nearly all substantive respects. Beginning in 2014, CDI chiefs across the country began to shed concurrent executive positions which could create conflicts of interest (for example, a CDI chief also serving as a vice-mayor or department head); CDI personnel also began removing themselves from "leading groups" and similar policy-coordination and consultation groups. These changes were intended to free CDI resources to "solely focus on the work of enforcing discipline".

Since the 18th National Congress, the CCDI has established several new organizations, including four new discipline and inspection offices. On 28 March 2013, the Central Committee ordered the establishment of Propaganda and Organization Departments in the CCDI, the first such departments in a central-level institution other than the Central Committee. According to China scholar Willy Lam, the establishment of a CCDI Organization Department means "that the CCDI leadership can recruit cadres outside the established channels of the CCP Organisation Department, which has, since 1949, been responsible for the Party's human resources-related operations."

In 2014, the CCDI established an internal Office for the Supervision of Disciplinary System Officials. The office, an internal check on CCDI officials, ensures that officials charged with enforcing discipline operate within the rules themselves and has jurisdiction over CDI officials at all administrative levels. The CCDI intends "zero tolerance" towards CDI officials breaching discipline themselves, and they will be "exposed by name in the media" if they break the rules. That year, the CCDI set up offices in bodies directly reporting to the central committee (such as the Organization and Publicity Departments) and State Council bodies. These offices, known as "Commissioned Bodies", report directly to the CCDI and are not responsible to the institutions in which they are located. 2018 saw the Shuanggui system being replaced by the Liuzhi. In 2024, the CCDI disciplined 94,000 officials for "irresponsibility", "inaction," and "pretending to work".

== Organization ==
=== Central level ===
Leadership structure of the CCDI Secretary (1)
Deputy Secretary (numerous)
Secretary-General (1)
Standing Committee (~20 members)
Full commission (~130 members)

The secretary, known as the First Secretary during Chen Yun's term (1978–1987), is head of the CCDI. Elections of its secretary, deputy secretary, and secretary-general are held at its 1st Plenary Session, held immediately after a national congress. The CCDI proposes an elected secretary to the 1st Plenary Session of a central committee, which can approve or reject them. The CCDI Secretary has a number of elected deputies. Currently, there are eight deputy secretaries. Each CCDI Secretary since 2003 has concurrently headed the Central Leading Group for Inspection Work.

Since 1978, all CCDI heads have been members of the PSC, although Wei Jianxing was a member from 1997 to 2002, but not from 1992 to 1997. The 12th National Congress required that the CCDI head serve concurrently on the PSC, but this was rescinded by Zhao Ziyang at the 13th National Congress in 1987. Although most of Zhao Ziyang's reforms were later themselves rescinded, concurrent PSC membership was not reintroduced until the 15th National Congress in 1997.

The Standing Committee is the highest body when the CCDI is not convened for a plenary session. Elected by the 1st Plenary Session of the CCDI, it requires approval from the 1st plenary session of the Central Committee to take office. The Standing Committee presents a report to the CCDI at every plenary session; the latter is the only national-level organization, with the National People's Congress and the Central Committee, which holds at least one plenary session a year. CCDI plenary sessions, which discuss its past and future work, are usually held in January. The 18th Standing Committee has 19 members, one of whom (Huang Xiaowei) is a woman.

The CCDI employs about 1,000 people. Since the 1993 merger of its internal functions with the MOS, it has grown to 27 bureaus and offices. Of these, the Office for Discipline Inspection and Supervision (ODIS), the Case Hearing Office, and the Office for Circuit Inspection Work are the most important. ODIS and its ten divisions are responsible for investigating breaches of party discipline and unlawful acts by party members. Of the ten divisions, four investigate cases at the vice-ministerial level and above; the remaining six investigate "officials at the level of provincial governor, vice-governor, chair and vice-chair of provincial standing committees of the National People's Congress, chair and vice-chair of provincial Political Consultative Conferences, city mayors, and deputies." In addition, there are twelve institutions which are directly subordinate to the CCDI.

=== Lower levels and inspection teams ===
Below the central level, there are several commissions for discipline inspection (CDI). The CDI's composition is decided by the CDI a level above it, and endorsed by its party committee and the committee superior to it. The establishment of discipline commissions at the local level is decided by the upper-level party committee. The main duties and responsibilities of local CDIs are to educate party members on their duties and rights, preserve party discipline, uphold party decisions, see that party members exercise their duties in accordance with the party constitution, examine cases, and investigate corruption. It is expected to report its findings regularly to its corresponding-level party committee. If a member of the local party committee is involved in corruption, the local CDI should ask the party committee at the corresponding level and the CDI at the level above to approve a full investigation. Before the 2014 reforms, it was difficult for the CDIs to carry out their responsibilities. Although they no longer needed approval from the secretary of the corresponding-level party committee, CDI officials were often appointed to positions of power within the institutions they were tasked to supervise (see above). The 2004 reforms increased CDI independence from the party committee. They were previously elected by the corresponding-level party committee but beginning in 2004, CDI membership was selected by the upper-level CDI. The 3rd Plenary Session of the 18th Central Committee in 2013 again reformed the CCDI's structure, with each CDI directly responsible to the CCDI.

The Office for Circuit Inspection Work sends inspection teams throughout the country to help the local CDIs. In 2003, there were five inspection teams, and by 2013 the number had grown to twelve. In 2010, the CCDI was authorized to send inspection teams to the People's Liberation Army (PLA). Despite this, there are several weaknesses to its institutional design in the sense that certain informal aspects of CCP rule compete with formal procedures (that the CCDI and its lower-level organs are tasked with supervising) for hegemony. Examples are, as outlined by Xuezhi Guo, "vague institutional positions, incrementally declining effects as time goes by, vulnerability to patron-clientelism or guanxi network at the grassroots level, and the dilemma of 'open' or 'undercover' investigation". The CCDI and its inspection teams initiate ordinary and intensive inspection of party organizations at all levels and, in the eyes of many in the provinces, are a "tribunal of justice": handing down verdicts to the guilty and exonerating the innocent.

Inspection teams are not empowered to initiate formal investigations, make arrests, or mete out punishments. If an inspection team gathers on wrongdoing and corruption in general, the information is passed on to either the Organization Department or the CCDI. When an investigation is completed, they need to submit a report to the Central Leading Group for Inspection Work, to the region it inspected, and the individuals who were the targets of the investigation. The report is then uploaded on the CCDI's website and made public. The regulations which govern inspection team conduct states that they must: "Learn from the reports from local party committees; Participate in party disciplinary meetings; Manage whistleblower letters, phone calls, and visits; Regarding issues of party members or officials; Organize forums to understand public opinions of local leaders; Communicate with individuals; Review relevant documents and records; Conduct surveys and evaluate the opinions of the public; Visit the local bureau or individual department; and Consult with other government departments to gain better understand[ing] of the issues."

== Work with other institutions ==
=== Central Military Commission ===
The military has its own discipline-enforcement body, known as the Commission for Discipline Inspection of the Central Military Commission (CDICMC) and is modelled on the CCDI. The CDICMC has "dual responsibility" to the CCDI and the Central Military Commission, and its membership is selected by the Central Military Commission. The first military disciplinary organization was established in 1955 and was dissolved during the Cultural Revolution. The modern incarnation of the CDICMC was formed in January 1980 under the direction of the Central Committee of the Communist Party. Since 1990, the CDICMC's work has largely been carried out by the PLA's General Political Department, the military's highest political body. The head of the CDICMC is customarily also deputy chief of the General Political Department, and (since the 16th Party Congress in 2002) a concurrent Deputy Secretary of the Central Commission for Discipline Inspection.

Occasionally, the CCDI has directly intervened in cases involving high-ranking officers of the PLA. Direct CCDI involvement has only been cited in high-profile cases, such as Vice Admiral Wang Shouye in 2005 and Lieutenant General Gu Junshan in 2012. When the CDICMC completes such an investigation, the case is usually given to military prosecution authorities for court-martial. Unlike CCDI cases (whose conclusions are generally announced in press releases), details of CDICMC cases are rarely publicly recorded. The CDICMC will occasionally conduct an "initial investigation" of alleged wrongdoing by a military officer, then hand the case over to the CCDI for "further investigation".

=== National Supervisory Commission ===
The Ministry of Supervision (MOS) was established by the State Council in 1987 to supervise in "government departments, state organs and public officials, and maintaining administrative discipline." Since its inception, the MOS' jurisdiction was unclear. Most government personnel, as party officials, were under the purview of the CCDI. Before 1987, the CCDI was responsible for issuing administrative sanctions to public officials. Since it enforced party discipline and the MOS enforced state law, in theory "the two agencies operated in separate spheres". The reality was less clear-cut. Most public servants were party members, and the MOS and CCDI customarily began separate investigations of the same person. In these dual investigations, the CDIs (and sometimes the CCDI) claimed primary jurisdiction over cases involving important party figures and tried to prevent the MOS from doing its work. To solve this problem, the MOS and the CCDI were effectively merged in 1993–1994. Although their organisational identities remained separate, the internal offices of the MOS merged with the CCDI. Since then, the CCDI has conducted the work of the MOS. The Minister of Supervision customarily held the concurrent post of Deputy Secretary of the CCDI, and the organizations shared a website.

On 13 March 2018, as part of a broader reorganization of party and state bodies, the MOS was abolished and merged with the National Bureau of Corruption Prevention and the Supreme People's Procuratorate's General Administration of Anti-Corruption and Bribery to form the National Supervisory Commission (NSC). Unlike the MOS, which was under the State Council, NSC is directly responsible to the National People's Congress. The NSC is co-located with the CCDI, and has effectively functioned as the state arm of the CCDI, with its first director Yang Xiaodu serving as the Deputy Secretary of the CCDI. Unlike the CCDI, the NSC covers all employees of the public sector, of around 20% of whom are not CCP members.

== Duties and responsibilities ==
=== Inner-party supervision ===
According to its own regulations, safeguarding the political position of Xi and the Central Committee is, officially, the CCDI's highest duty. The CCDI (and its local affiliates) enforces the inner-party supervision system. Although the system's history dates back to the 1970s and 1980s, it was not formalized until the 2004 "Internal Supervision Regulation" (ISR). The ISR reaffirmed the powers of the CCDI, institutionalized the central inspection teams, and clearly separated the party's decision-making institutions from its supervisory ones. With the ISR, the CCP issued a list of member responsibilities subject to oversight by the CCDI and its local affiliates. Member supervision was not new. However, information on what was supervised (and explanations for why things were under supervision) was novel. Every party member is subject to supervision, but the ISR emphasizes that leaders would be its focus. This was probably in reaction to the fact that no institutions, except the central party leadership (including the local CDIs), had the de facto ability to supervise lower-level party institutions.

The ISR defines three forms of inner-party supervision: top-to-bottom, bottom-to-top, and peer-to-peer. Of the three, bottom-to-top is the least institutionalized and was presented as the moral – but not institutional – responsibility of ordinary party members. The mechanism for lodging complaints against higher-level party officials or proposing their dismissal was unspecified. According to Ting Gong, the main problem is that if an ordinary party member lodges a complaint or accuses an official of corruption, "there is no guarantee that personal petitions will be accommodated or even processed as they are subject to further investigation and the approval of higher-level authorities".

The top-to-bottom system requires party committees at higher levels to supervise lower-level committees. According to the ISR, the central party leadership should regularly send central inspection teams to regions, state organizations, and state-owned enterprises. The central inspection teams' structure was reformed by the ISR. Before it, they were ad hoc institutions in the fight against corruption. The ISR introduced formal criteria for joining a central inspection team and empowered its investigative authority.

Peer-to-peer supervision is defined as regular democratic life meetings and the duty of standing committees to report their work to the party committee to whom they are responsible. The primary goal of peer-to-peer supervision is to strengthen party members' subjective responsibility by making them feel collectively responsible for the party as a whole. This system is supervised by the party committee and the CDI at the next higher level.

=== Jurisdiction ===
The jurisdiction of the party discipline inspection system mirrors that of the MOS, with the CCDI responsible for cases involving breaches of party discipline and state law by party members. Like the MOS, the CCDI lacks judicial authority and is limited to investigating allegations of corruption and breaches of party discipline. Since the CCDI does not have the power to prosecute, it is supposed to transfer cases (after investigation) to the Supreme People's Procuratorate or the Supreme People's Court. Despite this, its formal jurisdiction is loosely defined. The CDI's ability to begin investigations and administer party sanctions has often led to the slow transfer (or sometimes no transfer) of cases to the Supreme People's Procuratorate.

According to Graham Young, the CCDI's "responsibilities deal with four types of offences: [w]ork mistakes, [p]olitical mistakes, [l]ine mistakes, [and] [c]ounter-revolutionary actions". Andrew Wederman wrote that by looking at the "offences based on annual reports by provincial DICs contained in provincial yearbooks", its responsibility includes 20 types of offences; "[a]rbitrary and dictatorial exercise of power, [a]narchism, [f]actionalism, [f]avouritism, [i]nsubordination, [h]eterodoxy (such as bourgeois spiritual pollution, leftism), [p]rivilege seeking, [n]epotism and use of Party authority to advance their families, friends and relatives, [b]ureaucratism, [a]dministrative inefficiency, [c]ommandism, [h]oarding, [p]etty corruption, [f]raud, [e]mbezzlement, [t]heft, [s]muggling, [b]ribery, [i]llegal acquisition of and dealing in foreign exchange, [and] [w]asting and squandering public funds". According to Jeffrey Becker, "CDIC handbooks and regulations typically list six general types of mistakes (cuowu); political, economic, organisational, dereliction of one's duty, opposition to the party's socialist morals, and violations of integrity laws and regulations." Although the CCDI overlaps the MOS, it has more responsibilities since it is obligated to prevent breaches of party rules, norms, and other non-criminal behaviour. The party constitution vaguely defines the CCDI's jurisdiction:

Resolutely implement the Party's basic line, principles, and policies ... correctly exercise the powers entrusted to them by the people, be honest and upright, work hard for the people, make themselves an example, carry forward the style of hard work and plain living, forge closer ties with the masses, uphold the Party's mass line, accept criticism and supervision by the masses, oppose bureaucratism, and oppose the unhealthy trend of abusing one's power for personal gain.

=== Petition system, investigative procedures, and Liuzhi ===
For a case to be investigated, a person needs to petition the CCDI. Although the main petition office is the Complaints Office, petitions are usually sent to other offices and institutions (such as the Supreme People's Court, Supreme People's Procuratorate, the National People's Congress, and party leadership as high as the PSC) as well. Petitions may also be filed on the CCDI website, and the commission receives cases through the Office for Circuit Inspection Work (which sends inspection teams throughout the country). In a case handled by former ODIS Third Division director and Case Hearing Office director Li Huiran, a petition was sent to all department heads in the ministry employing the petitioner, several offices of the CCDI and PSC members Jiang Zemin, Li Peng, Zhu Rongji, and Wei Jianxing.

An investigation has eight steps: "preliminary evidence and complaint management, preliminary confirmation of disciplinary violations, approval for opening the case, investigation and evidence collection, case hearing, implementation of disciplinary sanctions, appeal by the disciplined official, and continued supervision and management of the case". The first step begins with the receipt of a petition, which is formally accepted when the CCDI has proof (or suspicion) of wrongdoing. This process depends on the position of the accused; if the person has a vice-ministerial or deputy-gubernatorial rank, the investigation must first be approved by the CCDI Standing Committee. If approved, the CCDI Standing Committee will request permission from the PSC for a full investigation. An investigation of a provincial party leader must be accepted by the Politburo. To investigate a member of the Politburo or the PSC, the full backing of the PSC and retired high-level leaders is required. When a case is approved, the subject enters Liuzhi, which replaced the previous Shuanggui ("double designation") system. In the Shuanggui system, the subject had to appear at a "designated location at a designated time." During Shuanggui, the subject is questioned about specific disciplinary violations. The length of Shuanggui is unspecified, and the subject is not protected by the state legal system. This system gives the CCDI precedence over the legal system in the investigation of party leaders. According to Chinese media, Shuanggui was instituted to prevent a subject's protection by his patron or a network (guanxi) and scholars such as Ting Gong and Connie Meaney agree that guanxi is a genuine threat to CCDI investigative teams. The suspect is then subject to "off-site detention" "to prevent interference from 'local protectionism' and 'factionalism'" (guanxi), preserving the investigation's integrity.

The subject is detained in an unspecified location under a 24-hour suicide watch by a team of six to nine "accompanying protectors" (as they are officially called), working eight-hour shifts. Shuanggui does not condone corporal punishment and the accused is, in theory, respectfully treated until proven guilty. Despite this proscription of force, according to Flora Sapio it "can easily occur because all basic procedural guarantees are removed as soon as shuanggui begins". Problems with Shuanggui, such as forced confessions, have occurred with inadequately-trained officials in areas controlled by local CDIs. Liuzhi expands beyond CCP members to the entire public sector, academics, and business.

=== Regulations ===
Party regulations and Party discipline are stricter than State laws; all levels' Party organisations and the broad Party members and cadres must not only be models of abiding by State laws, they must also put strict demands on themselves according to the even higher standards of Party regulations and Party discipline, they must strengthen their ideals and convictions, put the purpose of the Party into practice, and firmly struggle with acts violating law and discipline. Acts violating Party regulations and Party discipline must be dealt with severely, symptomatic and tendentious problems must be grasped early, when they are small, in order to prevent that small mistakes ferment into big mistakes, and violation of discipline becomes violation of the law.

— The 18th CCP Central Committee's "Decision Concerning Major Questions in Comprehensively Moving Governing the Country Forward According to the Law", published in 2014

CDIs at every level have, as one of their most important duties, the authority to issue and interpret regulations. In recent years, the CCDI has issued several regulations on behalf of the central committee, including "Internal Supervision Regulation" in 2004; "Regulations on Inner-Party Supervision", "Provisions on the CCP's Disciplinary Penalties" and "Provisions About Establishing the Responsibility System for Party Construction and Clean Government" in 2005, and "Interim Stipulations: Leading Cadres' Integrity Report" in 2006.

The importance of law in the struggle against corruption has been emphasized since the early 1980s. Deng pointed out in 1980 that the anti-corruption effort was a political struggle which, to be successful, must be fought in an institutional environment. At the 4th Plenary Session of the 15th CCDI in 2000, Jiang drew a similar conclusion: "The most important thing is to uphold and improve a system of institutions which can guarantee the Party's strong leadership and socialist prosperity, and make sure that the system is functioning by means of laws, regulations, policies, and education." Despite this, until the 16th National Congress, the CCP's anti-corruption system was based on campaign-style events rather than formal procedures (partially due to the 1940s Yan'an Rectification Movement and its legacy). The idea that campaigns – not institutions – were the best weapon against corruption predominated under Deng, and is best seen in the establishment of the Central Party Rectification Steering Committee during the 1980s. This was the CCP central leadership's preferred way to combat corruption, since its enforcement depended largely on the leadership. However, the sharp increase in corrupt activities during the 1990s led the party to change course.

Under Wei Jianxing, the 15th CCDI reviewed an estimated 1,600 corruption-related party regulations and documents in the run-up to the 16th National Congress. Of these, an estimated 1,100 were still considered viable. During this period, it published "Plan for Building Honest Morals and Controlling Corruption from 2004 to 2007" and the six-volume "Complete Regulations on Building Honest Morals and Controlling Corruption Within the Party" in an effort to institutionalize the party's anti-corruption system. To formalize its procedures, the 16th CCDI Standing Committee passed regulations requiring all local CDIs to combat corruption with lawful methods. Signaling their serious intent, the CCDI, the CCP's Organization Department, the MOS, and the State-owned Assets Supervision and Administration Commission issued joint "Regulations on Honestly Conducting Business by Leaders of the State-Run Enterprises" in 2005. According to CCP analyst Shao Daosheng, "The pace of institutional anti-corruption [development] by the CCP has been unprecedented."

== See also ==
- Central Control Commission of the Communist Party of the Soviet Union
- Central Party Control Commission of the Socialist Unity Party of Germany
- Ministry of Supervision of the People's Republic of China
- Supervision Commission of the People's Republic of China
