= Membership of the Politburo Standing Committee =

Membership of the Politburo Standing Committee may refer to:

== Electoral terms ==
=== China ===
- 4th Central Standing Committee of the Chinese Communist Party, April–May 1927
- 5th Politburo Standing Committee of the Chinese Communist Party, 1927–1928
- 6th Politburo Standing Committee of the Chinese Communist Party, 1928–1945
- 7th Secretariat/Politburo Standing Committee of the Chinese Communist Party, 1945–1956
- 8th Politburo Standing Committee of the Chinese Communist Party, 1956–1969
- 9th Politburo Standing Committee of the Chinese Communist Party, 1969–1973
- 10th Politburo Standing Committee of the Chinese Communist Party, 1973–1977
- 11th Politburo Standing Committee of the Chinese Communist Party, 1977–1982
- 12th Politburo Standing Committee of the Chinese Communist Party, 1982–1987
- 13th Politburo Standing Committee of the Chinese Communist Party, 1987–1992
- 14th Politburo Standing Committee of the Chinese Communist Party, 1992–1997
- 15th Politburo Standing Committee of the Chinese Communist Party, 1997–2002
- 16th Politburo Standing Committee of the Chinese Communist Party, 2002–2007
- 17th Politburo Standing Committee of the Chinese Communist Party, 2007–2012
- 18th Politburo Standing Committee of the Chinese Communist Party, 2012–2017
- 19th Politburo Standing Committee of the Chinese Communist Party, 2017–2022
- 20th Politburo Standing Committee of the Chinese Communist Party, 2022–2017

=== Vietnam ===
- 8th Politburo Standing Committee of the Communist Party of Vietnam, 1996–2001

== Members ==
- Longest-serving members of the Politburo Standing Committee of the Chinese Communist Party
