= Politburo Standing Committee of the Chinese Communist Party =

Committee of the top leadership of the Chinese Communist Party

Standing Committee of the Political Bureau of the Central Committee of the Communist Party of China 中国共产党中央政治局常务委员会

Information
- General Secretary: Xi Jinping
- Members: Xi Jinping; Li Qiang; Zhao Leji; Wang Huning; Cai Qi; Ding Xuexiang; Li Xi
- Elected by: Central Committee
- Responsible to: Politburo
- Seats: 7 (20th Committee)

Meeting place
- Qinzheng Hall, Zhongnanhai; Beijing, China

Standing Committee of the Central Politburo of the Communist Party of China
- Simplified Chinese: 中国共产党中央政治局常务委员会
- Traditional Chinese: 中國共產黨中央政治局常務委員會
- Literal meaning: China Communist Party Central Politburo Standing Committee
Transcriptions
Standard Mandarin
- Hanyu Pinyin: Zhōngguó Gòngchǎndǎng Zhōngyāng Zhèngzhìjú Chángwù Wěiyuánhuì

Abbreviation(s)
- Simplified Chinese: 中央政治局常委会
- Traditional Chinese: 中央政治局常委會
- Literal meaning: Central Politburo Standing-Committee
Transcriptions
Standard Mandarin
- Hanyu Pinyin: Zhōnggòng Zhōngyāng Zhèngzhìjú Chángwěihuì

The Politburo Standing Committee (PSC), officially the Standing Committee of the Political Bureau of the Central Committee of the Communist Party of China, is a committee consisting of the top leadership of the Chinese Communist Party (CCP) and the state, as some of its members concurrently hold the most senior positions within the state council. Historically it has been composed of five to eleven members, and currently has seven members. Its officially mandated purpose is to conduct policy discussions and make decisions on major issues when the Politburo, a larger decision-making body, is not in session. According to the party's constitution, the general secretary of the Central Committee must also be a member of the Politburo Standing Committee.

According to the party's Constitution, the party's Central Committee elects the Politburo Standing Committee. The method by which membership is determined has evolved over time. In turn, the Politburo chooses the Politburo Standing Committee through secretive negotiations. The Standing Committee functions as the epicenter of the CCP's power and leadership, and its membership has ranged from five to eleven people. During the Mao Zedong era, Mao himself selected and expelled members, while during the Deng Xiaoping era, consultations among party elders on the Central Advisory Commission determined membership. Since the 1990s, Politburo membership has been determined through deliberations and straw polls by incumbent and retired members of both the Politburo and the Standing Committee. No woman has ever served on the PSC. The PSC is theoretically responsible to the Politburo, which is in turn responsible to the larger Central Committee. Additionally, because China is a one-party state, Standing Committee decisions must be converted into State Council or NPC regulations to acquire the force of law. Its membership is closely watched by both the national media as well as political watchers abroad. Historically, the role of the PSC has varied and evolved. During the Cultural Revolution, for example, the PSC had little power.

The membership of the PSC is strictly ranked in protocol sequence. Historically, the General Secretary (or Party Chairman) has been ranked first; the rankings of other leaders have varied over time. Since the 1990s, the General Secretary, the State President, the Premier of the State Council, first-ranked Vice Premier, the Chairman of the Standing Committee of the National People's Congress, the Chairman of the National Committee of the Chinese People's Political Consultative Conference, the Secretary of the Central Commission for Discipline Inspection, and the first-ranking member of the CCP Secretariat have consistently also been members of the Politburo Standing Committee, though their relative seniority has shifted between congresses.

== Terminology ==
The Politburo Standing Committee is technically responsible to the Politburo of the Chinese Communist Party. In Chinese political usage, a "Standing Committee" (常务委员会; Chángwù Wěiyuánhuì) simply refers to a body that carries out the day-to-day affairs of its parent organ, in this case, the Politburo. "Politburo Standing Committee" is the most commonly used name to refer to the body in English-language media. It is sometimes abbreviated PSC or PBSC (if "Politburo" is written as "Political Bureau"). It can also be referred to informally as simply the "Standing Committee". In its official English-language press releases, Chinese state media refers to the body by its lengthier, formal name, "The Standing Committee of the Political Bureau of the CPC Central Committee". In turn, its members are officially referred to as "Members of Standing Committee of the Political Bureau of the CPC Central Committee". These official forms are rarely used by English-language newspapers outside of mainland China.

In official Chinese-language announcements, the most commonly used name for members of the body is Zhōnggòng Zhōngyāng Zhèngzhìjú Chángwěi (中共中央政治局常委); this is an abbreviation of the much lengthier official title of Zhōngguó Gòngchǎndǎng Zhōngyāng Zhèngzhìjú Chángwù Wěiyuánhuì Wěiyuán (中国共产党中央政治局常务委员会委员). As even the officially abbreviated terminology may still be too lengthy and unwieldy, some media outlets refer to PSC members as Zhèngzhìjú Chángwěi (政治局常委) or simply Chángwěi (常委). However, note that without any context, Changwei may still be an ambiguous term, as provincial and local party committees all have a Standing Committee, the members of which can also be known as Changwei.

== History ==
=== Early history ===
One of the reactions that the CCP had upon the Nanchang Uprising occurring was the establishment of the provisional Politburo under Qu Qiubai. The first Standing Committee was formed in July 1928, at a meeting of the 6th Central Committee of the Chinese Communist Party. Near the 1st plenary session of the 8th National Congress of the Chinese Communist Party in 1956, the Standing Committee was replaced by the Central Secretariat of the Chinese Communist Party. During the early history of the CCP it was seen as the highest central body that was intended to carry out day-to-day work of the Party's Central Committee. It was composed of the top leadership figures of the larger Political Bureau (i.e., the Politburo). Unlike most other Communist parties in the world modeled after the party of Lenin, the CCP formed a Standing Committee because the Politburo (normally the highest organ in a communist party) was considered too large and unwieldy to make decisions effectively.

=== Cultural Revolution ===
In the early days of the Cultural Revolution, the Politburo Standing Committee ceased normal operations, as many of its key members, such as Chinese President Liu Shaoqi and Vice Premier Deng Xiaoping, fell out of favour with Chairman Mao. Real power was concentrated in the Cultural Revolution Group, which was nominally reporting to the Politburo Standing Committee but in fact was a separate "centre of authority" that acted mostly on its own accord. At the 9th National Congress of the Chinese Communist Party, radical supporters of Mao, Chen Boda, and Kang Sheng, gained seats on the Politburo Standing Committee, and it resumed a somewhat normal functioning. The last years of the Cultural Revolution were dominated by internal chaos. Between 1975 and 1976, PSC members Kang Sheng, Zhou Enlai, Zhu De, and Mao all died. Deng Xiaoping was purged. During this time the body lost any semblance of a functioning policy-making or executive organ, and it met only on an ad hoc basis. By Mao's death in September 1976, the only members who still attended meetings were Hua Guofeng, Zhang Chunqiao, Wang Hongwen, and Ye Jianying, with Zhang and Wang being members of the Gang of Four. On 6 October, Hua Guofeng called a PSC meeting ostensibly to discuss Mao's legacy and memorial arrangements, inviting the active PSC members to attend. Wang and Zhang were both arrested at the meeting and accused of "counter-revolutionary crimes". Thereafter, only Ye and Hua continued their official duties. A functioning PSC was not restored until 1977.

=== After economic reforms ===
After taking power in 1978, one of the goals of Deng Xiaoping was to strengthen the power of the party and institutionalize bodies such as the Politburo and its Standing Committee. For much of the 1980s, the PSC was restored as the party's supreme decision-making body. The committee was again organized on the basis of democratic centralism, that is, decisions were to be made based on consensus, and, failing that, decisions are taken by majority vote; once a decision is taken the entire body speaks with one voice. However, the PSC competed with retired party elders (organized as the Central Advisory Commission, though they made most of their decisions informally) for influence. Deng Xiaoping himself bridged the two bodies, and his informal clout translated to great political power personally. In 1987, Deng and other party elders ousted then General Secretary Hu Yaobang from the PSC, replacing him with Zhao Ziyang. In 1989, Deng and various party elders ordered the military to intervene in the 1989 Tiananmen Square protests without gaining the consensus of the PSC. Zhao was opposed to declaring martial law and broke with other members of the PSC, notably Premier Li Peng. In the aftermath, Zhao and Hu Qili were removed from the PSC at the Fourth Plenum in 1989, largely by fiat of Deng and the elders rather than institutional procedure, to be replaced by Jiang Zemin and Li Ruihuan.

The operation of the Standing Committee has remained largely stable since Tiananmen in 1989. The 1989 Plenum was the last occasion where a major reshuffle of the PSC occurred. At the 14th Party Congress in 1992, seven people – Jiang, Li Peng, Qiao Shi, Li Ruihuan, Zhu Rongji, Liu Huaqing, and Hu Jintao – were named to the Standing Committee, this arrangement remained unchanged until the regularly scheduled 15th Party Congress in 1997, where Qiao Shi and Liu Huaqing retired and were replaced by Wei Jianxing and Li Lanqing, showing the first signs that the PSC would become a term-based body operating on a fixed schedule. Liu Huaqing was also the last PSC member with a military background. In 1999, Vice President Hu Jintao also became Vice Chairman of the Central Military Commission, as he was being groomed to succeed Jiang. This was the first time Vice President had occupied the post of Vice Chairman of the CMC.

At the 16th Party Congress held in 2002, the Standing Committee was expanded from seven to nine members. Some political observers speculated that the expansion was done in order to stack the new Standing Committee with loyalists of Jiang Zemin, though this characterization has been disputed. During Hu Jintao's term as General Secretary (2002–2012), the PSC could be understood as a "leadership collective" or a "joint presidency"; that is, essentially a body operating on consensus that executes powers normally granted to a single officeholder. The 16th Party Congress also saw Li Changchun gain a seat on the PSC without a formally defined portfolio, though he was widely considered to be the "propaganda chief". Huang Ju died in June 2007, becoming the first sitting PSC member to die in office since 1976. His vacancy was not filled ostensibly because it was only a few months preceding a Party Congress, making the body operate temporarily with an eight-member structure. (Note: Indeed, this was the only time since 1992 that the Standing Committee member had not served out an entire term on the body.) The 17th Party Congress maintained roughly the same structure as the 16th.

At the 18th Party Congress held in 2012, membership of the PSC was yet again reduced to seven members. The head of the Political and Legal Affairs Commission did not feature in the new Standing Committee, neither did the vice-president. The positions of executive secretary of the Secretariat and that of "propaganda chief" were consolidated into one person, Liu Yunshan.

=== Contemporary selection method and considerations ===
Selection of members is believed to be largely the result of high-level deliberations among incumbent members of the party's Politburo and PSC as well as retired PSC members. Prospective candidates for membership in the PSC typically rely on individual members of this high level group to act as their patrons. The current and former Politburo members conduct several rounds of deliberations interspersed with a series of straw polls to determine their support for the candidacy of new Politburo and PSC members. These straw polls are not binding and instead reflect the evolving consensus of the group on a new member's candidacy. The Politburo may also conduct a straw poll of all incumbent Central Committee members on the candidacy of new Politburo and PSC members, but this poll is only consultative. The process of selecting the new Politburo and PSC begins with a closed door session of the incumbent PSC at Beidaihe in the last summer before the Party Congress convenes in the fall. The list of Politburo and PSC candidates for the Central Committee to formally confirm is usually complete several weeks before the Party Congress. No woman has ever served on the PSC.

According to informed academic observers such as Cheng Li, a scholar at Brookings Institution, and Susan Shirk of the Graduate School of International Relations and Pacific Studies, rise in the Chinese political system and selection to the Standing Committee depends more on loyalty to powerful patrons than on ability. It was widely believed, for example, that the Standing Committee line-up of the 16th Party Congress included several members who were elevated based on their relationship with outgoing General Secretary Jiang Zemin, including, most notably, Zeng Qinghong, Huang Ju, and Jia Qinglin. Much has been written on the divide between Princelings and the Tuanpai (Youth League faction) between the 16th and 18th Congresses, though it is not precisely known to what extent factional identity played in the selection of PSC members.

Seniority also played an important role. It was established convention that a member of the PSC must have served for at least one term on the Politburo prior to entry to the PSC. However, this "rule" had been broken several times by those destined for party leader or the premiership, most notably with Zhu Rongji and Hu Jintao in 1992, and Li Keqiang and Xi Jinping in 2007. Jiang Zemin was also in the middle of serving out his first term on the Politburo before he was suddenly made General Secretary and thus a member of the PSC in 1989.

Since the late 1990s, nearly all PSC members have experience as a party chief of a province or a direct-controlled municipality. Of the 29 Standing Committee members inaugurated to the body since 1997, only six individuals have not held regional party chief positions: Li Peng, Wen Jiabao, Li Lanqing, Luo Gan, Liu Yunshan, Wang Huning, and Ding Xuexiang; (Note: Li Lanqing served as vice-mayor of Tianjin, Luo Gan the vice-governor of Henan, and Liu Yunshan the party chief of Chifeng, among other roles) of these, only three – Li Peng, Wen Jiabao, and Wang Huning have never served in a regional leadership role.

Age is also key. For instance, since 1989, all Standing Committee members have been at least 50 years old at the time of their appointment. Hu Jintao was 50 upon his appointment to the PSC at the 14th Party Congress in 1992. Xi Jinping was 54 and Li Keqiang was 52 at their appointment to the PSC at the 17th Party Congress in 2007. At the same time, since the 16th Party Congress in 2002, PSC members who were 68 or older at the time of a Party Congress have retired without exception. This has been known as the rule of "seven up, eight down", referring to the fact that if a PSC member is 68 or older at the time of a party congress, he must retire, but if he is 67 or younger, he may still enter the committee. Recently, however, doubt has been cast over this "rule". A senior party cadre named Deng Maosheng, in a statement to state-run news agency Xinhua in October 2016, stated that "The strict boundaries of 'seven up, eight down' don’t exist. This is something from folklore, and cannot be trusted."

In 2002, apart from Hu Jintao, the entire PSC retired and was replaced. Strict age-based retirement instituted in the CCP meant de facto term limits and relatively high turnover, with the vast majority of members serving for one or two terms. Since 1989, the only two PSC members to have served more than three terms on the body has been Hu Jintao, who served for four terms between 1992 and 2012, and Xi Jinping, who is currently serving serving his fourth term. Policy views of ambitious aspirants are routinely concealed in order to gain the broadest level of consensus, with Hu Jintao being a prime example. Various theories have been proposed, mostly by academic outside of mainland China, to discern the 'factions' within a Standing Committee (often between "conservatives" and "reformers"), though in practice due to its opaque operations, faction membership has never been a hard-and-fast rule. Overly showy or high-profile 'campaigning' for the PSC, such as the actions of former Chongqing party secretary Bo Xilai, were considered detrimental to PSC selection.

== Functions ==
The Politburo Standing Committee comprises the highest-ranked officials and is the highest political decision-making body of the Chinese Communist Party and, by extension, the People's Republic of China. The PSC members are the center of political power in China. Organizationally below them are the Politburo, and then the Central Committee.

According to the Party Constitution, the party's Central Committee elects the Politburo Standing Committee during a plenary session. The Party Constitution also stipulates that General Secretary of the Central Committee must also be a member of the PSC. The General Secretary is responsible for convening the meetings of the PSC and decides their agenda. The PSC meets roughly every week, though its meetings are rarely publicized. The membership of the Politburo Standing Committee has ranged from five to nine people, but is currently at seven. All members of the PSC are national-level leaders. As of 2015, Politburo Standing Committee members receive a monthly salary of approximately US$1,833.

A Politburo meeting in October 2017 after the first plenary session of the 19th CCP Central Committee stipulated that the CCP Secretariat, the Central Commission for Discipline Inspection, the Leading Party Members Group of the Standing Committee of the National People's Congress, the Leading Party Members Group of the State Council, the Leading Party Members Group of the Chinese People's Political Consultative Conference, the Leading Party Members Group of the Supreme People's Court and the Leading Party Members Group of the Supreme People's Procuratorate must report their work to the Politburo and its Standing Committee every year.

== Historical membership and rankings ==
The following is a list of the historical composition of the Standing Committee since the formation of the Standing Committee of the CCP's 4th Central Bureau in 1927. Starting from 1943, those ranked first have consistently held the title of Chairman or General Secretary of the CCP. The remaining ranks vary.

- 4th CSC (elected April 1927): Qu Qiubai, Tan Pingshan, Zhang Guotao
- 5th PSC (elected May 1927): Chen Duxiu, Qu Qiubai, Zhang Guotao, Cai Hesen, Li Weihan, Zhou Enlai, Li Lisan, Zhang Tailei, Su Zhaozheng, Luo Yinong
- 6th PSC (elected July 1928): Xiang Zhongfa (D), Bo Gu (elevated January 1934), Qu Qiubai, Zhang Guotao, Cai Hesen, Zhou Enlai, Li Lisan, Su Zhaozheng (D), Xiang Ying, Zhang Wentian, Wang Ming
- 6th PSC (Zunyi re-shuffle, elected January 1935): Zhang Wentian, Mao Zedong (elevated July 1937), Zhou Enlai, Bo Gu, Wang Ming, Wang Jiaxiang, Chen Yun, Kang Sheng, Ren Bishi, Liu Shaoqi, Zhu De
- 7th Secretariat (elected June 1945): Mao Zedong, Zhou Enlai, Chen Yun, Ren Bishi (D), Zhu De, Liu Shaoqi
- 8th PSC (elected September 1956): Mao Zedong, Liu Shaoqi, Zhou Enlai, Zhu De, Chen Yun, Lin Biao (X), Deng Xiaoping
- 8th PSC (Cultural Revolution re-shuffle, elected August 1966): Mao Zedong, Lin Biao (X), Zhou Enlai, Tao Zhu, Chen Boda (X), Deng Xiaoping, Kang Sheng (X), Liu Shaoqi (R), Zhu De, Li Fuchun, Chen Yun
- 9th PSC (elected April 1969): Mao, Lin Biao (D, X), Zhou Enlai, Chen Boda (X), Kang Sheng (X)
- 10th PSC (elected August 1973): Mao (D), Hua Guofeng (elevated April 1976), Zhou Enlai (D), Wang Hongwen (X), Kang Sheng (D, X), Ye Jianying, Li Desheng, Zhu De (D), Zhang Chunqiao (X), Dong Biwu (D), Deng Xiaoping (elected January 1975)
- 11th PSC (elected August 1977): Hua Guofeng, Ye Jianying, Deng Xiaoping, Li Xiannian, Wang Dongxing (resigned February 1980), Chen Yun, Hu Yaobang, Zhao Ziyang (elected February 1980)
- 12th PSC (elected September 1982): Hu Yaobang (removed January 1987), Ye Jianying (resigned September 1985), Deng Xiaoping, Zhao Ziyang, Li Xiannian, Chen Yun
- 13th PSC (elected November 1987): Zhao Ziyang, Li Peng, Qiao Shi, Hu Qili, Yao Yilin
- 13th PSC (Post-Tiananmen re-shuffle, elected June 1989): Jiang Zemin, Li Peng, Qiao Shi, Yao Yilin, Song Ping, Li Ruihuan
- 14th PSC (elected October 1992): Jiang Zemin, Li Peng, Qiao Shi, Li Ruihuan, Zhu Rongji, Liu Huaqing, Hu Jintao
- 15th PSC (elected September 1997): Jiang Zemin, Li Peng, Zhu Rongji, Li Ruihuan, Hu Jintao, Wei Jianxing, Li Lanqing
- 16th PSC (elected November 2002): Hu Jintao, Wu Bangguo, Wen Jiabao, Jia Qinglin, Zeng Qinghong, Huang Ju (D), Wu Guanzheng, Li Changchun, Luo Gan
- 17th PSC (elected October 2007): Hu Jintao, Wu Bangguo, Wen Jiabao, Jia Qinglin, Li Changchun, Xi Jinping, Li Keqiang, He Guoqiang, Zhou Yongkang (X)
- 18th PSC (elected November 2012): Xi Jinping, Li Keqiang, Zhang Dejiang, Yu Zhengsheng, Liu Yunshan, Wang Qishan, Zhang Gaoli
- 19th PSC (elected October 2017): Xi Jinping, Li Keqiang, Li Zhanshu, Wang Yang, Wang Huning, Zhao Leji, Han Zheng
- 20th PSC (elected October 2022): Xi Jinping, Li Qiang, Zhao Leji, Wang Huning, Cai Qi, Ding Xuexiang, Li Xi

Notes:

- (D): Died in office.
- (X): Expelled from party (including posthumously)
- (R): Expelled from the party, then rehabilitated

== See also ==
- Longest-serving members of the Politburo Standing Committee of the Chinese Communist Party
- Standing Committee of the Central Committee of the Kuomintang
- Presidium of the Politburo of the Workers' Party of Korea
- Five pillars (Vietnam)
- Shanghai clique
