= Politics of Beijing =

The politics of Beijing are structured as a dual party-government system like all other governing institutions in the mainland of the People's Republic of China.

The mayor of Beijing is the highest-ranking official in the People's Government of Beijing. Since Beijing is a centrally administered municipality with the rank of a province, the mayor occupies the same level in the order of precedence as provincial governors. However, in the city's dual party-government governing system, the mayor is subordinate to the Beijing Municipal Committee Secretary of the Chinese Communist Party (CCP).

The office of Beijing Party Secretary (Chinese: 北京市委书记) has always historically been a high-profile post. Since the founding of the People's Republic, the Party Secretary of Beijing has almost always held a seat on the Politburo of the Chinese Communist Party, the country's top ruling organ. Because of Beijing's position as the national capital, the Secretary is also involved in major decision making of national events. Peng Zhen, the first Beijing party secretary, was an important political figure nationally, and was purged by Mao in the opening act of the Cultural Revolution. Xie Fuzhi, whose term lasted from 1967 to 1972, was concurrently China's top security official, and held significant influence nationally. Chen Xitong's (term 1992–95) political influence was considered a threat to the Shanghai clique that he was removed from the position and tried on corruption charges. When the People's Republic celebrated its 50th anniversary in 1999, it was Beijing Party Secretary Jia Qinglin (term 1997–2002) who presided over the festivities. Liu Qi (term 2002–2012) was the chair of the Beijing Organizing Committee for the Olympic Games, and spoke at both the opening and closing ceremonies of the games. Liu Qi also presided the celebration of 60th anniversary of the People's Republic of China in 2009.

== List of CCP secretaries ==
No.	Image	Name	Term start	Term end	Ref.
1		Peng Zhen (彭真) (1902–1997)	13 December 1948	May 1966	
2		Li Xuefeng (李雪峰) (1907–2003)	May 1966	January 1967	
3		Xie Fuzhi (谢富治) (1909–1972)	January 1967	26 March 1972	
4		Wu De (吴德) (1913–1995)	April 1972	October 1978	
5		Lin Hujia (林乎加) (1916–2018)	October 1978	January 1981	
6		Duan Junyi (段君毅) (1910–2004)	January 1981	August 1984	
7		Li Ximing (李锡铭) (1926–2008)	August 1984	December 1992	
8		Chen Xitong (陈希同) (1930–2013)	December 1992	April 1995	
9		Wei Jianxing (尉健行) (1931–2015)	April 1995	25 August 1997	
10		Jia Qinglin (贾庆林) (born 1940)	25 August 1997	22 October 2002	
11		Liu Qi (刘淇) (born 1942)	22 October 2002	3 July 2012	
12		Guo Jinlong (郭金龙) (born 1947)	3 July 2012	27 May 2017	
13		Cai Qi (蔡奇) (born 1955)	27 May 2017	13 November 2022	
14		Yin Li (尹力) (born 1962)	13 November 2022	Incumbent	

== List of chairmen of Beijing People's Congress ==
No.	Name	Term start	Term end
1	Jia Tingsan (贾庭三) (1912–1984)	1979	1983
2	Zhao Pengfei (赵鹏飞) (1920–2005)	1983	1993
3	Zhang Jianmin (张健民) (born 1931)	1993	2001
4	Yu Junbo (于均波) (born 1941)	2001	2007
5	Du Deyin (杜德印) (born 1951)	2007	2017
6	Li Wei (李伟) (born 1958)	2017	2023
6	Li Xiuling (李秀领) (born 1962)	2023	Incumbent

== List of mayors ==
No.	Officeholder	Term of office		Political party	Ref.
No.	Officeholder	Took office	Left office	Political party	Ref.
Mayor of the Beiping Municipal People's Government
1	Ye Jianying (1897–1986)	8 December 1948	9 September 1949	Chinese Communist Party	
2	Nie Rongzhen (1897–1986)	9 September 1949	30 September 1949	Chinese Communist Party	
Mayor of the Beijing Municipal People's Government
(2)	Nie Rongzhen (1897–1986)	30 September 1949	26 February 1951	Chinese Communist Party	
3	Peng Zhen (1902–1997)	26 February 1951	August 1954	Chinese Communist Party	
Mayor of the Beijing Municipal People's Committee
(3)	Peng Zhen (1902–1997)	August 1954	23 May 1966	Chinese Communist Party	
4	Wu De (1913–1995)	23 May 1966	20 April 1967	Chinese Communist Party	
Director of the Beijing Revolutionary Committee
5	Xie Fuzhi (1909–1972)	20 April 1967	26 March 1972	Chinese Communist Party	
6	Wu De (1913–1995)	May 1972	9 October 1978	Chinese Communist Party	
7	Lin Hujia (1916–2018)	9 October 1978	13 December 1978	Chinese Communist Party	
Mayor of the Beijing Municipal People's Government
(7)	Lin Hujia (1916–2018)	13 December 1978	25 January 1981	Chinese Communist Party	
8	Jiao Ruoyu (1915–2020)	25 January 1981	24 March 1983	Chinese Communist Party	
9	Chen Xitong (1930–2013)	24 March 1983	February 1993	Chinese Communist Party	
10	Li Qiyan (1938–2020)	February 1993	October 1996	Chinese Communist Party	
11	Jia Qinglin (born 1940)	February 1997 (acting from October 1996)	February 1999	Chinese Communist Party	
12	Liu Qi (born 1942)	February 1999	January 2003	Chinese Communist Party	
13	Meng Xuenong (born 1949)	19 January 2003	20 April 2003	Chinese Communist Party	
14	Wang Qishan (born 1948)	February 2004 (acting from 20 April 2003)	30 November 2007	Chinese Communist Party	
15	Guo Jinlong (born 1947)	January 2008 (acting from 30 November 2007)	25 July 2012	Chinese Communist Party	
16	Wang Anshun (born 1957)	28 January 2013 (acting from 25 July 2012)	31 October 2016	Chinese Communist Party	
17	Cai Qi (born 1955)	20 January 2017 (acting from 31 October 2016)	27 May 2017	Chinese Communist Party	
18	Chen Jining (born 1964)	30 January 2018 (acting from 27 May 2017)	28 October 2022	Chinese Communist Party	
19	Yin Yong (born 1969)	19 January 2023 (acting from 28 October 2022)	Incumbent	Chinese Communist Party	

== List of chairmen of CPPCC Beijing Committee ==
No.	Name	Term start	Term end
1	Liu Ren (刘仁) (1909–1973)	1955	1967
2	Ding Guoyu (丁国钰) (1916–2015)	November 1977	December 1979
3	Zhao Pengfei (赵鹏飞) (1920–2005)	December 1979	March 1983
4	Liu Daosheng (刘导生) (1913–2014)	March 1983	March 1985
5	Fan Jin (范瑾) (1919–2009)	March 1985	May 1986
6	Bai Jiefu (白介夫) (1921–2013)	May 1986	1993
7	Wang Daming (王大明) (born 1929)	1993	1998
8	Chen Guangwen (陈广文) (born 1936)	1998	January 2003
9	Cheng Shi'e (程世峨) (born 1940)	January 2003	January 2006
10	Yang Anjiang (阳安江) (born 1945)	January 2006	January 2011
11	Wang Anshun (王安顺) (born 1957)	January 2011	January 2013
12	Ji Lin (吉林) (born 1962)	January 2013	January 2022
13	Wei Xiaodong (魏小东) (born 1961)	January 2022	Incumbent

== List of the Chairmen of Beijing Supervisory Committee ==
No.	Name	Term start	Term end
1	Zhang Shuofu (张硕辅) (born 1965)	January 2017	July 2018
2	Chen Yong (陈雍) (born 1966)	January 2019	July 2021
3	Chen Jian (陈健) (born 1964)	November 2021	Incumbent

== See also ==
- List of current district-level leaders of Beijing
- Politics of Chongqing
- Politics of Shanghai
- Politics of Tianjin
