= 9th Politburo Standing Committee of the Chinese Communist Party =

The 9th Politburo Standing Committee of the Chinese Communist Party, formally the Standing Committee of the Political Bureau of the 9th Central Committee of the Communist Party of China, was elected by the 1st plenary session of the 9th Central Committee in 1969, in the aftermath of the 9th National Congress of the Chinese Communist Party (CCP). It was preceded by the CCP's 8th Politburo Standing Committee and was succeeded by the 10th in 1973.

== Composition ==
=== 1st plenary session (1969–1970) ===
Members of the Politburo Standing Committee of the 1st plenary session of the 9th Central Committee
Rank	Officeholder	Hanzi	8th PSC	2nd PLE	Birth	PM	Death	Birthplace	No. of offices	Ref.
1	Mao Zedong	毛泽东	Old	Renewed	1893	1921	1976	Hunan	Two: Party office; Chairman, Central Committee; Military office; Chairman, Central Military Commission of the Central Committee	
2	Lin Biao	林彪	Old	Coup	1907	1925	1971	Hubei	Five: Party office; First Vice Chairman, Central Committee; State offices; First-ranked Vice Premier, State Council of the People's Republic of China; Minister of National Defense, People's Republic of China; Military offices; Vice Chairman, Central Military Commission of the Central Committee; Vice Chairman, National Defense Council	
3	Zhou Enlai	周恩来	Old	Renewed	1898	1921	1976	Jiangsu	Two: State office; Premier, State Council of the People's Republic of China; Organisational office; Chairman, National Committee of the Chinese People's Political Consultative Conference	
4	Chen Boda	陈伯达	Old	Not	1904	1927	1989	Fujian	One: Party office; Chairman, Central Cultural Revolution Group	
5	Kang Sheng	康生	Old	Renewed	1898	1925	1975	Shandong	One: State office; Vice Chairman, Standing Committee of the National People's Congress	

=== 2nd plenary session (1970–1973) ===
Members of the Politburo Standing Committee of the 2nd plenary session of the 9th Central Committee
Rank	Officeholder	Hanzi	1st PLE	10th PSC	Birth	PM	Death	Birthplace	No. of offices	Ref.
1	Mao Zedong	毛泽东	Old	Reelected	1893	1921	1976	Hunan	Two: Party office; Chairman, Central Committee; Military office; Chairman, Central Military Commission	
2	Zhou Enlai	周恩来	Old	Old	1898	1921	1976	Jiangsu	Two: State office; Premier, State Council of the People's Republic of China; Organisational office; Chairman, National Committee of the Chinese People's Political Consultative Conference	
3	Kang Sheng	康生	Old	Reelected	1898	1925	1975	Shandong	Two: Party office; Leader, Central Organization and Propaganda Leading Group; State office; Vice Chairman, Standing Committee of the National People's Congress	
