= 7th Secretariat of the Chinese Communist Party =

The 7th Secretariat of the Chinese Communist Party, formally the Secretariat of the 7th Central Committee of the Communist Party of China, was elected by the 1st plenary session of the 7th Central Committee in 1945, in the aftermath of the 7th National Congress of the Chinese Communist Party (CCP). It was preceded by the CCP's 6th Politburo Standing Committee and was succeeded by the 8th Politburo Standing Committee in 1956.

Despite its name, this institution is more akin to the present-day Politburo Standing Committee than the Secretariat.

== Composition ==
=== Members ===
==== 1st plenary session (1945–1950) ====
Members of the Secretariat of the 1st plenary session of the 7th Central Committee
| Rank | Officeholder | Hanzi | 6th PSC | 3rd PLE | Birth | PM | Death | Birthplace | No. of offices | Ref. |
|---|---|---|---|---|---|---|---|---|---|---|
| 1 | Mao Zedong | 毛泽东 | Old | Renewed | 1893 | 1921 | 1976 | Hunan | Five: Party office; Chairman, Central Committee; State office; Chairman, Central People's Government of the People's Republic of China (from 1949); Organisational office; Chairman, National Committee of the Chinese People's Political Consultative Conference (from 1949); Military offices; Chairman, Central Military Commission (before 1949); Chairman, People's Revolutionary Military Commission (from 1949) | |
| 2 | Zhu De | 朱德 | Old | Renewed | 1886 | 1925 | 1976 | Sichuan | Three: Party office; Secretary, Central Commission for Discipline Inspection (from 1949); Military offices; Commander-in-Chief, People's Liberation Army; Vice Chairman, People's Revolutionary Military Commission (from 1949) | |
| 3 | Liu Shaoqi | 刘少奇 | Old | Renewed | 1898 | 1921 | 1969 | Henan | Three: State office; Vice Chairman, Central People's Government of the People's Republic of China (from 1949); Military offices; Vice Chairman, Central Military Commission (before 1949); Vice Chairman, People's Revolutionary Military Commission (from 1949) | |
| 4 | Zhou Enlai | 周恩来 | Old | Renewed | 1898 | 1921 | 1976 | Jiangsu | Four: State offices; Premier, Government Administration Council of the Central People's Government (from 1949); Minister of Foreign Affairs, People's Republic of China (from 1949); Military offices; Vice Chairman, Central Military Commission (before 1949); Vice Chairman, People's Revolutionary Military Commission (from 1949) | |
| 5 | Ren Bishi | 任弼时 | Old | Died | 1904 | 1922 | 1950 | Hunan | One: Party office; Secretary-General, Central Committee Secretariat | |

==== 3rd plenary session (1950–1956) ====
Members of the Secretariat of the 3rd plenary session of the 7th Central Committee
| Rank | Officeholder | Hanzi | 1st PLE | 8th PSC | Birth | PM | Death | Birthplace | No. of offices | Ref. |
|---|---|---|---|---|---|---|---|---|---|---|
| 1 | Mao Zedong | 毛泽东 | Old | Reelected | 1893 | 1921 | 1976 | Hunan | Seven: Party office; Chairman, Central Committee; State offices; Chairman, Central People's Government of the People's Republic of China (before 1954); Chairman, People's Republic of China (from 1954); Organisational office; Chairman, National Committee of the Chinese People's Political Consultative Conference (before 1954); Military offices; Chairman, People's Revolutionary Military Commission (before 1954); Chairman, Central Military Commission of the Central Committee (from 1954); Chairman, National Defense Council (from 1954) | |
| 2 | Zhu De | 朱德 | Old | Reelected | 1886 | 1925 | 1976 | Sichuan | Five: Party office; Secretary, Central Commission for Discipline Inspection (before 1955); State office; Vice Chairman, People's Republic of China (from 1954); Military offices; Vice Chairman, People's Revolutionary Military Commission (before 1954); Commander-in-Chief, People's Liberation Army (before 1954); Vice Chairman, National Defense Council (from 1954) | |
| 3 | Liu Shaoqi | 刘少奇 | Old | Reelected | 1898 | 1921 | 1969 | Henan | Three: State office; Chairman, Standing Committee of the National People's Congress; Military offices; Vice Chairman, People's Revolutionary Military Commission (before 1954); Vice Chairman, National Defense Council (from 1954) | |
| 4 | Zhou Enlai | 周恩来 | Old | Reelected | 1898 | 1921 | 1976 | Jiangsu | Four: State offices; Minister of Foreign Affairs, People's Republic of China; Premier, Government Administration Council of the Central People's Government (before 1954); Premier, State Council of the People's Republic of China (from 1954); Organisational office; Chairman, National Committee of the Chinese People's Political Consultative Conference (from 1954) | |
| 5 | Chen Yun | 陈云 | Alternate | Reelected | 1905 | 1925 | 1995 | Shanghai | Two: State offices; Chairman, Central Commission for Economic and Financial Affairs (before 1954); First-ranked Vice Premier, State Council of the People's Republic of China (from 1954) | |

=== Alternates ===
==== 1st plenary session (1945–1950) ====
Members of the Secretariat of the 1st plenary session of the 7th Central Committee
| Rank | Officeholder | Hanzi | 6th PSC | 3rd PLE | Birth | PM | Death | Birthplace | No. of offices | Ref. |
|---|---|---|---|---|---|---|---|---|---|---|
| 1 | Chen Yun | 陈云 | Comeback | Promoted | 1905 | 1925 | 1995 | Shanghai | One: State office; Chairman, Central Commission for Economic and Financial Affairs (from 1949) | |
| 2 | Peng Zhen | 彭真 | New | Renewed | 1902 | 1923 | 1997 | Shanxi | One: Party office; Secretary, Beijing Municipal Committee (from 1948) | |

==== 3rd plenary session (1950–1956) ====
Members of the Secretariat of the 3rd plenary session of the 7th Central Committee
| Rank | Officeholder | Hanzi | 1st PLE | 8th PSC | Birth | PM | Death | Birthplace | No. of offices | Ref. |
|---|---|---|---|---|---|---|---|---|---|---|
| 1 | Peng Zhen | 彭真 | Old | Not | 1902 | 1923 | 1997 | Shanxi | Two: Party office; Secretary, Beijing Municipal Committee; State office; Mayor, Beijing Municipal People's Government (from 1951) | |
