= 10th Politburo Standing Committee of the Chinese Communist Party =

The 10th Politburo Standing Committee of the Chinese Communist Party, formally the Standing Committee of the Political Bureau of the 10th Central Committee of the Communist Party of China, was elected by the 1st plenary session of the 10th Central Committee in 1973, in the aftermath of the 10th National Congress of the Chinese Communist Party (CCP). It was preceded by the CCP's 9th Politburo Standing Committee and was succeeded by the 11th in 1977.

== Composition ==
=== 1st plenary session (1973–1975) ===
Members of the Politburo Standing Committee of the 1st plenary session of the 10th Central Committee
Rank	Officeholder	Hanzi	9th PSC	2nd PLE	Birth	PM	Death	Birthplace	No. of offices	Ref.
1	Mao Zedong	毛泽东	Old	Renewed	1893	1921	1976	Hunan	Two: Party office; Chairman, Central Committee; Military office; Chairman, Central Military Commission of the Central Committee	
2	Zhou Enlai	周恩来	Old	Renewed	1898	1921	1976	Jiangsu	Three: Party office; First Vice Chairman, Central Committee; State office; Premier, State Council of the People's Republic of China; Organisational office; Chairman, National Committee of the Chinese People's Political Consultative Conference	
3	Wang Hongwen	王洪文	New	Renewed	1935	1951	1992	Jilin	Two: Party office; Vice Chairman, Central Committee; Military office; Member, Standing Committee of the Central Military Commission of the Central Committee	
4	Kang Sheng	康生	Old	Renewed	1898	1925	1975	Shandong	Three: Party offices; Vice Chairman, Central Committee; Leader, Central Organization and Propaganda Leading Group; State office; Vice Chairman, Standing Committee of the National People's Congress	
5	Ye Jianying	叶剑英	New	Renewed	1897	1927	1986	Guangdong	Three: Party office; Vice Chairman, Central Committee; Military offices; Vice Chairman, Central Military Commission of the Central Committee; Vice Chairman, National Defense Council	
6	Li Desheng	李德生	New	Resigned	1916	1932	2011	Henan	Three: Party office; Vice Chairman, Central Committee; Military offices; Director, General Political Department of the People's Liberation Army; Commander, Shenyang Military Region of the People's Liberation Army	
7	Zhu De	朱德	Comeback	Renewed	1886	1925	1976	Sichuan	One: State office; Chairman, Standing Committee of the National People's Congress	
8	Zhang Chunqiao	张春桥	New	Renewed	1917	1938	2005	Shandong	Three: Party office; Secretary, Shanghai Municipal Committee; State offices; Vice Premier, State Council of the People's Republic of China; Chairman, Shanghai Municipal Revolutionary Committee	
9	Dong Biwu	董必武	New	Renewed	1886	1921	1975	Hubei	Two: State offices; Chairman, People's Republic of China (acting); Vice Chairman, People's Republic of China	

=== 2nd plenary session (1975–1977) ===
Members of the Politburo Standing Committee of the 2nd plenary session of the 10th Central Committee
Rank	Officeholder	Hanzi	1st PLE	3rd PLE	Birth	PM	Death	Birthplace	No. of offices	Ref.
1	Mao Zedong	毛泽东	Old	Died	1893	1921	1976	Hunan province	Two: Party office; Chairman, Central Committee (before 1976); Military office; Chairman, Central Military Commission of the Central Committee (before 1976)	
2	Hua Guofeng	华国锋	New	Renewed	1921	1938	2008	Shanxi	Seven: Party offices; Secretary, Hunan Provincial Committee (before April 1976); First Vice Chairman, Central Committee (April–October 1976); Chairman, Central Committee (from October 1976); State offices; Chairman, Shanghai Municipal Revolutionary Committee (before 1976); Minister of Public Security, People's Republic of China; Premier, State Council of the People's Republic of China (from 1976); Military office; Chairman, Central Military Commission of the Central Committee (from 1976)	
3	Zhou Enlai	周恩来	Old	Died	1898	1921	1976	Jiangsu	Three: Party office; First Vice Chairman, Central Committee (before 1976); State office; Premier, State Council of the People's Republic of China (before 1976); Organisational office; Chairman, National Committee of the Chinese People's Political Consultative Conference (before 1976)	
4	Wang Hongwen	王洪文	Old	Purged	1935	1951	1992	Jilin	Two: Party office; Vice Chairman, Central Committee (before 1976); Military office; Member, Standing Committee of the Central Military Commission (before 1976)	
5	Kang Sheng	康生	Old	Died	1898	1925	1975	Shandong	Three: Party offices; Vice Chairman, Central Committee (before 1975); Leader, Central Organization and Propaganda Leading Group (before 1975); State office; Vice Chairman, Standing Committee of the National People's Congress (before 1975)	
6	Ye Jianying	叶剑英	Old	Renewed	1897	1927	1986	Guangdong	Four: Party offices; Vice Chairman, Central Committee (before 1976); First Vice Chairman, Central Committee (from 1976); State office; Minister of National Defense, People's Republic of China; Military office; Vice Chairman, Central Military Commission of the Central Committee	
7	Zhu De	朱德	Old	Died	1886	1925	1976	Sichuan	One: State office; Chairman, Standing Committee of the National People's Congress	
8	Dong Biwu	董必武	Old	Died	1886	1921	1975	Hubei	One: State office; Vice Chairman, Standing Committee of the National People's Congress	
9	Zhang Chunqiao	张春桥	Old	Purged	1917	1938	2005	Shandong	Four: Party office; Secretary, Shanghai Municipal Committee (before 1976); State offices; Chairman, Shanghai Municipal Revolutionary Committee (before 1976); First-ranked Vice Premier, State Council of the People's Republic of China (from 1976); Military office; Director, General Political Department of the People's Liberation Army (before 1976)	
10	Deng Xiaoping	邓小平	Comeback	Removed	1904	1924	1997	Sichuan	Four: Party office; Vice Chairman, Central Committee (before 1976); State office; First-ranked Vice Premier, State Council of the People's Republic of China (before 1976); Military offices; Vice Chairman, Central Military Commission of the Central Committee (before 1976); Chief, General Staff Department of the Central Military Commission (before 1976)	

=== 3rd plenary session (July–August 1977) ===
Members of the Politburo Standing Committee of the 3rd plenary session of the 10th Central Committee
Rank	Officeholder	Hanzi	3rd PLE	12th PSC	Birth	PM	Death	Birthplace	No. of offices	Ref.
1	Hua Guofeng	华国锋	Old	Reelected	1921	1938	2008	Shanxi	Three: Party office; Chairman, Central Committee; State office; Premier, State Council of the People's Republic of China; Military office; Chairman, Central Military Commission of the Central Committee	
2	Ye Jianying	叶剑英	Old	Reelected	1897	1927	1986	Guangdong	Three: Party office; First Vice Chairman, Central Committee; State office; Minister of National Defense, People's Republic of China; Military office; Vice Chairman, Central Military Commission of the Central Committee	
3	Deng Xiaoping	邓小平	Comeback	Reelected	1904	1924	1997	Sichuan	Four: Party office; Vice Chairman, Central Committee; State office; First-ranked Vice Premier, State Council of the People's Republic of China; Military offices; Vice Chairman, Central Military Commission of the Central Committee; Chief, General Staff Department of the Central Military Commission	
