= Beijing Government =

Beijing Government may refer to:

- Beijing Municipal People's Government, the city government of Beijing
  - Politics of Beijing, a dual party-government system ruling the city of Beijing
- People's Republic of China, a sovereign state with its seat of government in Beijing
- State Council of the People's Republic of China, the national government of China

== In history ==
- Beiyang Government, a series of military regimes that ruled from Beijing from 1912 to 1928

== See also ==
- Beijing Coup, a 1924 coup d'état in China
- State Council of the People's Republic of China, chief administrative authority of the PRC
- Taipei Government
