= Beijing Municipal People's Congress =

Elected council of Beijing

Beijing Municipal People's Congress 北京市人民代表大会
- 16th Beijing Municipal People's Congress

Type
- Type: Province-level people's congress

Leadership
- Chairman: Li Xiuling, CCP since 19 January 2023
- Vice Chairpersons: Qi Jing; Zhang Jiandong; Pang Lijuan; Yan Aoshuang; Hou Junshu; Yu Jun
- Seats: 774

Elections
- Beijing Municipal People's Congress voting system: Plurality-at-large voting & Two-round system
- Last Beijing Municipal People's Congress election: January 2023
- Next Beijing Municipal People's Congress election: January 2028

Meeting place
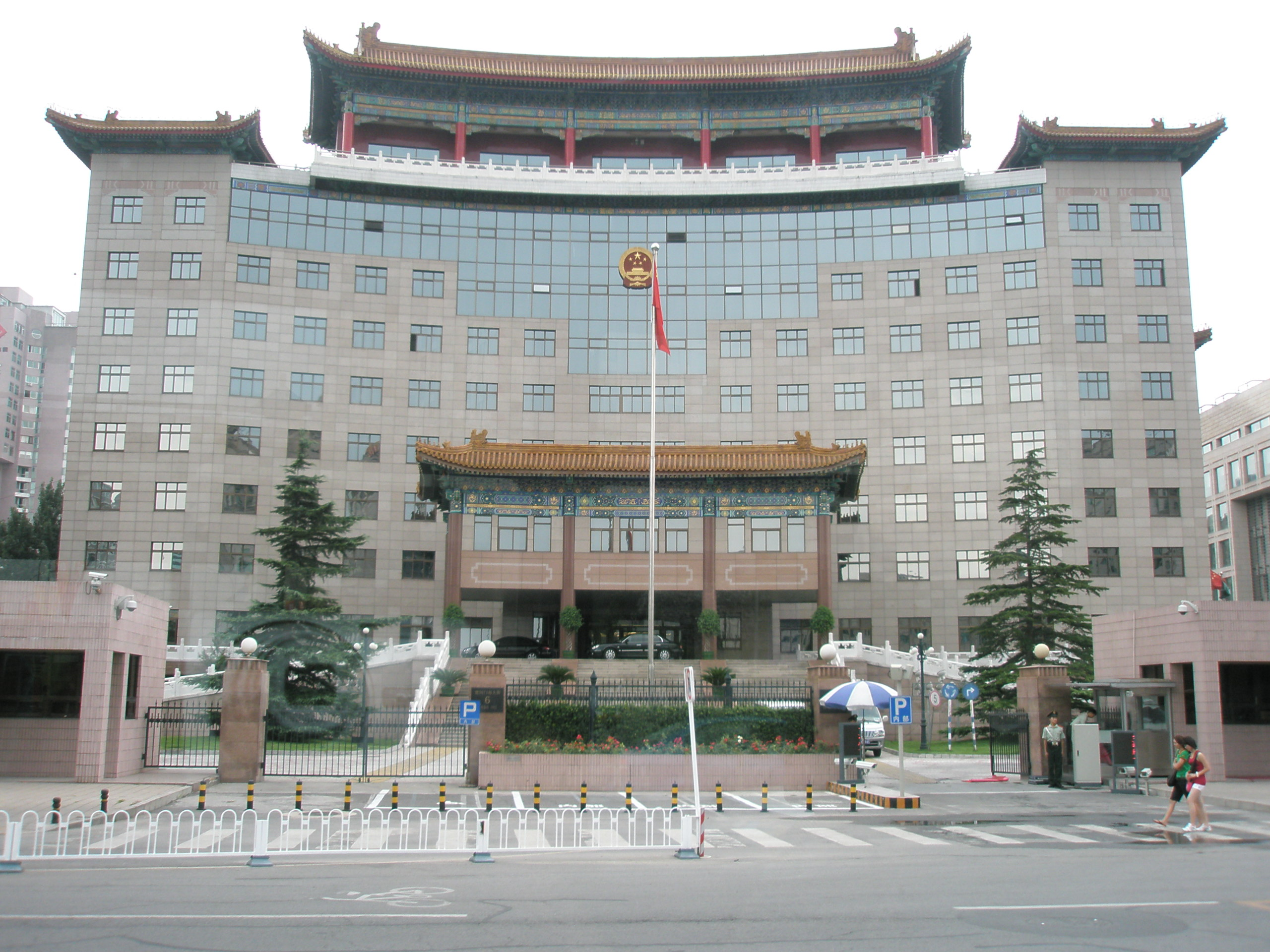
- Headquarters

Website
- www.bjrd.gov.cn

Beijing Municipality People's Congress
- Simplified Chinese: 北京市人民代表大会
- Traditional Chinese: 北京市人民代表大會
Transcriptions
Standard Mandarin
- Hanyu Pinyin: Běijīng Shì Rénmín Dàibiǎo Dàhuì

The Beijing Municipal People's Congress is the local people's congress of Beijing. With 774 members in 2023, the Municipal People's Congress is the elected council of Beijing that oversees the Beijing Municipal People's Government. The Beijing Municipal People's Congress is elected for a term of five years. It holds annual sessions every spring, usually lasting from 5 to 7 days. Between these annual sessions, the functions of the Municipal People's Congress are handled by its permanent body, the Standing Committee.

== Organization ==
=== Standing Committee ===
- General Office
- Legal Affairs Office
- Office of Internal Justice
- Office of Finance and Economics
- Office of Education, Science, Culture, Health and Sports
- Urban Construction and Environmental Protection Office
- Rural Office
- Ethnic, Religious and Overseas Chinese Affairs Office
- Research Room
- Representative Liaison Office
- Personnel Office
- Party Committee

=== Chairpersons of the Standing Committee ===
No.	Name	Term start	Term end	Ref.
1	Jia Tingsan (贾庭三)	1979	1983	
2	Zhao Pengfei (赵鹏飞)	1983	1993	
3	Zhang Jianmin (张健民)	1993	2001	
4	Yu Junbo (于均波)	2001	2007	
5	Du Deyin (杜德印)	January 2007	January 2017	
6	Li Wei (李伟)	20 January 2017	19 January 2023	
6	Li Xiuling (李秀领)	19 January 2023	Incumbent	

== See also ==
- System of people's congress
