= Longxu Ditch =

Drainage river in Beijing, China

Longxu Ditch (龙须沟), formerly known as Jiaotan Houhe (郊坛后河), is a man-made drainage river in the south of Beijing, built in the Yongle period of the Ming Dynasty.

After the Qing dynasty, Longxu Ditch gradually reduced to a sewer, with the nearby community becoming a slum. In 1950 the Beijing Municipal Sanitation Engineering Bureau cut off its source and the surface of the river completely disappeared. Lao He created the drama "Longxu Ditch" for the renovation of Longxu Ditch in 1950.

== Hydrology ==
Longxu Ditch originates from the southwest Hufang Bridge outside Qianmen, southeast through Yongan Bridge, overpass, east through Jinyu Pond, Zhuangyuan Bridge, Red Bridge, southeast after the Temple of Heaven, into the moat on the west side of Zuoan Gate, a total length of about 8 kilometers.

== History ==
Longxu Ditch was first seen in the Ming Xuande period historical materials, it is said that the Ming Chengzu was built for the Temple of Heaven in Beijing, the temple of mountains and rivers was built, because it is located in the north wall of the suburb altar because of the name of the suburb altar after the river.

In the Qing dynasty, it was called Longxigou. Until the early years of Guangxu in the Qing dynasty, Longxu Valley remained clear and sparsely inhabited. With the Grand Canal cut off after the Yellow River was diverted, the upstream water source dried up, and the river channel of Longxu Valley became increasingly silted up. As poor people moved in, Longxu Valley was low-lying and polluted with sewage, rainwater and garbage from nearby residents.

In 1950, the Beijing Municipal People's Congress voted to spend 2.25% of the annual budget to renovate Longxu Ditch, which became the first municipal project carried out after the founding of the Chinese Communist Party. In the same year, under the auspices of the Beijing Municipal Health Engineering Bureau, the project began on May 16, involving the military, local residents, and through the "work relief" to recruit some city workers and rural farmers, and completed on November 12. The total amount of the project is 199 meters of dredged open ditch, the remaining fill or build underground drainage pipes, and build roads on the surface.
