= Zhao Pengfei =

Chinese politician

Zhao Pengfei 赵鹏飞

Chairman of the Beijing Municipal People's Congress
- In office 1983–1993
- Preceded by: Jia Tingsan
- Succeeded by: Zhang Jianmin

Personal details
- Born: February 1, 1920 Yi County, Hebei, Qing Dynasty
- Died: January 31, 2005 (aged 84) Beijing, People's Republic of China
- Party: Chinese Communist Party
- Spouse: Cui Yueying

Zhao Pengfei (Chinese: 赵鹏飞; February 1, 1920 – January 31, 2005) was a member of the Chinese Communist Party. He served as Chairman of the Beijing People's Congress from 1983 to 1993 and Vice Chairman of the Beijing Chinese People's Political Consultative Conference (CPPCC) from 1979 to 1983.

== Biography ==
Zhao was Manchu by descent. He was born in Yi County, Hebei province. He joined the Communist party in March 1939.
