= Longest-serving members of the Politburo Standing Committee of the Chinese Communist Party =

This is a list of members of the Politburo Standing Committee of the Chinese Communist Party who have served 11 years or more. One table ranks them according to continuous service, and another table ranks members according to total years as members. Zhou Enlai served the longest, but Mao Zedong had the continuously longest service of any member.

== Longest-serving members ==
Longest-serving members of the Politburo Standing Committee
No.	Officeholder	Hanzi	Took office	Left office	Duration		Ref.
No.	Officeholder	Hanzi	Took office	Left office	Days	Years & days	Ref.
1	Zhou Enlai	周恩来	21 May 1944; 10 November 1927; 4 July 1927	8 January 1976; 9 December 1937; 9 August 1927	15,272	41 years, 317 days	
2	Mao Zedong	毛泽东	17 January 1935	9 September 1976	15,211	41 years, 236 days	
3	Chen Yun	陈云	18 August 1977; 9 June 1950; 9 December 1937	2 November 1987; 28 April 1969; 20 March 1943	12,553	34 years, 124 days	
4	Zhu De	朱德	30 August 1973; 21 May 1944	6 July 1976; 28 April 1969	10,149	27 years, 288 days	
5	Liu Shaoqi	刘少奇	20 March 1943	31 October 1968	9,357	25 years, 225 days	
6	Deng Xiaoping	邓小平	21 July 1976; 10 January 1975; 28 September 1956	2 November 1987; 7 April 1976; 31 October 1968	8,990	24 years, 209 days	
7	Hu Jintao	胡锦涛	19 October 1992	15 November 2012	7,332	20 years, 27 days	
8	Xi Jinping	习近平	22 October 2007	Incumbent	6,873	18 years, 298 days	
9	Li Peng	李鹏	2 November 1987	22 November 2002	5,499	15 years, 20 days	
10	Li Keqiang	李克强	22 October 2007	23 October 2022	5,480	15 years, 1 day	
11	Kang Sheng	康生	12 August 1966; 9 December 1937	16 December 1975; 20 March 1943	5,340	14 years, 227 days	
12	Jiang Zemin	江泽民	24 June 1989	22 November 2002	4,899	13 years, 151 days	
12	Li Ruihuan	李瑞环	24 June 1989	22 November 2002	4,899	13 years, 151 days	
13	Lin Biao	林彪	25 May 1958	13 September 1971	4,859	13 years, 108 days	

== Longest continuously serving members ==
Longest continuously serving members of the Politburo Standing Committee
No.	Officeholder	Hanzi	Took office	Left office	Duration		Ref.
No.	Officeholder	Hanzi	Took office	Left office	Days	Years & days	Ref.
1	Mao Zedong	毛泽东	17 January 1935	9 September 1976	15,211	41 years, 236 days	
2	Zhou Enlai	周恩来	21 May 1944	8 January 1976	11,554	31 years, 232 days	
3	Liu Shaoqi	刘少奇	20 March 1943	31 October 1968	9,357	25 years, 225 days	
4	Zhu De	朱德	21 May 1944	28 April 1969	9,108	24 years, 342 days	
5	Hu Jintao	胡锦涛	19 October 1992	15 November 2012	7,332	20 years, 27 days	
6	Chen Yun	陈云	9 June 1950	28 April 1969	6,898	18 years, 323 days	
7	Xi Jinping	习近平	22 October 2007	Incumbent	6,873	18 years, 298 days	
8	Li Peng	李鹏	2 November 1987	22 November 2002	5,499	15 years, 20 days	
9	Li Keqiang	李克强	22 October 2007	23 October 2022	5,480	15 years, 1 day	
10	Jiang Zemin	江泽民	24 June 1989	22 November 2002	4,899	13 years, 151 days	
10	Li Ruihuan	李瑞环	24 June 1989	22 November 2002	4,899	13 years, 151 days	
11	Lin Biao	林彪	25 May 1958	13 September 1971	4,859	13 years, 108 days	
12	Deng Xiaoping	邓小平	28 September 1956	31 October 1968	4,416	12 years, 33 days	

== See also ==
- Leader of the Chinese Communist Party
- Orders of precedence in China
- Provincial party standing committee
