= 8th Politburo Standing Committee of the Chinese Communist Party =

The 8th Politburo Standing Committee of the Chinese Communist Party, formally the Standing Committee of the Political Bureau of the 8th Central Committee of the Communist Party of China, was elected by the 1st plenary session of the 8th Central Committee in 1956, in the aftermath of the 8th National Congress of the Chinese Communist Party (CCP). It was preceded by the CCP's 7th Politburo Standing Committee and was succeeded by the 9th in 1969.

== Composition ==
=== 1st plenary session (1956–1958) ===
Members of the Politburo Standing Committee of the 1st plenary session of the 8th Central Committee
Rank	Officeholder	Hanzi	7th SEC	2nd PLE	Birth	PM	Death	Birthplace	No. of offices	Ref.
1	Mao Zedong	毛泽东	Old	Renewed	1893	1921	1976	Hunan	Four: Party office; Chairman, Central Committee; State office; Chairman, People's Republic of China; Military offices; Chairman, Central Military Commission of the Central Committee; Chairman, National Defense Council	
2	Liu Shaoqi	刘少奇	Old	Renewed	1898	1921	1969	Henan	Two: Party office; First Vice Chairman, Central Committee; State office; Chairman, Standing Committee of the National People's Congress	
3	Zhou Enlai	周恩来	Old	Renewed	1898	1921	1976	Jiangsu	Four: Party office; Vice Chairman, Central Committee; State offices; Premier, State Council of the People's Republic of China; Minister of Foreign Affairs, People's Republic of China; Organisational office; Chairman, National Committee of the Chinese People's Political Consultative Conference	
4	Zhu De	朱德	Old	Renewed	1886	1925	1976	Sichuan	Three: Party office; Vice Chairman, Central Committee; State office; Vice Chairman, People's Republic of China; Military office; Vice Chairman, National Defense Council	
5	Chen Yun	陈云	Old	Renewed	1905	1925	1995	Shanghai	Two: Party office; Vice Chairman, Central Committee; State office; First-ranked Vice Premier, State Council of the People's Republic of China	
6	Deng Xiaoping	邓小平	New	Renewed	1904	1924	1997	Sichuan	Two: Party office; Secretary-General, Central Committee Secretariat; State office; Vice Premier, State Council of the People's Republic of China	

=== 5th plenary session (1958–1966) ===
Members of the Politburo Standing Committee of the 5th plenary session of the 8th Central Committee
Rank	Officeholder	Hanzi	1st PLE	11th PLE	Birth	PM	Death	Birthplace	No. of offices	Ref.
1	Mao Zedong	毛泽东	Old	Renewed	1893	1921	1976	Hunan	Four: Party office; Chairman, Central Committee; State office; Chairman, People's Republic of China (before 1959); Military offices; Chairman, Central Military Commission of the Central Committee; Chairman, National Defense Council (before 1959)	
2	Liu Shaoqi	刘少奇	Old	Renewed	1898	1921	1969	Henan	Four: Party office; First Vice Chairman, Central Committee; State offices; Chairman, Standing Committee of the National People's Congress (before 1959); Chairman, People's Republic of China (from 1959); Military office; Chairman, National Defense Council (from 1959)	
3	Zhou Enlai	周恩来	Old	Renewed	1898	1921	1976	Jiangsu	Three: Party office; Vice Chairman, Central Committee; State office; Premier, State Council of the People's Republic of China; Organisational office; Chairman, National Committee of the Chinese People's Political Consultative Conference	
4	Zhu De	朱德	Old	Renewed	1886	1925	1976	Sichuan	Four: Party office; Vice Chairman, Central Committee; State offices; Vice Chairman, People's Republic of China (before 1959); Chairman, Standing Committee of the National People's Congress (from 1959); Military office; Vice Chairman, National Defense Council (before 1959)	
5	Chen Yun	陈云	Old	Renewed	1905	1925	1995	Shanghai	Three: Party office; Vice Chairman, Central Committee; State offices; First-ranked Vice Premier, State Council of the People's Republic of China (before 1964); Vice Premier, State Council of the People's Republic of China (from 1964)	
6	Lin Biao	林彪	New	Renewed	1907	1925	1971	Hubei	Six: Party office; Vice Chairman, Central Committee; State offices; Vice Premier, State Council of the People's Republic of China (before 1964); First-ranked Vice Premier, State Council of the People's Republic of China (from 1964); Minister of National Defense, People's Republic of China (from 1959); Military offices; Vice Chairman, National Defense Council; Vice Chairman, Central Military Commission of the Central Committee (from 1959)	
7	Deng Xiaoping	邓小平	Old	Renewed	1904	1924	1997	Sichuan	Two: Party office; Secretary-General, Central Committee Secretariat; State office; Vice Premier, State Council of the People's Republic of China	

=== 11th plenary session (1966–1968) ===
Members of the Politburo Standing Committee of the 11th plenary session of the 8th Central Committee
Rank	Officeholder	Hanzi	5th PLE	12th PLE	Birth	PM	Death	Birthplace	No. of offices	Ref.
1	Mao Zedong	毛泽东	Old	Renewed	1893	1921	1976	Hunan	Two: Party office; Chairman, Central Committee; Military office; Chairman, Central Military Commission of the Central Committee	
2	Lin Biao	林彪	Old	Renewed	1907	1925	1971	Hubei	Five: Party office; First Vice Chairman, Central Committee; State offices; First-ranked Vice Premier, State Council of the People's Republic of China; Minister of National Defense, People's Republic of China; Military offices; Vice Chairman, Central Military Commission of the Central Committee; Vice Chairman, National Defense Council	
3	Zhou Enlai	周恩来	Old	Renewed	1898	1921	1976	Jiangsu	Two: State office; Premier, State Council of the People's Republic of China; Organisational office; Chairman, National Committee of the Chinese People's Political Consultative Conference	
4	Tao Zhu	陶铸	New	Not	1908	1926	1969	Hunan	Three: Party offices; Standing Secretary, Central Committee Secretariat; Head, Propaganda Department of the Central Committee (before 1967); State office; Vice Premier, State Council of the People's Republic of China	
5	Chen Boda	陈伯达	New	Renewed	1904	1927	1989	Fujian	One: Party office; Chairman, Central Cultural Revolution Group	
6	Deng Xiaoping	邓小平	Old	Not	1904	1924	1997	Sichuan	One: State office; Vice Premier, State Council of the People's Republic of China	
7	Kang Sheng	康生	New	Renewed	1898	1925	1975	Shandong	One: State office; Vice Chairman, Standing Committee of the National People's Congress	
8	Liu Shaoqi	刘少奇	Old	Not	1898	1921	1969	Henan	Two: State office; Chairman, People's Republic of China; Military office; Chairman, National Defense Council	
9	Zhu De	朱德	Old	Renewed	1886	1925	1976	Sichuan	One: State office; Chairman, Standing Committee of the National People's Congress	
10	Li Fuchun	李富春	New	Renewed	1900	1922	1975	Hunan	One: State office; Vice Premier, State Council of the People's Republic of China	
11	Chen Yun	陈云	Old	Renewed	1905	1925	1995	Shanghai	One: State office; Vice Premier, State Council of the People's Republic of China	

=== 12th plenary session (1968–1969) ===
Members of the Politburo Standing Committee of the 12th plenary session of the 8th Central Committee
Rank	Officeholder	Hanzi	11th PLE	9th PSC	Birth	PM	Death	Birthplace	No. of offices	Ref.
1	Mao Zedong	毛泽东	Old	Reelected	1893	1921	1976	Hunan	Two: Party office; Chairman, Central Committee; Military office; Chairman, Central Military Commission	
2	Lin Biao	林彪	Old	Reelected	1907	1925	1971	Hubei	Five: Party office; First Vice Chairman, Central Committee; State offices; First-ranked Vice Premier, State Council of the People's Republic of China; Minister of National Defense, People's Republic of China; Military offices; Vice Chairman, Central Military Commission; Vice Chairman, National Defense Council	
3	Zhou Enlai	周恩来	Old	Reelected	1898	1921	1976	Jiangsu	Two: State office; Premier, State Council of the People's Republic of China; Organisational office; Chairman, National Committee of the Chinese People's Political Consultative Conference	
4	Chen Boda	陈伯达	Old	Reelected	1904	1927	1989	Fujian	One: Party office; Chairman, Central Cultural Revolution Group	
5	Kang Sheng	康生	Old	Reelected	1898	1925	1975	Shandong	One: State office; Vice Chairman, Standing Committee of the National People's Congress	
6	Zhu De	朱德	Old	Not	1886	1925	1976	Sichuan	One: State office; Chairman, Standing Committee of the National People's Congress	
7	Li Fuchun	李富春	Old	Not	1900	1922	1975	Hunan	One: State office; Vice Premier, State Council of the People's Republic of China	
8	Chen Yun	陈云	Old	Not	1905	1925	1995	Shanghai	One: State office; Vice Premier, State Council of the People's Republic of China	
