= List of current district-level leaders of Beijing =

This is a list of current district-level leaders of Beijing, including Communist Party Committee Secretaries (labelled Party Secretary) and government leaders.

== Party Secretaries ==
| Districts | Incumbent | Birthdate | Ancestry | Previous office | Took office |
|---|---|---|---|---|---|
| Dongcheng | Zhang Jiaming 张家明 | December 1963 (age 62) | Feidong County, Anhui | Deputy Party Secretary of Dongcheng District; Governor of Dongcheng District | 2015.11 |
| Xicheng | Lu Yingchuan 卢映川 | May 1968 (age 58) | Funan County, Anhui | Deputy Party Secretary of Shunyi District; Governor of Shunyi District | 2015.12 |
| Chaoyang | Wu Guiying 吴桂英 | February 1966 (age 60) | Tangshan, Hebei | Deputy Party Secretary of Chaoyang District; Governor of Chaoyang District | 2015.09 |
| Haidian | Yu Jun 于军 | June 1964 (age 62) | Pingdu, Shandong | Deputy Party Secretary of Haidian District; Governor of Haidian District | 2017.07.24 |
| Fengtai | Wang Xianyong 汪先永 | July 1967 (age 59) | Taihu County, Anhui | Party Secretary of Miyun District | 2017.03 |
| Shijingshan | Niu Qingshan 牛青山 | December 1960 (age 65) | Dingzhou, Hebei | Deputy Party Secretary of Dongcheng District; Governor of Dongcheng District | 2013.11 |
| Mentougou | Zhang Guilin 张贵林 | April 1963 (age 63) | Xing'an County, Guangxi | Deputy Party Secretary of Mentougou District; Governor of Mendougou District | 2016.03 |
| Fangshan | Zeng Zanrong 曾赞荣 | August 1969 (age 57) | Shaodong County, Hunan | Deputy Party Secretary of Fangshan District; Governor of Fangshan District | 2016.02 |
| Tongzhou | Yang Bin 杨斌 | December 1961 (age 64) | Changyi, Shandong | Head of Beijing Municipal Housing and Urban-Rural Development Commission | 2014.11 |
| Shunyi | Wang Gang 王刚 | July 1968 (age 58) | Huludao, Liaoning | Deputy Party Secretary of Shunyi District; Governor of Shunyi District | 2013.02 |
| Changping | Hou Junshu 侯君舒 | June 1963 (age 63) | Ningling County, Henan | Deputy Party Secretary of Haidian District | 2010.04 |
| Daxing | Zhou Liyun 周立云 | February 1963 (age 63) | Yuanjiang, Hunan | Deputy Secretary General of Beijing Municipal Party Committee; Director of the Research Office of Beijing Municipal Party Committee | 2017.06 |
| Huairou | Chang Wei 常卫 | September 1966 (age 59–60) | Yanshi, Henan | Deputy Party Secretary of Huairou District; Governor of Huairou District | 2017.07.24 |
| Pinggu | Wang Chengguo 王成国 | February 1966 (age 60) | Laiwu, Shandong | Deputy Secretary General of Beijing Municipal Party Committee | 2015.09 |
| Miyun | Xia Linmao 夏林茂 | May 1970 (age 56) | Jianhu County, Jiangsu | Deputy Party Secretary of Shijingshan District; Governor of Shijingshan District | 2017.05 |
| Yanqing | Li Zhijun 李志军 | October 1969 (age 56) | Linzhou, Henan | Deputy Secretary General of Beijing Municipal Party Committee | 2012.04 |

== Governors ==
| Districts | Incumbent | Birthdate | Ancestry | Previous office | Took office |
|---|---|---|---|---|---|
| Dongcheng | Li Xianzhong 李先忠 | June 1971 (age 55) | Longkou, Shandong | Deputy Party Secretary of Yanqing County; Governor of Yanqing County | 2015.11 |
| Xicheng | Wang Shaofeng 王少峰 | November 1970 (age 55) | Rizhao, Shandong | Communist Youth League Secretary of Beijing | 2011.07 |
| Chaoyang District | Wang Hao 王灏 | June 1967 (age 59) | Haicheng, Liaoning | Board Chairman & General Manager of the Beijing Capital Group | 2015.11 |
| Haidian | Dai Binbin 戴彬彬 | January 1968 (age 58) | Kunshan, Jiangsu | Board Chairman of the Beijing Construction Engineering Group | 2017.09 |
| Fengtai | Ji Yan 冀岩 | October 1962 (age 63) | Beijing | Deputy Head of Beijing Municipal Construction Commission | 2011.08 |
| Shijingshan | Wen Xian 文献 | April 1969 (age 57) | Pingxiang, Jiangxi | Member of the Party Standing Committee of Shijingshan District; Vice Governor of Shijingshan District | 2017.05 |
| Mentougou | Fu Zhaogeng 付兆庚 | August 1964 (age 62) | Beijing | Deputy Party Secretary of Mentougou District; Head of the Political and Legal Affairs Commission of Mentougou District | 2016.04 |
| Fangshan | Chen Qing 陈清 | January 1966 (age 60) | Jilin City, Jilin | Deputy Head of Beijing Municipal Administration of Work Safety | 2016.04 |
| Tongzhou | Zhang Libing 张力兵 | August 1963 (age 63) | Beijing | Director of the Office of the Leading Group of Supporting and Economical Cooperation of Beijing | 2016.10 |
| Shunyi | Gao Peng 高朋 | July 1972 (age 54) | Fengcheng, Liaoning | Head of Beijing Municipal Development and Reform Commission | 2015.12 |
| Changping | Zhang Yanyou 张燕友 | July 1963 (age 63) | Beijing | Member of the Party Standing Committee of Changping District; Vice Governor of Changping District | 2013.04 |
| Daxing | Cui Zhicheng 崔志成 | April 1970 (age 56) | Zhaoyuan, Shandong | Member of the Party Standing Committee of Daxing District; Executive Vice Governor of Daxing District | 2016.04 |
| Huairou | Lu Yuguo 卢宇国 | December 1970 (age 55) | Huangchuan County, Henan | Commander of the Supporting Officials from Beijing to Tibet | 2017.09 |
| Pinggu | Wang Minghao 汪明浩 | October 1967 (age 58) | Liaoyang, Liaoning | Director of the Taiwan Affairs Office of Beijing | 2016.08 |
| Miyun | Pan Linzhu 潘临珠 | September 1962 (age 63–64) | Linfen, Shanxi | Deputy Party Secretary of Miyun County; Head of the Political and Legal Affairs Commission of Miyun County | 2015.11 |
| Yanqing | Mu Peng 穆鹏 | May 1966 (age 60) | Liquan County, Shanxi | Member of the Party Standing Committee of Haidian District; Vice Governor of Haidian District | 2015.12 |
