= Du Deyin =

Chinese politician

- Born: July 1951 (age 74); Beijing, China
- Occupation: politician

Du Deyin (Chinese: 杜德印; pinyin: Dù Déyìn; born July 1951, in Beijing) is a politician of the People's Republic of China.

He joined the Chinese Communist Party (CCP) in 1974.

He was the Secretary of the CCP Yanqing County Committee and became the Chairman of the Beijing Municipal People's Congress Standing Committee in 2007.

Du was an alternate member of the 16th CCP Central Committee.

Political offices
Preceded by Yu Junbo	Chairman of Beijing Municipal People's Congress Standing Committee; 2007–2017	Succeeded by Li Wei
