= Pang Lijuan =

Chinese educator and politician from China

- 庞丽娟

Member of the Standing Committee of the National People's Congress
- Incumbent
- Assumed office 2003

Personal details
- Born: August 1962 (age 63) Ninghai County, Zhejiang, China.
- Party: China Association for Promoting Democracy
- Education: Beijing Normal University (BA Ph.D); University of Illinois at Urbana–Champaign (M.Phil)

Pang Lijuan (Chinese: 庞丽娟; born August 1962) is a Chinese educator and politician who is a member of the Standing Committee of the National People's Congress and a member of the Chinese Communist Party. She has also worked at Beijing Normal University, University of California, Berkeley, and Stanford University.

== Early life ==
Pang was born in 1962, in Ninghai County, Zhejiang, China. Lijuan graduated with a Bachelor of Arts in childhood education in 1982, a master of philosophy from the University of Illinois at Urbana–Champaign in 1987 and a doctorate in psychology in 1991, from the Beijing Normal University.

== Career ==
Pang has worked at Beijing Normal University, University of California, Berkeley, and Stanford University. At Beijing Normal University she worked as Vice Director of the University Council, and as a professor. She worked at the Senior Behavior Scientific Research Center at Stanford University and at the Institute of Human Development at the University of California, Berkeley.

Since 2003, Pang served as a member of the Standing Committee of the National People's Congress and during her tenure she served on the Education, Science, Culture and Health committee.
