= Li Wei (politician, born 1958) =

Chinese politician

- 李伟

Chairman of the Standing Committee of the Beijing Municipal People's Congress
- In office January 2017 – January 2023
- Preceded by: Duan Qiyang
- Succeeded by: Yin Li

Personal details
- Born: January 1958 (age 68) Zhangjiagang, Jiangsu, China
- Party: Chinese Communist Party
- Education: Nanjing University

Li Wei (Chinese: 李伟; born January 1958), a native of Zhangjiagang, Jiangsu, is a Chinese politician and the who was the chairman of the Standing Committee of the Beijing Municipal People's Congress from 2017 to 2023.

== Biography ==
Li entered the workforce in June 1975 and joined the Chinese Communist Party (CCP) in July 1977. Li graduated from Nanjing University with an undergraduate major in Chinese language and a master's degree in law.

In May 2013, Li was appointed as a standing member of the CCP Beijing Municipal Committee, as well as head of the Committee's Publicity Department. In January 2017, he was transferred to serve as chairman of the Standing Committee of the Beijing Municipal People's Congress. In January 2018, Li was elected as a Beijing delegate to the 13th National People's Congress. On January 7, 2023, he relinquished his role as Director of the Standing Committee of the Beijing Municipal People's Congress.

Political offices
Preceded by Du Deyin	Chairman of Beijing Municipal People's Congress Standing Committee; 2017–2023	Succeeded by Li Xiuling
