= 6th Politburo Standing Committee of the Chinese Communist Party =

The 6th Politburo Standing Committee of the Chinese Communist Party, formally the Standing Committee of the Political Bureau of the 6th Central Committee of the Communist Party of China, was elected by the 1st plenary session of the 6th Central Committee in 1928, in the aftermath of the 6th National Congress of the Chinese Communist Party (CCP). It was preceded by the 5th Politburo Standing Committee and succeeded by the 7th Secretariat in 1945.

== Composition ==
=== 1st plenary session (1928–1930) ===
Members of the Politburo Standing Committee of the 1st plenary session of the 6th Central Committee
Rank	Officeholder	Hanzi	5th PSC	3rd PLE	Birth	PM	Death	Birthplace	Ref.
1	Xiang Zhongfa	向忠发	New	Renewed	1879	1921	1931	Shanghai	
2	Zhou Enlai	周恩来	Old	Renewed	1898	1921	1976	Jiangsu	
3	Su Zhaozheng	苏兆征	Old	Died	1885	1925	1929	Guangdong	
4	Xiang Ying	项英	New	Not	1895	1922	1941	Anhui	
5	Cai Hesen	蔡和森	Comeback	War	1895	1921	1931	Shanghai	
6	Li Lisan	李立三	Comeback	Not	1899	1921	1967	Hunan	

=== 3rd plenary session (1930–1931) ===
Members of the Politburo Standing Committee of the 3rd plenary session of the 6th Central Committee
Rank	Officeholder	Hanzi	1st PLE	4th PLE	Birth	PM	Death	Birthplace	Ref.
1	Xiang Zhongfa	向忠发	Old	Renewed	1879	1921	1931	Shanghai	
2	Zhou Enlai	周恩来	Old	Renewed	1898	1921	1976	Jiangsu	
3	Qu Qiubai	瞿秋白	Comeback	Not	1899	1921	1935	Fujian	

=== 4th plenary session (January–June 1931) ===
Members of the Politburo Standing Committee of the 4th plenary session of the 6th Central Committee
Rank	Officeholder	Hanzi	3rd PLE	5th PLE	Birth	PM	Death	Birthplace	Ref.
1	Xiang Zhongfa	向忠发	Old	War	1879	1921	1931	Shanghai	
2	Zhou Enlai	周恩来	Old	Renewed	1898	1921	1976	Jiangsu	
3	Zhang Guotao	张国焘	Comeback	Not	1897	1921	1979	Sichuan	
4	Wang Ming	王明	New	Not	1904	1924	1974	Anhui	

=== 5th plenary session (1934–1935) ===
Members of the Politburo Standing Committee of the 5th plenary session of the 6th Central Committee
Rank	Officeholder	Hanzi	4th PLE	6th PLE	Birth	PM	Death	Birthplace	Ref.
1	Bo Gu	博古	New	Renewed	1898	1921	1969	Jiangsu	
2	Zhang Wentian	张闻天	New	Renewed	1900	1925	1976	Shanghai	
3	Zhou Enlai	周恩来	Old	Renewed	1900	1925	1976	Jiangsu	
4	Xiang Ying	项英	Comeback	Not	1895	1922	1941	Anhui	

=== Zunyi Conference (1935–1937) ===
Members of the Politburo Standing Committee of the Zunyi Conference of the 6th Central Committee
Rank	Officeholder	Hanzi	5th PLE	POL	Birth	PM	Death	Birthplace	Ref.
1	Zhang Wentian	张闻天	Old	Renewed	1900	1925	1976	Shanghai	
2	Mao Zedong	毛泽东	New	Renewed	1893	1921	1976	Hunan	
3	Zhou Enlai	周恩来	Old	Not	1900	1925	1976	Jiangsu	
4	Bo Gu	博古	Old	Not	1898	1921	1969	Jiangsu	
5	Wang Jiaxiang	王稼祥	New	Not	1906	1928	1974	Anhui	

=== Politburo meeting (1937–1938) ===
Members of the Politburo Standing Committee of the December 1937 Politburo meeting of the 6th Central Committee
Rank	Officeholder	Hanzi	ZUN	6th PLE	Birth	PM	Death	Birthplace	Ref.
1	Mao Zedong	毛泽东	Old	Renewed	1893	1921	1976	Hunan	
2	Wang Ming	王明	Comeback	Renewed	1904	1924	1974	Anhui	
3	Zhang Wentian	张闻天	Old	Renewed	1900	1925	1976	Shanghai	
4	Chen Yun	陈云	New	Renewed	1905	1925	1995	Shanghai	
5	Kang Sheng	康生	New	Renewed	1898	1925	1975	Shandong	

=== 6th plenary session (1938–1943) ===
Members of the Politburo Standing Committee of the 6th plenary session of the 6th Central Committee
Rank	Officeholder	Hanzi	POL	POL	Birth	PM	Death	Birthplace	Ref.
1	Mao Zedong	毛泽东	Old	Renewed	1893	1921	1976	Hunan	
2	Zhang Wentian	张闻天	Old	Not	1900	1925	1976	Shanghai	
3	Chen Yun	陈云	Old	Not	1905	1925	1995	Shanghai	
4	Kang Sheng	康生	Old	Not	1898	1925	1975	Shandong	
5	Wang Ming	王明	Old	Not	1904	1924	1974	Anhui	
6	Ren Bishi	任弼时	New	Renewed	1904	1922	1950	Hunan	

=== Politburo meeting (1943–1944) ===
Members of the Politburo Standing Committee of the March 1943 Politburo meeting of the 6th Central Committee
Rank	Officeholder	Hanzi	6th PLE	7th PLE	Birth	PM	Death	Birthplace	Ref.
1	Mao Zedong	毛泽东	Old	Renewed	1893	1921	1976	Hunan	
2	Liu Shaoqi	刘少奇	New	Renewed	1898	1921	1969	Henan	
3	Ren Bishi	任弼时	Old	Renewed	1904	1922	1950	Hunan	

=== 7th plenary session (1944–1945) ===
Members of the Presidium of the 7th plenary session of the 6th Central Committee
Rank	Officeholder	Hanzi	POL	7th SEC	Birth	PM	Death	Birthplace	Ref.
1	Mao Zedong	毛泽东	Old	Reelected	1893	1921	1976	Hunan	
2	Zhu De	朱德	New	Reelected	1886	1925	1976	Sichuan	
3	Liu Shaoqi	刘少奇	Old	Reelected	1898	1921	1969	Henan	
4	Zhou Enlai	周恩来	Comeback	Reelected	1898	1921	1976	Jiangsu	
5	Ren Bishi	任弼时	Old	Reelected	1904	1922	1950	Hunan	

== Bibliography ==
- Dillon, Michael (2020). Zhou Enlai: The Enigma Behind Chairman Mao. I.B. Tauris. ISBN 978-1-7845-3615-2.
- Hartman, Ray T. (2023). Self-Reflections of Fears and Dreams: Political Legitimacy and Strategic Thinking Among Chinese Communist Party Leaders, 1927-1953. Lexington Books. ISBN 9781666916850.
