= Central Organization and Propaganda Leading Group =

The Central Organization and Propaganda Leading Group (Chinese: 中央组织宣传领导小组; pinyin: Zhōngyāng Zǔzhī Xuānchuán Lǐngdǎo Xiǎozǔ) was an agency under the Politburo of the Chinese Communist Party that existed during the Cultural Revolution.

The COPLG was officially established in 1970 by decision of the Central Committee of the Chinese Communist Party as a body "under the leadership of the Political Bureau of the Central Committee", whose jurisdiction included the CCP Organization Department, the Central Party School, the People's Daily, the Red Flag magazine, the Xinhua News Agency, the Guangming Daily, the Central Broadcasting Administration and the CPC Bureau for the Translation of Marx–Engels–Lenin–Stalin Works. In addition to those bodies, which continued to have their own leadership structures, the COPLG controlled directly the CCP Propaganda Department, the Political Studies Office and the May 7 Cadre Schools.

The COPLG included Kang Sheng as group leader, and Jiang Qing, Zhang Chunqiao, Yao Wenyuan, Ji Dengkui and Li Desheng as group members.

== See also ==
- Cultural Revolution Group
