= 5th Politburo Standing Committee of the Chinese Communist Party =

The 5th Politburo Standing Committee of the Chinese Communist Party, formally the Standing Committee of the Political Bureau of the 5th Central Committee of the Communist Party of China, was elected by the 1st plenary session of the 5th Central Committee in 1927, in the aftermath of the 5th National Congress of the Chinese Communist Party (CCP). It was succeeded by the 6th Politburo Standing Committee in 1928.

== Convocations ==
Disclosed convocations of the 5th Politburo Standing Committee
Date	Length	Type	Ref.
4 July 1927	1 day	Ordinary meeting	
6 December 1927	1 day	Ordinary meeting	

== Composition ==
=== 1st plenary session (May–July 1927) ===
Members of the Politburo Standing Committee of the 5th Central Committee
Rank	Officeholder	Hanzi	4th CSC	1st PLE	Birth	PM	Death	Birthplace	Ref.
1	Chen Duxiu	陈独秀	New	Not	1879	1921	1942	Anhui	
2	Zhang Guotao	张国焘	Old	Renewed	1897	1921	1979	Sichuan	
3	Cai Hesen	蔡和森	New	Not	1895	1921	1931	Shanghai	

=== Provisional Standing Committee (July–August 1927) ===
Members of the Politburo Standing Committee of the 5th Central Committee
Rank	Officeholder	Hanzi	1st PLE	POL	Birth	PM	Death	Birthplace	Ref.
1	Zhang Guotao	张国焘	Old	Not	1897	1921	1979	Sichuan	
2	Li Weihan	李维汉	New	Renewed	1896	1921	1984	Hunan	
3	Zhou Enlai	周恩来	New	Not	1898	1921	1976	Jiangsu	
4	Li Lisan	李立三	New	Not	1899	1921	1967	Hunan	
5	Zhang Tailei	张太雷	New	Not	1898	1921	1927	Jiangsu	

=== Politburo meeting (August–November 1927) ===
Members of the Politburo Standing Committee of the 5th Central Committee
Rank	Officeholder	Hanzi	PSC	POL	Birth	PM	Death	Birthplace	Ref.
1	Qu Qiubai	瞿秋白	New	Renewed	1899	1921	1935	Fujian	
2	Li Weihan	李维汉	Old	Renewed	1896	1921	1984	Hunan	
3	Su Zhaozheng	苏兆征	New	Renewed	1885	1925	1929	Guangdong	

=== Politburo meeting (1927–1928) ===
Members of the Politburo Standing Committee of the 5th Central Committee
Rank	Officeholder	Hanzi	POL	6th PSC	Birth	PM	Death	Birthplace	Ref.
1	Qu Qiubai	瞿秋白	Old	Not	1899	1921	1935	Fujian	
2	Li Weihan	李维汉	Old	Not	1896	1921	1984	Hunan	
3	Su Zhaozheng	苏兆征	Old	Reelected	1885	1925	1929	Guangdong	
4	Zhou Enlai	周恩来	Comeback	Reelected	1898	1921	1976	Jiangsu	
5	Luo Yinong	罗亦农	New	Not	1902	1921	1928	Hunan	

== Bibliography ==
- Dillon, Michael (2020). Zhou Enlai: The Enigma Behind Chairman Mao. I.B. Tauris. ISBN 978-1-7845-3615-2.
- Hartman, Ray T. (2023). Self-Reflections of Fears and Dreams: Political Legitimacy and Strategic Thinking Among Chinese Communist Party Leaders, 1927-1953. Lexington Books. ISBN 9781666916850.
