= Zhang Jianmin =

Chinese engineer

- 张建民
- Born: 16 March 1960 (age 66); Shangluo County, Shaanxi, China
- Education: Xi'an University of Technology; Tokyo Institute of Technology
- Scientific career
- Fields: Dynamics; Geotechnical engineering
- Workplaces: School of Civil Engineering and Water Conservancy, Tsinghua University

Chinese name
- Simplified Chinese: 张建民
- Traditional Chinese: 張建民
Transcriptions
Standard Mandarin
- Hanyu Pinyin: Zhāng Jiànmín

Zhang Jianmin (born 16 March 1960) is a Chinese engineer who is a professor and dean of the School of Civil Engineering and Water Conservancy, Tsinghua University, and an academician of the Chinese Academy of Engineering.

== Biography ==
Zhang was born in Shangluo County, Shaanxi, on 16 March 1960. From 1976 to 1978, he worked as a sent-down youth in Danfeng County. He earned a bachelor's degree in 1982, a master's degree in 1984, and a doctor's degree in 1991, all from Xi'an University of Technology. In 1991, he became a visiting scholar at Fukui University, and worked as an engineer at Shimizu Construction Co., Ltd. between March 1993 and March 1998. In 1994, he attended the Tokyo Institute of Technology where he received his doctor's degree in 1997. In April 1998, he joined the faculty of Tsinghua University. He was named deputy dean of the School of Civil Engineering and Water Conservancy in July 2003. He moved up the ranks to become party chief in August 2004 and dean in July 2015.

== Honours and awards ==
- 2009 State Science and Technology Progress Award (Second Class)
- State Technological Invention Award (First Class)
- 27 November 2017 Member of the Chinese Academy of Engineering (CAE)
- 2018 State Science and Technology Progress Award (First Class)
