= Kang Sheng =

Chinese politician (1898–1975)

- 康生
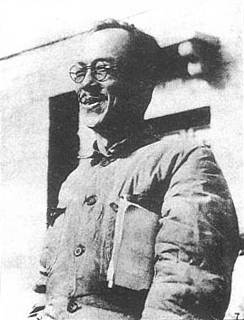

Vice Chairman of the Chinese Communist Party
- In office 9 October 1959 – 16 December 1975
- Chairman: Mao Zedong

Vice Chairman of the Standing Committee of the National People's Congress
- In office 3 January 1965 – 16 December 1975
- Chairman: Zhu De

Vice Chairperson of the Chinese People's Political Consultative Conference
- In office 17 April 1959 – 20 December 1964
- Chairman: Zhou Enlai

Director of the Central Social Affairs Department
- In office 1939–1945

Personal details
- Born: 4 November 1898 Zhucheng, Weifang, Shandong, Qing dynasty
- Died: 16 December 1975 (aged 77) Beijing, People's Republic of China
- Party: Chinese Communist Party (expelled posthumously)
- Spouse(s): Chen Yi (陳宜); Cao Yi'ou (曹軼歐)
- Occupation: Intelligence Chief, Spymaster
- Nickname: "China's Beria"

Kang Sheng
- Chinese: 康生
Transcriptions
Standard Mandarin
- Hanyu Pinyin: Kāng Shēng
- Wade–Giles: K'ang1 Sheng1

Zhang Zongke
- Simplified Chinese: 张宗可
- Traditional Chinese: 張宗可
Transcriptions
Standard Mandarin
- Hanyu Pinyin: Zhāng Zōngkě
- Wade–Giles: Chang1 Tsung1-k'o3

Kang Sheng (Chinese: 康生; pinyin: Kāng Shēng; 4 November 1898 – 16 December 1975), born Zhang Zongke (simplified Chinese: 张宗可; traditional Chinese: 張宗可; pinyin: Zhāng Zōngkě), was a Chinese Communist Party (CCP) official, politician and calligrapher best known for having overseen the work of the CCP's internal security and intelligence apparatus during the early 1940s and again at the height of the Cultural Revolution in the late 1960s and early 1970s.

A member of the CCP from the early 1920s, he spent time in Moscow during the early 1930s, where he learned the methods of the Soviet NKVD and became a supporter of Wang Ming for leadership of the CCP. After returning to China in the late 1930s, Kang Sheng switched his allegiance to Mao Zedong and became a close associate of Mao during the Second Sino-Japanese War, the Chinese Civil War, and after. He remained at or near the pinnacle of power in the People's Republic of China from its establishment in 1949 until his death in 1975. After the death of Mao and the subsequent arrest of the Gang of Four, Kang Sheng was accused of sharing responsibility with the Gang for the excesses of the Cultural Revolution and in 1980 he was expelled posthumously from the CCP.

== Early life ==
Kang Sheng was born in Dataizhuang (大臺莊, administered under Jiaonan County during 1946-90), Zhucheng County to the northwest of Qingdao in Shandong Province to a landowning family, some of whom had been Confucian scholars. Kang was born Zhang Zongke (張宗可) but he adopted a number of pseudonyms—most notably Zhang Rong (張溶), but also (for his painting) Li Jushi—before settling on Kang Sheng in the 1930s. Some sources give his year of birth as being as early as 1893, but it has also been variously given as 1898, 1899 and 1903.

Kang received his elementary education at the Guanhai school for boys and later at the German-founded Lixian Academy (now Qingdao No. 9 High School) in Qingdao. As a teenager, he entered into an arranged marriage with Chen Yi, in 1915, with whom he had two children, a daughter, Zhang Yuying, and a son, Zhang Zishi. After graduating from the German School, Kang taught in a rural school in Zhucheng, Shandong in the early 1920s before leaving, possibly for a sojourn in Germany and France, and ultimately for Shanghai, where he arrived in 1924.

== Shanghai ==
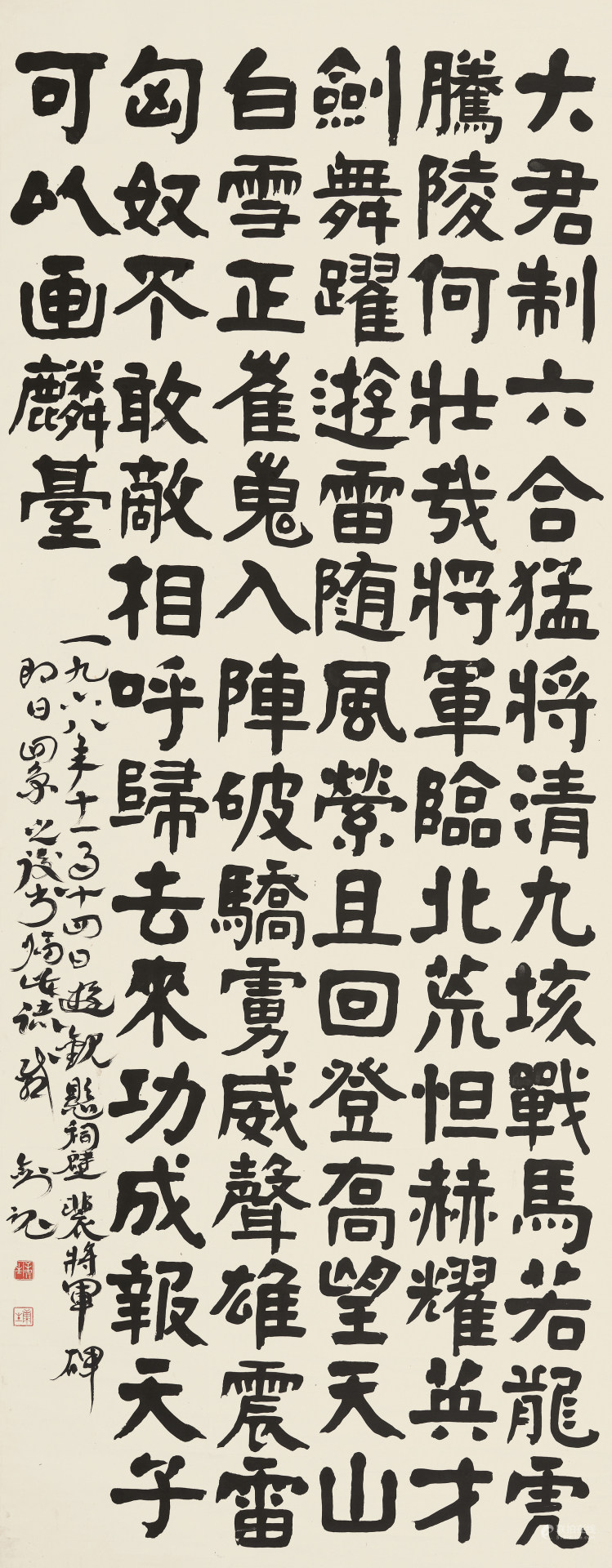
Apart from his political views, Kang Sheng was highly praised for his artistic cultivation, especially his calligraphy

After arriving in Shanghai, Kang enrolled in Shanghai University, an institution under the control of the CCP and the intellectual leadership of Qu Qiubai. After about six months at the university, he joined the Communist Party Youth League. Kang then joined the Party itself.

At the direction of the Party, Kang worked underground as a labor organizer. He helped organize the February 1925 strike against Japanese companies that culminated in the May 30th Movement, a huge Communist-led demonstration, and brought Kang into close contact with Party leaders Liu Shaoqi, Li Lisan and Zhang Guotao. Kang participated in the March 1927 worker's insurrection alongside Gu Shunzhang and under the leadership of Zhao Shiyan, Luo Yinong, Wang Shouhua and Zhou Enlai. When the uprising was put down by the Kuomintang with the crucial assistance of Du Yuesheng's Green Gang in the Shanghai massacre of April 12, 1927, Kang was able to escape into hiding.

Also in 1927, Kang married a Shanghai University student and fellow Shandong native, Cao Yi'ou (born Cao Shuqing), who was to become a lifelong political ally. He entered the employment of Yu Qiaqing, a wealthy businessman with strong Kuomintang sympathies, as Yu's personal secretary. At the same time, Kang remained an active but secret Party organizer, and was named to the Party's new Jiangsu Provincial Committee in June 1927.

In the late 1920s, Kang worked closely with Li Lisan, who had been made head of the Publicity Department at the CCP's Sixth Congress, which for security reasons and proximity to the Comintern's congress was held outside Moscow in mid-1928. Several months after the Sixth Congress, Kang was named director of the Organization Department of the Jiangsu Provincial Committee, which controlled personnel matters.

In 1930, while in Shanghai, Kang was arrested along with several other Communists, including Ding Jishi, and later released. Ding's uncle Ding Weifen, was head of the Kuomintang Central Party School in Nanjing, where he worked with Chen Lifu, head of the Kuomintang's secret service. Kang later denied he had ever been arrested, as the circumstances of his release suggested that he had, as Lu Futan alleged in 1933, "sold out his comrades" in order to secure his freedom. As Byron and Pack note, however, "Kang's arrest in itself is no proof that he was turned by his captors or forced into long-term cooperation with them. KMT [Kuomintang] prisons were notoriously chaotic and corrupt."

After Li Lisan's adventurism and the failed Changsha operation of June 1930 lost Li the support of the Party, Kang moved adroitly to align himself with the Comintern's new favorite, Wang Ming, and Pavel Mif's young students from Sun Yat-sen University, later known as the 28 Bolsheviks, who took control of the Party Politburo at the Fourth Plenum of the Sixth Central Committee on January 13, 1931. Kang allegedly demonstrated his loyalty to Wang Ming by betraying to the Kuomintang secret police a meeting convened on January 17, 1931, by He Mengxiong, who had been strongly opposed to Li Lisan and was disgruntled by Pavel Mif's high-handed role in securing the ascendancy of Wang within the Chinese Communist Party. On the night of February 7, 1931, He Mengxiong and 22 others were executed by the Kuomintang police at Longhua, Shanghai. Among those murdered were five aspiring writers and poets, including Hu Yepin, lover of Ding Ling and father of her child, later canonized as a martyr by the Party.

The April 1931 arrest and defection to the Kuomintang of Gu Shunzhang, former Green Gang gangster and member of the Party's Intelligence Cell, led to serious breaches in Party security and the arrest and execution of Xiang Zhongfa, the Party's General Secretary. In response, Zhou Enlai created a Special Work Committee to oversee the Party's intelligence and security operations. Chaired by Zhou personally, the committee included Chen Yun, Pan Hannian, Guang Huian and Kang Sheng. When Zhou left Shanghai for the Communist base in Jiangxi Province in August 1931, he left Kang in charge of the Special Work Committee, a position he held for two years. In this role, Kang was "in charge of the entire Communist security and espionage apparatus, not only in Shanghai but throughout KMT China."

== Moscow ==
In July 1931, Wang Ming removed himself to Moscow and assumed the position of chief Chinese representative on the Comintern. Kang and his wife Cao Yi'ou followed two years later. Kang remained in Moscow for four years, acting as Wang's deputy on the Comintern, returning to China in 1937. While in Moscow, Kang was elected a member of the Politburo of the CCP, perhaps as early as 1931 but more probably in January 1934.

As Byron and Pack put it, "Kang had no cause to regret working with Wang in Moscow. His own prestige and power grew ever greater, and his cocoon of privilege insulated him from the irritations of daily life. But being in Moscow also excluded Kang and Wang Ming from the drama that was unfolding in China at the time." That "drama" included the epic retreat of the Communists from Jiangxi Province to Yan'an, which became known to history as the Long March, and the ever-growing power within the CCP of Mao Zedong. As the French military historian Jacques Guillermaz observed,

The Long March helped the Chinese Communist Party to achieve a greater independence of Moscow. Everything tended in the same direction—Mao Zedong's appointment as Chairman of the Party, happening as it did in unusual conditions, practical difficulties in maintaining contact, the Comintern's tendency to remain in the background to help the creation of popular fronts, under cover of patriotism or anti-fascism. In fact, after the Zunyi Conference, the Russians seem to have had less and less influence in the Chinese Communist Party's internal affairs. In light of more recent history, this was perhaps one of the major consequences of the Long March.

Wang Ming's influence over the main Communist forces was minimal after Mao Zedong's emergence from the Zunyi Conference of January 1935 as the undisputed head of the Party. From Moscow, Wang and Kang did seek to maintain control over Communist forces in Manchuria, which were ordered by them to conserve their strength and avoid direct confrontation with the Japanese army. This directive, which Kang later denied even existed, was resisted by some Manchurian leaders and later criticized by Mao Zedong as evidence of Wang Ming having stifled Manchuria's revolutionary potential.

Following the assassination of Sergei Kirov in December 1934, Joseph Stalin commenced his great purges of the Communist Party of the Soviet Union. Following this example, and with Wang Ming's support, Kang established in 1936 the Office for the Elimination of Counterrevolutionaries and worked closely with the Soviet secret police, the NKVD, in purging perhaps hundreds of Chinese then in Moscow. As Byron and Pack put it:

Kang gained great power from the Elimination Office, which he used to silence opponents and witnesses to any embarrassing episodes in his past, especially his arrest in Shanghai. … This was not the first time the Chinese in Moscow had fallen victim to purges. Soviet authorities had made numerous arrests at Moscow Sun Yat-sen University during the late 1920s; students disappeared into the night, never to be seen again. But Kang worked his own variation: in the past, the Chinese had been purged by the Soviets; now, under Kang, they were liquidated by their fellow Chinese.

Stalin was more tolerant of the Chinese in Moscow than he was of other foreign Communists, who were purged along with their Soviet comrades. This may have been motivated by a concern about the potential threat of a Japanese invasion of the Soviet Far East. In any case, at this time Stalin began to promote the idea of a united front of the Chinese Communist Party and the Kuomintang against the Japanese, a policy that Wang Ming and Kang quickly endorsed. In November 1937, following the Marco Polo Bridge Incident and the Japanese invasion of China, Stalin dispatched Wang and Kang to Yan'an on a specially provided Soviet plane.

Kang had played a wily game in the complex and murky world of Stalin's Moscow, earning the following comment from Josip Broz Tito, who had met Kang in Moscow in 1935:

It can be said without any shadow of a doubt that at that time Kang Sheng was playing a multiple game. On the one hand he was humoring Stalin, but at the same time he was betraying his confidence. Similarly, he had made contact with the Trotskyists, and had considered joining their movement, but he had also taken steps to infiltrate and sabotage their Fourth International…

Tito made these comments to Hua Guofeng on his only visit to China, in 1977 after Kang was dead, and certainly had his own agenda in doing so, but as Faligot and Kauffer remark, "in any case, Tito certainly got the measure of Kang's psychology: a multifaceted game of mirrors was certainly his style, even in the 1930s."

== Yan'an ==
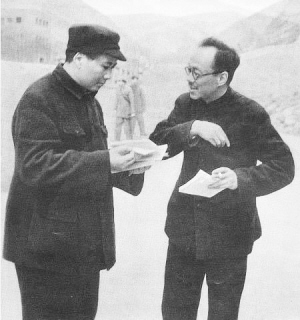
Kang with Mao in Yan'an, 1945

When Kang Sheng arrived in the Party's redoubt at Yan'an in late November 1937 as part of Wang Ming's entourage, he may have already realized that Wang Ming was falling out of favor, but he initially supported Wang and the Comintern's efforts to guide the Chinese Communists back into line with Soviet policy, especially the need to align with the Kuomintang against the Japanese. Kang also brought Stalin's obsession with Trotskyism to play in helping Wang defeat the efforts of Zhou Enlai and Dong Biwu to bring Chen Duxiu—then the informal leader of Trotskyists in China—back into the Party.

After assessing the situation on the ground in Yan'an, however, in 1938 Kang decided to re-align himself with Mao Zedong. Kang's motives are easy to imagine. For Mao's part, as MacFarquhar put it,

Kang Sheng was a valuable catch for Mao as he strove to consolidate the power he had won at the Zunyi Conference in January 1935. Kang could betray all the secrets of Wang Ming and his supporters. He was au fait with Moscow politics and police/terror methods, and sufficiently fluent in Russian to act as a major contact with Soviet visitors. He had absorbed sufficient Marxism-Leninism and Stalinist polemicizing to affect the patina of a theorist, and he was a fluent writer.

At Yan'an, Kang was close to Jiang Qing, who may have been Kang's mistress when he visited Shandong in 1931. In Yan'an, Jiang became the lover of Mao Zedong, who later married her. In 1938, Kang earned Mao and Jiang's gratitude by supporting their liaison against the opposition of more socially conservative cadres, who were aware of her past and uncomfortable with it. Byron and Pack assert that

Kang acted decisively to protect Mao and rebut the charges against Jiang Qing. Invoking his background as head of the Organization Department and as an expert on security and espionage matters, Kang vouched for Jiang Qing. She was a Party member in good standing, he declared, and had no affiliations that would bar marriage to Mao. Kang's personal knowledge of Jiang Qing's past was fragmentary and certainly insufficient to allow him to prove that she was not a KMT agent, but he doctored her record, destroyed adverse material, discouraged hostile witnesses, and coached her on how to answer the probing questions of high-level interrogators who hoped to discredit Mao.

This episode is believed by many to have been key to Kang's future success, which depended not only on his considerable talents but also on his relationship with Mao. In addition to politics, Kang and Mao also shared an interest in classical culture, including poetry, painting and calligraphy.

Mao's relationship with Kang, in Yan'an and later, was mainly based on political calculation. Kang's familiarity with Wang Ming enabled him to provide Mao with valuable information about Wang's subservience to the Soviets. Although cadres such as Chen Yun, who had been in Moscow with Wang and Kang, were aware of Kang's previous slavish support for Wang, Kang strenuously sought to change that history and obscure previous affiliations.

In addition, Mao, who in these years had not yet visited the Soviet Union, used Kang during this period as a valuable source of information about Soviet affairs. Mao was also suspicious of the Russians and, soon after aligning himself with Mao, Kang also began to speak out against the Soviet Union and its agents in China. Peter Vladimirov, the Comintern agent sent to Yan'an, recorded that Kang kept him under constant surveillance and even forced Wang Ming to avoid meeting him. Vladimirov also believed that Kang delivered biased reports of Soviet affairs to Mao.

When Stalin shifted his support from Wang Ming to Mao Zedong, the Personnel Department of the executive committee of the Comintern (the "ECCI") included Kang's name on a list of CCP cadres who should not be included in the leadership. According to Pantsov and Levine,

Once again, the ECCI and, standing behind it, Stalin himself, helped Mao to consolidate his power. This time they even overdid it. Mao did not view Kang Sheng, who had already openly switched to his side, nor several of these other party officials [named in the ECCI Personnel Department memorandum] as his foes. He even tried to defend Kang Sheng in one of his letters to [Georgii] Dimitrov. "Kon Sin [Kang Sheng]," Mao wrote, "is reliable."

While in Yan'an, Kang oversaw intelligence operations against the Party's two principal enemies, the Japanese and the Kuomintang, as well as potential opponents of Mao within the Party, including the campaign against Trotskyites. Vladimirov believed that Kang was behind, at Mao's behest, the attempt by Li Fuchun and Jin Maoyao to murder Wang Ming by means of mercury poisoning, although this claim remains controversial.

Kang taught at the Yan'an Marxism-Leninsm Institute. Kang was deeply involved with the Yan'an Rectification Movement launched by Mao in February 1942, which was "central to Mao's mission of a thorough reinvention of Chinese society." As Rana Mitter writes,

China's wartime existential crisis provided a perfect excuse for the rival, yet parallel, states [in Chongqing, Nanjing and Yan'an] to use similar techniques, from blackmail to bombing, to achieve their ends, and mute the criticisms of their opponents. If each of them paid tribute to Sun Yat-sen in public, they also each paid court to the thinking and techniques of Stalin in private.

In the person of Kang Sheng, Mao had at his disposal a man "trained by one of the world's greatest experts in the abuse of human bodies and minds: the head of the Soviet NKVD, Nikolai Yezhov" As Mitter explains,

Kang Sheng was the mastermind behind the "pain and friction" that underlay the Rectification process. He used a classic Soviet technique of accusing loyal party members of being Nationalist spies. Once they had confessed under torture, their confessions could then set off an avalanche of accusations and arrests. As the war worsened in 1943, and the Communist area become more isolated, Kang stepped up the speed and ferocity of the purges.

Kang was sufficiently brutal in his methods to arouse the opposition of senior cadres, including Zhou Enlai, Nie Rongzhen and Ye Jianying. At the same time, Mao was not keen to have a single man in such a position of power. Accordingly, following the CCP's Seventh Congress in April 1945, Kang was replaced as head of both the Social Affairs Department and the Military Intelligence Department.

Byron and Pack write that "In spite of Kang's decline, his influence on the security and intelligence system was visible for decades to come. The methods he popularized in Yan'an shaped public security work through the Cultural Revolution and beyond." Moreover,

[f]or many victims of Rectification, release and rehabilitation in 1945 after the Seventh Party Congress did not protect them permanently against Kang. During the Cultural Revolution, he searched many of them out, arrested them and charged them again with being traitors or renegades. A standard item of evidence used against them was a record of their arrest in Yan'an during the Rectification Movement—phony charges from the 1940s appeared twenty years later as "proof" of an individual's disloyalty.

== From Yan'an to the Cultural Revolution ==
After his fall from the security posts, in December 1946 Kang was assigned by Mao Zedong, Zhu De and Liu Shaoqi to review the Party's land reform project in Longdong, Gansu Province. He returned after five weeks with the view that land reform needed to be more severe and that there could be no compromise with landlords. "Kang whipped up hatred for the landlords and their retainers. In the name of social justice, he encouraged the peasants to settle scores by killing landlords and rich peasants."

In March 1947, Kang put his methods into practice in Lin County, Shanxi Province, "where Kang Sheng presided over a reign of terror ... [and] fomented all-out class warfare in the countryside by forcing every villager to take a stand." His methods included special scrutiny and persecution of landlords known to have Communist sympathies and investigation of the backgrounds of the Party's land reform teams themselves. In April 1948, Mao singled out Kang for praise in his handling of land reform, with the result that

Agrarian reform cut a bloody swath through much of rural China. Squads of Communist enforcers were sent to the most remote villages to organize the local petty thieves and bandits into so-called land reform teams, which inflamed the poor peasants and hired laborers against the rich. When resentment reached fever pitch, peasants at staged "grievance meetings" were encouraged to relate the injustices and insults they had suffered, both real and imagined, at the hands of "the landlord bullies." Often these meetings would end with the masses, led by the land reform teams, shouting "Shoot him! Shoot him!" or "Kill! Kill! Kill!" The cadre in charge of proceedings would rule that the landlords had committed serious crimes, sentence them to death, and order that they be taken away and eliminated immediately.

In November 1947, the CCP Politburo assigned Kang to inspect land reform in his home province of Shandong. Early in 1948, he was appointed deputy chief of the Party's East China Bureau, under Rao Shushi. Some commentators speculate that the private humiliation of being placed under a former subordinate may be one reason why Kang "fell ill" and largely disappeared from view until after Rao's fall in 1954. Of course, Kang may really have been ill. Mao's personal physician, Li Zhisui, later recorded that doctors responsible for Kang's treatment at Beijing Hospital told him that Kang was suffering from schizophrenia. Writing before Li's book was published, Byron and Pack offered other possible diagnoses based on symptoms Kang seems to have displayed, including manic-depressive psychosis and temporal lobe epilepsy.

Kang's re-emergence on the political stage in the mid-1950s occurred at roughly at the same time as the Gao Gang-Rao Shushi Affair and the affair of Yu Bingbo. Faligot and Kauffer see these affairs as each showing signs of involvement by Kang Sheng, who they believe used them as means to return to power.

In January 1956, Kang made his first public appearance in years at a meeting of the Chinese People's Political Consultative Conference in Beijing. As Byron and Pack write

The challenges that Kang faced during the early months of 1956 underscored the dangers he would have risked by continuing his retreat. As soon as he reappeared, Kang encountered serious problems that caused his position in the hierarchy to fluctuate dramatically. After the purge of Gao Gang and Rao Shushi in 1954, he had ranked sixth, below Chairman Mao, Liu Shaoqi, Zhou Enlai, Zhu De and Chen Yun. But in February 1956, just weeks after his return to public life, he was listed below Peng Zhen. By the end of April he was reported in tenth place, even below Luo Fu, the only member of the 28 Bolsheviks who still held a Politburo seat. Yet on May Day of 1956—the international socialist celebration—Kang was suddenly back in sixth place. His position, at least going by public reports and official bulletins, remained unchanged from then until the Eighth Congress four months later.

Kang suffered a severe reversal of fortune at the Central Committee plenum that followed the first session of the CCP's Eighth Congress, when he was demoted to alternate, nonvoting membership of the Politburo. Roderick MacFarquhar writes:

The reasons for Kang Sheng's reduction to alternate membership of the Politburo are not clear. … The immediate reason for his demotion may have been the general revulsion against secret police within the communist bloc after Khrushchev's Secret Speech. Kang Sheng's emergence during the cultural revolution as one of the most important Maoist stalwarts suggests that…it is not unlikely that at the 8th Congress Mao saved Kang from even greater humiliation.

Mao's own position was weakening, as evidenced by the decision of the CCP's Eighth Congress to delete the phrase "guided by the thought of Mao Zedong" from the new Party constitution and by re-establishing the role of General Secretary, abolished in 1937. The dangers of exalting a single leader and the desirability of collective leadership had been perhaps the most direct point of Khrushchev's Secret Speech to the Twentieth Congress of the Communist Party of the Soviet Union (the "CPSU") in February 1956, in which he condemned Stalin, Stalin's methods and his cult of personality and which, according to Archie Brown, "was the beginning of the end of international Communism."

While Kang remained a member of the Politburo, he had no concrete role and no power base, which led him to take on a series of diverse assignments and to align himself as closely as possible with Mao, who was devising his response to de-Stalinization and its effects within the leadership of the CCP. His responses, in the Hundred Flowers and the Anti-Rightist Campaign that followed, marked a profound turning point in the history of the People's Republic of China. As Maurice Meisner wrote:

The period of the Hundred Flowers was the time when the Chinese abandoned the Soviet model of development and embarked on a distinctively Chinese road to socialism. It was the time that China announced its ideological and social autonomy from the Soviet Union and its Stalinist heritage. It is a cruel and tragic irony that the break with the Stalinist pattern of socioeconomic development was not accompanied by a break with Stalinist methods in political and intellectual life. The latter was precluded by the suppression of the critics who had briefly "bloomed and contended" in May and June 1957.

As noted in connection with the Yan'an Rectification Movement launched 15 years earlier, Kang Sheng played an important role in bringing Stalinist methods of repression to China.

Kang was clearly a supporter of Mao during the period of the Great Leap Forward and its aftermath and, as MacFarquhar writes, "[h]e was the beneficiary of Mao's practice of preserving and protecting those whom he trusted and relied upon, and for whom he saw a future use." As a result, Kang received a number of important positions during the late 1950s, including in 1959 responsibility for the Central Party School.

Among Kang's most important activities in this period were those related to the deepening split with the Soviet Union, about which Mao and others regarded him as something of an expert. Among his assignments from the Politburo was to draft a long article that appeared in The People's Daily on December 29, 1956, under the title "More on the Historical Experience of the Dictatorship of the Proletariat" and which expressed the Party's position that Stalin's achievements overshadowed his mistakes.

Kang visited the Soviet Union and various socialist countries in Eastern Europe on several occasions between 1956 and 1964, expressing increasing disdain for the "revisionist" policies of Nikita Khrushchev and Josip Broz Tito. In February 1960, as the Chinese observer at the conference of the Political Consultative Conference of the Warsaw Pact, Kang made what Jacques Guillermaz described as "a violent attack on the leaders of the United States, their feigned pacifism, their dream of 'peaceful evolution' of the socialist countries, and their repeated sabotage of disarmament." Byron and Pack describe the speech as "a subtle, almost sarcastic critique of Russian foreign policy that became a milestone in deteriorating Sino-Soviet relations."

The following year, Kang was one of the Chinese delegates to the Twenty-Second Congress of the CPSU to leave their seats to avoid shaking hands with Khrushchev. Kang was also a member of the delegation that attended a meeting in Moscow in July 1963, which failed to bridge the growing gap between the Chinese and Soviet parties. Among the points of contention, raised in a letter issued by the Chinese Communist Party on June 14, 1963, had to do with de-Stalinization and the allegation that

under the pretext of "combating the cult of the individual," certain persons are crudely interfering in the internal affairs of other fraternal parties and fraternal countries and forcing other fraternal parties to change their leadership in order to impose their own wrong line on those parties.

Jacques Guillermaz asked rhetorically of this criticism, "[c]ould the Chinese really have been thinking of Enver Hoxha?"

The Sino-Soviet rift and the obsession with Khrushchev's revisionism looms large in the coming of the Cultural Revolution, as Mao saw revisionism and de-Stalinization as a threat not only to his own position but also to the very survival of the Chinese Communist Party as a revolutionary force. Accordingly, an appreciation of Kang's role as a supporter of Mao's line in this period helps explain his return to very near the pinnacle of power a few years later.

== Kang Sheng and the Cultural Revolution ==
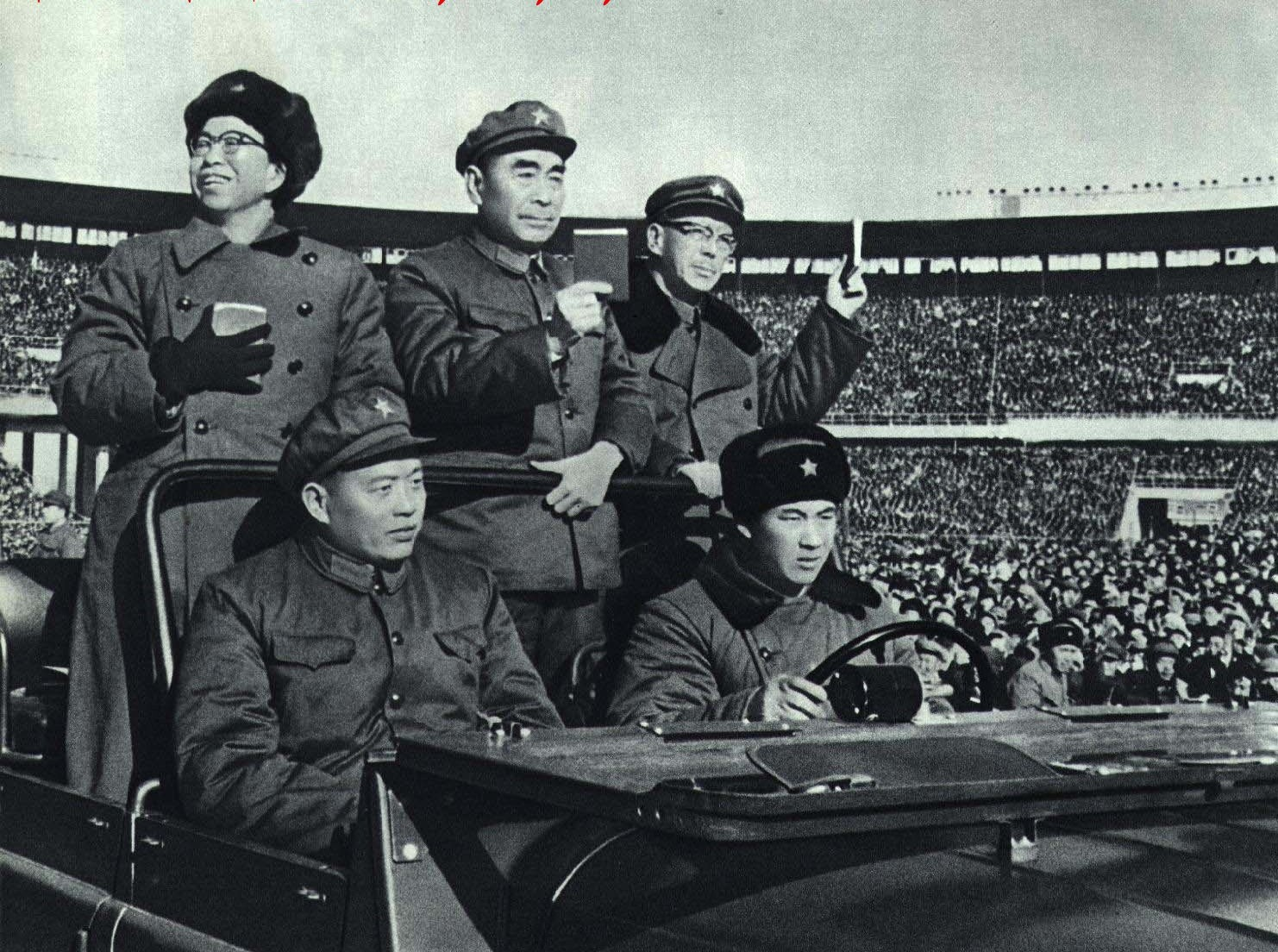
Kang (top right) during the Cultural Revolution, with Jiang Qing and Zhou Enlai

As an ally of Mao Zedong in his effort to regain control of the CCP, Kang was an important enabler of and participant in the Cultural Revolution, later described by the CCP's Central Committee as having "lasted from May 1966 to October 1976" and as "responsible for the most severe setback and heaviest losses suffered by the Party, the state and the people since the founding of the People's Republic." The Central Committee resolution concluded that the Cultural Revolution "was initiated and led by Comrade Mao Zedong." In outlining the "errors" that had been made by Mao and others in the run-up to the Cultural Revolution, the Central Committee noted that "[c]areerists like Lin Biao, Jiang Qing and Kang Sheng, harbouring ulterior motives, made use of these errors and inflated them."

Well before the start of the Cultural Revolution as such, of course, Kang played his part in attacking rivals of Mao in the Party leadership. In the early 1960s, many of these cadres were unhappy with a range of policies as well as Mao's refusal to rehabilitate Peng Dehuai, the former Defense Minister and as well as an early outspoken critic of the Great Leap Forward. In addition, the Great Chinese Famine that had followed the Great Leap Forward had aroused serious doubts among Mao's colleagues in the CCP leadership about the wisdom of his choices in leading China to socialism, with many preferring the direction set by Liu Shaoqi. As the chronicler of the famine Yang Jisheng has observed:

The three-year Great Famine undoubtedly intensified the divisions between Mao and Liu. Unreconciled to the failure of the Three Red Banners, Mao ... blamed it on "revisionism" and "class enemies." Combatting and preventing "revisionism" was therefore the chief task of the Cultural Revolution, as Mao tried to clear the way for establishing his utopia. This meant attacking "capitalist road power-holders" such as Liu Shaoqi, whose attempts to address the problems left over from the Great Famine by giving peasants more autonomy in growing crops and taking a softer line in international affairs were labeled a "counterrevolutionary revisionist line."

Already in the late 1950s, Mao's position had weakened following Khrushchev's condemnation of Stalin's methods and cult of personality. Mao was further unsettled by subsequent developments in the Soviet Union, of which he became increasingly critical and accused of "revisionism" and abandoning the class standpoint, especially following the adoption by the 22nd congress of the Communist Party of the Soviet Union in October 1961 of theories of "peaceful coexistence" that he regarded as anathema. As Yang Jisheng observes, "Under Mao's renewed emphasis on class struggle, 'revisionism,' 'right-deviating opportunism,' and 'capitalist restoration' became interlinked concepts. ... From the 1960s onward, Mao treated fighting revisionism as a crucial political task."

Kang may or may not have shared these views, but he exploited Mao's concerns about the threat to the chairman's vision for China's path to socialism presented by "rightists" and "revisionists" who did not entirely share that vision, especially those holding positions in the CCP hierarchy. At the 10th Plenum of the Eighth CCP Central Committee in September 1962, Kang persuaded Mao to use the publication of a novel about Liu Zhidan, a Party member killed in battle against the Kuomintang in 1936, successfully insinuating that the novel's publication was an effort by Xi Zhongxun, Jia Tuofu and Liu Jingfan to reverse the Party's verdict on their former associate Gao Gang and thus "anti-Party." As a result of this, the Central Committee appointed Kang to head a special investigation committee to examine the cases of Xi, Jia and Liu. As MacFarquhar writes,

Two months later, [Kang] moved to the Diaoyutai guest complex in the capital to mastermind a team of ideologues for the campaign against Soviet revisionism. The most cynical hit-man of Mao's Cultural Revolution swat team was now an agent in place, helping to initiate the domestic and foreign policies that were the prelude to that cataclysm.

In July 1964, Kang, then chairman of the Central Committee's Theoretical Committee, was appointed to a five-member Cultural Revolution Small Group under the Central Committee to lead criticism of revisionism in the cultural and academic domains. The group was chaired by Peng Zhen, a Party member since 1923 who was by 1964 the fifth-ranking member of the CCP Central Committee as well as First Secretary of the Beijing Municipal Party Committee and mayor of the capital city.

In January 1965, Mao suggested to the Party Politburo that the principal enemies of socialism in China were "those people in authority within the Party who are taking the capitalist road" and urged that the Party undertake a "cultural revolution." Mao, Chen Boda, and Kang began eroding Peng's base of support until Mao stated their direct attack "Peng Zhen, the Publicity Department, and the Beijing Party Committee had shielded bad people while suppressing leftists." In May 1966 Peng Zhen, along with Luo Ruiqing, Lu Dingyi and Yang Shangkun were stripped of all official positions. In its verdict on the event long afterwards, the CCP Central Committee concluded, "Lin Biao, Jiang Qing, Kang Sheng, Zhang Chunqiao and others ...exploited the situation to incite people to 'overthrow everything and wage full-scale civil war.'". Yang Jisheng observes that:

Rather than say that the downfall of Peng, Luo, Lu and Yang was part of the Cultural Revolution, it would be more accurate to say that it was crucial preparation for Mao's comprehensive launch of the Cultural Revolution. Eliminating those four people made Mao feel safer.

The Cultural Revolution was effectively launched when the CCP Central Committee passed a circular on 16 May 1966, the text of which Mao, with assistance from Kang, Chen Boda, Jiang Qing and others, had been instrumental in drafting. Kang became an adviser to the Central Cultural Revolution Small Group, chaired by Chen Boda, upon the group's formal establishment by the Central Committee in late May 1966. After the 11th plenary session of the central committee in August 1966, Kang became a member of the powerful Politburo Standing Committee.

Earlier in 1966, Kang Sheng sent his wife, Cao Yi'ou, to Peking University as part of a team designed to rally leftists against the university president, Lu Ping, and other officials aligned with Peng Zhen. Cao sought out Nie Yuanzi, a Party branch secretary in the Philosophy Department with whom Kang and Cao had become acquainted years earlier in Yan'an. With information from Cao Yi'ou that Lu Ping had lost high-level Party protection, Nie Yuanzi and her leftist allies wrote an infamous big-character poster attacking the university leadership and launching a movement that over the next three months threw Beijing University into chaos.

More significantly for the rest of China, Mao approved the contents of Nie's poster and at the beginning of June wrote the following memorandum: "Comrades Kang Shen and Chen Boda: This text can be broadcast in full by the Xinhua News Agency and published in all the country's newspapers. It is essential. The smashing of that reactionary fortress, Beiing University, can now begin. Please handle as you see fit." Kang and Chen made certain that the full text of Nie's poster was nationally broadcast in full, along with Mao's praise of it as "China's first Marxist-Leninist big-character poster" on the day they received the chairman's memorandum. As Yue Daiyun wrote about the effects on society: "With no limits imposed, no guidance offered, no one assuming responsibility for what occurred, and the Red Guards merely following their impulses, the assault upon their elders and the destruction of property grew completely out of control."

Kang was a member of the Central Case Examination Group, which the Politburo established in 1966 to prosecute individuals deemed as "anti-party".

In 1968, Mao and other leaders finally began to rein in the Red Guards, with Kang Sheng playing a leading role. In January Kang denounced the Hunan Shengwulian coalition of Red Guards as "anarchists" and "Trotskyists," launching a campaign of brutal suppression over the following months by the army and secret police. By July, when Mao joked with a group of Red Guard leaders that he himself was the "black hand" suppressing campus revolutionaries, the glory days of the movement were ending.

In the turbulent years of the Cultural Revolution, Kang remained close to the pinnacle of power and, as the "evil genius" within the Central Case Examination Group (the "CCEG") established by the CCP Politburo on 24 May 1966, was instrumental in Mao's efforts to purge many senior Party officials, including his most senior rival within the Party, Liu Shaoqi. In the subsequent trial of the so-called "Gang of Four," one of the accusations leveled against Jiang Qing was that she conspired "with Kang Sheng, Chen Boda, and others to take it upon themselves to convene the big meeting [on 18 July 1967] to apply struggle-and-criticism to Liu Shaoqi, and to carry out a search of his house, physically persecuting the Head of State of the People's Republic of China." Xiao Meng testified at the trial that "the slander and persecution of [Liu Shaoqi's wife] Wang Guangmei was plotted by Jiang Qing and Kang Sheng in person."

Kang's position on the CCEG gave him enormous, if invisible power. The very existence of the CCEG remained a secret, "[y]et," as MacFarquhar and Schoenhals wrote,

During its thirteen-year existence, the CCEG had powers far exceeding not only those once exercised by the Party's Discipline Inspection Commission and Organization Department, but even those of the central public security and procuratorial organs and the courts. The CCEG made the decision to "ferret out," persecute, arrest, imprison and torture "revisionist" [Central Committee] members and many lesser political enemies. Its privileged employees were the Cultural Revolution equivalent of Vladimir Lenin's Cheka and Adolf Hitler's Gestapo. Whereas the [Central Cultural Revolution Group] at least nominally dealt in "culture," the CCEG dealt exclusively in violence. The CCEG was established as an ad hoc body but soon became a permanent institution with a staff of thousands that, at one point, was investigating no fewer than 88 members and alternate members of the Party Central Committee for suspected "treachery," "spying," and/or "collusion with the enemy."

During the Cultural Revolution, Kang also abused his position to personal advantage. A gifted painter and calligrapher, he used his power to indulge his penchant for collecting antiques and works of art, notably inkstones. According to Byron & Pack, many of the Cultural Revolution leaders also used the lawlessness of the period to acquire for themselves objects seized from the homes of persons attacked by Red Guards. But Kang, in a series of visits to the Cultural Relics Bureau, "helped himself to 12,080 volumes of rare books—more than were taken by any other radical leader, and 34 percent of all the rare books removed—and 1,102 antiques, 20 percent of the total. Only Lin Biao, who, as Mao's designated heir, ranked second in the land, appropriated more antiques than Kang."

Kang Sheng was instrumental in supervising the drafting of the new Party Constitution, adopted at the CCP's Ninth Congress in April 1969, which reinstated "Mao Zedong Thought" alongside Marxism-Leninism as the theoretical basis for the Party. The Congress elected Kang as one of the five members of the Politburo Standing Committee, along with Mao, Lin Biao, Zhou Enlai and Chen Boda. At the Ninth Congress, Kang Sheng's wife, Cao Yi'ou, was herself elected to the Central Committee.

The Constitution drafted under Kang's supervision and adopted at the Ninth Congress stipulated that "Comrade Lin Biao is Comrade Mao Zedong's close comrade-in-arms and successor." Kang Sheng and Lin Biao were not close allies, although Kang had earlier assisted Lin in his successful efforts to remove Marshal He Long, a formidable rival to Lin's wish to control the People's Liberation Army. In the wake of Lin Biao's aborted coup attempt and death in September 1971, Kang was careful to distance himself from Mao's disgraced former heir and from Chen Boda, who had been closely aligned with Lin at the Central Committee meeting in Lushan in August 1970 and who was denounced after Lin's fall as "China's Trotsky." Efforts to link Kang to Lin Biao's plotting were unsuccessful and unsubstantiated.

For the remainder of his life, Kang Sheng was actively involved in controlling the CCP propaganda apparatus and in November 1970 was appointed chairman of the new Central Organization and Propaganda Leading Group ("COPG"), created under Mao's impetus. The COPG had oversight of the Central Committee Organisation Department, the Central Party School, the People's Daily, the Xinhua News Agency, Red Flag magazine, the Central Broadcasting Enterprise Bureau, the Guangming Daily, and the Central Compilation and Translation Bureau. Because the COPG was effectively under Mao's direct control, it supplanted the Central Cultural Revolution Small Group and became a rival organization to the Central Military Commission Administrative Group, established in 1967 to try to rein in those attacking the military. Ill with the cancer that would eventually kill him, Kang increasingly ceded control of the COPG to Jiang Qing and her close associates, who were always attentive to Mao's wishes.

In his final years, Kang became involved in the Criticize Lin, Criticize Confucius campaign that was created by the beneficiaries of the Cultural Revolution to oppose Zhou Enlai and other veteran officials in the struggle over who would succeed Mao Zedong. Kang was initially active in supporting Jiang Qing, perhaps seeing her as a successor through whom he would exercise power. Kang subsequently shifted tack when it became apparent that Jiang was out of favor with Mao, even going so far as to denounce her as having betrayed the Party to the Kuomintang during the mid-1930s, notwithstanding his support for her when the same charge had been leveled 30 years earlier in Yan'an.

Kang last appeared in public at the Tenth Congress of the CCP, in August 1973. The Tenth Congress adopted a new Constitution that removed the embarrassing reference to Lin Biao as Mao Zedong's successor, but as a sign that his position had not been adversely affected, Kang was named one of five vice chairmen of the Party. His final political act came only two months before his death, when he warned Mao Zedong that Deng Xiaoping opposed the Cultural Revolution and should be purged again, advice that Mao ignored.

== Support for the Khmer Rouge ==
Kang also left a lasting imprint on China's foreign policy. As MacFarquhar writes, "the dual role of Kang Sheng in Mao's campaign against revisionism at home and abroad symbolized the close relationship between Chinese domestic and foreign policy." Kang's contribution to the dispute with the Soviet Union about de-Stalinization has been described above in connection with his efforts to insinuate himself with Mao and developing the ideological origins of the Cultural Revolution.

Perhaps Kang's most important influence over Chinese foreign policy came during the Cultural Revolution when he was instrumental in developing Chinese support for the Khmer Rouge regime in Cambodia. While the mainstream of the CCP leadership supported Prince Norodom Sihanouk as Cambodia's anti-Western and anti-imperialist leader, Kang argued that Khmer Rouge guerrilla leader Pol Pot was the real revolutionary leader in the Southeast Asian nation.

Kang's backing of Pol Pot was an effort to back his own cause within the CCP, as his touting of Pol Pot as the true voice of the Cambodian revolution was in large part an attack on the Chinese Foreign Ministry, whose pragmatic support for Prince Sihanouk's regime was thereby presented as reactionary. As a result of his success in this, the Pol Pot regime came to power and the Khmer Rouge became the recipient of Chinese aid for years to come.

== Death and disgrace ==
Kang Sheng died of bladder cancer on 16 December 1975. He was given a formal funeral, attended by every member of the Politburo except Mao, who did not attend funerals at this stage, and Zhou Enlai and Zhu De, who were both too weak to attend. Marshal Ye Jianying delivered a eulogy in which he praised Kang as "a proletarian revolutionary, a Marxist theoretician, and a glorious fighter against revisionism." He was buried at Babaoshan Revolutionary Cemetery.

In November 1978, Hu Yaobang voiced the first formal criticism of Kang in a speech to the Central Party School. Ruan Ming reports Hu as telling four of Kang's "anti-revisionist scribblers" that:

you four people have played an extremely negative role in the liberation of thought, the role of a brake. As far as I'm concerned, this is because you have come too much under the influence of people like Kang Sheng. … Kang Sheng passed his time reading between the lines looking for "allusions" without taking account of the real subject of articles and the general idea. He made a sort of talent of looking for a particular point he could attack. He had learned this from Stalin, from Andrei Zhdanov and the KGB, and acted thus from the time of the Yan'an era.

Following the arrest of the Gang of Four and the return to power of Deng Xiaoping, criticisms of Kang Sheng grew and a special case group was established to investigate Kang's career. In late summer 1980, the special case group reported to the CCP Central Committee. In October 1980, just in advance of commencing the trial of the Gang of Four, Kang Sheng was posthumously expelled from the CCP and the Central Committee formally rescinded Marshal Ye Jianying's eulogy. His corpse was exhumed from Babaoshan.

In his 1978 speech, Hu Yaobang labeled him as the Chinese equivalent of Dzerzhinsky or Beria, an opinion "shared by a majority of informed Chinese." Most official published material characterizes him as part of "Lin Biao and Jiang Qing Counter-Revolutionary Cliques", although some partially positive biographies have been released in recent years detailing his roles in Communist International, Chinese Civil War and the Yan'an Rectification Movement.

In 2008, the US-based China News Digest released a previously unpublished interview with Kang's widow Cao Yi'ou conducted in the 1980s where she defended Kang and called for the CCP to rehabilitate him. The article was initially blocked in mainland China, although in 2015 it re-appeared on the history section of Sina Weibo.

== Personal life ==
Kang Sheng was considered among the best Chinese calligraphers of his generation with numerous notable works.

He was an avid collector and collected 34,000 books and 5,500 artefacts, many of which were obtained during the Cultural Revolution. After his death, the collection was donated to Jingshan Park.

== See also ==
- Felix Dzerzhinsky
- Lavrentiy Beria

Military offices
| New title | Political Commissar of the PLA Shandong Military District; 1949–1952 | Succeeded by Shu Tong |
Government offices
| New title | Governor of Shandong; 1949–1955 | Succeeded by Zhao Jianmin |
Party political offices
| Preceded by Li Weihan | President of the CCP Central Party School; 1938–1939 | Succeeded by Deng Fa |
| New title | Head of the CCP Central Social Affairs Department; 1939–1945 | Succeeded by Li Kenong |
| New title | Head of the CCP Central Intelligence Department; 1942–1945 | Succeeded by Li Kenong |
| Preceded by | Secretary of the CCP Shandong Committee; 1949 | Succeeded by Fu Qiutao |
| Preceded by Tao Zhu as Head of the CCP Publicity Department | Leader of the Central Organization and Propaganda Leading Group; 1970–1975 | Succeeded by Yao Wenyuan as Head of the CCP Publicity Department |
| Preceded by Lin Biao; Vacant since 1971 | Vice Chairman of the Chinese Communist Party; Served alongside: Zhou Enlai, Deng Xiaoping, Li Desheng, Wang Hongwen, Ye Jianying; 1973–1975 | Succeeded by Zhou Enlai; Deng Xiaoping; Wang Hongwen; Ye Jianying |
