= Chairman of the Chinese Communist Party =

Leader of the Chinese Communist Party between 1943 and 1982

Chairman of the Central Committee of the Chinese Communist Party
- Emblem of the Chinese Communist Party (1942–1996)

- Flag of the Chinese Communist Party (1942–1996)

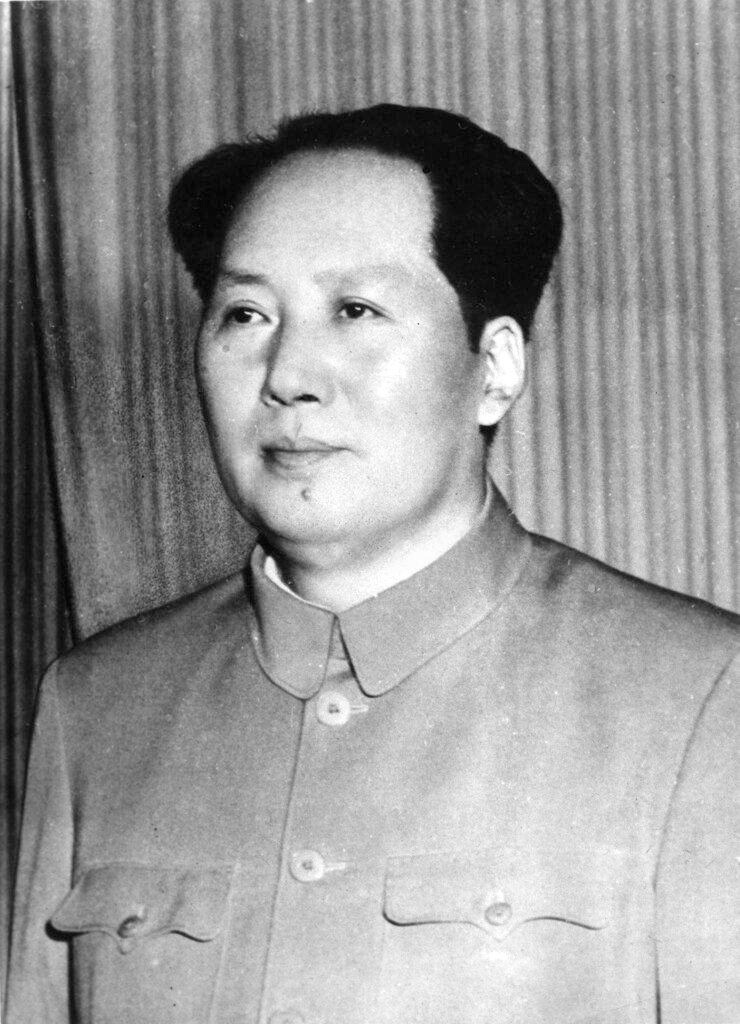
- Longest serving Mao Zedong; 20 March 1943 – 9 September 1976
- Central Committee of the Chinese Communist Party
- Style: Chairman (主席) (informal); Comrade (同志) (formal)
- Type: Party leader
- Member of: Politburo Standing Committee
- Reports to: Central Committee
- Seat: Zhongnanhai, Beijing, China
- Nominator: Central Committee
- Appointer: Central Committee
- Term length: Five years, renewable
- Constituting instrument: Party Constitution
- Precursor: General Secretary (1921–1943)
- Formation: 20 March 1943; 83 years ago
- First holder: Mao Zedong
- Final holder: Hu Yaobang
- Abolished: 1 September 1982; 44 years ago
- Superseded by: General Secretary
- Deputy: Vice Chairman (1956–1982)

Chairman of the Central Committee of the Chinese Communist Party
- Simplified Chinese: 中国共产党中央委员会主席
- Traditional Chinese: 中國共產黨中央委員會主席
Transcriptions
Standard Mandarin
- Hanyu Pinyin: Zhōngguó Gòngchǎndǎng Zhōngyāng Wěiyuánhuì Zhǔxí

Commonly abbreviated as
- Chinese: 中共中央主席
Transcriptions
Standard Mandarin
- Hanyu Pinyin: Zhōnggòng Zhōngyāng Zhǔxí

The chairman of the Central Committee of the Chinese Communist Party was the leader of the Chinese Communist Party. The position was established at the 8th National Congress in 1945 and abolished at the 12th National Congress in 1982, being replaced by the general secretary. Offices with the name Chairman of the Central Executive Committee and Chairman of the Central Committee existed in 1922–1923 and 1928–1931, respectively.

== History ==
=== Background ===
Following the establishment of the CCP, its inaugural leader, Chen Duxiu, held various positions including secretary of the Central Bureau, chairman of the Central Executive Committee (Chinese: 中央执行委员会委员长), and general secretary of the Central Committee. From January 11 to 22, 1925, the 4th National Congress of the Chinese Communist Party issued 11 resolutions, including modifications to the CCP constitution, to succinctly encapsulate the revolutionary experiences acquired during the First United Front. The Chairman of the Central Executive Committee was reappointed as General Secretary, and Chen Duxiu was elected as General Secretary of the Central Committee and Director of the Central Organization Department.

In June 1935, during the Red Army's Long March, a debate emerged on the army's subsequent path of march after the Red First Front Army and the Red Fourth Front Army convened in Maogong. Mao Zedong directed a segment of the Red First Front Army northward to Shaanxi, whereas Zhang Guotao commanded the Red Fourth Front Army southward to Sichuan. On October 5, 1935, Zhang Guotao established a distinct "Central Committee of the Chinese Communist Party" (historically referred to as the "Second Central Committee") in Zhuomudiao, Markang County, Sichuan. Zhang Guotao was designated as the "Chairman of the Central Committee of the Chinese Communist Party", marking the initial appearance of the title "Central Committee Chairman" within the CCP. However, under the influence of the Communist International (Comintern) and the CCP's Central Committee, Zhang Guotao was compelled to dissolve his "Second Central Committee". On June 6, 1936, Zhang Guotao officially declared the dissolution of the "Second Central Committee" and his resignation as "Party Chairman", a position that was not formally acknowledged by the CCP. Mao Zedong was the inaugural Chairman of the Central Committee acknowledged by the CCP.

=== Establishment ===
To prevent further division within the CCP, the Politburo convened on March 20, 1943, and resolved that the Secretariat would consist of Mao Zedong, Liu Shaoqi, and Ren Bishi, with Mao Zedong serving as the chairman of both the Politburo and the Secretariat, in addition to leading the Central Party School. As his replacement, Mao Zedong, who had been the de facto leader of the party since the Long March, was named Chairman of the Politburo of the CCP Central Committee (Chinese: 中国共产党中央政治局主席). The 7th CCP National Congress introduced the post of Chairman of the Central Committee into the party constitution, and in 1956 the General Secretary was given the day-to-day management of the Secretariat.

The chairman was elected by the Central Committee in a plenary session and had full powers over the Central Committee, the Politburo, and its Standing Committee. The 1956 Party Constitution introduced the multiple vice chairman post; since 1945, actual vice chairmanship had been exercised by the Secretariat members. Liu Shaoqi was the highest-ranking vice-chairman from 1956 to 1966.

The 1969 CCP Constitution (adopted by the 9th Congress) introduced the post of a single vice chairman, in order to give more authority to Lin Biao as Mao's successor. The 1973 Constitution (adopted by the 10th Congress) re-introduced the collective vice chairmanship. In 1976, Hua Guofeng was named the first vice chairman of the Central Committee, a post previously held unofficially by Liu Shaoqi from 1956 to 1966; Zhou Enlai from 1973 to 1975; and Deng Xiaoping in 1975 in the capacity of "Vice Chairman in charge of the day-to-day work of the Central Committee".

The 1975 constitution reinforced the influence of the party on the state. The National Defense Council was abolished. Article 15 made the Chairman the commander-in-chief of the People's Liberation Army ("the Chairman of the Central Committee of the Chinese Communist Party leads all the armed forces of the country").

=== Abolishment ===
Although Hua Guofeng succeeded Mao as party chairman, by 1978 he had lost power to vice chairman Deng Xiaoping, who at that point had become the de facto leader. By the 1980s, the CCP leadership desired to prevent a single leader from rising above the party, as Mao had done.

On September 1, 1982, the CCP convened its Twelfth Congress, during which it resolved to amend the CCP Constitution to eliminate the position of Chairman of the Central Committee, retaining only the role of General Secretary of the Central Committee. It established that the responsibilities of the General Secretary would include convening meetings of the Politburo of the Central Committee and the Standing Committee of the Politburo, as well as presiding over the operations of the Central Committee Secretariat. The party's last chairman, Hu Yaobang, transferred to the post of General Secretary.

== List of chairmen ==
=== Chairman of the Central Politburo ===
Portrait	Name (birth–death)	Term of office			Ref.
Portrait	Name (birth–death)	Took office	Left office	Time in office	Ref.
	Mao Zedong (1893–1976)	20 March 1943	19 June 1945	2 years, 91 days	

=== Chairman of the Central Committee ===
Portrait	Name (birth–death)	Term of office			Ref.
Portrait	Name (birth–death)	Took office	Left office	Time in office	Ref.
	Mao Zedong (1893–1976)	19 June 1945	9 September 1976 †	31 years, 82 days	
	Hua Guofeng (1921–2008)	7 October 1976	28 June 1981	4 years, 264 days	
	Hu Yaobang (1915–1989)	29 June 1981	11 September 1982	1 year, 74 days	
