= Smashing the Gang of Four =

October 1976 coup d'état in China

- Part of Cultural Revolution
- Date: 6 October 1976
- Location: Beijing, China
- Caused by: Short term: Dissatisfaction over the Counterattack the Right-Deviationist Reversal-of-Verdicts Trend; Death of Premier Zhou Enlai and the subsequent 1976 Tiananmen incident; Death and state funeral of Mao Zedong; Wang Hongwen setting up a duty room in the General Office without the approval of the Politburo; Long term: Dissatisfaction over the Cultural Revolution; Dissatisfaction over the expansion of the powers of the Gang of Four and the Rebel Faction
- Result: Gang of Four arrested Short term: The end of the Cultural Revolution; Hua Guofeng becomes the paramount leader; The Gang of Four and their supporters arrested and tried by the Special Tribunal of the Supreme People's Court; Expose, Criticize, and Investigate Movement; The Central Working Group enters Shanghai to crush an armed rebellion plot; Long term: Deng Xiaoping becomes the paramount leader; Beginning of Boluan Fanzheng; Beginning of Redressing Wrongful Convictions; Beginning of reform and opening up; The Sixth Plenary Session of the 11th Central Committee adopts the Resolution on Certain Questions in the History of Our Party since the Founding of the People's Republic of China

Parties
Politburo; Central Military Commission: Central Guard Bureau; PLA Beijing Garrison; Beijing Military Region	Gang of Four Unsuccessful participants: Shanghai militia (attempted armed rebellion); Tsinghua University militia; Peking University militia

Lead figures
Hua Guofeng; Ye Jianying; Wang Dongxing; Li Xiannian; Wu De; Geng Biao; Chen Xilian; Su Zhenhua; Wu Zhong Support staff Zhang Yaoci; Wu Jianhua; Qiu Weigao	Arrested; Wang Hongwen; Zhang Chunqiao; Jiang Qing; Yao Wenyuan; Mao Yuanxin Arrested in Shanghai; Chi Qun; Xie Jingyi; Xu Jingxian; Ma Tianshui; Wang Xiuzhen; Jin Zumin

Units involved
PLA Unit 8341	A tank regiment in the Shenyang Military Region (Note: Generally thought to be the 5th Tank Division)

Casualties
- Arrested: Members of the Gang of Four (Wang Hongwen, Zhang Chunqiao, Jiang Qing, Yao Wenyuan) and Mao Yuanxin were arrested along with other of their supporters
- Charged: Case of the Lin Biao and Jiang Qing Counter-Revolutionary Cliques: Organizing and leading a counter-revolutionary group; Conspiracy to overthrow the government; Inciting armed rebellion; Counter-revolutionary propaganda and incitement; False accusations and frame-ups; Counter-revolutionary assault; Trial results: The Gang of Four were expelled from the Chinese Communist Party and removed from all public office.; The Gang of Four were sentenced to suspended death sentences, life imprisonment, fixed-term imprisonment, and additional deprivation of political rights.

Smashing the Gang of Four
- Simplified Chinese: 粉碎四人帮
- Traditional Chinese: 粉碎四人幫
Transcriptions
Standard Mandarin
- Hanyu Pinyin: Fěnsuì Sìrénbāng

Huairen Hall incident
- Simplified Chinese: 怀仁堂事变
- Traditional Chinese: 懷仁堂事變
Transcriptions
Standard Mandarin
- Hanyu Pinyin: Huáirén Táng Shìbiàn

Huairen Hall coup
- Simplified Chinese: 怀仁堂政变
- Traditional Chinese: 懷仁堂政變
Transcriptions
Standard Mandarin
- Hanyu Pinyin: Huáirén Táng Zhèngbiàn

October 6 coup
- Simplified Chinese: 十月六日政变
- Traditional Chinese: 十月六日政變
Transcriptions
Standard Mandarin
- Hanyu Pinyin: Shíyuè Liùrì Zhèngbiàn

The Smashing of the Gang of Four (also known as the Huairen Hall incident, the Huairen Hall coup, or the October 6 Coup) was a bloodless coup d'état in Zhongnanhai, Beijing, on 6 October 1976, in which Premier Hua Guofeng joined forces with Central Military Commission Vice Chairmen Ye Jianying and Wang Dongxing, together with other important figures in the Chinese Communist Party (CCP), the government and the People's Liberation Army (PLA), to arrest and detain the Gang of Four as well as Mao Yuanxin, Mao Zedong's nephew who acted as his liaison to the Central Committee.

In the early morning of the next day, Hua Guofeng was elected as acting chairman of the Chinese Communist Party and acting chairman of the Central Military Commission at a secret enlarged meeting of the Politburo, ending the Cultural Revolution launched by Mao. Later, the Gang of Four and their followers were subjected to political purges, with some being criminally prosecuted.

== Background ==
After CCP Chairman Mao Zedong's death, a power vacuum emerged within the Chinese Communist Party. The "whatever faction" represented by Hua Guofeng, Wang Dongxing, Chen Xilian, Ji Dengkui and Wu De, the "old guard faction" represented by Ye Jianying and Li Xiannian, and the "Cultural Revolution faction" represented by Jiang Qing, Zhang Chunqiao, Yao Wenyuan, Wang Hongwen, and Mao Yuanxin had huge differences in policy lines, and competed in a fierce internal struggle.

== Plan ==
On September 9, Chairman Mao died. For the next few weeks the Gang of Four retained control over the government media, and many articles appeared on the theme of "principles laid down" (or "established") by Mao near the end of his life. (The words "principles laid down" were themselves supposedly a quotation from Mao, but their canonical status is in dispute.) Urban militia units commanded by supporters of the radical group were placed on a heightened state of readiness.

On 10 September 1976, the day after Mao Zedong's death, Wang Hongwen instructed his staff member Mi Shiqi (Deputy Head of the Documentation Group of the Secretariat) to notify all provinces, municipalities and autonomous regions in the name of the CCP General Office that if any major problems occurred, they should be reported in a timely manner and if important problems were difficult to resolve, they should be consulted; all reports and requests for instructions were to be made directly to Mi Shiqi.

On September 11, Wang Hongwen bypassed the Politburo of the CCP Central Committee and set up a "Central Office Duty Room" in Zhongnanhai. He also notified all parts of China in the name of the CCP Central Office that major issues should be reported to the designated duty personnel; "he attempted to cut off the connection between the CCP Central Committee and Hua Guofeng and the provinces, municipalities and autonomous regions, so that they could issue orders and command the whole country". Hua learned about this from a phone call from Hunan Party Second Secretary Zhang Pinghua. After discussing with Ye Jianying, they decided to warn Wang Hongwen in the name of the Politburo to immediately close the "Central Office Duty Room" that he had set up without authorization, and to notify all parts of the country in the name of the Central Committee that major issues should be reported to Hua.

After making an appointment by phone in advance, Hua went to Li Xiannian's temporary residence in No. 9 Courtyard with the pretext of going to the hospital for a physical examination. He talked with Li for less than ten minutes, saying: "The struggle with the Gang of Four is inevitable, and it is time to resolve it." Hua asked Li to meet with Ye on his behalf to seek's opinion on how to resolve the Gang of Four issue . On the same day, Hua asked Wang Dongxing for assistance, which Wang Dongxing agreed to. On September 14, Li went out under the pretext of going to the Beijing Botanical Garden and went to Ye's residence in Building 9 of Yuquan Mountain. Li Xiannian conveyed Hua's opinion and discussed the matter with Ye. On the same day, Li reported the content of the conversation and Ye's attitude to Hua Guofeng.

On September 16, Hua Guofeng convened a meeting with Li Xiannian, Wu De, Chen Xilian, Ji Dengkui, Chen Yonggui along with others in the State Council meeting hall. During the meeting, Hua Guofeng asked: "How to solve the problem of the Gang of Four raised by Chairman Mao?", to which Ji Dengkui said: "I am afraid we still have to treat these people differently." Hua then excluded the neutral Ji Dengkui from the action. On the afternoon of September 17, the enlarged meeting of the Politburo Standing Committee was held in the Xinjiang Hall of the Great Hall of the People, with the main topics being how to deal with Mao Zedong's manuscripts and whether Mao Yuanxin needed to return to Liaoning. The Gang of Four had a dispute with Hua and Ye. Later, Hua won the support of Chen Xilian and Su Zhenhua.

On September 21, Ye came to Hua's residence to discuss the preliminary plan. On the evening of September 26, after the movie was shown in the State Council auditorium, Hua Guofeng left Li Xiannian and Wu De to discuss the plan. Wu De proposed the form of "arrest" and "veto". After discussion, it was decided to adopt arrest. Hua once again entrusted Li to inform Ye of the results of the secret discussion. At 11 p.m. on September 29, Hua chaired a meeting of the Politburo in the East Hall of the Great Hall of the People, mainly to discuss the arrangements for various activities for the National Day. Hua Guofeng attacked the radicals' media line at the meeting. Jiang Qing emphatically disagreed with Hua, and she insisted that she be named as the new party chairman. During the meeting, Jiang requested that the meeting be adjourned, leaving Jiang Qing, Zhang Chunqiao, Wang Hongwen, Yao Wenyuan, Hua Guofeng, and Wang Dongxing behind. Jiang requested that Mao's documents and archives be handed over to Mao Yuanxin for cleaning and safekeeping, and that the work and materials on letters and visits from the masses handled by the General Office be handed over to the people they organized at Peking University to handle; Hua Guofeng did not respond. The meeting ended inconclusively. On the evening of September 30, the Central Committee held a National Day symposium in the capital on the Tiananmen Gate Tower.

On October 2, Mao Yuanxin dispatched a tank division from the Shenyang Military Region to Beijing, and at the same time asked the Shanghai militia, the Peking University militia, and the Tsinghua University militia to be ready. Li Desheng, commander of the Shenyang Military Region, reported to Ye Jianying that Mao Yuanxin had dispatched troops, and Ye immediately ordered the troops to retreat. The Gang of Four's residences were heavily guarded, with each residence having more than two layers of security. At about 15:00 on the same day, Ye came to Wang Dongxing's office in the South Building of Zhongnanhai to exchange views. That evening, Wang Dongxing, Hua Guofeng, and Wu De talked at Hua's residence in Dongjiaomin Lane. Hua then secretly summoned Wu Zhong, commander of the Beijing Garrison District, and obtained his support. On the afternoon of October 4, Hua and the other three finally finalized the plan.

On the evening of October 4, Ye rushed to Hua's residence to discuss countermeasures. The original plan was to prepare for 10 days after the National Day and then take action depending on the situation; Ye Jianying proposed to take action in advance instead, "strike first, use the fast to defeat the slow", and was determined to "eliminate the four evils by destroying them one by one and establishing them one by one"; Hua decided to "take action no later than the day after tomorrow" and asked Ye to implement the action plan with Wang Dongxing. Ye immediately went to Wang Dongxing's place to discuss everything in detail, so that the action plan proposed by Wang was comprehensive and feasible. On October 4 the radical group warned, via an article in the Guangming Daily, that any revisionist who interfered with the established principles would "come to no good end".

== The arrest ==
At 3:00 p.m. on October 6, the CCP General Office notified the Politburo Standing Committee members to hold a meeting in the Huairen Hall of Zhongnanhai. The contents were as follows: First, to study the issue of publishing the fifth volume of Selected Works of Mao Zedong; second, to study the location of Chairman Mao Memorial Hall. In the afternoon, Wang Dongxing held a short meeting with the action personnel. At 5:00 p.m., there was also a small meeting in the small conference room of the East Eighth Office of Zhongnanhai to assign tasks. Wang Dongxing, Ye Jianying and Hua Guofeng arrived at the Huairen Hall at 6:30 p.m., 7:20 p.m. and 7:40 p.m. respectively. Han Suyin gave a detailed account of the Gang of Four's overthrow:

An emergency session of the Politburo was to take place in the Great Hall of the People that evening. Their presence was required. Since Wang Dongxing had been their ally, they did not suspect him... As they passed through the swinging doors into the entrance lobby, they were apprehended and led off in handcuffs. A special 8341 unit then went to Madam Mao's residence at No. 17 Fisherman's Terrace and arrested her. That night Mao Yuanxin was arrested in Manchuria, and the propagandists of the Gang of Four in Peking University and in newspaper offices were taken into custody. All was done with quiet and efficiency. In Shanghai, the Gang's supporters received a message to come to Beijing "for a meeting". They came and were arrested. Thus, without shedding a drop of blood, the plans of the Gang of Four to wield supreme power were ended.

At 8:30 p.m., Wang Hongwen and Yao Wenyuan arrived at the conference room one after another, they were announced that they would be isolated for investigation; at the same time, the leadership sent people to Jiang Qing's residence to announce the implementation of the same decision. When Wang arrived, his personal guards were asked to stay outside the courtyard, and when several agents from the Central Security Bureau restrained him in the corridor, he shouted, "I'm here for the meeting, what are you doing?" while punching and kicking the agents. Wang came to the hall with his arms restrained, and Hua began to read out the "decision" of the CCP Central Committee to him, but unexpectedly during the reading Wang broke away from the agents and shouted and lunged at Ye Jianying, who was present, but was subdued again before he could reach him. According to historian Immanuel C. Y. Hsu, the coup was not completely bloodless – Wang killed two of the agents trying to capture him, and was wounded himself before being subdued.

Zhang Chunqiao was put under control shortly afterwards. Yao Wenyuan simply said, "Let's go," and followed the soldiers away. Jiang Qing was placed under isolation for investigation in Building 201, west of Chunouzhai, Zhongnanhai. After reading the letter, Jiang Qing asked, "Can I read it again?" She then wrote a sealed letter and entrusted a staff member to pass it to Hua Guofeng. She was then transported to a secret location and placed under house arrest for nearly eight months. She was then transferred to Qincheng Prison. Chi Qun, Xie Jingyi, Mao Yuanxin and others were also arrested. At 10 p.m., Geng Biao arrived at the Central People's Broadcasting Station and handed Hua Guofeng's warrant to Deng Gang, director of the Central Broadcasting Bureau, and then sent people to quickly control the Central Radio Station 3.

== Aftermath ==
After the Gang of Four were arrested, Hua convened an emergency meeting of the Politburo at Ye Jianying's residence in Building 9 of Yuquan Mountain overnight. At around 10 p.m., the meeting was attended by 11 members of the Politburo, including Ye Jianying, Li Xiannian, Wang Dongxing, Chen Xilian, Su Zhenhua, Ji Dengkui, Wu De, Ni Zhifu, Chen Yonggui, and Wu Guixian. Ye Jianying proposed, and the Politburo unanimously approved, that Hua Guofeng be appointed Chairman of the Central Committee and Chairman of the Central Military Commission of the Chinese Communist Party, and that the appointment be ratified by the Central Committee in the future. After the meeting, a resolution on Hua Guofeng's appointment was issued, with a notice to "immediately communicate it within the party." The meeting lasted until after 4 a.m. on October 7.

On October 10, 1976, Deng Xiaoping handed over his letter to Hua Guofeng through Wang Dongxing, reflecting his joy over the arrest of the Gang of Four:

Chinese: 最近这场反对野心家、阴谋家篡党夺权的斗争，是在伟大领袖毛主席逝世后这样一个关键时刻紧接着发生的，以国锋同志为首的党中央战胜了这批坏蛋，取得了伟大的胜利，这是无产阶级对资产阶级的胜利，这是社会主义道路战胜资本主义道路的胜利，这是巩固无产阶级专政。防止资本主义复辟的胜利，这是巩固党的伟大事业的胜利，这是毛泽东思想和毛泽东革命路线的胜利。我同全国人民一样，对这个伟大斗争的胜利，由衷地感到万分的喜悦，情不自禁地高呼万岁、万岁、万万岁！

[The recent struggle against the careerists and conspirators who tried to usurp the Party and seize power took place at such a critical moment immediately after the death of our great leader Chairman Mao. The Party Central Committee headed by Comrade Guofeng defeated these bad guys and won a great victory. This is a victory for the proletariat over the bourgeoisie, a victory for the socialist road over the capitalist road, and a victory for consolidating the dictatorship of the proletariat. It is a victory for preventing the restoration of capitalism, a victory for consolidating the Party's great cause, and a victory for Mao Zedong Thought and Mao Zedong's revolutionary line. Like the people of the whole country, I feel heartfelt joy for the victory of this great struggle and cannot help shouting "Long live, long live, long live!"]

— Deng Xiaoping

On 18 October 1976, the CCP Central Committee issued the Notice on the Incident of the Anti-Party Group of Wang Hongwen, Zhang Chunqiao, Jiang Qing and Yao Wenyuan, requiring all Party members to be informed of Mao Zedong's series of instructions criticizing the Gang of Four, explaining the course of the CCP Central Committee's struggle with the Gang of Four and the reasons for arresting the Gang of Four, and guiding the launch of the "Movement to Expose and Criticize the Gang of Four". On October 21, nationwide denunciations of the Gang began, with the CCP Central Committee announced the crushing of the Gang of Four through radio and newspapers. Guo Moruo, then Vice Chairman of the Standing Committee of the National People's Congress, also improvised the lyrics of "Shui Tiao Ge Tou: Smashing the Gang of Four" on the same day, which was widely circulated at the time. On October 24, 1976, millions of soldiers and civilians in Beijing held a grand celebration in Tiananmen Square to celebrate the crushing of the Gang of Four.

After that, a nationwide campaign of exposing and criticizing the crimes of the Gang of Four and investigating people and events related to the Gang of Four during the Cultural Revolution was launched. On 10 December 1976, the CCP Central Committee issued the Evidence of the Crimes of the Anti-Party Group of Wang Hongwen, Zhang Chunqiao, Jiang Qing and Yao Wenyuan (Material 1) to the whole party and country. On 6 March 1977, the CCO Central Committee issued "Material 2" of the evidence of the Gang of Four's crimes, namely The Counter-Revolutionary Face of the Gang of Four and Their Evil History. In July 1977, the Third Plenary Session of the 10th Central Committee passed Resolution on the Anti-Party Group of Wang Hongwen, Zhang Chunqiao, Jiang Qing and Yao Wenyuan, deciding to expel Wang, Zhang, Jiang and Yao from the Party and revoke all their posts inside and outside the Party. On 23 September 1977, the CCP Central Committee issued "Material 3" of the evidence of the Gang of Four's crimes, namely The Reactionary Fallacies Spread by the Gang of Four in Various Fields. In 1978, the nationwide investigation was basically completed and the campaign to expose and criticize the Gang of Four ended. The CCP announced that the objectives of the campaign were achieved. In December 1978, the third plenary session of the 11th Central Committee ended the nationwide mass campaign to expose and criticize the Gang of Four. From 1980 to 1981, the Special Tribunal of the Supreme People's Court publicly tried the case of the Lin Biao and Jiang Qing counter-revolutionary groups and sentenced them to corresponding penalties.

== Impact ==
The Chinese Communist Party officially describes the event as "the victory of smashing the 'Gang of Four' counter-revolutionary group marked the end of the 10-year turmoil of the 'Cultural Revolution'", arguing that "the 'Gang of Four' had long controlled public opinion, engaged in idealism and metaphysics, formed cliques and factions, and had an extremely bad influence within the Party. If the crimes of the 'Gang of Four' were not thoroughly investigated and their faction was not destroyed, their influence in all aspects could not be eliminated".

Some leftists, neo-leftists and Marxists disagreed with the CCP's accusations against the Gang of Four. For example Charles Bettelheim resigned as chairman of the French-Chinese Friendship Association in 1977, saying the CCP's accusations against the "Gang of Four" were "not convincing at all", "without any Marxist analysis, but only slander and scandal", "a negation of scientific socialism and counter-revolutionary revisionism", "extravagance to the utmost, even to the point of openly distorting the facts, and all crude fabrications". In Peru, the downfall of the Gang of Four convinced Shining Path leader Abimael Guzmán that China had become revisionist and that communist revolution required the directing of a people's war that maintained ideological purity.

Some scholars in mainland China, such as Zhu Xueqin and Wang Zhidong, believe that the incident has certain similarities with the fall of Maximilien Robespierre during the French Revolution. Zhu Xueqin even described the incident as "the fall of Maximilien Robespierre in China speaking French." However, Zhu Yongjia (an important figure during the Cultural Revolution) believes that Zhu Xueqin's view is "completely wrong. We cannot use Western history to fit the reality of China today. We should not use the wrong ideas of some scholars to talk about China's problems. You cannot deceive people by relying on foreign powers."
