= Cao Qing =

Chinese army general

Cao Qing (Chinese: 曹清; born December 9, 1952) is a lieutenant general of the People's Liberation Army of China. Since 2015 he has been a deputy commander of the Beijing Military Region. From 2007 to 2015 he served as director of the Chinese Communist Party's Central Security Bureau (CSB), in charge of the security of top Chinese leaders.

Cao was born in Pingshan County, Hebei. He once served as a bodyguard to Marshall Ye Jianying and took part in the coup which ousted the Gang of Four in 1976 after the death of Mao. He was named the executive deputy director of the CSB in 2006, then elevated to director in 2007. He was appointed deputy commander of the Beijing Military Region in March 2015.

Cao has been an alternate member of the 17th and the 18th Central Committees of the Chinese Communist Party.

Military offices
Preceded by You Xigui	Director of the Central Security Bureau; 2007 – 2015	Succeeded by Wang Shaojun
