= Yang Dezhong =

Chinese general (1923–2020)

- 杨德中

Director of the Central Guard Bureau
- In office December 1978 – August 1994
- Preceded by: Wang Dongxing
- Succeeded by: You Xigui

Communist Party Secretary of Tsinghua University
- In office January 1970 – January 1972
- President: Zhang Rongwen
- Preceded by: Jiang Nanxiang
- Succeeded by: Chi Qun

Political Commissar of the Central Guard Regiment
- In office June 1953 – February 1974
- Commander: Zhang Yaoci
- Preceded by: New title
- Succeeded by: Wu Jianhua

Personal details
- Born: 1 December 1923 Xi'an, Shaanxi, China
- Died: 12 November 2020 (aged 96) Beijing, China
- Party: Chinese Communist Party
- Education: Counter-Japanese Military and Political University

Military service
- Allegiance: People's Republic of China
- Branch/service: People's Liberation Army Ground Force
- Years of service: 1938–1994
- Rank: General
- Battles/wars: Second Sino-Japanese War; Chinese Civil War
- Awards: Order of Liberation (2nd Class; 1955); Order of Independence and Freedom (3rd Class; 1955)

Chinese name
- Simplified Chinese: 杨德中
- Traditional Chinese: 楊德中
Transcriptions
Standard Mandarin
- Hanyu Pinyin: Yáng Dézhōng

Yang Dezhong (Chinese: 杨德中; 1 December 1923 – 12 November 2020) was a general in the People's Liberation Army of China who served as party secretary of Tsinghua University from 1970 to 1972 and director of the Central Guard Bureau from 1978 to 1994.

He was a member of the 12th, 13th and 14th Central Committee of the Chinese Communist Party.

== Biography ==
Yang was born into an intellectual family in Xi'an, Shaanxi, on 1 December 1923, while his ancestral home in Weinan. He attended Xi'an Provincial No. 1 High School and graduated from the Counter-Japanese Military and Political University. He became a member of the Chinese National Liberation Vanguard in 1936. He enlisted in the Eighth Route Army in 1938, and joined the Chinese Communist Party (CCP) at the same year. During the Second Sino-Japanese War, he participated in the Battle of Qingkou and the Battle of South Shandong. During the Chinese Civil War, he engaged in the Battle of Laiwu, Battle of Wei County, Battle of Jinan, Huaihai campaign, and Yangtze River Crossing campaign.

He was political commissar of the Central Guard Regiment in June 1953, and held that office until February 1974. He also served as deputy director of the Central Guard Bureau since 1965. During the Cultural Revolution in July 1968, he marched the Mao Zedong Thought Propaganda Team to stabilize the situation of Tsinghua University. As a result of his distinguished performance, he was made party secretary of Tsinghua University. He was appointed director of the Central Guard Bureau in December 1978, in addition to serving as deputy director of the General Office of the Chinese Communist Party in September 1980 and director of the Security Bureau of the People's Liberation Army General Staff Department in January 1983.

He was promoted to the rank of lieutenant general (zhongjiang) in September 1988 and general (shangjiang) in 1994.

On 12 November 2020, he died in Beijing, at the age of 96.

Military offices
New title	Political Commissar of the Central Guard Regiment; 1953–1974	Succeeded by Wu Jianhua (武健华)
Preceded by Wang Dongxing	Director of the Central Guard Bureau; 1978–1994	Succeeded by You Xigui
Party political offices
Preceded by Jiang Nanxiang	Communist Party Secretary of Tsinghua University; 1970–1972	Succeeded by Chi Qun
