= Xihua Gate =

West gate of the Forbidden City

- 西华门
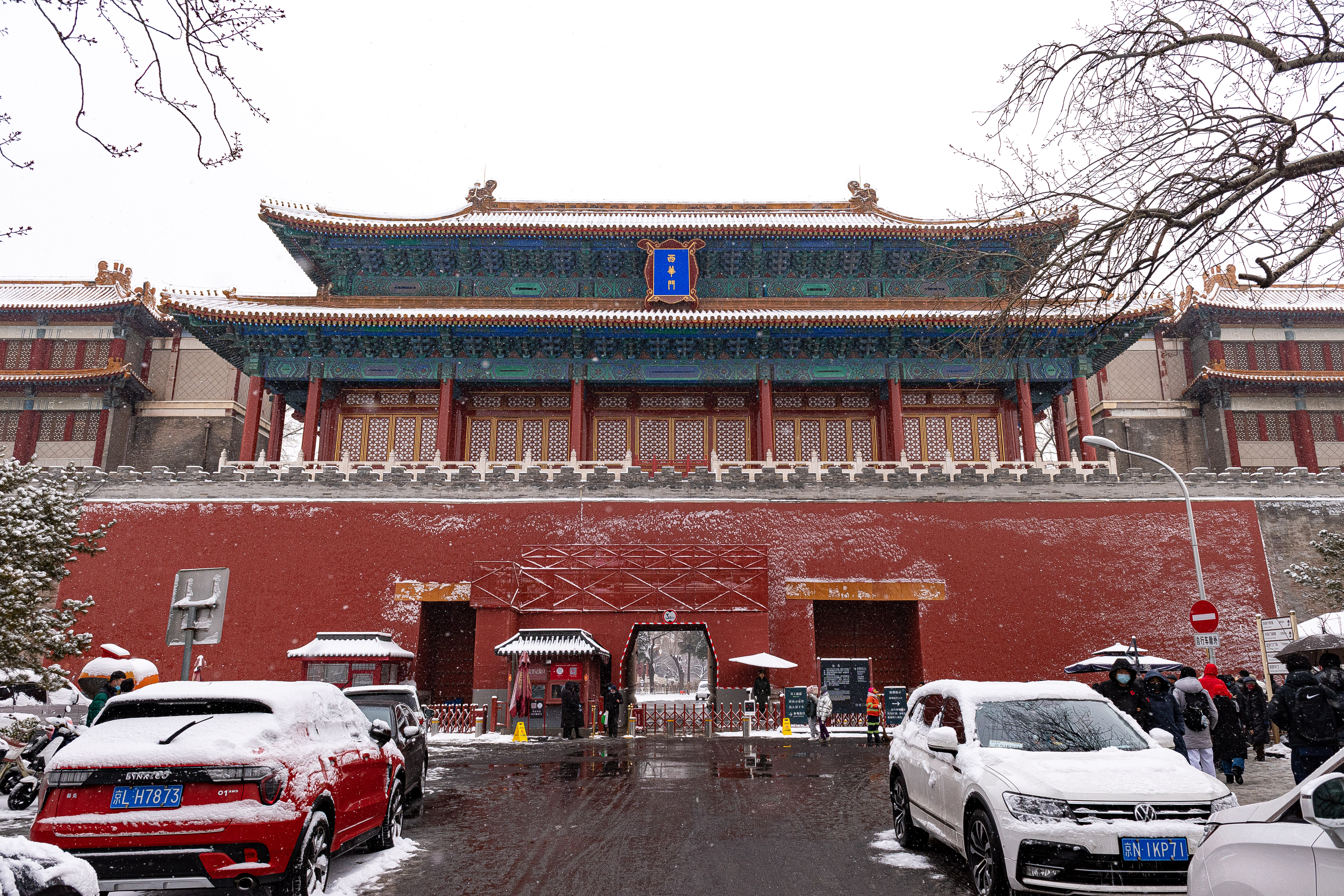
- The gate in February 2022
- Interactive map of the Xihua Gate area
- Alternative names: West Prosperity Gate; West Glorious Gate

General information
- Type: Gate
- Location: Forbidden City, Beijing, China
- Coordinates: 39°55′13″N 116°23′02″E

Xihuamen or Xihua Gate is the western entrance to the Forbidden City in Beijing, China. It is situated just south of the complex's west wall.

== History ==
=== History of Ming and Qing Dynasties ===
Xihuamen was originally constructed in 1420, during the 18th year of the Yongle Emperor's reign in the Ming Dynasty.

Just outside the gate lies Xiyuan, the imperial garden. During the Qing Dynasty, emperors and empresses frequently exited the Forbidden City through Xihuamen when visiting Xiyuan or traveling to other gardens in the western suburbs. In 1751, the 16th year of Emperor Qianlong's reign, a grand celebration was held for the Empress Dowager's 60th birthday. Later, in 1790—the 55th year of Qianlong's reign—Emperor Qianlong marked his 80th birthday with similarly lavish festivities. The route from Xihuamen, passing through Xizhimen to Haidian, was lined with lanterns and decorations. Colorful tents were erected and musical performances staged in advance to honor the occasion.

On July 18, 1813 (the 18th year of the Jiaqing Emperor's reign), the Jiaqing Emperor departed with his entourage for a hunting expedition at the Mulan Paddock, located north of Chengde. In September of the same year, the Tianli Sect, led by Lin Qing, Li Wencheng, and Feng Keshan, launched an uprising against the Qing Dynasty. On October 8, 1813 (the 15th day of the eighth lunar month), Lin Qing dispatched Chen Shuang and others to launch simultaneous attacks on Donghuamen (the East Prosperity Gate) and Xihuamen (the West Prosperity Gate) of the Forbidden City—an event later known as the "Guiyou Rebellion."

On September 16, Qing forces conducted a thorough search of the Forbidden City throughout the day. Before dawn on September 17, the Office of the Infantry Commander dispatched troops to Songjiazhuang in Huangcun, Daxing County, Shuntian Prefecture (present-day Fengtai District) to arrest Lin Qing. While returning to Beijing from Rehe, the Jiaqing Emperor received word that the rebellion had been suppressed. He returned to the palace on September 19. On September 23, the emperor personally interrogated Lin Qing, along with eunuchs Liu Jin, Liu Decai, and others. He then ordered their immediate execution. In his "Edict of Confession in Case of Misfortune," the Jiaqing Emperor described the uprising as "an event without precedent in the Han, Tang, Song, or Ming dynasties." Prince Li Zhaolian echoed the sentiment, declaring, "Has such an incident ever occurred since the beginning of time?"

On October 19, 1819 (the 24th year of the Jiaqing Emperor's reign), a fire broke out at the Wenying Pavilion inside Xihuamen. Upon hearing the news, princes and high-ranking officials outside the palace rushed to help extinguish the blaze. However, they were stopped at the gate by guards stationed at Xihuamen, who insisted that the palace was a restricted area and no one could enter or leave without authorization. At that time, Emperor Jiaqing had already issued an order to open the gate and allow access for firefighting efforts. Despite this, the guards continued to block entry. In response, the emperor dismissed Su Chong'a, the officer in charge of the guards that day, "as a warning to others."

In 1900, during the invasion of Beijing by the Eight-Nation Alliance, Empress Dowager Cixi, Emperor Guangxu, and their entourage fled the Forbidden City through Xihuamen, escaping westward in haste and disorder.

=== Construction of the screen building ===
From the tower at Xihuamen, one can take in a panoramic view of Zhongnanhai. After the founding of the People's Republic of China, Zhongnanhai became the political heart of the nation, making the location of Xihuamen strategically significant. As a result, the gate is heavily guarded by the 8341 Troops and is not open to the public. During the Cultural Revolution, the State Council approved the construction of a new East Wing of the Beijing Hotel. The project was led by architect Zhang Bo—son of Zhang Mingqi, the former Qing Dynasty governor of Guangdong and Guangxi—of the Beijing Institute of Architectural Design. Zhang and a group of young designers initially proposed a 14-story building with a height of approximately 50 meters. While reviewing the scale model of the project, Vice Premier Li Xiannian remarked: "Land in Beijing is scarce. Every piece of land used for construction means the loss of a piece of farmland. Where conditions allow, we should build upward. A valuable site like the Beijing Hotel should be developed with high-rise buildings to maximize the number of guest rooms." Encouraged by this guidance, the younger members of the design team quickly drafted a plan for a 130-meter structure, despite Zhang Bo's objections. When the new proposal was submitted for Li Xiannian's review, he advised that a height of around 100 meters would be more suitable. Zhang Bo, adhering to both organizational principles and Li Xiannian's directive, finalized the design at a height of 100.25 meters.

In the spring of 1973, construction of the project officially began under the direct supervision of Wu Ziyu, director of the Beijing Construction Engineering Bureau. Not long after, Yang Dezhong, the political commissar of the Central Guard Corps, visited the site and informed the Beijing Hotel management, Zhang Bo, and others that Premier Zhou Enlai had noticed the lights from the construction site while walking around Zhongnanhai at night. Concerned by the sight, Zhou felt that the height of the new East Wing of the Beijing Hotel posed a potential threat to the security and visual integrity of Zhongnanhai. Yang explained that he had been sent by Zhou Enlai to assess the situation and discuss possible solutions. During a group discussion, someone proposed raising the height of the Meridian Gate tower of the Forbidden City to shield Zhongnanhai from view. The suggestion was reported to Zhou Enlai, who immediately rejected it. He responded, "First, we must not damage cultural relics; second, we shouldn't do something as foolish as trying to hide what's plainly there." On October 29, 1973, Director Qi of the Beijing Hotel summoned Zhang Bo to attend a meeting in the hotel's conference room. In addition to Zhang Bo and Yang Dezhong, the meeting was attended by Wan Li and Zhao Pengfei, both of whom had previously overseen the construction of the Great Hall of the People, although they had not yet been reinstated to official positions at the time. At the meeting, Zhou Enlai expressed his preference for the original design height of around 50 meters. Speaking to Wan Li, he remarked, "Beijing doesn't need buildings this tall. I think about 50 meters is sufficient. Chang'an Avenue should remain as it is, and buildings along its outer perimeter can be around 60 meters—there's no need to go higher. We shouldn't imitate the West."

Three days later, at 10 p.m., Wan Li and Zhao Pengfei summoned Zhang Bo to the Xinjiang Hall of the Great Hall of the People to finalize the design adjustments regarding the height and treatment of the new East Wing of the Beijing Hotel. About half an hour later, Premier Zhou Enlai also arrived at the Xinjiang Hall to review the revised architectural model and hear the updated report. Zhou expressed his approval of the new plan, which included blocking the west-facing doors and windows of the building and constructing a screen structure at Xihuamen to obscure the line of sight toward Zhongnanhai.

On the morning of November 4, 1973, Premier Zhou Enlai visited the construction site of the new East Wing of the Beijing Hotel for an on-site inspection. He then led Wan Li, Yang Dezhong, Zhao Pengfei, and Zhang Bo to Xihuamen to assess the planned visual barrier. Zhou personally determined the final length of the screen structure to be built at Xihuamen, extending it to nearly four times its originally proposed length. On the return journey, Zhou told Wan Li, Zhao Pengfei, and Zhang Bo: "The New East Building must not be opened for use, even if completed, until the screen structure is finished." He added, "Building additional structures to the west of the East and West Huamen of the Forbidden City serves both national interests and the preservation of the Forbidden City. At the very least, it fulfills a practical purpose—such as 'storing grain.' The 8341 Troops can occupy the screen buildings flanking Xihuamen, and the remaining space can be used to store cultural relics. All structures must match the architectural style of the Forbidden City, and any west-facing windows must be false, designed as blind windows with lattice-style frames in appearance." Based on Zhou's instructions, Wan Li, Zhao Pengfei, and Zhang Bo conducted a preliminary assessment and estimated that the total construction area—including the screen wall and auxiliary buildings—would reach approximately 50,000 square meters. However, the Beijing Municipal Revolutionary Committee expressed financial concerns and indicated that it would be difficult to support the project. In a joint meeting with Wang Yeqiu, Director of the State Administration of Cultural Heritage, and Wu Zhongchao, Director of the Palace Museum, Zhang Bo proposed a cost-saving alternative: building a single screen wall atop a raised platform to reduce labor, time, and expense. Zhou Enlai, however, firmly rejected the idea, remarking, "We cannot build something so out of harmony with its surroundings." In response, Zhang Bo carefully revised the design, and the second version was ultimately approved. The screen structure—later known as the Screen Tower—was successfully constructed.

The Screen Tower was completed in 1975 and stands over 16 meters tall. Its construction led to the demolition of the horse ramps that once flanked the walls of Xihuamen. Although the Screen Tower extends a considerable distance on either side of the gate, it has very little depth, making the interior impractical for functional use. In total, there are five Screen Towers: one located south of Xihuamen and four to the north. The three northernmost buildings were used by the First Historical Archives of China, while the two buildings flanking Xihuamen and the southwest corner of the Forbidden City were occupied by Unit 61889 of the military. These two units represented the primary non-museum entities based within the Forbidden City. With the launch of the Forbidden City's restoration project in 2002, the National Development and Reform Commission approved the relocation of the First Historical Archives of China in 2003. The directive stipulated that "following the relocation, the original buildings should be demolished and the historical appearance of the Forbidden City during the Ming and Qing dynasties should be restored as soon as possible." However, the new facility for the First Historical Archives, located on Qinian Street, did not open until July 19, 2021. Unit 61889, meanwhile, constructed a large compound adjacent to the southern wall of the Forbidden City. The compound housed dozens of buses and included a training facility, basketball courts, and other facilities. At the peak of activity, dozens of buses would enter and exit through Xihuamen each day. In 2012, Jin Hongkui, former vice president of the Palace Museum and executive vice president of the China Forbidden City Society, noted: "In our 2003 plan, we proposed relocating the fire station—currently situated near Wenyuan Pavilion—to the southwest corner of the Forbidden City. This would allow for more efficient emergency access via Xihuamen and improve internal circulation within the palace walls. However, this plan was premised on the relocation of the military units, a matter which has yet to be resolved by the relevant central authorities."

== Architecture ==
Xihua Gate faces east and west, directly opposite Donghua Gate. Outside the gate stands a stone stele marking the spot where riders were required to dismount. Architecturally, Xihua Gate and Donghua Gate are identical in layout, both featuring a rectangular plan. The gate platform is painted red and rests on a white marble base. At the center of the platform are three arched openings, with square outer frames and rounded inner arches. Atop the platform sits a gate tower, crowned with a double-eaved hip roof covered in yellow glazed tiles. The base of the tower is encircled by white marble balustrades. The tower itself is five bays wide and three bays deep, with covered corridors running along its perimeter. The interior beams are decorated with black-line spiral motifs dotted with gold, a traditional Qing decorative style. Historically, the gatehouse was used to store cotton armor and ingot-nail armor for ceremonial military reviews. A plaque bearing the name "Xihua Gate" hangs beneath the western eaves. Originally, the inscription appeared in Manchu, Mongolian, and Chinese. Over time, the Mongolian text was removed, leaving only Manchu and Chinese. After the Xinhai Revolution of 1911, only the Chinese characters, now rendered in copper, remained.

The locations of Xihua Gate and Donghua Gate are not centered on the east and west walls of the Forbidden City but are instead positioned slightly closer to the Meridian Gate (Wumen). This asymmetry is a deliberate result of the overall layout and planning of the palace complex. The Forbidden City is divided into two main sections: the Outer Court and the Inner Court. Within the Outer Court, a horizontal axis is formed by the Wuying Hall, the Gate of Supreme Harmony (Taihemen), and the Hall of Literary Glory (Wenhua Hall). Xihua Gate and Donghua Gate are situated at the two ends of this horizontal axis. Their placement facilitates movement within the Outer Court and helps minimize disruptions to the Inner Court caused by the flow of people and activities. This horizontal axis continues eastward and westward into the Imperial City, aligning with Dong'anmen and Xi'anmen, respectively. As such, Donghua Gate and Xihua Gate serve as crucial transit points linking the Imperial City with the Forbidden City proper.

== See also ==
- Beijing Palace Museum
