= Wang Shaojun =

Chinese army general

Wang Shaojun (Chinese: 王少军; 1955 – 26 April 2023) was a lieutenant general of the People's Liberation Army Ground Force. He had been serving as the director of the Central Guard Bureau since 2015. Wang was born in Yongnian County, Hebei province. He was promoted to the rank of major general in 2008, then in 2010 became the deputy director of the Central Guard Bureau. In March 2015 he was promoted to director.

In Xi Jinping's visit to the Eastern Military Theater in December 2014, Wang was shown accompanying Xi. It was likely that Wang was in charge of Xi's personal security before he took on the role of the director of the CGB. Wang was promoted to lieutenant general in July 2016.

In July 2023, it was announced that Wang had died of an unspecified illness in April 2023.

Military offices
Preceded by Cao Qing	Director of the Central Security Bureau; 2015 – present	Succeeded by Incumbent
