= Central Guard Regiment =

Chinese military unit

Central Guard Unit
- 中国人民解放军61889部队 (PLA Unit 61889)
- People's Liberation Army
- Active: May 1953 – present
- Country: China
- Allegiance: Chinese Communist Party
- Branch: People's Liberation Army Ground Force
- Type: Security
- Role: Close personal protection Surveillance
- Size: Regiment
- Part of: Central Guard Bureau of the General Office of the CPC Central Committee; Joint Staff Department of the Central Military Commission (nominal); People's Liberation Army Ground Force Beijing Garrison 1st Guard Division (nominal)
- Garrison/HQ: Beijing
- Colors: Red and Green
- Engagements: Arrest of the Gang of Four

Commanders
- Notable commanders: Wang Dongxing

The Central Guard Unit (CGU; PLA Unit 61889), formerly known as the Central Guard Regiment (CGR; PLA Unit 8341) is a unit of the People's Liberation Army Ground Force (PLAGF) of the People's Republic of China responsible for providing security to senior members of the Chinese Communist Party (CCP), including the General Secretary, the Politburo, and Central Committee as well as ministers and members of the State Council. It is a powerful political tool for the paramount leader as it can control access to, and conduct surveillance on, its charges.

The CGR is formally subordinated to the Joint Staff Department of the Central Military Commission but political and operation control is exercised by the party through the Central Guard Bureau (CGB) of the General Office of the Central Committee (CGO); CGB deputy directors concurrently hold leadership positions in the CGR. The PLA handles personnel management, training, and logistics.

The CGR has used multiple Military Cover Unit Designators (MCUD). It was known as Unit 8341 or 8341 Special Regiment as part of the 9th Bureau of the Ministry of Public Security at the time of Mao Zedong's death, and Unit 57003 afterwards. More recently, it has been known as Unit 61889. (Note: The changes may correspond to revisions to the MCUD scheme.)

== History ==
=== First formation ===
During much of the 1930s the CCP's main internal security organization was the State Political Security Bureau (SPSB). It was created after Mao Zedong was dismissed as general political commissar of the First Front Army in November 1931. The SPSB was created by absorbing existing organizations, taking over protection of senior CCP members and the secret police roles. The SPSB included a Political Security Regiment and two Brigades of State Political Security for protection duties.

After effectively assuming party leadership after 1935 Zunyi Conference, Mao worked to wrestle control of the security apparatus from the party by undermining the SPSB; SPSB forces were reduced, and Mao's supporters moved into party and SPSB leadership positions. In 1938, Mao created a new security unit, the Central Guard Training Brigade (CGTB). The CGTB was formally commanded by three non-SPSB organizations and was organizationally subordinated to a fourth, the Central Revolutionary Military Committee; Mao chaired the committee and, through it, controlled the brigade.

In October 1942, the CGTB was expanded into the Central Guard Regiment. At the end of the Second World War, a third of the CGR was split off to create a protection unit for the CCP advance into Manchuria. In the following continuation of the Chinese Civil War, the CGR protected the Central Committee and PLA Headquarters. Mao exerted indirect control through Wang Dongxing, head of the Guard Bureau under the Central Secretariat.

The CCP's forces were reorganized in July 1949 with the security component becoming the Ministry of Public Security's (MPS) Chinese People's Public Security Forces (CPPSF), being renamed as the PLA Public Security Forces (PLAPSF) in September 1950. The Central Column of the CPPSF was created in August 1949 to protect the new capital of Beijing and the party leadership; in September 1949 the CGR was expanded into the 2nd Division of the Central Column. The reorganization was part of an effort to professionalize Chinese security forces by Nie Rongzhen and Luo Ruiqing, but it removed the CGR from Mao's influence and reduced Mao's influence in security; Luo was Minister of Public Security. Nie and Luo subsequently had poorer relationships with Mao.

=== Second formation ===
Mao created a new CGR in May 1953. The CGR was separating from the PLAPSF and subordinated to the party's CGB. Wang, leading the CGB, was again Mao's conduit of control. The PLA formally controlled the CGR, but in practice it only provided logistical and recruitment support. Similarly, while the CGB was simultaneously the MPS's 9th Bureau, in practice the MPS exercised no control. Therefore, Mao appointed commanders, and set recruiting criteria that favored poor or lower-middle-class peasants.

In 1959, Minister of National Defense Peng Dehuai, acting on a poor relationship with Mao, attempted to remove the CGR from Mao's control by subordinating it to the Beijing Garrison Command (BGC). It was unsuccessful because the CGR only drew logistical support. Peng was subsequently purged at the 1959 Lushan Conference, and the CGR was resubordinated to the PLA GSD in 1960. The PLA commanded the CGR for a few years while Wang attended the Central Party School and served as Jiangxi's deputy governor.

Mao strengthened his control over security in preparation for the Cultural Revolution, which included placing Wang in greater positions of authority. In September 1960, Wang was transferred back to Beijing to lead a purge of the CGB and CGR; in April 1964, he took over the MPS' 9th Bureau and managed its merger with the 8th Bureau which saw opponents dismissed and the CGB and CGR come under control of the 9th Bureau. (Note: The 9th Bureau provided security for the highest-ranked officials, including Mao, while the 8th provided security to other high ranked officials.) On the eve of the Cultural Revolution, Mao directly controlled the CGB, and through it the CGR and BGC, which he used to arrest and spy on his opponents. Mao fostered the CGR's loyalty by providing social and economic assistance to its members and their families, and - before 1969 - personally meeting new recruits.

=== The Cultural Revolution ===
During the Cultural Revolution, the CGR acted as Mao's representatives and communication intermediaries. CGR units were stationed to restore order at the "six factories and two universities" in Beijing which Mao regarded as "models". The CGR's prestige, derived from their close association with Mao, allowed their mere presence to pacify the mass rebels; Zhou Enlai sent officials to shelter in areas under CGR influence. The CGR and CGB established close ties with various politicians and groups, including Lin Biao, seeking to ensure their access to Mao; Mao proceeded to "rectify" the loyalty of his security force after coming into conflict with Lin at the 1970 Lushan plenum.

Mao's death in September 1976 instigated a power struggle within the CCP between the radical Gang of Four and the moderates. Wang was the most powerful person in the party's security and intelligence organization and retained control of the CGR and CGB; he adhered to Mao's views and allied with the moderates, allowing the moderates to control the party's elite security forces: the BGC, CGR and CGB. The Gang of Four were suppressed in October 1976; the CGR arrested the Gang, and the BGC arrested followers and took over the media.

The CGR was reorganized into the Central Guard Division in 1977.

=== Leadership changes after Mao ===
Deng Xiaoping returned to office in 1977 and moved to assert control over the security apparatus. At the Third Plenum of the 11th party congress in December 1978, Wang agreed to relinquish control over the CGO, CGB, and CGR for a mostly symbolic party vice chairmanship; Wang had previously refused to ally with Deng. Sun Yong, Deng's chief bodyguard and possibly one of Wang's old political rivals, became the CGR's new commander. In addition, the Third Plenum reduced the influence of Wang and his supporters by separating the CGB and CGR from the CGO; this put party security forces solely under the control of the Deng-controlled PLA GSD. Finally, the CGO, CGB, and CGR were purged of Wang's supporters.

== Leaders ==
=== Commanders ===
Name (English)	Name (Chinese)	Tenure begins	Tenure ends	Note
Zhang Yaoci	张耀祠	1953	1977	
Zhang Suizhi	张随枝	1977	1982	
Sun Yong	孙勇	1982	1994	
You Xigui	由喜贵	1994	2007	

=== Political Commissars ===
Name (English)	Name (Chinese)	Tenure begins	Tenure ends	Note
Yang Dezhong	杨德中	1953	1974	
Wu Jianhua	武健华	1974	1979	
Zhai Ruchang	翟入常	2010	2014	
Zou Shilong	邹石龙	2014		
