= Sun Yong =

Chinese military personnel (1926–2022)

- 孙勇

Commander of the Central Guard Regiment
- In office 1982–1994
- Preceded by: Zhang Suizhi (张随枝)
- Succeeded by: You Xigui

Personal details
- Born: 1926 Dacheng County, Zhili, China
- Died: 2022 (aged 95–96) Beijing, China
- Party: Chinese Communist Party

Military service
- Allegiance: People's Republic of China
- Branch/service: People's Liberation Army Ground Force
- Years of service: 1938–1994
- Rank: Lieutenant general

Chinese name
- Simplified Chinese: 孙勇
- Traditional Chinese: 孫勇
Transcriptions
Standard Mandarin
- Hanyu Pinyin: Sūn Yǒng

Sun Yong (Chinese: 孙勇; 1926 – 13 October 2022) was a lieutenant general in the People's Liberation Army of China who served as commander of the Central Guard Regiment from 1982 to 1994. He was a representative of the 12th, 13th, and 14th National Congress of the Chinese Communist Party. He was a member of the 8th National Committee of the Chinese People's Political Consultative Conference.

== Biography ==
Sun was born in Dacheng County, Zhili (now Hebei), in 1926. He joined the Eighth Route Army in August 1938 and joined the Chinese Communist Party (CCP) in October 1945. During the Chinese Civil War, he served as a security guard of Mao Zedong and Zhu De. In 1978, he became a security guard of Deng Xiaoping. In 1982, he was promoted to commander of the Central Guard Regiment, and served until 1994.

Sun was promoted to the rank of major general (shaojiang) in 1988 and lieutenant general (zhongjiang) in 1991.

On 13 October 2022, Sun died in Beijing, at the age of 96.

== Publications ==
- 在毛主席身边二十年 [Twenty years by Chairman Mao's Side] (in Chinese). Beijing: Central Party Literature Press. 2010. ISBN 9787507329575.
- 在小平同志身边二十年 [Twenty years by Comrade Xiaoping's Side] (in Chinese). Beijing: Central Party Literature Press. 2014. ISBN 9787507341188.

Military offices
Preceded by Zhang Suizhi (张随枝)	Commander of the Central Guard Regiment; 1982–1994	Succeeded by You Xigui
