= School district houses in China =

School district houses are houses within a school district in China that allow students free admission to the nearest school. Students who take advantage of school district houses can enter the nearest school without exams.

School district houses were first created in 1995 when China's laws were changed to prevent prestigious schools from enrolling students from far away areas, mainly based on donations to the school. This initiative was planned to help improve less popular schools. However, the actual outcome was that the price of housing around better schools increased; thereby, creating inequality of a different sort. Those who can afford it will often pay higher prices for housing in the hope of securing better opportunities for their children.

== Background ==
Since the 1990s, the educational benefits of certain schools attracted many parents to pay large sums of money or use social resources to enroll their children. Some schools run their subject training institutions for primary school students or cooperate with social institutions. They select outstanding students to enter their junior high school from the subject training institutions. To increase the probability of being admitted to these key secondary schools, parents often enroll their children in training courses that are designated or closely related to the schools. The policy of “nearby enrollment” was enacted to equalize the opportunities for students to enter schools, narrow the gap between key schools and weaker schools, as well as promote the balanced development of compulsory education.

However, the promulgation of “nearby enrollment” led to the emergence of “school district houses.” If a school-age child's household registration is in a good school district, they can enter a school offering an education of good quality. But the opposite also occurs: if a child is in a school district with schools offering a poor quality of education, they will only be permitted to go to one of these schools.

As a result, since the promulgation of this policy, many families have chosen to purchase real estate in communities or neighborhoods with reputable schools to ensure that the best quality education is provided for their children. They do this regardless of the costs, so long as they achieve their goal of obtaining a household registration that meets the policy of “nearby enrollment”.

== History ==
In 1962, China's Ministry of Education issued the “Notice on the Successful Implementation of a number of Full-time Primary and Secondary Schools”. The notice requires several key primary and secondary schools to be selected from all over the country. The quantity and scale of these schools should be matched with the enrollment of higher-level schools, so as to deliver talents for higher education. Besides, they also should concentrate on running a number of “top-notch” schools.

In 1983, the Ministry of Education issued the “Opinions on Further Improving the Quality of General Secondary Education”. It mentioned the method of improving junior high school enrollment, in order to liberate primary school students from excessive pressure.

In 1992, the State Education Commission promulgated the “Detailed Rules for the Implementation of the Compulsory Education Law”. The Article 26 of its fifth chapter stipulates: “The implementation of compulsory education schools shall be planned and rationalized by the municipal or county-level people's government in the district. The setting of primary schools should be beneficial for school-age children and teenagers to enter the school nearby.” “Nearby enrollment” aims to regulate the government's implementation of compulsory education. As for children, “nearby enrollment” is a kind of right granted to them by law.

In 1993, primary schools achieved “nearby enrollment”. However, the implementation had not been fully achieved in junior high schools because the entrance examination for junior high schools remained. Under this background, in 1993, the State Council promulgated the “Outline of China's Education Reform and Development”. It proposed to establish the nearby enrollment for primary school graduates, the entrance examination for junior high school graduates, the high school graduation exam, the entrance examination and examination system for the college entrance examination.

In 1995, the State Education Commission promulgated the “Implementation Opinions on Governing the Unreasonable Charges in Primary and Secondary Schools”. It clearly stated that in the nine-year compulsory education stage, primary schools and junior high schools must adhere to the principle of “nearby enrollment”, and it is not allowed to enroll in “the students through the choice of school”. In addition, it is strictly forbidden to link donated funds to the enrollment of students. The opinion pointed out that the fundamental measures to solve the problem of school selection and unreasonable charging are to speed up the adjustment of school layout and attach importance to the construction of weak schools. These measures can narrow the gap between schools and thus implement the policy of “nearby enrollment” in a fundamental sense. Since then, in the stipulations of the various policy documents issued by the Ministry of Education, the principle of “free admission to the nearest school” in the primary school and junior high school has been repeatedly mentioned and emphasized.

On June 29, 2006, at the 22nd meeting of the Standing Committee of the 10th National People's Congress, the revised “Compulsory Education Law of the People's Republic of China” further restricts the “nearby”. Its Article 12 stipulated that local people's governments at all levels shall guarantee that school-age children and adolescents are enrolled in schools near the place where they are registered. As a result, school education not only associates with the housing location, but also closely links with the housing property rights and household registration.

On January 28, 2014, the General Office of the Ministry of Education issued the “Notice on Further Improving the Free Admission to the Nearest School of Compulsory Education in Key Cities”. It emphasized that four municipalities directly under the central government, five municipalities with independent planning status, and 10 deputy provincial capital cities should formulate a plan to further standardize “free admission to the nearest school” of compulsory education in the next year.

== Economic consequences ==
Generally, there has been a rise in real estate prices because of the "nearby enrollment" policy. Many developers and agents strongly promote the surrounding schools or even directly bring in the famous schools to increase the value of the neighborhood.

School district houses have become the leading force in shaping the rise and fall of house prices. When there is a downturn in the real estate market, school district houses are central to holding up house prices and preventing public opinion from falling. The housing price of school district houses has become an indicator for the reasonableness of housing prices and an important support point for the real estate market.
