= Zhou Hongxu =

Chinese politician

- 周洪许

Director of the Central Guard Bureau
- Incumbent
- Assumed office 2021
- Succeeded by: Wang Shaojun

Deputy Director of the General Office of the Chinese Communist Party
- Incumbent
- Assumed office 2021

Personal details
- Born: 1971 (age 54–55) Chongqing, China
- Party: Chinese Communist Party
- Education: PLA Artillery Academy

Military service
- Rank: Major general

Zhou Hongxu (Chinese: 周洪许; pinyin: Zhōu Hóngxǔ; born 1971) is a Chinese politician who has served as the director of the Central Guard Bureau since 2021. He also serves as deputy director of the General Office of the Chinese Communist Party. He is a major general of the People's Liberation Army.

== Biography ==
Zhou Hongxu was born in Chongqing in 1971. He holds a master's degree from the People's Liberation Army Artillery Academy.

Zhou has served as the commander of the artillery regiment of the 40th Division of the 14th Army. He was also the director of the Military Training Department of the Chengdu Military Region Headquarters and the deputy chief of staff of the Northern Theater Command. He holds the rank of major general within the People's Liberation Army.

=== Central Guard Bureau ===
Zhou became the director of the Central Guard Bureau in 2021. He also serves as the deputy director of the General Office of the Chinese Communist Party. In 2022, he was elected as a delegate to the 20th National Congress of the Chinese Communist Party.

Zhou has accompanied Xi Jinping to international visits, such as the 2022 G20 Bali summit, APEC United States 2023, the 18th BRICS summit in India in 2026, and 2026 state visit by Xi to the United States.
