= Xigui =

Xigui can refer to:

- Du Xigui (Chinese: 杜錫珪), Chinese admiral
- Qiu Xigui (Chinese: 裘锡圭; 1935–2025), Chinese historian
- You Xigui (Chinese: 由喜贵), Chinese general
