= Wang Dongxing =

Chinese general and politician (1916–2015)

- 汪东兴
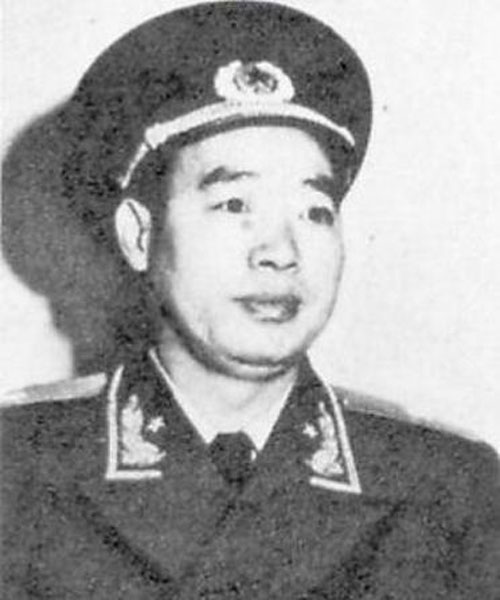
- Wang Dongxing in 1955, as chief of Mao's personal security force

Vice Chairman of the Chinese Communist Party
- In office August 1977 – February 1980
- Chairman: Hua Guofeng

Personal details
- Born: 9 January 1916 Yiyang County, Jiangxi, China
- Died: 21 August 2015 (aged 99) Beijing, China
- Party: Chinese Communist Party

Chinese name
- Traditional Chinese: 汪東興
- Simplified Chinese: 汪东兴
Transcriptions
Standard Mandarin
- Hanyu Pinyin: Wāng Dōngxìng
- Wade–Giles: Wang^{1} Tung^{1}-hsing^{4}

Wang Dongxing (Chinese: 汪东兴; pinyin: Wāng Dōngxìng; Wade–Giles: Wang^{1} Tung^{1}-hsing^{4}; 9 January 1916 – 21 August 2015) was a Chinese military commander and politician, famous for being the chief of Mao Zedong's personal bodyguard force, the 9th Bureau of the Ministry of Public Security (which included the 8341 Special Regiment). Wang held many important positions, both in the Chinese Communist Party (CCP) and the government; he was Deputy Minister of Public Security in 1955–1958 and again in 1960–1970 and notably served as CCP Vice Chairman from 1977 to 1980, under Chairman Hua Guofeng.

Wang and his trusted security force played a very significant role in ending the Cultural Revolution by arresting the Gang of Four; however, Wang opposed Deng Xiaoping's proposed changes in economic policy, remaining loyal to Hua Guofeng and the continuation of the Maoist political line. As a result, when Deng consolidated power, he removed Wang from his government and Party posts, but did not harm him any further.

== Early life and military service ==
Wang was born to a peasant family in Yiyang County, Jiangxi on 9 January 1916. He joined the Communist Youth League of China in 1932, and the Chinese Red Army (the predecessor of the People's Liberation Army) in 1933, at the age of 17. He received military and political training at the Pengyang Infantry School and later at the Anti-Japanese Military and Political University. In 1934-35 he took part in the Long March, accompanying Mao to Yan'an. He later fought as an infantry officer in the war against Japan, and, after the defeat of the Japanese, in the Chinese Civil War, which led to the establishment of the People's Republic of China in 1949.

== Mao's chief of security ==
With the creation of the new Communist government, Wang Dongxing was named deputy director of the General Office of the Chinese Communist Party (an important bureaucratic position dealing with administration and personnel) and, crucially, Director of the 9th Bureau of the Ministry of Public Security, in charge of Mao Zedong's personal security detail, and also of protecting Zhongnanhai, the seat of government power. The 9th Bureau included the 8341 Special Regiment. Wang and his men were the only ones allowed to carry weapons inside Zhongnanhai. Mao trusted Wang, and made him responsible for checking the background of all staff serving in Zhongnanhai (not only bodyguards, but also waiters, cooks, secretaries etc.)

Mao's continued trust and support led to Wang becoming, in 1955, Deputy Minister of Public Security, under Minister Luo Ruiqing. For "his efforts in public security work", Wang was awarded the rank of Major General of the Chinese People's Liberation Army, also in 1955.

In June 1958 Mao suddenly demoted Wang, sending him to Jiangxi as Director of the Provincial Land Reclamation Department. From February 1959 to August 1960, Wang served as member of the Standing Committee of the Communist Party Jiangxi Provincial Committee, and as vice president and Party Secretary of the Communist Labor University of Jiangxi.

However, in August 1960, Mao decided to recall Wang back to Beijing, and named him, again, chief of his bodyguards and Deputy Minister of Public Security, under Minister Xie Fuzhi (Xie was also very loyal to Mao). Throughout the chaos and instability of the Cultural Revolution, Wang remained a loyal and effective associate of Mao, although he couldn't prevent the Red Guards from denouncing and attacking many security officers of the Ministry of Public Security (Minister Xie explicitly allowed and even encouraged his favored Red Guard factions to attack security officials loyal to his predecessor Luo Ruiqing).

In 1966, at the start of the Cultural Revolution, Wang Dongxing was often seen in the great Red Guard rallies, sitting next to Mao's chauffeur in the open-top car from which Mao reviewed his supporters.

== Arresting the Gang of Four and prominence under Hua Guofeng ==
Wang was instrumental in the coup d'état against the Gang of Four immediately after Mao's death. On orders from Hua Guofeng (Mao's designated successor) he assembled a group of trusted officers, made them swear an oath of loyalty and secrecy, and instructed them to "shoot to kill" if there was any armed resistance.

In the event, no blood was shed: Jiang Qing's three close associates (Zhang Chunqiao, Yao Wenyuan and Wang Hongwen) were quickly and easily arrested after being lured to a high-level meeting in Zhongnanhai, ostensibly to discuss the building of Mao's Mausoleum and the publication of his latest works. Jiang herself was seized separately, again with no resistance.

Wang Dongxing was prominent under Chairman Hua Guofeng, being named Vice Chairman of the Chinese Communist Party and one of the five members of the Politburo Standing Committee, a committee whose membership varies between 5 and 11 and includes the top leadership of the Chinese Communist Party.

== Later years ==
Wang Dongxing and his patron Hua Guofeng were gradually outmaneuvered by Deng Xiaoping who rose to supreme power and were deprived of all their important government and Party posts in the early 1980s.

However, as a gesture both to Wang's role as personal protector of Mao, and also to signal that political foes would no longer be persecuted, Wang was elected to the last alternate position of the CPC Central Committee at the 12th National Congress, in 1982.

After Mao's death, Wang remained a constant supporter of the chairman's memory, always visiting the mausoleum in Tiananmen Square with flowers on Mao's birthday, and also published a diary in 1993 to commemorate the 100th anniversary of Mao's birth.

In 2011 he complained that Chinese socialism was in retreat, and that everyone was now "fixated on getting money". No Chinese political leader would have dared talk publicly in such a way, but Wang remained wedded to his early beliefs (thus becoming a champion of the Chinese New Left), declaring himself "a loyal soldier of Chairman Mao to the end".

Wang died on 21 August 2015 in Beijing at the age of 99.

== See also ==
- Wu De
- Ji Dengkui
