= Ji Dengkui =

Chinese political figure

- 纪登奎
- Dengkui in 1969

Vice Premier of China
- In office 1975–1978
- Premier: Zhou Enlai; Hua Guofeng

Personal details
- Born: 17 March 1923 Wuxiang County, Shanxi, China
- Died: 13 July 1988 (aged 65)
- Party: Chinese Communist Party

Ji Dengkui
- Traditional Chinese: 紀登奎
- Simplified Chinese: 纪登奎
Transcriptions
Standard Mandarin
- Hanyu Pinyin: Jǐ Dēngkuí
- Wade–Giles: Chi Teng-k'ui

Ji Dengkui (Chinese: 纪登奎; 17 March 1923 – 13 July 1988) was a Chinese political figure during the Cultural Revolution. He was a member of the 10th and 11th Politburos of the Communist Party and was a protégé of Mao Zedong in Mao's later years. He served in a number of important government and military posts, including member of the Central Military Commission, Political Commissar of the Beijing Military Region, and Vice Premier of the State Council. After Mao's death in 1976, he supported Mao's designated successor, Hua Guofeng, in purging the Gang of Four. Two years later, Deng Xiaoping ousted Hua from his leadership position, and Ji, labelled the "Little Gang of Four" together with other prominent Hua supporters, was forced out of politics.

== Early life ==
Ji Dengkui was born in Wuxiang County, Shanxi province on 17 March 1923. After the eruption of the Second Sino-Japanese War in 1937, he joined the anti-Japanese resistance before turning 15, and the Chinese Communist Party the following year. During the Anti-Japanese War and the subsequent Chinese Civil War, he served in various party positions including Party Secretary of Lushan County in Henan province. Although he participated in some battles during the wars, he frankly admitted that he had little military experience, even after Mao Zedong appointed him to top military posts of China in the 1970s.

== Early People's Republic ==
After Mao's Communist Party won the Civil War and established the People's Republic of China in 1949, Ji continued to serve as a local party official in Henan. In 1951, Ji met Mao for the first time during Mao's tour of Henan. Ji, then Deputy Party Secretary of Xuchang prefecture, reportedly gained the favour of Mao by giving straightforward answers to Mao's questions, and frankly admitted that he had killed innocent people by mistake during the Communist Revolution. Mao praised his work and Ji was soon promoted to Party Secretary of Xuchang, at the age of only 28.

Ji worked at Luoyang Mining Equipment Factory, which was built in the mid-1950s as one of the key industrial projects which the USSR helped build during China's First Five-Year Plan.

He served as the Party Secretary of Luoyang prefecture during the Great Leap Forward (1958 to 1961), and avoided implementing the catastrophic policies of other local leaders which caused extensive famine in Henan, especially in Xinyang prefecture. Few people died of hunger in Luoyang, while more than a million people starved to death in the infamous "Xinyang Incident".

Mao Zedong visited Henan more than ten times before the start of the Cultural Revolution, and summoned Ji Dengkui for reporting whenever he was in the province. Although Mao was 30 years older than Ji, he publicly referred to Ji as his "old friend". Ji rose quickly within the party ranks, first to the provincial party committee as an alternate party secretary, and later to the national government.

== Cultural Revolution ==
When the Cultural Revolution erupted in 1966, Ji was a deputy director of the Henan Cultural Revolution Group (under the Hunan Provincial Committee of the CCP), effectively the deputy head of the provincial government. When the January Storm swept through China in January 1967, China fell into anarchy and the radical Rebel Faction (Zaofanpai 造反派) of the Red Guards took over many local governments, including that of Henan. Ji was persecuted and imprisoned by the Rebels for six months, and endured numerous struggle sessions. In July 1967, however, Ji was released and restored as the deputy director of the Henan Revolutionary Committee, and the de facto top leader in Henan. His release was announced after a visit to Henan from representatives of the central government, and was believed to be partly due to his relationship with Mao.

In 1969, Ji was designated by Mao to speak as a representative of the "revolutionary cadres" at the 9th Congress of the Chinese Communist Party, at which he was elected a member of the Central Committee. Soon afterward he was elected an alternate member of the Politburo, catapulting him into the ranks of national leaders.

As one of Mao's loyal supporters, Ji became a member of the Central Military Commission in September 1970 as part of Mao's strategy to "mix the sand" by inserting officials loyal to him into the ranks of Lin Biao's military staff to keep a check on Lin. He was also appointed Political Commissar of the crucial Beijing Military Region.

After Lin Biao's death in a 1971 plane crash, Ji was elected a full member of the 10th Politburo in 1973, and became Vice-Premier in January 1975.

== After the Cultural Revolution ==
After Mao died in 1976, Ji supported Mao's designated successor Hua Guofeng, and helped Hua purge the Gang of Four, including Mao's widow Jiang Qing, from the CCP leadership. He was instrumental in taking over the influential newspaper Guangming Daily, which had been controlled by the Gang of Four. In 1977, he was re-elected a full member of the 11th Politburo.

Ji was a member of the "Whatever Faction" that allied with Hua Guofeng, who was eventually to be outmaneuvered by Deng Xiaoping to resign from the highest command of party leadership. Leading up to the watershed events in 1978, Ji had served as the Executive Vice Premier of the Council in charge of agriculture. Although initially playing a key role in setting the agenda and drafting documents on agricultural development, Ji quickly found himself subject to criticisms from all sides for "mistakes" he made during the Cultural Revolution at the Third Plenum of the Eleventh Party Congress in 1978. Taken over from Hua Guofeng by Chen Yun and Hu Yaobang, the subsequent discussion sessions turned to the historical cases of Liu Shaoqi, Peng Dehuai, Tao Zhu, and Bo Yibo. According to Yu Guangyuan, who was in the same Northwest Group at the Conference, Ji remained noticeably passive throughout these sessions. "Among the 35 members in northwest group," recounts Yu, "34 of them spoke actively." Ji was also named, after his fellow Vice Premier Wang Dongxing was criticized by Hu Yaobang and Yu Guangyuan's reformist camp. Eventually, Ji Dengkui, Wang Dongxing, Wu De, and Chen Xilian, the four high-ranking allies of Hua, were labelled the "Little Gang of Four" and dismissed from the most important of their political posts. Although the decision was made in 1978, it was not made public until February 1980, at the Fifth Plenum of the Party Congress.

Ji was reassigned a researcher at the Research Center of Rural Development in China in 1982. He died of an illness on 13 July 1988, at the age of 65.
