= Secretariat of the General Office of the Chinese Communist Party =

Secretariat of the General Office of the Central Committee of the Chinese Communist Party
- 中共中央办公厅秘书局
- Type: Department of the General Office of the Chinese Communist Party
- Headquarters: No. 12, Fuyou Street, Xicheng District, Beijing
- Director: Kong Shaoxun
- Parent organization: General Office of the Chinese Communist Party

Secretariat of the General Office of the Central Committee of the Chinese Communist Party
- Simplified Chinese: 中共中央办公厅秘书局
- Traditional Chinese: 中共中央辦公廳秘書局
Transcriptions
Standard Mandarin
- Hanyu Pinyin: Zhōnggòng Zhōngyāng Bàngōngtīng Mìshūjú

The Secretariat of the General Office of the Central Committee of the Chinese Communist Party is an internal agency of the General Office of the Chinese Communist Party, responsible for secretarial work.

== History ==
In 1955, the Secretariat of the General Office of the CCP Central Committee was abolished and the Secretariat of the General Office of the CCP Central Committee was established. It was later abolished.

In May 1966, the Political Bureau of the CCP Central Committee held an enlarged meeting to criticize the "anti-party mistakes" of Peng Zhen, Luo Ruiqing, Lu Dingyi and Yang Shangkun, and decided to suspend and dismiss them from their posts. On May 22, 1966, the General Office of the CCP Central Committee (hereinafter referred to as the "General Office") held a "cover-up meeting" to convey the " May 16 Notice " and called for the exposure of Yang Shangkun's "anti-party mistakes". On June 18, 1966, the General Office of the CCP Central Committee announced the establishment of the Secretariat of the General Office of the CCP Central Committee, which was divided into the Document and Telegraph Office, the Letters and Visits Office, and the Research Office. The original confidential office, secretariat, and research office (i.e., the Research Office of the CCP Central Secretariat) were abolished. Most of the staff who had worked in the back building of the Ju Rendang in Zhongnanhai were ordered to move out of Zhongnanhai. On July 15, 1966, they were sent to the study class of the General Office of the CCP Central Committee. Since then, most of them have been investigated for ten years. Later, the Secretariat of the General Office of the CCP Central Committee has continued to exist to this day.

== Functions ==
The Secretariat is mainly responsible for information integration, supervision and inspection, text integration, document processing, file distribution, archive management, and library and information services.

In the 1980s, Li Xin, executive deputy director of the Secretariat, proposed that the basic content of secretarial work was “handling documents, organizing meetings, and handling affairs.” The Secretariat also had a comprehensive research department that was responsible for editing relevant information publications and emergency information duty, etc.

The Secretariat edits and publishes "Central Office Newsletter" and "Secretarial Work". "Central Office Newsletter" is an internal publication approved by the CCP Central Committee and sponsored by the General Office of the CCP Central Committee. It is aimed at party organizations and party members at all levels. It is an extension and supplement to the relevant documents of the Central Committee. It regularly publishes the central documents that have been publicly issued and the important speeches of the central leaders of the period. "Secretarial Work" is a national secretarial work business guidance publication under the supervision of the Secretariat of the General Office of the CCP Central Committee. It is the only national secretarial work business guidance publication in the party and government general office (department) system.

== Organizational structure ==
=== Internal organization ===
- Administrative Office
- Office of Documentation
- Conference Room
- Information Comprehensive Room
- Comprehensive Research Office
- Archives and Library
- Audiovisual Room

=== Directly affiliated institutions ===
- "Secretarial Work" Magazine
- Editorial Department of the General Office of the CCP Central Committee

== Leaders ==
=== Secretary's Office of the General Office of the CCP Central Committee ===
==== Director ====
- He Zai (1956–1957, head)
- Wang Gang (1957-?, person in charge)
- Tian Jiaying (? - May 1966, deputy director of the General Office of the CCP Central Committee)

==== Deputy Director ====
- Chen Bingchen (1956–1966)
