= Special Accounting Office of the General Office of the Chinese Communist Party =

Special Accounting Office of the General Office of the Central Committee of the Chinese Communist Party
- 中共中央办公厅特别会计室
- Type: Department of the General Office of the Chinese Communist Party
- Headquarters: No. 14, Fuyou Street, Xicheng District, Beijing
- Director: Ma Yueli
- Parent organization: General Office of the Chinese Communist Party

General Office of the Central Committee of the Chinese Communist Party
- Simplified Chinese: 中共中央办公厅特别会计室
- Traditional Chinese: 中共中央辦公廳特別會計室
Transcriptions
Standard Mandarin
- Hanyu Pinyin: Zhōnggòng Zhōngyāng Bàngōngtīng Tèbié Kuàijìshì

The Special Accounting Office of the General Office of the Central Committee of the Chinese Communist Party is an internal agency of the General Office of the Chinese Communist Party, responsible for special accounting work.

== History ==
In 1941, during the Anti-Japanese War, the CCP Central Committee, under the strict blockade of the Kuomintang, called on all units to establish their own "household affairs" in the face of economic difficulties both at home and abroad. As a result, all units reclaimed wasteland to grow grain, spun yarn and wove cloth, and drew out funds and manpower to do business in the Kuomintang-controlled areas and even in Hong Kong, thus accumulating a lot of funds for the party. In September 1941, in order to unify the management of these special funds, the CCP Central Committee decided to establish the Special Accounting Section of the Secretariat of the CCP Central Committee (hereinafter referred to as the Special Accounting Section), and clearly stated that the Special Accounting Section was mainly responsible for managing the funds for the activities of the CCP underground party, foreign aid funds and all funds required for the central conference. At that time, the main sources of funds for the Special Accounting Section included: (1) the money earned by the party's secret enterprises (party member enterprises); (2) gold handed over by various central bureaus (because the currencies of the liberated areas were not unified at that time, only gold could be handed over); (3) spoils of war; (4) party dues collected uniformly by the Central Committee and various central bureaus; (5) donations from overseas patriots and overseas Chinese during the Anti-Japanese War. The director of the Special Accounting Section was Lai Zulie, who was directly under the leadership of Ren Bishi.

In March 1948, the Central Front Committee and the Central Rear Committee began to move to Xibaipo, Pingshan County, Hebei Province. This transfer passed through more than 20 counties in Shaanxi Province, Shanxi Province, and Hebei Province. After arriving in Xibaipo, the Special Meeting Section of the Central Secretariat was arranged in a large earthen shed between the entrances of East and West Baipo villages. At that time, the party's special funds and personnel were all in the shed. Valuable items were stored in three caves. The easternmost cave stored antiques such as gems and ivory, the middle cave had a safe, which stored important money and account books, and the western cave stored gold shipped from northern Shaanxi. These special funds of the party played an important role at critical moments. For example, in June 1946, the New Fourth Army Fifth Division led by Li Xiannian, with more than 60,000 soldiers, was besieged by more than 300,000 Kuomintang troops in Xuanhuadian, Hubei Province. The central leadership instructed the Special Meeting Section to quickly prepare legal currency and US dollars, which were later airdropped to the Fifth Division's base, alleviating the Fifth Division's economic difficulties. In the summer of 1946, the Nationalist government returned to Nanjing, and the Eighth Route Army's Chongqing Office also moved to Nanjing. It also set up an office in Shanghai and founded newspapers in Beijing, Tianjin, and Shanghai. All of these used the Party's special funds. Mao Zedong instructed that the funds should be spent economically and should not be used under normal circumstances.

At the Politburo meeting of the CCP Central Committee in early January 1949, Mao Zedong clearly proposed that it was better not to have special funds for the Party. The CCP Central Committee decided that the Party would no longer engage in trade and commercial activities. In March 1949, the CCP Central Committee and the headquarters of the Chinese People's Liberation Army moved from Xibaipo to Beiping. In order to ensure the safety of the Party's special funds, the Special Meeting Section did not go to Beijing with the Central Committee, but left Xibaipo for Beiping at the end of March 1949, using seven trucks. All the Party's special funds were put into the underground warehouse of the People's Bank of China. After entering Beijing, the Party's special funds completed their tasks and were dealt with separately: for example, a group of shops and cinemas operated by Deng Jie in Beiping and the gold mine planned to be excavated in Miyun were all transferred to Beiping City; the gold bars and silver dollars left by Lai Zulie when doing business in Beiping, and several ancient seals stored in the safe of the Bank of China in Dongjiaomin Lane were sold at a discount to the People's Bank of China, and the money was kept in the Special Meeting Section; China Resources Company and Wufeng Commercial Bank in Hong Kong could only be managed by the CCP Hong Kong Working Committee because Hong Kong was still controlled by Britain. After the above treatment, all parts of the party's special funds related to commerce were removed. The special meeting section only kept the proceeds from discounted sales, party dues paid by party members, and Mao Zedong's royalties.

Subsequently, the Special Meeting Section was incorporated into the General Office of the CCP Central Committee (hereinafter referred to as the General Office), and renamed the Special Accounting Office of the General Office of the CCP Central Committee, which was directly led by Yang Shangkun. Until before the Cultural Revolution, the General Office of the CCP Central Committee had always had a Special Accounting Office. The Special Accounting Office was responsible for managing the special funds of the CCP Central Committee and coordinating the use of funds of party organizations across the country, and was directly under the leadership of the Standing Committee of the Political Bureau of the CCP Central Committee. The personal royalties of Mao Zedong, Chairman of the CCP Central Committee, were also deposited in a bank by the Special Accounting Office for safekeeping. Mao Zedong mainly used the royalties to buy books, run schools, conduct investigations and research, support his staff, entertain and give gifts to democratic parties and non-party members, return items requested by his staff and his wife Jiang Qing from local units, and buy medicine for his ex-wife He Zizhen. Mao Zedong used less than 10,000 yuan of royalties each year. In his later years, he gave Jiang Qing 30,000 yuan from his royalties, and in 1975 he gave He Zizhen 20,000 yuan, and Mao Anqing and Li Na 8,000 yuan each. After Mao Zedong's death in September 1976, his royalties remained untouched for many years until the General Office of the CCP Central Committee found Li Min in 1981 and gave her 8,000 yuan from his royalties, as well as a refrigerator and a color TV. They also gave Li Na a refrigerator and a color TV. The remaining royalties were still kept and managed by the Special Accounting Office. The savings of some central leaders were also kept in the Special Accounting Office. For example, Zhu De kept his savings since he was paid in the Special Accounting Office. On January 15, 1977, his widow Kang Keqing wrote to Wang Dongxing, director of the General Office of the CCP Central Committee, asking him to hand over the entire 20,306.16 yuan savings to the Party organization in accordance with his will. The Special Accounting Office soon sent Kang Keqing a receipt.

After the outbreak of the Cultural Revolution, the organization of the General Office of the CCP Central Committee was in disarray and its work was disrupted. After May 1969, the business of the Special Accounting Office of the General Office of the CCP Central Committee was transferred to the Financial Group of the Management Office of the General Office of the CCP Central Committee. In October 1976, the General Office of the CCP Central Committee had 12 departments (departments, libraries, and schools). In 1988, the General Office of the CCP Central Committee was reorganized and 12 bureau-level institutions were set up, including the Research Office, the Secretariat, the Security Bureau, the Confidential Bureau, the Confidential Transportation Bureau, the Central Administrative Bureau, the Central Archives, the Chairman Mao Memorial Hall Administration, the Special Accounting Office, the Veteran Cadre Bureau, the Personnel Bureau, and the Office of the Party Committee of the Central Committee. In December 1993, the General Office of the CCP Central Committee was reorganized and 12 bureau-level institutions were set up, including the Research Office, the Secretariat (of which the Legal Affairs Office is a deputy bureau-level institution located in the Secretariat), the Security Bureau, the Confidential Bureau, the Confidential Transportation Bureau, the Central Administrative Bureau, the Special Accounting Office, the Veteran Cadre Bureau, the Personnel Bureau, and the Party Committee of the Central Committee.

== Organizational structure ==
- Office
- Business Department I
- Business Division II
- Business Division III

== Leaders ==
=== Director ===
- Lai Zulie (? -?)
- Feng Lingan (? -?)
- Zhang Yubin (? - June 2014)
- Ma Yueli (January 2015 -)

=== Deputy Director ===
- Yang Jianping (1997–2000, promoted to bureau level in 2000)
- Chen Jiusong (March 2001 -?)
- Gu Aimin (? -?)
