= Confidential Transportation Bureau of the Chinese Communist Party =

Confidential Transportation Bureau of the General Office of the Central Committee of the Chinese Communist Party
- 中共中央办公厅机要交通局
- Type: Department of the General Office of the Chinese Communist Party
- Headquarters: No. 11, Xihuangchenggen North Street, Xicheng District, Beijing
- Parent organization: General Office of the Chinese Communist Party

Confidential Transportation Bureau of the General Office of the Central Committee of the Chinese Communist Party
- Simplified Chinese: 中共中央办公厅机要交通局
- Traditional Chinese: 中共中央辦公廳機要交通局
Transcriptions
Standard Mandarin
- Hanyu Pinyin: Zhōnggòng Zhōngyāng Bàngōngtīng Jīyào Jiāotōngjú

The Confidential Transportation Bureau of the General Office of the Central Committee of the Chinese Communist Party is an internal agency of the General Office of the Chinese Communist Party, responsible for confidential transportation work.

== History ==
When the People's Republic of China was founded, the General Office of the Central Committee had the following: the Central Confidential Bureau, the Political Secretary's Office of the Central Secretariat, the Special Accounting Office of the General Office, the Central Secretariat, the Central Confidential Office, the Central Security Office, and the Central Directly Affiliated Organs Supply Department. After that, the organization of the General Office underwent several changes. By 1965, the General Office had the Security Bureau, the Confidential Transportation Bureau, the Confidential Bureau, the Secretariat, the State Archives Bureau, the Central Archives, the Personnel Department, the Central Directly Affiliated Organs Affairs Management Bureau, and various groups directly under the General Office.

During the Cultural Revolution, after May 1969, the Secretariat, Security Bureau, Confidential Bureau, and Confidential Transportation Bureau were changed to the Secretariat, Security Department, Confidential Department, and Confidential Transportation Department respectively.

In October 1976, the General Office of the CCP Central Committee had 12 departments (departments, libraries, and schools). In 1988, the General Office of the CCP Central Committee underwent an institutional reform. After the adjustment, it had 12 bureau-level agencies, including the Research Office, the Secretariat, the Security Bureau, the Confidential Bureau, the Confidential Transportation Bureau, the Central Administrative Bureau, the Central Archives, the Chairman Mao Memorial Hall Administration, the Special Accounting Office, the Veteran Cadre Bureau, the Personnel Bureau, and the Office of the Party Committee of the Central Committee. In December 1993, the General Office of the CCP Central Committee underwent an institutional reform. After this adjustment, the General Office of the CCP Central Committee had one vice-ministerial agency (the Central Archives and the National Archives Administration), and 10 functional bureaus: the Research Office, the Secretariat (of which the Legal Affairs Office is a vice-bureau-level agency, located in the Secretariat), the Security Bureau, the Confidential Bureau, the Confidential Transportation Bureau, the Central Administrative Bureau, the Special Accounting Office, the Veteran Cadre Bureau, the Personnel Bureau, and the Office of the Party Committee of the Central Committee.

== Organizational structure ==
- Communications Office
- Transportation Department
- Science and Technology Department

== Leaders ==
=== Director ===
- Wang Kai (Wang Jingdong) (1957-?)
- Wang Zhenchuan (May 1989 - June 1993)
- Li Hong (? - 1998)
- Li Jianbo (September 2003 - March 2012)

=== Deputy Director ===
- Cheng Yuangong (1976–1979)
- Wu Xinghong (? -?, director-level)
- Li Hong (1994-?)
- Zhang Qian (? -?)
