= Departmental Affairs Management Bureaus =

Chinese Communist Party body

Departmental Affairs Management Bureaus of the Central Committee of the Chinese Communist Party
- 中共中央直属机关事务管理局
- Headquarters: No. 9, Xihuangchenggen North Street, Xicheng District, Beijing
- Director: Ji Zheng
- Parent organization: General Office of the Chinese Communist Party

Departmental Affairs Management Bureaus of the Central Committee of the Chinese Communist Party
- Simplified Chinese: 中共中央直属机关事务管理局
- Traditional Chinese: 中共中央直屬機關事務管理局
Transcriptions
Standard Mandarin
- Hanyu Pinyin: Zhōnggòng Zhōngyāng Zhíshǔ jīguān Shìwù Guǎnlǐjú

Alternative Chinese name
- Simplified Chinese: 中直管理局
- Traditional Chinese: 中直管理局
Transcriptions
Standard Mandarin
- Hanyu Pinyin: Zhōngzhí Guǎnlǐjú

The Departmental Affairs Management Bureaus of the Central Committee of the Chinese Communist Party is a subordinate unit of the General Office of the Chinese Communist Party and is the administrative agency for the central government offices. It is mainly responsible for the management, guarantee, and service of funds, materials, vehicles, real estate, infrastructure, housing, and property.

== History ==
During the Agrarian Revolution, the CCP generally managed the logistics of its organs through the military supply department, and did not set up a special organ logistics agency. In 1931, the Central Workers' and Peasants' Democratic Government established a General Affairs Office to manage logistics affairs, and also stipulated that general affairs departments should be established in the workers' and peasants' democratic governments at the provincial, county and district levels. During the Yan'an period, the logistics departments of the CCP Central Committee and the organs directly under the Central Military Commission (including the guard forces) were not strictly distinguished at first. In the early days of the Anti-Japanese War, the CCP Central Committee had a Central Administration Bureau, and the Central Military Commission had a Military Commission Logistics Supply Department. In 1942, they were merged into the Central Administration Bureau, and in 1945 they were renamed the Military Commission Supply Department.

After the founding of the People's Republic of China, in 1949, the department responsible for the financial supply and administrative affairs of the Central Committee of the Chinese Communist Party was renamed the Central Committee of the Chinese Communist Party Directly Affiliated Organs Supply Department (abbreviated as the Central Committee of the Chinese Communist Party Supply Department). In 1954, it was renamed the Central Committee of the Chinese Communist Party Directly Affiliated Organs Affairs Management Bureau. After that, the organization of the General Office of the Central Committee of the Chinese Communist Party (abbreviated as "General Office") changed several times. By 1965, the General Office of the Central Committee had the Security Bureau, the Confidential Transportation Bureau, the Confidential Bureau, the Secretariat, the State Archives Bureau, the Central Archives, the Personnel Department, the Central Committee of the Chinese Communist Party Directly Affiliated Organs Affairs Management Bureau and various groups directly under the General Office.

Before the Cultural Revolution, the General Office of the CCP Central Committee had the following organizational structure: Confidential Office, Secretary's Office, Directly Affiliated Groups, Special Accounting Office, Security Bureau, Confidential Bureau, Confidential Transportation Bureau, Personnel Department, State Archives Administration, Central Direct Administrative Bureau, and Central Archives. During the Cultural Revolution, after May 1969, the Secretariat, Security Bureau, Confidential Bureau, and Confidential Transportation Bureau were changed to Secretariat, Security Department, Confidential Department, and Confidential Transportation Department respectively; the Letters and Visits Office of the Secretariat was changed to the Letters and Visits Office of the General Office of the CCP Central Committee; the Central Direct Administrative Bureau was changed to the Management Department of the General Office of the CCP Central Committee; the business of the Special Accounting Office of the General Office of the CCP Central Committee was transferred to the Financial Group of the Management Department of the General Office of the CCP Central Committee; and the Ming and Qing Archives Department of the Central Archives of the CCP Central Committee was transferred to the Palace Museum.

In October 1976, the General Office of the CCP Central Committee had 12 departments (departments, libraries, and schools). Later, the General Office of the CCP Central Committee was re-established as the General Office of the CCP Central Committee. In 1988, the General Office of the CCP Central Committee underwent an organizational restructuring. After the restructuring, it had 12 bureau-level agencies, including the Research Office, the Secretariat, the Security Bureau, the Confidential Bureau, the Confidential Transportation Bureau, the Central Administration Bureau, the Central Archives, the Chairman Mao Memorial Hall Administration, the Special Accounting Office, the Veteran Cadre Bureau, the Personnel Bureau, and the General Office of the CCP Central Committee.

== Organizational structure ==
=== Internal organization ===
- Office
- Assets Division
- Personnel Department
- Policy and Regulations Department
- Service Reception Office
- Financial Management Office
- Administrative Office
- Accounting Management Office
- Infrastructure Investment Management Office
- Real Estate Management Office
- Logistics Reform and Business Guidance Office
- Wanshou Road Management Office
- Office of Population and Family Planning Commission of the CCP Central Committee
- Office of the Patriotic Health Campaign Committee of the Central Committee of the Chinese Communist Party
- Office of the Greening Committee of the Central Committee of the Chinese Communist Party
- Office of the Civilian Air Defense Committee of the Central Committee of the Chinese Communist Party
- Office of the Traffic Safety Committee of the Central Committee of the Chinese Communist Party
- Central Committee of the Chinese Communist Party Procurement Center
- Audit Office of the Central Committee of the Chinese Communist Party
- Beidaihe Service Bureau of the Central Committee of the Chinese Communist Party (Beidaihe Reception Office of the Central Committee of the Chinese Communist Party)
- Party Committee of the Office

=== Directly affiliated organizations ===
- Central Committee of the Chinese Communist Party Directly Affiliated Organs Engineering Construction Service Center (Deputy Bureau Level)
- Central Committee of the Chinese Communist Party Directly Affiliated Organs Property Service Center (Deputy Bureau Level)
- Housing Fund Management Center of Central Government Agencies
- Guesthouse of the Central Committee of the Chinese Communist Party (Beijing Jintai Hotel) (Deputy Bureau Level)
- Central Committee of the Chinese Communist Party Garden Management Office (Deputy Bureau Level)
- Central Committee of the Chinese Communist Party General Office Service Center (CCP Central Committee of the Chinese Communist Party General Office Service Bureau)
