= Personnel Bureau of the General Office of the Chinese Communist Party =

Internal agency of the Chinese Communist Party

Personnel Bureau of the General Office of the Central Committee of the Chinese Communist Party
- 中共中央办公厅人事局
- Type: Department of the General Office of the Chinese Communist Party
- Headquarters: No. 12, Fuyou Street , Xicheng District, Beijing
- Director: Kong Shaoxun
- Parent organization: General Office of the Chinese Communist Party

Personnel Bureau of the General Office of the Central Committee of the Chinese Communist Party
- Simplified Chinese: 中共中央办公厅人事局
- Traditional Chinese: 中共中央辦公廳人事局
Transcriptions
Standard Mandarin
- Hanyu Pinyin: Zhōnggòng Zhōngyāng Bàngōngtīng Rénshìjú

The Personnel Bureau of the General Office of the Central Committee of the Chinese Communist Party is an internal agency of the General Office of the Chinese Communist Party. It is a joint office with the Party Committee of the General Office of the CCP Central Committee.

== History ==
Before the Cultural Revolution, the General Office of the CCP Central Committee (hereinafter referred to as the General Office) had a Personnel Department. On August 20, 1966, the Political Department of the General Office was established, and the Personnel Department was abolished. Its personnel affairs were incorporated into the Organization Group of the Political Department. In October 1976, the General Office had 12 departments (departments, libraries, and schools). In 1988, the General Office was reorganized and had 12 bureau-level departments, including the Research Office, the Secretariat, the Security Bureau, the Confidential Bureau, the Confidential Transportation Bureau, the Central Direct Administration Bureau, the Central Archives, the Chairman Mao Memorial Hall Administration Bureau, the Special Accounting Office, the Veteran Cadre Bureau, the Personnel Bureau, and the Office of the Party Committee of the Central Committee. In December 1993, the General Office of the CCP Central Committee underwent an organizational reform. After the adjustment, it was divided into a vice-ministerial-level organization (the Central Archives and the National Archives Administration) and 10 functional bureaus: the Research Office, the Secretariat (of which the Legal Affairs Office is a vice-bureau-level organization located in the Secretariat), the Security Bureau, the Confidential Affairs Bureau, the Confidential Transportation Bureau, the Central Direct Administration Bureau, the Special Accounting Office, the Veteran Affairs Bureau, the Personnel Bureau, and the Party Committee of the Central Government.

Later, the Central Government directly under the Central Government and the central state organs implemented the cross-appointment of the principal leaders of the Party Committee of the Central Government and the personnel department to promote the joint efforts of the Party Committee and the personnel department to promote the implementation of the responsibility of managing and governing the Party. The Personnel Bureau of the General Office of the CCP Central Committee and the Party Committee of the Central Government also implemented the cross-appointment of the principal leaders.

== Organizational structure ==
- Organization and Publicity Department
- Cadre Division I
- Cadre Division II
- Party School of the General Office of the CCP Central Committee (Cadre Training Center)
