= Bureau of Regulations of the General Office of the Chinese Communist Party =

Bureau of Regulations of the General Office of the Central Committee of the Chinese Communist Party
- 中共中央办公厅法规局
- Type: Department of the General Office of the Chinese Communist Party
- Headquarters: No. 99, Fuyou Street, Xicheng District, Beijing
- Director: Song Gongde
- Parent organization: General Office of the Chinese Communist Party

General Office of the Central Committee of the Chinese Communist Party
- Simplified Chinese: 中共中央办公厅法规局
- Traditional Chinese: 中共中央辦公廳法規局
Transcriptions
Standard Mandarin
- Hanyu Pinyin: Zhōnggòng Zhōngyāng Bàngōngtīng Fǎguījú

The Bureau of Regulations of the General Office of the Central Committee of the Chinese Communist Party is an internal agency of the General Office of the Chinese Communist Party, responsible for reviewing the legality of party regulations and major decisions.

== History ==
The Regulations Bureau of the General Office of the Chinese Communist Party was established after the 18th CCP National Congress. It is mainly responsible for reviewing whether the party's internal regulations and major decisions are in compliance with the law.

Between the 18th and 19th CCP National Congresses, the CCP Central Committee promoted the construction of the intra-party regulations and systems, compiled the first five-year plan for the formulation of central intra-party regulations, established a joint conference system for the formulation of central intra-party regulations, and formulated and revised 74 central intra-party regulations, accounting for more than 40% of the more than 170 central intra-party regulations currently in force, thus basically forming the framework of the intra-party regulations and systems.

== Organizational structure ==
- General Affairs Office
- Manuscript Office
- Filing Office

== Leaders ==
=== Director ===
- Lu Guoqiang (? -?)
- Song Gongde (July 2018-)

=== Deputy Director ===
- Li Zhong (? -?)
- Song Gongde (? - July 2018)
- Su Ligang (? -)
