= Research Department of the General Office of the Chinese Communist Party =

Research Department of the General Office of the Central Committee of the Chinese Communist Party
- 中共中央办公厅调研室
- Type: Department of the General Office of the Chinese Communist Party
- Headquarters: No. 8, Fuyou Street, Xicheng District, Beijing
- Director-General: Lin Longbin
- Parent organization: General Office of the Chinese Communist Party

Research Department of the General Office of the Central Committee of the Chinese Communist Party
- Simplified Chinese: 中共中央办公厅调研室
- Traditional Chinese: 中共中央辦公廳研究室
Transcriptions
Standard Mandarin
- Hanyu Pinyin: Zhōnggòng Zhōngyāng Bàngōngtīng Diàoyánshì

The Research Department of the General Office of the Central Committee of the Chinese Communist Party is an internal agency of the General Office of the Chinese Communist Party, responsible for investigation and research work.

== History ==
In 1988, the General Office of the CCP Central Committee underwent an institutional reform. After the reform, it was divided into 12 bureau-level institutions: the Research Department, the Secretariat, the Security Bureau, the Confidential Bureau, the Confidential Transportation Bureau, the Central Administrative Bureau, the Central Archives, the Chairman Mao Memorial Hall Administration, the Special Accounting Office, the Veteran Cadre Bureau, the Personnel Bureau, and the Office of the Party Committee of the Central Committee. In December 1993, after the institutional reform of the General Office of the CCP Central Committee, the General Office of the CCP Central Committee was divided into one vice-ministerial-level institution (the Central Archives and the National Archives Administration) and 10 functional bureaus: the Research Department, the Secretariat (of which the Legal Affairs Office is a vice-bureau-level institution located in the Secretariat), the Security Bureau, the Confidential Bureau, the Confidential Transportation Bureau, the Central Administrative Bureau, the Special Accounting Office, the Veteran Cadre Bureau, the Personnel Bureau, and the Office of the Party Committee of the Central Committee.

The Research Department originally consisted of a political group, a united front group, a science and education group, a publicity group, and a comprehensive group. Later, it was changed to groups one to eight and a comprehensive research group.

== Organizational structure ==
- Comprehensive Research Group
- Group 1
- Group 2
- Group 3
- Group 4
- Group 5
- Group 6
- Group 7
- Group 8

== Leaders ==
=== Director ===
- Chen Jinyu (1987-March 1993)
- Yang Linglong (?-1998)
- Ling Jihua (June 1998 - 2003, deputy director of the General Office of the CCP Central Committee since 1999)
- Zhao Shengxuan (? - January 2007)
- Zhuo Songsheng (? - February 2014)
- Meng Xiangfeng (? - April 2015, Director of the Office of the Central Security Commission)
- Tang Fangyu (? - January 2023)

=== Deputy Director ===
- Chen Fujin (March 1986 - December 1990)
- Yang Linglong (February 1988 -?)
- Li Changjian (1991–1993, bureau-level official)
- Zhang Xijie (? -?)
- Yu Weidong (? -?)
- Ling Jihua (November 1997 - June 1998)
- Zhu Weiqun (?-1998)
- Zhao Shengxuan (? -?)
- Li Jun (May 1999 - July 2003, concurrently inspector)
- Li Wenguang (? -?)
- Xia Yong (May 2004 - June 2005)
- Shi Zhihong (?-2007)
- Li Xueqin (? -?)
- Zhang Ximing (May 2009 - May 2013, Deputy Secretary-General of the Central Propaganda Department since March 2013)
- Liu Jiayi (January - September 2011)
- Bao Suixian (? - 2014)
- Meng Shuchu (? -)
