= Supervision and Inspection Office of the General Office of the Chinese Communist Party =

Supervision and Inspection Office of the General Office of the Central Committee of the Chinese Communist Party
- 中共中央办公厅督促检查室
- Type: Department of the General Office of the Chinese Communist Party
- Headquarters: Beijing
- Director: Meng Shuchu
- Parent organization: General Office of the Chinese Communist Party

General Office of the Central Committee of the Chinese Communist Party
- Simplified Chinese: 中共中央办公厅督促检查室
- Traditional Chinese: 中共中央辦公廳督促檢查室
Transcriptions
Standard Mandarin
- Hanyu Pinyin: Zhōnggòng Zhōngyāng Bàngōngtīng Dūcù Jiǎncháshì

The Supervision and Inspection Office of the General Office of the Central Committee of the Chinese Communist Party is an internal agency of the General Office of the Chinese Communist Party, responsible for supervision and inspection work.

== History ==
The Secretariat of the General Office of the CCP Central Committee originally had the Secretariat Supervision and Inspection Division, which was later changed to the Secretariat Supervision and Inspection Office. It was later separated from the Secretariat and upgraded to the Supervision and Inspection Office of the General Office.

== Leaders ==
=== Director ===
- Zeng Xianjin (? -?)
- Jiang Jianping (? -?)
- Lu Guoqiang (? -?)
- Meng Shuchu (at the latest October 2024)

=== Supervision Specialist ===
- Xian Luohong (? -?)

=== Director-level inspector ===
- Hong Liu (? -?)
- Song Chongbing (? -?)
- Yu Rongzhong (? -?)
- Sun Jiangang (? -?)
- Lu Shuzheng (? -?)

=== Inspector ===
- Yang Shuhua (? -?)

=== Deputy Director ===
- Pu Xiaoou (? -?)
- Zhang Yong (? -?)
- Yang Jiefei (? -?)
- Li Bofu (? -?)
- Dou Qingshen (? -?)

=== Deputy Director-General Inspector ===
- Ding Zongkuan (? -?)
- Xu Shaogang (? -?)

=== Deputy Inspector ===
- Xu Shaogang (August 2012 - March 2016)
- Chen Genwang (? -?)
