= Politburo of the Chinese Communist Party =

Executive committee of the CCP

Political Bureau of the Central Committee of the Communist Party of China 中国共产党中央委员会政治局

Information
- General Secretary: Xi Jinping
- Elected by: Central Committee
- Responsible to: Central Committee
- Seats: 22 (as of October 2026)

Meeting place
- Huairen Hall, Zhongnanhai; Beijing, China

Politburo of the Chinese Communist Party
- Simplified Chinese: 中国共产党中央委员会政治局
- Traditional Chinese: 中國共產黨中央委員會政治局
- Literal meaning: China Communist Party Central Committee Political Bureau
Transcriptions
Standard Mandarin
- Hanyu Pinyin: Zhōngguó Gòngchǎndǎng Zhōngyāng Zhèngzhìjú
- Wade–Giles: Chung^{1}-kuo^{2} Kung^{4}-chʻan^{3}-tang^{3} Chung^{1}-yang^{1} Chêng^{4}-chih^{4}-chü^{2}

Politburo
- Chinese: 政治局
- Literal meaning: Political Bureau
Transcriptions
Standard Mandarin
- Hanyu Pinyin: Zhèngzhìjú
- Wade–Giles: Chêng^{4}-chih^{4}-chü^{2}

The Politburo of the Chinese Communist Party, officially the Political Bureau of the Central Committee of the Communist Party of China, is the executive committee of the Central Committee of the Chinese Communist Party. Currently, the bureau is a group of 22 top officials who oversee the party and central government. The politburo is headed by the general secretary. Unlike the politburos of other communist parties, the CCP Politburo subdelegates many of its powers to the smaller Politburo Standing Committee.

The Politburo is elected by the Central Committee. In practice, however, scholars of Chinese elite politics believe that the Politburo is a self-perpetuating body, with new members of both the Politburo and its Standing Committee chosen through a series of deliberations by current Politburo members and retired Politburo Standing Committee members. Under CCP general secretary Hu Jintao, the current and former Politburo members conducted a series of informal straw polls to determine the group's level of support for each new candidate's membership in the Politburo. This was replaced by the method of "face-to-face interviews, investigation and study" under CCP general secretary Xi Jinping. The process for selecting the new Politburo begins with a closed door meeting by the incumbent Politburo Standing Committee in Beidaihe in the summer before the National Congress of the CCP convenes.

The power of the Politburo resides largely in the fact that its members generally simultaneously hold positions within the People's Republic of China state positions and with the control over personnel appointments that the Politburo and Secretariat have. In addition, some Politburo members hold powerful regional positions. How the Politburo works internally is unclear, but it appears that the full Politburo meets once a month and the standing committee meets weekly. This is believed to be much less frequent than meetings of the former Soviet Politburo. The agenda for the meetings is controlled by the CCP general secretary and decisions are made by consensus rather than by majority vote.

== History ==
The Politburo was eclipsed by the Secretariat of the Chinese Communist Party in the early 1980s under Hu Yaobang, but has re-emerged as a dominant force after Hu's ousting in 1987.

== Composition and selection ==
Since the 1990s, Politburo members concurrently held posts in the party apparatus, in state posts, and as regional party chiefs. Some are party secretaries of important provinces or municipalities. In addition, members serving in the military and security sectors have been limited to 3 posts. In contrast, most members in the 1980s had a military command background. In 2017, for the 19th Central Committee Politburo, aside from the heads of the four main institutional hierarchies—the CCP, the National People's Congress, the State Council and the Chinese People's Political Consultative Conference, there were six members each holding posts in the party, the national government, the regional governments, and three in the military. The average age of the 2017 Politburo's members was 62, which was similar to those in recent decades. Before that, the CCP under Deng Xiaoping deliberately encouraged turnover by imposing term limits and retirement ages.

Since the 17th National Congress, the official way of electing the Politburo was through a process called "democratic recommendation" (民主推荐) where the CCP conducted a straw poll of 200 candidates to the Politburo, which were factored into the final list of candidates presented at the National Congress of the CCP. However, this was abolished in the 19th National Congress under Xi, which denounced the "vote buying" and voting "based on personal connections and favors" of this method, particularly in connection to politicians who fell after the anti-corruption campaign under Xi. The process was officially replaced with a method of "face-to-face interviews, investigation and study". For the 19th National Congress, Xi personally interviewed 57 officials, "relevant leading comrades of the CCP Central Committee" interviewed another 258 officials, while senior CMC officials interviewed 32 field commander-grade officers for the two military candidates for the Politburo.

=== Current composition ===
The 20th Politburo was elected at the first plenary session of the 20th Central Committee in October 2022. Xi Jinping’s persistence in his third five-year term represents a departure from the pattern of decade-long reigns for leaders, such as Mao and Deng.

=== Cadre training ===
In 2001, the Central Committee of the Chinese Communist Party published the 2001-2005 National Plan for Cadre Training elevating the importance of cadre training for the reform and opening up. The salaries of staff in party schools were brought in line with the salaries paid in regular Chinese universities. Teaching, research, and information technology was modernized to enable distance education throughout the party school system.

Modern cadre training focuses on quality and ability. Students are trained in ideological orthodoxy, submitting to Leninism and party discipline. The young cadre is trained in applying their knowledge creatively and independently, so as to deal flexibly with complex issues and accept continuous learning. The initiative for cadre training after 2002 was buttressed by the Central Party School, and the regional party schools, including the Party Schools in Shanghai and Shenzhen.

== Functions ==
The Politburo and the Politburo Standing Committee are the top decision-making institutions for the CCP Central Committee. According to the CCP constitution, the party's Central Committee elects the Politburo during a plenary session. Members of the Politburo are deputy-national-level leaders or higher.

=== Politburo meetings ===
The Politburo typically meets once a month. The CCP general secretary is responsible for convening the meetings of the Politburo and decides their agenda. The CCP almost always releases a readout to summarize the outcomes of Politburo meetings and, since 2002, these sessions have been widely publicized. Frequently, they address foreign affairs.

Since 2002, the Politburo has regularly held collective study sessions and more standard Politburo meetings. The standard meetings discuss new policy directives, provide feedback on policy implementation and prepare for future work conferences, plenums, or congresses. The collective study sessions serve as an opportunity for CCP leadership to promote new policies. They generally take place shortly after the standard meetings, usually on the same day or the day after. The Politburo invites professors, think tank scholars or other experts to give a lecture to the Politburo members about a topic chosen by the general secretary. These lectures often end with "work recommendations" for the Politburo and conclude with a speech by the general secretary on the study topic. The collective study sessions are often publicized and play an important role to signal leadership priorities to cadres.

A Politburo meeting in October 2017 after the first plenary session of the 19th CCP Central Committee stipulated that all Politburo members must make an annual written presentation to the CCP general secretary and the Central Committee.

== See also ==
- Collective leadership
  - Surname stroke order
- Central Committee of the Chinese Communist Party
  - Politburo Standing Committee of the Chinese Communist Party
    - General Secretary
  - Central Secretariat
  - General Office
    - Central Security Bureau
      - Central Guard Unit
