= Third plenary session of the 11th Central Committee of the Chinese Communist Party =

Deng Xiaoping's consolidation of power

- Chinese: 十一届三中全会
Transcriptions
Standard Mandarin
- Hanyu Pinyin: Shíyī Jiè Sān Zhōng Quánhuì

Full Name
- Traditional Chinese: 中國共產黨第十一屆中央委員會第三次全體會議
- Simplified Chinese: 中国共产党第十一届中央委员会第三次全体会议
Transcriptions
Standard Mandarin
- Hanyu Pinyin: Zhōngguó gòngchǎndǎng dì shíyī jiè zhōngyāng wěiyuánhuì dì sān cì quántǐ huìyì

The third plenary session of the 11th Central Committee of the Chinese Communist Party was a meeting of the Central Committee of the Chinese Communist Party held at the Jingxi Hotel in Beijing, China, from December 18 to December 22, 1978. The conference marked the beginning of the reform and opening up policy, and is widely seen as the moment when Deng Xiaoping became paramount leader of China replacing Chairman Hua Guofeng, who remained nominal Chairman of the Chinese Communist Party until 1981. The meeting was a decisive turning point in post-1949 Chinese history, marking the beginning of the wholesale repudiation of Chairman Mao's Cultural Revolution policies, and set China on the course for nationwide economic reforms.

== Background and preparation ==
During the 1970s, reformists had encouraged gradual changes in various forms, such as technological improvements in factories and adjustments to China's education model.

Before the plenum, demands for a repudiation of the Cultural Revolution increased, especially by those who were persecuted during Mao Zedong's last years. In October 1976, the radical Gang of Four led by Mao's widow Jiang Qing was arrested, and Deng Xiaoping himself—Mao's chief rival from 1975 to 1976—was officially rehabilitated in 1977.

Although Hua Guofeng, who succeeded as Chairman of the Chinese Communist Party and "the great helmsman," in 1976, tried to carry on the Maoist rhetoric and to gain an authority like that of Mao's, he also allowed the rehabilitation of many of Deng's allies, who, calling for economic reform, then revolted against him. During the 1978 working conference held in November, preparing for the plenum, Chen Yun raised the "six issues" Bo Yibo, Tao Zhu, Wang Heshou and Peng Dehuai; the 1976 Tiananmen Incident; and Kang Sheng's errors, to undermine the Maoists. At the same conference, Deng said it was necessary to go over ideological barriers.

== Relevant decisions ==
The plenum issued a communique stating, "[L]arge scale turbulent class struggles of a mass character have in the main come to an end." It described the Communist Party's focus going forward as socialist modernization, particularly through the Four Modernizations.

Trying to distance from the Cultural Revolution practice which put politics before the economy, the third plenary session argued that extensive criticism campaigns against Lin Biao and the Gang of Four were to be abandoned in favour of a greater attention to economics. Former President Liu Shaoqi's theory that under socialism, mass class struggle came to an end, and it was necessary to develop relations of production in order to follow the growth of social forces, was openly endorsed, while Mao's theory of continued revolution under socialism was abandoned. Changes in economic management were called for.

The new slogan was to "make China a modern, powerful socialist country before the end of this century". Deng's speech Emancipate the Mind, Seek Truth from Facts, and Unite as One in Looking to the Future emphasized the need for major reform to implement the Four Modernizations.

Although it did not take any open resolution against Mao, the plenary session attacked his leadership, implying that it did not guarantee full democracy or collective leadership. Particularly, it criticized the use of issuing Mao's "instructions", as it was said that "No personal view by a Party member in a position of responsibility, including leading comrades of the Central Committee, is to be called an 'instruction.'" It also put an end to the extensive personality cult towards Mao and Hua, even going as far as to avoid using the titles "Chairman Mao" and "Chairman Hua".

Putting forward the "Seeking truth from facts" principle, the plenum started the repudiation of the Cultural Revolution: the "Counterattack the Right-Deviationist Reversal-of-Verdicts Trend" campaign aimed against Deng was openly rejected, and Peng Dehuai, Tao Zhu, Bo Yibo and Yang Shangkun were rehabilitated. The Cultural Revolution was openly rejected only in 1981 at the Sixth Plenary Session. The weakness of both the National People's Congress and the Supreme People's Court during this period were criticized as well.

== Leadership changes ==
Power transition in China
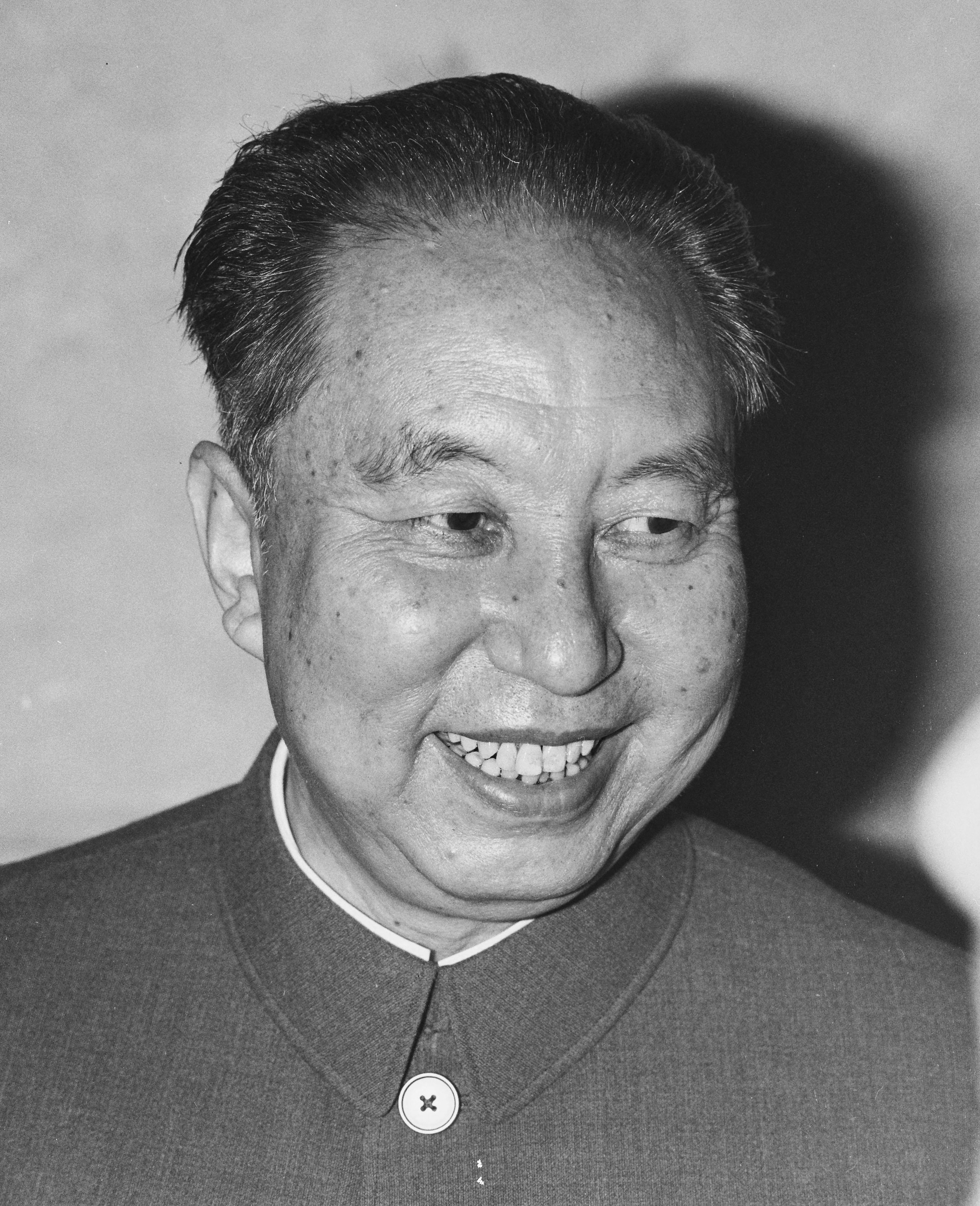
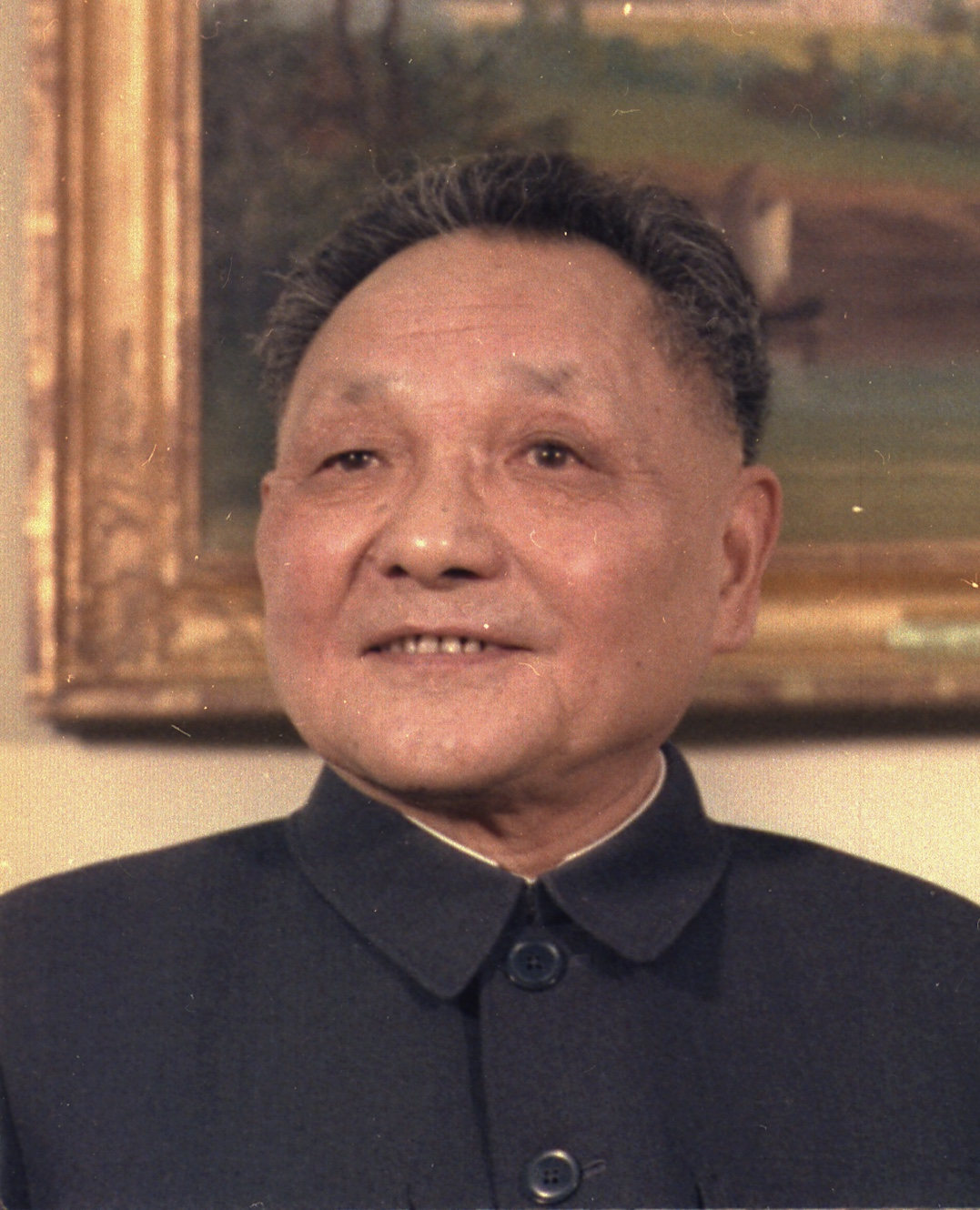
Hua Guofeng (left) and Deng Xiaoping (right)

Despite its great relevance in advancing Deng Xiaoping's ideas and leadership, during the third plenary session no critical or substantial reshuffle occurred, as opposed to the sixth plenary session held in 1981 when Hua Guofeng was removed from his post of Party Chairman. Important additions were made, however.

Chen Yun was appointed Politburo Standing Committee member, as well as Party Vice-chairman and First Secretary of the reformed Central Commission for Discipline Inspection. Deng Yingchao, Hu Yaobang and Wang Zhen were all made new Politburo members, and they were given important posts in the Discipline Inspection Commission.

Nine new members, former Head of the PLA General Staff Huang Kecheng among them, were co-opted in the Central Committee.
