= You Xigui =

Chinese general, retired 2007

- 由喜贵
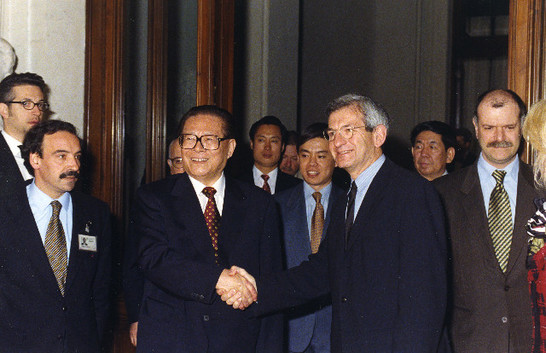
- In October 1999, Jiang Zemin visited France, with You Xigui on the second from right.

Director of the Central Guard Bureau of the General Office of the Chinese Communist Party
- In office August 1994 – September 2007
- Preceded by: Yang Dezhong
- Succeeded by: Cao Qing

Personal details
- Born: May 1939 (age 86) Ding County, Hebei, China
- Party: Chinese Communist Party

Military service
- Allegiance: People's Republic of China
- Branch/service: People's Liberation Army Ground Force
- Years of service: 1958–2007
- Rank: General
- Unit: Central Guard Regiment

Chinese name
- Simplified Chinese: 由喜贵
- Traditional Chinese: 由喜貴
Transcriptions
Standard Mandarin
- Hanyu Pinyin: Yóu Xǐguì

You Xigui (Chinese: 由喜贵; born May 1939) is a retired general in the People's Liberation Army of China. He was an alternate of the 15th and 16th Central Committee of the Chinese Communist Party.

== Biography ==
You was born in Ding County (now Dingzhou), Hebei, in May 1939. He served in the Central Guard Regiment from January 1958 to July 1983. In July 1983, he was assigned to the Central Guard Bureau of the General Office of the Chinese Communist Party, where he was promoted to deputy director in July 1985 and to director in August 1994.

He attained the rank of major general (shaojiang) in July 1990, lieutenant general (zhongjiang) in July 1997, and general (shangjiang) in June 2004.。

Military offices
Preceded by Yang Dezhong	Director of the Central Guard Bureau of the General Office of the Chinese Communist Party; 1994–2007	Succeeded by Cao Qing
