= Gang of Four =

Chinese political faction during the cultural revolution

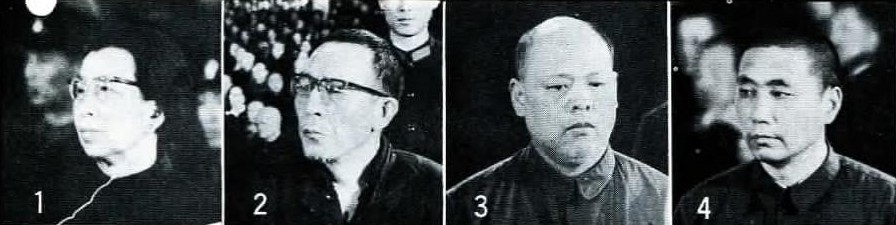
The Gang of Four on trial in November 1980. Left to right: Jiang Qing, Zhang Chunqiao, Yao Wenyuan, Wang Hongwen

The Gang of Four (simplified Chinese: 四人帮; traditional Chinese: 四人幫; pinyin: Sì rén bāng) was a Maoist Political faction composed of four Chinese Communist Party (CCP) officials. They came to prominence during the Cultural Revolution (1966–1976) and were later arrested and charged with treason and other crimes. The gang's leading figure was Jiang Qing (the wife of Mao Zedong). The other members were Zhang Chunqiao, Yao Wenyuan, and Wang Hongwen.

The Gang of Four controlled the power organs of the CCP through the later stages of the Cultural Revolution, although it remains unclear which major decisions were made by CCP Chairman Mao Zedong and carried out by the Gang, and which were the result of the Gang of Four's own planning. Following a series of five deaths in 18 months, concluding with Mao's, the Gang comprised half the remaining members of the CCP Politburo Standing Committee.

On October 6, 1976, shortly after Mao's death on September 9, the Gang was removed from power in a bloodless coup d'état, the "Smashing the Gang of Four," organized by CCP Chairman Hua Guofeng. This event is usually considered to mark the end of the Cultural Revolution, although full repudiation of the Cultural Revolution did not come until later, with the return of Deng Xiaoping at the 11th National Congress of the Chinese Communist Party and Hua's gradual loss of authority.

== Formation ==
The group was led by Jiang Qing, and consisted of three of her close associates, Zhang Chunqiao, Yao Wenyuan, and Wang Hongwen. Two other men who were already dead in 1976, Kang Sheng and Xie Fuzhi, were named as having been part of the "Gang". Chen Boda and Mao Yuanxin, the latter being Mao's nephew, were also considered some of the Gang's closer associates.

Most Western accounts consider that the actual leadership of the Cultural Revolution consisted of a wider group, referring predominantly to the members of the Central Cultural Revolution Group. Most prominent was Lin Biao, until his purported defection from China and death in a plane crash in 1971. Chen Boda is often classed as a member of Lin's faction rather than Jiang Qing's.

== Role ==
At the beginning of the Cultural Revolution, on November 10, 1965, Yao Wenyuan, in one of his most famous pieces of writing, published an article in Wenhuibao criticizing the play Hai Rui Dismissed from Office. The article argued that the opera was actually a sympathetic portrayal of the reformist efforts of the military hero Peng Dehuai and thus an attack on Chairman Mao's Great Leap Forward. Mao subsequently purged Peng from power. The article is cited as the spark that launched the Cultural Revolution.

Jiang Qing staged revolutionary operas during the Cultural Revolution and met with the Red Guards.

The removal of this group from power is sometimes considered to have marked the end of the Cultural Revolution, which had been launched by Mao in 1966 as part of his power struggle with leaders such as Liu Shaoqi, Deng Xiaoping and Peng Zhen. Mao placed his wife Jiang Qing, a former film actress who before 1966 had not taken a public political role, in charge of the country's cultural apparatus. Zhang, Yao and Wang were party leaders in Shanghai who had played leading roles in securing that city for Mao during the Cultural Revolution.

Around the time of the death of Lin Biao in 1971, the Cultural Revolution began to lose momentum. The new commanders of the People's Liberation Army demanded that order be restored in light of the dangerous situation along the border with the Soviet Union (see Sino-Soviet split). Premier Zhou Enlai, who had accepted the Cultural Revolution but never fully supported it, regained his authority, and used it to bring Deng Xiaoping back into the Party leadership at the 10th Party Congress in 1973. Former President Liu Shaoqi had meanwhile died in prison in 1969.

Near the end of Mao's life, a power struggle occurred between the Gang of Four and the alliance of Deng Xiaoping, Zhou Enlai, and Ye Jianying.

== Downfall ==
"Decisively Throw Out the Wang-Zhang-Jiang-Yao Anti-Party Clique!"

Zhou Enlai died in January 1976, and, in the subsequent months, a power struggle occurred in the top echelons of the party. The reformist Deng was named acting premier, while the Gang of Four began using their newspapers to criticize Deng and to mobilize their urban militia groups. Much of the military and party security remained under the control of the party elders of the Central Committee, who generally took a cautious role in mediating between Deng and the Gang of Four. They agreed to the removal of Deng from office after the April 1976 Tiananmen Incident but took steps to ensure that Deng and his allies would not be personally harmed in the process.

On September 9, Chairman Mao died. For the next few weeks, the Gang of Four retained control over the government media, and many articles appeared on the theme of "principles laid down" (or "established") by Mao near the end of his life. (The words "principles laid down" were themselves supposedly a quotation from Mao, but their canonical status was in dispute.) Urban militia units commanded by supporters of the radical group were placed on a heightened state of readiness.

After Mao died, the four represented a quarter of the remaining members of the last Politburo Mao had chosen. Premier Hua Guofeng attacked the radicals' media line at a Politburo meeting in late September; but Jiang Qing emphatically disagreed with Hua, and she insisted that she be named as the new party chairman. The meeting ended inconclusively. On October 4 the radical group warned, via an article in the Guangming Daily, that any revisionist who interfered with the established principles would "come to no good end".

The radicals hoped that the key military leaders Wang Dongxing and Chen Xilian would support them, but instead, Hua won the Army over to his side. On 6 October 1976, Hua had the four leading radicals and a number of their lesser associates arrested. Han Suyin gave a detailed account of their overthrow:

An emergency session of the Politburo was to take place in the Great Hall of the People that evening. Their presence was required. Since Wang Dongxing had been their ally, they did not suspect him... As they passed through the swinging doors into the entrance lobby, they were apprehended and led off in handcuffs. A special 8341 unit then went to Madam Mao's residence at No. 17 Fisherman's Terrace and arrested her. That night Mao Yuanxin was arrested in Manchuria, and the propagandists of the Gang of Four in Peking University and in newspaper offices were taken into custody. All was done with quiet and efficiency. In Shanghai, the Gang's supporters received a message to come to Beijing "for a meeting". They came and were arrested. Thus, without shedding a drop of blood, the plans of the Gang of Four to wield supreme power were ended.

Beginning on 21 October, nationwide denunciations of the Gang began, which culminated in the December release of files related to the Gang's alleged crimes to the public. The party issued a denunciation of the Gang of Four as "left in form, right in essence". Government media blamed the Gang of Four and Lin Biao for the excesses of the Cultural Revolution. According to both civilian and government accounts, celebrations were prominent and nationwide, not limited to the streets of Beijing and other major cities. During the nationwide "Movement of Exposition, Criticism and Uncovering (揭批查运动)" millions of formerly "rebel faction" red guards were publicly criticized as they were thought to be related to the Gang of Four. For many Chinese, the Gang, and its head Jiang Qing in particular, were a living symbol of everything that had gone wrong during the Cultural Revolution and their downfall was taken as a sign that China was on the brink of a new era.

== Aftermath ==
Immediately after the arrests, Premier Hua Guofeng, Marshal Ye Jianying, and economic czars Chen Yun and Li Xiannian formed the core of the next party leadership. These four, together with the rehabilitated Deng Xiaoping and Wang Dongxing, were elected party Vice Chairmen at the August 1977 National Congress of the Chinese Communist Party. At the politburo level, the membership of all four living marshals, seven other generals and at least five others with close military ties reflected the deep concern for national stability.

== Trial ==
The Gang of Four trials were part of the communist party's effort to establish an institutionalized justice system. The trials were highly visible to the Chinese public thanks to the daily television broadcasts of trial sessions and wide circulation of documentary films about the trials.

In late 1980, the four deposed leaders were subjected to a trial by the Supreme People's Court of China with Jiang Hua presiding; in January 1981, they were convicted of anti-party activities. During the trial, Jiang Qing in particular was extremely defiant, protesting loudly and bursting into tears at some points. She was the only member of the Gang of Four to argue on her own behalf; her argument was that she obeyed the orders of Chairman Mao Zedong at all times. Zhang Chunqiao refused to admit any wrongdoing. Yao Wenyuan and Wang Hongwen expressed repentance and confessed their alleged crimes.

The prosecution separated political errors from actual crimes. Among the latter were the usurpation of state power and party leadership; the persecution of some 750,000 people, 34,375 of whom died during the period 1966–1976. The official records of the trial have not yet been released.

Audience members who attended the opening of the trial included selected people's representatives from each province and autonomous region, as well as victims' families including the widows of Liu Shaoqi, He Long, and Luo Ruiqing.

Jiang Qing and Zhang Chunqiao received death sentences that were later commuted to life imprisonment, while Wang Hongwen and Yao Wenyuan were given life and twenty years in prison, respectively. All members of the Gang of Four have since died; Jiang Qing committed suicide in 1991, Wang Hongwen died in 1992, and Yao Wenyuan and Zhang Chunqiao died in 2005, having been released from prison in 1996 and 1998, respectively.

Supporters of the Gang of Four, including Chen Boda and Mao Yuanxin, were also sentenced.

== Use of the term as a historical analogy ==
=== "Little Gang of Four" ===
In the struggle between Hua Guofeng's and Deng Xiaoping's followers, a new term emerged, pointing to Hua's four closest collaborators, Wang Dongxing, Wu De, Ji Dengkui and Chen Xilian. In 1980, they were charged with "grave errors" in the struggle against the Gang of Four and demoted from the Political Bureau to mere Central Committee membership.

=== Hong Kong's "Gangs of Four" ===
In 2013, mainland Chinese state media labelled Anson Chan, Martin Lee, Joseph Zen and Jimmy Lai as 'Hong Kong's "Gang of Four"' due to their alleged foreign connections.

In 2016, the pro-Beijing newspaper Sing Pao Daily News started publishing editorials that criticized Tung Chee-hwa, Leung Chun-ying, Zhang Xiaoming and Jiang Zaizhong as another 'Hong Kong's Gang of Four'. The articles claim that although all of them appeared to be loyal to Beijing, they were actually betraying it and destabilizing Hong Kong for their personal interest, by igniting social and political conflicts, as well as through other mischievous means.

In 2019, Chinese state media labelled Anson Chan, Martin Lee, Jimmy Lai and Albert Ho as yet another 'Gang of Four of Hong Kong' due to their alleged collusion with foreign forces in relation to the 2019–2020 Hong Kong protests. The phrase has in turn been denounced by the four individuals.

== See also ==
- Bibliographies of the People's Republic of China
- Bibliography of China's reform and opening
- Soviet Union's Anti-Party Group
- Poland's Natolin faction
- Britain’s Gang of Four, a group of Politicians who split from the Labour Party to form the Social Democratic Party
- Gang of Four, a British Post-punk band who were named after the group
