= General Office of the Chinese Communist Party =

Chinese Communist Party coordinating body

General Office of the Central Committee of the Chinese Communist Party
- 中国共产党中央委员会办公厅; Zhōngguó Gòngchǎndǎng Zhōngyāng Wěiyuánhuì Bàngōngtīng
- Emblem of the Chinese Communist Party

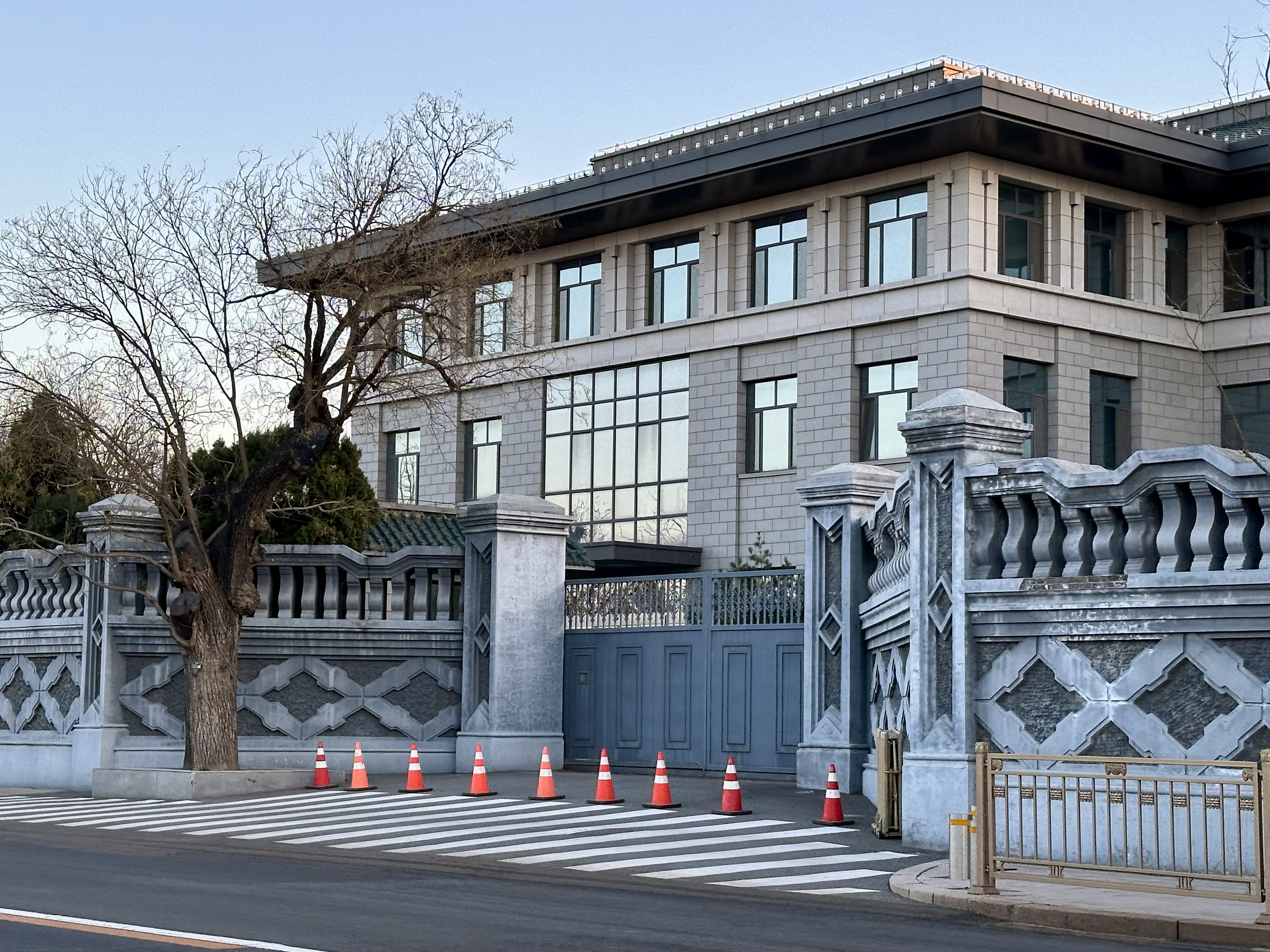
- Entrance Gate to the Headquarters of CCP General Office

Agency overview
- Formed: 1942; 84 years ago
- Type: Department directly reporting to the Central Committee; Ministerial level agency
- Jurisdiction: Chinese Communist Party
- Headquarters: West Building, Zhongnanhai, Beijing
- Ministers responsible: Cai Qi, Director; Meng Xiangfeng*, Deputy Director
- Parent agency: Central Committee of the Chinese Communist Party
- Child agencies: Central Security Bureau; Administrative Bureau of the Mao Mauseleum

Footnotes
- *Maintains full minister-level rank

General Office of the Central Committee of the Chinese Communist Party
- Simplified Chinese: 中共中央办公厅
- Traditional Chinese: 中共中央辦公廳
- Literal meaning: Chinese-Communist Central Business Hall
Transcriptions
Standard Mandarin
- Hanyu Pinyin: Zhōnggòng Zhōngyāng Bàngōngtīng

Alternative Chinese name
- Simplified Chinese: 中办
- Traditional Chinese: 中辦
- Literal meaning: Central Office
Transcriptions
Standard Mandarin
- Hanyu Pinyin: Zhōngbàn

The General Office of the Central Committee of the Chinese Communist Party, often referred to as the Central Office (中办 or Zhōngbàn), is an office directly under the Central Committee of the Chinese Communist Party in charge of providing support for the Central Committee and its Politburo, including codifying intra-party regulations, conducting policy research and providing administrative support. The director of the General Office currently serves as the first-ranked secretary of the Secretariat of the Chinese Communist Party.

== History ==
The General Office's establishment date is uncertain, though it existed by 1942 as Li Fuchun was its chief at that time; previously, its functions were exercised by the Organization Department or technical secretariats.

== Function ==
The General Office is responsible for handling the day-to-day operations of the Central Committee, Secretariat, Politburo, and the Politburo Standing Committee. It is in charge of assisting in drafting, revising and editing and circulating party directives and internal memos, as well as the classification of party information. The General Office also transmits and ensures the implementation of the instructions from the top-level, formulates CCP regulations, and supervises legislation.

The General Office is also in charge of arranging logistics for major events and meetings of the Central Committee and its Politburo, and for preparing agendas, recording and filing meeting minutes, and distributing communications to meeting stakeholders. It is responsible for administrative staff and political secretaries, collecting briefing information, organizing inspection tours, managing the finances of the CCP, and handling logistics and liaisons with other top-level CCP organizations.

Although its business is often not overtly political, its Directors have historically had close connections with the CCP's top leaders, and usually join the Politburo or the Secretariat after their period leading the General Office. The Director of the General office has been informally referred to as the "Danei Zongguan" (大内总管), roughly translated as "the gatekeeper". While the Director of the General Office is sometimes referred to as an analogue to the party General Secretary's "Chief of Staff", the General Secretary also maintains a personal staff as part of the Office of the General Secretary, whose director may also, but not necessarily, conterminously hold the position of Director of the General Office.

== Organization ==
The CCP General Office has the following institutions:

=== Internal organization ===
- Research Department (Deputy-ministerial level)
- Secretariat
- Bureau of Regulations
- Security Bureau
- Confidential Bureau (Deputy-ministerial level)
- Confidential Transportation Bureau
- Special Accounting Office
- Supervision and Inspection Office
- Personnel Bureau
- Office of the General Secretary
- Administration Bureau of Organs directly under the Central Committee

=== Subordinate agencies ===
- Central Archives (Deputy-ministerial level)
- Office of the Central Secrecy Commission (Deputy-ministerial level)
- Office of the Central Leading Group for Cryptography (Deputy-ministerial level)

=== Directly-affiliated institutions ===
- Central Government Offices Administration Bureau (Deputy-ministerial level)
- Chairman Mao Memorial Hall Administration
- Beijing Electronic Science and Technology Institute
- Central Gifts and Cultural Relics Management Center

== See also ==
- Politics of the People's Republic of China
- Secretariat of the Chinese Communist Party
- General Offices
  - General Office of the State Council
  - General Office of the Central Military Commission
- Office of the Politburo of the Central Committee of the SED
- General Department of the Communist Party of the Soviet Union
