= Central Guard Bureau =

Chinese security agency

Central Guard Bureau of the General Office of the Chinese Communist Party
- 中共中央办公厅警卫局
- Abbreviation: Central Guard Bureau (CGB or CG) / 中央警卫局 (中警局 or 中警)
- Formation: 1949
- Type: Security
- Legal status: Active
- Headquarters: Zhongnanhai, etc.
- Location: Beijing
- Director: Zhou Hongxu
- Parent organization: General Office of the Chinese Communist Party
- Subsidiaries: Central Guard Unit (PLA Unit 61889)
- Affiliations: Joint Staff Department of the Central Military Commission (nominal); Ministry of Public Security (nominal)

The Central Guard Bureau (CGB) of the General Office of the Chinese Communist Party is the organization responsible for the protection of senior party members, their families, and important foreign dignitaries in the People's Republic of China. It has been widely called the CGB since the Cultural Revolution and is also the Ninth Bureau of the Ministry of Public Security.

== History ==
In April 1949, the Security Department of the General Office of the CPC Central Committee was established in Xibaipo, Hebei Province. In March 1950, it was expanded and established as the 8th Bureau of the Ministry of Public Security. In March 1953, the Zhongnanhai Security Bureau of the General Office of the CPC Central Committee was established. It was separated from the Security Bureau and was established independently, being modeled after the 9th Chief Directorate of the Soviet Committee for State Security and was listed as the 9th Bureau of the Ministry of Public Security.

In April 1964, the 8th and 9th Bureaus of the Ministry of Public Security were merged into a new 9th Bureau and in October 1969, the 9th Bureau of the Ministry of Public Security and the Central Guard Regiment were merged to form the Guard Office of the General Office, which was incorporated into the military structure and upgraded to the corps level.

In October 1976, the Security Department participated in the operation to arrest the Gang of Four. For the convenience of communication and for historical organizational reasons, the bureau was also included in the 9th Bureau of the Ministry of Public Security, but the Ministry of Public Security had no command or management authority over it. On 1 January 2016, the Central Military Commission issued its "Deepening National Defense and Military Reform" document, which resulted in a major restructuring of the military and specifically the abolishment of the People's Liberation Army General Staff Department, with the bureau was transferred to the newly established Joint Staff Department of the Central Military Commission.

== Functions ==
The Central Guard Bureau is tasked with the protection of senior party members, their families, and important foreign dignitaries. The CGB selects and controls the bodyguards of protectees; bodyguards are typically trained by the People's Liberation Army (PLA). It effectively controls the Central Guard Regiment by having bureau deputy directors in leadership positions in the unit. The CGB is part of the internal security apparatus as protectees are constantly under surveillance by their bureau-selected bodyguards. Chinese media has referred to the bureau as "an exceptionally unusual organization, straddling both the police and military spheres, and one that requires the deep trust of the country’s top leadership".

== See also ==
- United States Secret Service
