= Erqi =

Erqi may refer to:

- Erqi District, in Zhengzhou, Henan, China
- Erqi Memorial Tower, in Zhengzhou, Henan, China
