= 8th Secretariat of the Chinese Communist Party =

Chinese government body

The 8th Secretariat, formally the Secretariat of the 8th Central Committee of the Communist Party of China, was nominated by the 8th Politburo Standing Committee and approved by the 1st Plenary Session of the 11th Central Committee on 28 September 1956. The Secretariat was abolished by the 9th National Congress in 1969 and did not resurface until the formation of the 11th Secretariat in 1980.

== Officers ==
=== Secretary-General (1956–1966) ===
Secretary-General of the 8th Central Committee of the Chinese Communist Party
Portrait	Name	Hanzi	Birth	PM	Death	Ref.
	Deng Xiaoping	邓小平	1904	1924	1997	

=== Standing Secretary (1966–1969) ===
Standing Secretary of the 8th Central Committee of the Chinese Communist Party
Portrait	Name	Hanzi	Birth	PM	Death	Ref.
	Tao Zhu	陶铸	1908	1926	1969	

== Composition ==
=== Members ===
Members of the Secretariat of the 8th Central Committee
Name	Hanzi	Birth	PM	Death	Birthplace	No. of offices	Ref.
Deng Xiaoping	邓小平	1904	1924	1997	Sichuan	One: Party office; Secretary-General, Central Committee Secretariat	
Huang Kecheng (Note: Tan Zheng and Huang Kecheng were dismissed from the Secretariat by a decision of the 10th Plenary Session of the 8th Central Committee on 24–27 September 1962.)	黄克诚	1902	1925	1986	Hunan	Two: Military office; Secretary-General, Central Military Commission; State office; Vice Minister of National Defense	
Kang Sheng (Note: Kang Sheng was elected the Secretariat by a decision of the 10th Plenary Session of the 8th Central Committee on 24–27 September 1962.)	康生	1898	1925	1975	Shandong	One: State office; Vice Premier of China	
Li Fuchun (Note: Li Fuchun and Li Xiannian were elected to the Secretariat by a decision of the 5th Plenary Session of the 8th Central Committee on 25 May 1958.)	李富春	1900	1922	1975	Hunan	Two: State offices; Vice Premier of China; Chairman, State Planning Commission of the State Council	
Li Xiannian	李先念	1909	1927	1992	Hubei	One: State office; Vice Premier of the People's Republic of China; Minister of Finance	
Li Xuefeng	李雪峰	1903	1933	2003	Shanxi	Two: Military office; Political Commissar, Beijing Military Region of the People's Liberation Army; State office; Secretary, Beijing Municipal Party Committee	
Liu Ningyi	刘宁一	1907	1925	1994	Hebei	Two: State offices; Vice Chairman, Standing Committee of the National People's Congress; Secretary-General, Standing Committee of the National People's Congress	
Lu Dingyi (Note: Lu Dingyi and Luo Ruiqing were elected the Secretariat by a decision of the 10th Plenary Session of the 8th Central Committee on 24–27 September 1962 and dismissed by a decision of the 8th Politburo in May 1966.)	陆定一	1906	1925	1996	Jiangsu	Three: Party office; Head, Propaganda Department of the Central Committee; State office; Vice Premier of the People's Republic of China; Minister of Culture	
Luo Ruiqing	罗瑞卿	1906	1928	1978	Sichuan	Three: Military office; Chief of the General Staff, People's Liberation Army; State office; Minister of Public Security; Vice Minister of National Defense	
Peng Zhen (Note: Peng Zhen and Yang Shangkun were dismissed from the Secretariat by a decision of the 8th Politburo in May 1966.)	彭真	1902	1923	1997	Shanxi	Two: Party office; Secretary, Beijing Municipal Party Committee; State office; Vice Chairman, Standing Committee of the National People's Congress; Secretary-General, Standing Committee of the National People's Congress; Mayor, Beijing Municipal People's Government	
Tan Zheng	谭政	1906	1927	1988	Hunan	Two: Military office; Chief of the General Staff, People's Liberation Army; Party office; Deputy Secretary, Central Supervisory Commission of the Central Committee	
Tan Zhenlin	谭震林	1902	1926	1983	Jiangxi	One: State office; Vice Premier of the People's Republic of China	
Tao Zhu	陶铸	1908	1926	1969	Hunan	Three: Party office; Head, Propaganda Department of the Central Committee; Secretary, Guangdong Provincial Party Committee; State office; Governor, Guangdong Provincial People's Government	
Wang Jiaxiang	王稼祥	1906	1928	1974	Anhui	Two: Party office; Head, Foreign Liaison Department of the Central Committee; State office; Vice Minister of Foreign Affairs	
Xie Fuzhi (Note: Xie Fuzhi and Liu Ningyi were elected the Secretariat by a decision of the 11th Plenary Session of the 8th Central Committee on 1–12 August 1966.)	谢富治	1909	1931	1972	Hubei	Two: State offices; Minister of Public Security; Political Commissar, People's Armed Police	
Ye Jianying (Note: Ye Jianying was elected the Secretariat by a decision of the 8th Politburo in May 1966.)	叶剑英	1897	1927	1986	Guangdong	Two: Military offices; Secretary-General, Central Military Commission of the Central Committee; Political Commissar, Academy of Military Sciences of the People's Liberation Army	

=== Alternates ===
Alternates of the Secretariat of the 8th Central Committee
Name	Hanzi	Birth	PM	Death	Birthplace	No. of offices	Ref.
Hu Qiaomu	胡乔木	1912	1932	1992	Jiangsu	One: Party office; Deputy Secretary-General, Central Committee	
Liu Lantao	刘澜涛	1910	1926	1997	Sichuan	Three: Military office; First Political Commissar, Lanzhou Military Region of the People's Liberation Army; Organisational office; Vice Chairman, National Committee of the Chinese People's Political Consultative Conference; Party office; First Secretary, Northwest Bureau of the Central Committee	
Yang Shangkun	杨尚昆	1907	1926	1998	Chongqing	Two: Party offices; Head, General Office of the Central Committee; Deputy Secretary-General, Central Committee	

== See also ==
- 8th Politburo Standing Committee of the Chinese Communist Party
- 8th Politburo of the Chinese Communist Party
- 8th Central Committee of the Chinese Communist Party
