= Li Zhijian =

Li Zhijian may refer to:

- Li Zhijian (physicist)
- Li Zhijian (politician)
