= Beijing News (disambiguation) =

The Beijing News or Xīn Jīng Bào is a Chinese daily newspaper.

Beijing News or Jing Bao may also refer to:

- Peking Gazette or Jīng Bào, a defunct newspaper

== See also ==
- Beijing § Etymology
- Beijing Daily or Běijīng Rìbào, a daily newspaper from Beijing
- Beijing Evening News or Běijīng Wǎnbào, a Chinese daily evening newspaper
