= World Congress on Marxism =

Biennial academic meeting in Peking

The World Congress on Marxism (Chinese: 世界马克思主义大会) is an academic congress under the name of Marxism held in mainland China.

According to the website of Peking University, the congress was "approved by the Ministry of Education of China, under the guidance and support of the Publicity Department of the Chinese Communist Party, the Beijing Municipal Committee of the Chinese Communist Party, and the Beijing Municipal People's Government. It was sponsored by Peking University."

The first congress was held in Beijing on October 10–11, 2015. More than 400 Chinese and foreign scholars attended the congress. The second congress was held in Beijing on May 5–6, 2018. It coincided with the 200th anniversary of the birth of Karl Marx. The theme of the second congress was "Marxism and a Human Community with Shared Destiny".

According to the organizer, Peking University, the congress will be held every two years or so.
