= 13th Secretariat of the Chinese Communist Party =

Chinese government body

The 13th Secretariat, formally the Secretariat of the 13th Central Committee of the Communist Party of China, was nominated by the 13th Politburo Standing Committee and approved by the 1st Plenary Session of the 13th Central Committee on 2 November 1987, in the aftermath of the 13th National Congress of the Chinese Communist Party (CCP). This electoral term was preceded by the 12th Secretariat and succeeded by the 14th in 1992.

== General Secretary of the Central Committee ==
General Secretary of the 13th Central Committee of the Chinese Communist Party
Portrait	Name	Hanzi	Took office	Left office	Birth	PM	Death	Ref.
	Zhao Ziyang	赵紫阳	2 November 1987	24 June 1989	1919	1938	2005	
	Jiang Zemin	江泽民	24 June 1989	19 October 1992	1926	1946	2022	

== Composition ==
=== Members ===
==== 1st Plenary Session (1987–1989) ====
Members of the Secretariat of the 13th Central Committee of the Chinese Communist Party
Rank	Name	Hanzi	12th SEC	4th PLE	Birth	PM	Death	Birthplace	No. of offices	Ref.
1	Hu Qili	胡启立	Old	Not	1929	1948	Alive	Shaanxi	One: Party office; First-ranked Secretary, Secretariat of the Central Committee	
2	Qiao Shi	乔石	Old	Renewed	1924	1940	2015	Shanghai	Two: Party offices; Secretary, Standing Committee of the Central Commission for Discipline Inspection; Secretary, Central Political and Legal Affairs Commission of the Central Committee	
3	Rui Xingwen	芮杏文	New	Not	1927	1945	2005	Jiangsu	Two: Party office; Secretary, Beijing Municipal Committee; State office; Mayor of the Beijing Municipal People's Government	
4	Yan Mingfu	阎明复	New	Not	1931	1965	2023	Tianjin	One: Party office; Head, General Office of the Central Committee	

==== 4th Plenary Session (1989–1992) ====
Members of the Secretariat of the 13th Central Committee of the Chinese Communist Party
Rank	Name	Hanzi	1st PLE	14th SEC	Birth	PM	Death	Birthplace	No. of offices	Ref.
1	Qiao Shi	乔石	Old	Not	1924	1940	2015	Shanghai	Two: Party offices; Secretary, Standing Committee of the Central Commission for Discipline Inspection; Secretary, Central Political and Legal Affairs Commission of the Central Committee	
2	Li Ruihuan	李瑞环	New	Not	1934	1959	Alive	Tianjin	One: Party office; Leader, Central Leading Group for Propaganda, Ideology and Culture of the Central Committee	
3	Ding Guangen	丁关根	New	Reelected	1929	1956	2012	Jiangsu	Two: Party office; Head, United Front Work Department of the Central Committee; State office; Chairman, Taiwan Affairs Office of the State Council	
4	Yang Baibing (Note: Yang Baibing was elected to the Secretariat by a decision of the 5th Plenary Session of the 13th Central Committee on 6–9 November 1989.)	杨白冰	New	Not	1920	1938	2013	Chongqing	Two: Military offices; Secretary-General, Central Military Commission; Head, General Political Department of the People's Liberation Army	

=== Alternate ===
Alternate of the Secretariat of the 13th Central Committee of the Chinese Communist Party
Rank	Name	Hanzi	12th SEC	14th SEC	Birth	PM	Death	Birthplace	No. of offices	Ref.
1	Wen Jiabao	温家宝	New	Member	1942	1965	Alive	Tianjin	One: Party office; Head, General Office of the Central Committee	

== See also ==
- 13th Politburo Standing Committee of the Chinese Communist Party
- 13th Politburo of the Chinese Communist Party
- 13th Central Committee of the Chinese Communist Party
