= 12th Secretariat of the Chinese Communist Party =

Chinese government body

The 12th Secretariat, formally the Secretariat of the 12th Central Committee of the Communist Party of China, was nominated by the 12th Politburo Standing Committee and approved by the 1st Plenary Session of the 12th Central Committee on 13 September 1982, in the aftermath of the 12th National Congress of the Chinese Communist Party (CCP). This electoral term was preceded by the 11th Secretariat and succeeded by the 13th in 1987.

== General Secretary of the Central Committee ==
General Secretary of the 12th Central Committee
Portrait	Name	Hanzi	Took office	Left office	Birth	PM	Death	Ref.
	Hu Yaobang	胡耀邦	13 September 1982	15 January 1987	1915	1933	1989	
	Zhao Ziyang	赵紫阳	15 January 1987	2 November 1987	1919	1938	2005	

== Composition ==
=== Members ===
==== 1st Plenary Session (1982–1985) ====
Members of the Secretariat of the 12th Central Committee
Rank	Name	Hanzi	11th SEC	5th PLE	Birth	PM	Death	Birthplace	No. of offices	Ref.
1	Wan Li	万里	Old	Renewed	1916	1933	2015	Shandong	One: State office; First-ranked Vice Premier of the People's Republic of China	
2	Xi Zhongxun	习仲勋	Old	Resigned	1913	1928	2002	Shaanxi	One: State office; Vice Chairman, Standing Committee of the National People's Congress	
3	Deng Liqun	邓力群	New	Renewed	1915	1936	2015	Hunan	Two: Party office; Secretary, Beijing Municipal Committee; State office; Mayor of the Beijing Municipal People's Government	
4	Yang Yong	杨勇	New	Not	1913	1930	1983	Hunan	One: Party office; Head, General Office of the Central Committee	
5	Yu Qiuli	余秋里	Old	Renewed	1914	1931	1999	Jiangxi	One: Military office; Head, General Political Department of the Central Military Commission	
6	Gu Mu	谷牧	Old	Resigned	1914	1932	2009	Shandong	One: Military office; Head, General Political Department of the Central Military Commission	
7	Chen Pixian	陈丕显	New	Renewed	1916	1931	2015	Fujian	One: Military office; Head, General Political Department of the Central Military Commission	
8	Hu Qili	胡启立	New	Renewed	1929	1948	Alive	Shaanxi	Two: Party office; First-ranked Secretary, Secretariat of the Central Committee; Head, General Office of the Central Committee	
9	Yao Yilin	姚依林	Old	Resigned	1917	1935	1994	Hong Kong	One: State office; Head, State Planning Commission	

==== 5th Plenary Session (1985–1987) ====
Members of the Secretariat of the 12th Central Committee of the Chinese Communist Party
Rank	Name	Hanzi	1st PLE	13th SEC	Birth	PM	Death	Birthplace	Gender	No. of offices	Ref.
1	Hu Qili	胡启立	Old	Reelected	1929	1948	Alive	Shaanxi	Male	Two: Party office; First-ranked Secretary, Secretariat of the Central Committee; Head, General Office of the Central Committee	
2	Wan Li	万里	Old	Not	1916	1933	2015	Shandong	Male	One: State office; First-ranked Vice Premier of the People's Republic of China	
3	Yu Qiuli	余秋里	Old	Not	1914	1931	1999	Jiangxi	Male	One: Military office; Head, General Political Department of the Central Military Commission	
4	Qiao Shi	乔石	5th Plenum	Reelected	1924	1940	2015	Shanghai	Male	Two: Party offices; Secretary, Standing Committee of the Central Commission for Discipline Inspection; Secretary, Central Political and Legal Affairs Commission of the Central Committee	
5	Tian Jiyun	田纪云	New	Not	1929	1945	Alive	Shandong	Male	One: State office; Vice Premier of the People's Republic of China	
6	Li Peng	李鹏	New	Not	1928	1945	2019	Shanghai	Male	Two: State offices; Vice Premier of the People's Republic of China; Director, State Education Commission	
7	Chen Pixian	陈丕显	Old	Not	1916	1931	2015	Fujian	Male	One: Military office; Head, General Political Department of the Central Military Commission	
8	Deng Liqun	邓力群	Old	Not	1915	1936	2015	Hunan	Male	Two: Party office; Secretary, Beijing Municipal Committee; State office; Mayor of the Beijing Municipal People's Government	
9	Hao Jianxiu	郝建秀	5th Plenum	Not	1935	1954	Alive	Shandong	Female	Two: Party offices; Secretary, Standing Committee of the Central Commission for Discipline Inspection; Secretary, Central Political and Legal Affairs Commission of the Central Committee	
10	Wang Zhaoguo	王兆国	New	Not	1941	1965	Alive	Hebei	Male	Two: Party offices; Secretary, Standing Committee of the Central Commission for Discipline Inspection; Secretary, Central Political and Legal Affairs Commission of the Central Committee	

=== Alternates (1982–1985) ===
Alternates of the Secretariat of the 12th Central Committee of the Chinese Communist Party
Rank	Name	Hanzi	11th SEC	13th SEC	Birth	PM	Death	Birthplace	Gender	No. of offices	Ref.
1	Qiao Shi	乔石	New	5th Plenum	1924	1940	2015	Shanghai	Male	Two: Party offices; Secretary, Standing Committee of the Central Commission for Discipline Inspection; Secretary, Central Political and Legal Affairs Commission of the Central Committee	
2	Hao Jianxiu	郝建秀	New	5th Plenum	1935	1954	Alive	Shandong	Female	Two: Party offices; Secretary, Standing Committee of the Central Commission for Discipline Inspection; Secretary, Central Political and Legal Affairs Commission of the Central Committee	

== See also ==
- 12th Politburo Standing Committee of the Chinese Communist Party
- 12th Politburo of the Chinese Communist Party
- 12th Central Committee of the Chinese Communist Party
