= The Beijing News =

Chinese Communist Party newspaper

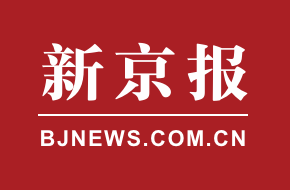
- Native name: 新京报
- Type: Daily newspaper
- Format: Tabloid (四开)
- Owner: Chinese Communist Party
- Founders: Guangming Daily Press; Nanfang Media Group
- Publisher: The Beijing News Press (新京报社)
- Founded: 11 November 2003; 22 years ago
- Political alignment: Chinese Communist Party
- Language: Chinese
- City: Beijing
- Country: China
- Website: www.bjnews.com.cn
- Free online archives: epaper.bjnews.com.cn

The Beijing News
- Simplified Chinese: 新京报
- Traditional Chinese: 新京報
- Literal meaning: New Beijing News (or New Capital News)
Transcriptions
Standard Mandarin
- Hanyu Pinyin: Xīn Jīng Bào

The Beijing News (新京报) is a daily newspaper of China owned by China's Communist Party. Co-founded by Guangming Daily and Nanfang Daily in November 2003, the newspaper was transferred to the party's Beijing Municipal Committee in September 2011.

== History ==
The Beijing News began publishing on 11 November 2003 by a joint venture of Guangming Daily Press and Nanfang Media Group (also transliterated as "Southern Newspaper Group" or Southern Daily Press Group, publisher of Southern Weekly), both owned by the sub-committees of the Chinese Communist Party (CCP), the ruling party of China since 1949. Guangming Daily Press was owned by the Central Committee while Nanfang Media Group was owned by the Guangdong provincial committee of the CCP. Initially, staff from Nanfang Media Group dominated the day-to-day operation of the newspaper, turning The Beijing News into one of Beijing's most influential newspapers.

According to Jonathan Hassid, an assistant professor (from 2015 to 2018) at Iowa State University, the two publishers had different difficulties in their publishing business. Guangming Daily had a valuable central-level administrative rank but was the country poorest major publisher, while "Nanfang" had money to invest but its administrative rank was restricting the publisher to obtain new publication number or expand outside their home province Guangdong. According to another article by Congressional-Executive Commission on China, "the Guangming Daily consistently follows the Party's line, while the Southern Daily Press Group's [sic] publications tend to be more commercially-oriented and willing to test Chinese censors".

In 2005, staff and online readers protested the sacking of the editors of the newspaper.

In July 2011, the newspaper defied the ban on reporting the Wenzhou train collision. However, in the same month, the newspaper scrapped 9 pages of special reporting.

On 1 September 2011, the newspaper was taken over by the Publicity Department of the Beijing municipal committee of the Chinese Communist Party.

In 2013, it was reported that Dai Zigeng, a publisher of the newspaper, had verbally resigned due to political pressure from the propaganda authorities.

In 2014, it was reported that the municipal Publicity Department had acquired the remaining 49% stake from Nanfang Media Group. According to Patrick Boehler of the South China Morning Post, the general public were afraid that The Beijing News would be turned into a "propaganda mouthpiece". In February 2014, The Beijing News, made a news coverage regarding Zhou Yongkang's son possible corruption, but the article was taken down from the newspaper's website.

In 2018, the merger of the newspapers The Beijing News, the Beijing Morning Post and the news website qianlong.com (千龙网) was announced. Beijing Morning Post ceased the publication in the same year.

== See also ==
- Beijing Times, another Beijing newspaper, ceased publication in 2017
- Beijing Daily Group: a publishing group that was also owned by the Beijing Municipal CCP Committee, the owner of The Beijing News. Beijing Daily Group publishes Beijing Morning Post as well as 8 other newspapers as of 2016, such as:
  - Beijing Daily
  - Beijing Evening News
