= Wei Xiaodong =

Chinese politician

- 魏小东

Chairman of the Beijing Municipal Committee of the Chinese People's Political Consultative Conference
- In office 9 January 2022 – June 2026
- Preceded by: Ji Lin

Personal details
- Born: May 1961 (age 65) Zhangzhou, Fujian, China
- Party: Chinese Communist Party
- Education: Xiamen University; Central Party School of the Chinese Communist Party

Chinese name
- Simplified Chinese: 魏小东
- Traditional Chinese: 魏小東
Transcriptions
Standard Mandarin
- Hanyu Pinyin: Wèi Xiǎodōng

Wei Xiaodong (Chinese: 魏小东; born May 1961) is a Chinese politician, who was served as the chairman of the Beijing Municipal Committee of the Chinese People's Political Consultative Conference from 2022 to 2026.

Wei was a delegate to the 12th National People's Congress. He was a representative of the 19th National Congress of the Chinese Communist Party and is a representative of the 20th National Congress of the Chinese Communist Party.

== Early life and education ==
Wei was born in Zhangzhou, Fujian, in May 1961. After resuming the college entrance examination, in 1979, he was accepted to Xiamen University, where he majored in plan statistics. He joined the Chinese Communist Party (CCP) in May 1983 upon graduation.

== Career ==
After university in 1983, Wei was assigned to the Ministry of Labor and Personnel. After the institutional reform in 1988, he worked in the Ministry of Personnel. Starting in April 1988, he served in several posts in the Central Institutional Organization Commission, including director of the Comprehensive Department, director of the Second Department, and director of the Fourth Department.

In October 2010, Wei was transferred to north China's Henan province and appointed deputy party secretary of Luoyang. He was deputy party secretary of Hebi in September 2011, in addition to serving as mayor. He was elevated to party secretary, the top political position in the city, in April 2013. In April 2015, he was chosen as party secretary of Shangqiu.

In August 2016, Wei was recalled to the Central Institutional Organization Commission and appointed deputy director of the Office.

Wei was appointed head of the Organization Department of the CCP Beijing Municipal Committee in April 2017 and was admitted to standing committee member of the CCP Beijing Municipal Committee, the city's top authority. He was named vice chairperson of the Beijing Municipal People's Congress in January 2021, concurrently serving as president of the Beijing Federation of Trade Unions. In August 2021, Wei was chosen as party branch secretary of the Beijing Municipal Committee of the Chinese People's Political Consultative Conference, in addition to serving as chairperson since January 2022.

== Investigation ==
On 6 June 2026, Wei was put under investigation for alleged "serious violations of discipline and laws" by the Central Commission for Discipline Inspection (CCDI), the party's internal disciplinary body, and the National Supervisory Commission, the highest anti-corruption agency of China. His post was removed in June 2026.

Government offices
Preceded by Ding Wei	Mayor of Hebi; 2011–2013	Succeeded by Fan Xiufang
Party political offices
Preceded by Ding Wei	Communist Party Secretary of Hebi; 2013–2015	Succeeded by Fan Xiufang
Preceded by Tao Minglun	Communist Party Secretary of Shangqiu; 2015–2016	Succeeded by Wang Zhanying
Preceded by Jiang Zhigang	Head of the Organization Department of Beijing Municipal Committee of the Chinese Communist Party; 2017–2021	Succeeded by Sun Meijun
Civic offices
Preceded by Liu Wei	President of the Beijing Federation of Trade Unions; 2021–2022	Succeeded by Zhang Yankun
Assembly seats
Preceded by Ji Lin	Chairman of the Beijing Municipal Committee of the Chinese People's Political Consultative Conference; 2022–2026	Vacant
