= Inner Mongolia Autonomous Regional Committee of the Chinese People's Political Consultative Conference =

- 13th Inner Mongolia Autonomous Regional Committee of the Chinese People's Political Consultative Conference

Type
- Type: Regional committee of the Chinese People's Political Consultative Conference
- Established: February 2, 1955; 71 years ago

Leadership
- Chairman: Zhang Yankun
- Vice Chairpersons: See list: Luo Zhihu; Tsetseg; Wei Guonan; An Runsheng; Zhang Lei; Zhang Baicheng; Yang Jie; Sun Junqing
- Secretary-General: Yang Limin

Website
- www.nmgzx.gov.cn

Inner Mongolia Autonomous Regional Committee of the Chinese People's Political Consultative Conference

Chinese name
- Traditional Chinese: 中國人民政治協商會議內蒙古自治區委員會
- Simplified Chinese: 中国人民政治协商会议内蒙古自治区委员会
Transcriptions
Standard Mandarin
- Hanyu Pinyin: Zhōngguó Rénmín Zhèngzhì Xiéshāng Huìyì Nèiměnggǔ Zìzhìqū Wěiyuánhuì

Abbreviation
- Traditional Chinese: 內蒙古自治區政協
- Simplified Chinese: 内蒙古自治区政协
- Literal meaning: CPPCC Inner Mongolia Autonomous Regional Committee
Transcriptions
Standard Mandarin
- Hanyu Pinyin: Nèiměnggǔ Zìzhìqū Zhèngxié

Mongolian name
- Mongolian script: ᠳᠤᠮᠳᠠᠳᠤ ᠤᠯᠤᠰ ᠤᠨ; ᠠᠷᠡᠤᠨ ᠤᠨ ᠤᠯᠤᠰ; ᠲᠥᠷᠥ ᠶᠢᠨ ᠵᠦᠪᠯᠡᠯᠬᠡᠨ ᠤ; ᠥᠪᠥᠷ ᠮᠣᠩᠭᠣᠯ ᠤᠨ; ᠥᠪᠡᠷᠲᠡᠭᠡᠨ ᠵᠠᠰᠠᠬᠤ; ᠣᠷᠣᠨ ᠤ ᠬᠣᠷᠢᠶ᠎ᠠ

The Inner Mongolia Autonomous Region Committee of the Chinese People's Political Consultative Conference is the regional branch of the Chinese People's Political Consultative Conference in the Inner Mongolia Autonomous Region, China.

== History ==
In 1947, the Inner Mongolia Provisional Senate (内蒙古临时参议会) was established, which was the predecessor of the CPPCC Inner Mongolia Autonomous Region Committee. The CPPCC Inner Mongolia Autonomous Region Committee was officially established on February 2, 1955.

== Term ==
=== 1st ===
- Term: February 1955 – March 1959
- Chairperson: Yang Zhilin
- Vice Chairpersons: Jiyatai, Sun Lanfeng, Temurbagan, Chen Bingqian

=== 2nd ===
- Term: March 1959 – May 1965
- Chairperson: Yang Zhilin
- Vice Chairpersons: Jiyatai, Sun Lanfeng, Li Shijie, Peng Sike

=== 3rd ===
- Term: May 1965 – December 1977
- Chairperson: Ulanhu
- Vice Chairpersons: Jiyatai, Sun Lanfeng, Li Shijie, Kerigen, Temurbagan, Wu Daping

=== 4th ===
- Term: December 1977 – April 1983
- Chairperson: You Taizhong (– December 1979) → Kuibi (December 1979 –)
- Vice Chairpersons: Kuibi, Kerigen, Wang Zaitian, Sun Lanfeng, Liu Huaxiang, Kong Fei, Li Shijie, Peng Sike, Huang Jujun, Zhou Beifeng, Eqirhuyaktu, Yang Lingde, Zhang Rongzhen, Tan Zhenxiong, Wu Daping (December 1979 –), Zhao Zhanshan (December 1979 –), Zhao Yunshi (December 1979 –), Naqinshuangheer (December 1979 –), Wang Jiangong (December 1979 –), Hu Zhongda (December 1979 –), Qi Yongcun (December 1979 –), Liang Yiming (December 1979 –), Wang Haishan (December 1979 –), Wei Zhaorong (December 1979 –), Li Sen (April 1982 –)

=== 5th ===
- Term: April 1983 – June 1988
- Chairperson: Shi Shengrong
- Vice Chairpersons: Chen Bingyu, Wuligeng, Yang Lingde, Naqinshuangheer, Han Ming, Wei Zhaorong, Ma Zhenduo, Li Shuyuan, Liu Zhenyi, Baoyanbatu, Yun Zhaoguang

=== 6th ===
- Term: June 1988 – May 1993
- Chairperson: Shi Shengrong
- Vice Chairpersons: Yun Zhaoguang, Yun Shufen, Wang Chongren, Wuligeng, Ulan, Lan Qianfu, Li Shuyuan, Zhang Shunzhen, Chen Jie, Qizhongyi, Tuke, Han Ming, Baoyanbatu, Zhou Junqiu (May 1991 –), Naideng (April 1992 –)

=== 7th ===
- Term: May 1993 – January 1998
- Chairperson: Qian Fenyong
- Vice Chairpersons: Zhang Zuocai, Naideng, Wang Chongren, Chen Jie, Lan Qianfu, Ulan, Qizhongyi, Zhang Shunzhen, Yuan Mingduo, Geriletu, Wulunsai, Xia Ri, Yang Zizhen, Chen Youzun, Xu Bainian, Tan Bowen (January 1997 –)

=== 8th ===
- Term: January 1998 – January 2003
- Chairperson: Qian Fenyong
- Vice Chairpersons: Feng Qin, Naideng, Tan Bowen, Ulan, Geriletu, Xia Ri, Xu Bainian, Luo Xien, Qi Yingcheng, Gai Shanlin, Li Shichen

=== 9th ===
- Term: January 2003 – January 2008
- Chairperson: Wang Zhan
- Vice Chairpersons: Fu Shouzheng, Bao Junchen, Ulan (deceased 2004), Xu Bainian, Luo Xien, Qi Yingcheng, Gai Shanlin, Liu Zhilan, Han Zhenxiang, Wu Baoheng

=== 10th ===
- Term: January 2008 – January 2013
- Chairperson: Chen Guanglin
- Vice Chairpersons: Guo Ziming, Yun Feng, Han Zhenxiang, Wang Changju, Qiqige, Dong Hengyu, Zheng Futian, Niu Guangming, Xiao Lisheng, Fu Laiwang (January 2010 –)
- Secretary-General: Chen Yimin

=== 11th ===
- Term: January 2013 – January 2018
- Chairperson: Ren Yaping
- Vice Chairpersons: Han Zhiran, Guo Qijun, Dong Hengyu, Zheng Futian, Niu Guangming, Yang Chengwang, Chen Yu, Chang Hai, Liang Tiecheng
- Secretary-General: Wang Zhicheng

=== 12th ===
- Term: January 2018 – January 2023
- Chairperson: Li Jia (– January 2019) → Li Xiuling (January 2019 –)
- Vice Chairpersons: Wang Zhonghe (– January 2021), Dong Hengyu, Zheng Futian, Luo Zhihu, Liu Xinle, Ma Ming (– January 2020), Chang Junzheng (– January 2021), Zhang Hua, Qiqige, Wei Guonan (January 2020 –), Ma Xuejun (January 2021 –), Ouyang Xiaohui (January 2021 –)
- Secretary-General: Wei Jun (– January 2019) → Di Ruiming (January 2019 –)

=== 13th ===
- Term: January 2023 – 2028
- Chairperson: Zhang Yankun
- Vice Chairpersons: Luo Zhihu, Qiqige, Wei Guonan, An Runsheng, Zhang Lei, Zhang Baicheng, Yang Jie, Sun Junqing ( – July 2024), Yang Weidong (February 2024 – October 2025)
- Secretary-General: Yang Limin
