= 14th Secretariat of the Chinese Communist Party =

Chinese government body

The 14th Secretariat, formally the Secretariat of the 14th Central Committee of the Communist Party of China, was nominated by the 14th Politburo Standing Committee and approved by the first plenary session of the 14th Central Committee on 19 October 1992, in the aftermath of the 14th National Congress of the Chinese Communist Party (CCP). This electoral term was preceded by the 13th Secretariat and succeeded by the 15th in 1997.

== General Secretary of the Central Committee ==
General Secretary of the 14th Central Committee of the Chinese Communist Party
Portrait	Name	Hanzi	Birth	PM	Death	Ref.
	Jiang Zemin	江泽民	1926	1946	2022	

== Composition ==
Members of the Secretariat of the 14th Central Committee of the Chinese Communist Party
Rank	Name	Hanzi	13th SEC	15th SEC	Birth	PM	Death	Birthplace	No. of offices	Ref.
1	Hu Jintao	胡锦涛	New	Reelected	1942	1964	Alive	Jiangsu	Three: Party offices; President, Central Party School of the Central Committee; Military offices; Vice Chairman, Central Military Commission; State offices; Vice President of the People's Republic of China	
2	Ding Guangen	丁关根	Old	Reelected	1929	1956	2012	Jiangsu	One: Party office; Head, Publicity Department of the Central Committee	
3	Wei Jianxing	尉健行	New	Reelected	1931	1949	2015	Zhejiang	Two: Party office; Secretary, Beijing Municipal Committee; State office; Mayor of the Beijing Municipal People's Government	
4	Wen Jiabao	温家宝	Alternate	Reelected	1942	1965	Alive	Tianjin	One: Party office; Head, General Office of the Central Committee	
5	Ren Jianxin	任建新	New	Not	1925	1948	Alive	Shanxi	Two: Party office; Secretary, Central Political and Legal Affairs Commission; State office; President, Supreme People's Court	
6	Wu Bangguo (Note: Wu Bangguo and Jiang Chunyun were elected to the Secretariat by a decision of the 4th plenary session of the 14th Central Committee on 25–28 September 1994.)	吴邦国	New	Not	1941	1964	Alive	Anhui	Three: Party office; Secretary, Shanghai Municipal Committee; State office; Vice Premier of the People's Republic of China; Mayor of the Shanghai Municipal People's Government	
7	Jiang Chunyun	姜春云	New	Not	1930	1947	2021	Shandong	One: Party office; Secretary, Shandong Provincial Party Committee	

== See also ==
- 14th Politburo Standing Committee of the Chinese Communist Party
- 14th Politburo of the Chinese Communist Party
- 14th Central Committee of the Chinese Communist Party
