= Frontline (Chinese journal) =

Chinese political journal

- Editor: CCP Beijing Municipal Committee
- Categories: Political magazine
- First issue: 1958
- Country: China
- Based in: Beijing
- ISSN: 0529-1445

Founded in 1958, the Frontline (Chinese: 前线) is a monthly political journal in China, with its editorial office located in Beijing.

== History ==
In September 1961, Frontier started a column called "Notes from Sanjia Village" in order to "enrich the content", "enliven the atmosphere", and "improve the quality" of the magazine. The column was co-authored by Deng Tuo, deputy secretary of the CCP Beijing Municipal Committee, Wu Han, deputy mayor of Beijing, and Liao Mosha, head of the United Front Work Department of the Beijing Municipal Committee.

In 2018, Frontline was recognized by the Department of Newspapers and Periodicals of the State Administration of Press, Publication, Radio, Film and Television of the People's Republic of China as one of the country's "Top 100 Newspapers and Periodicals" in 2017.
