= Greenland Hotel =

- 格林蘭大酒店
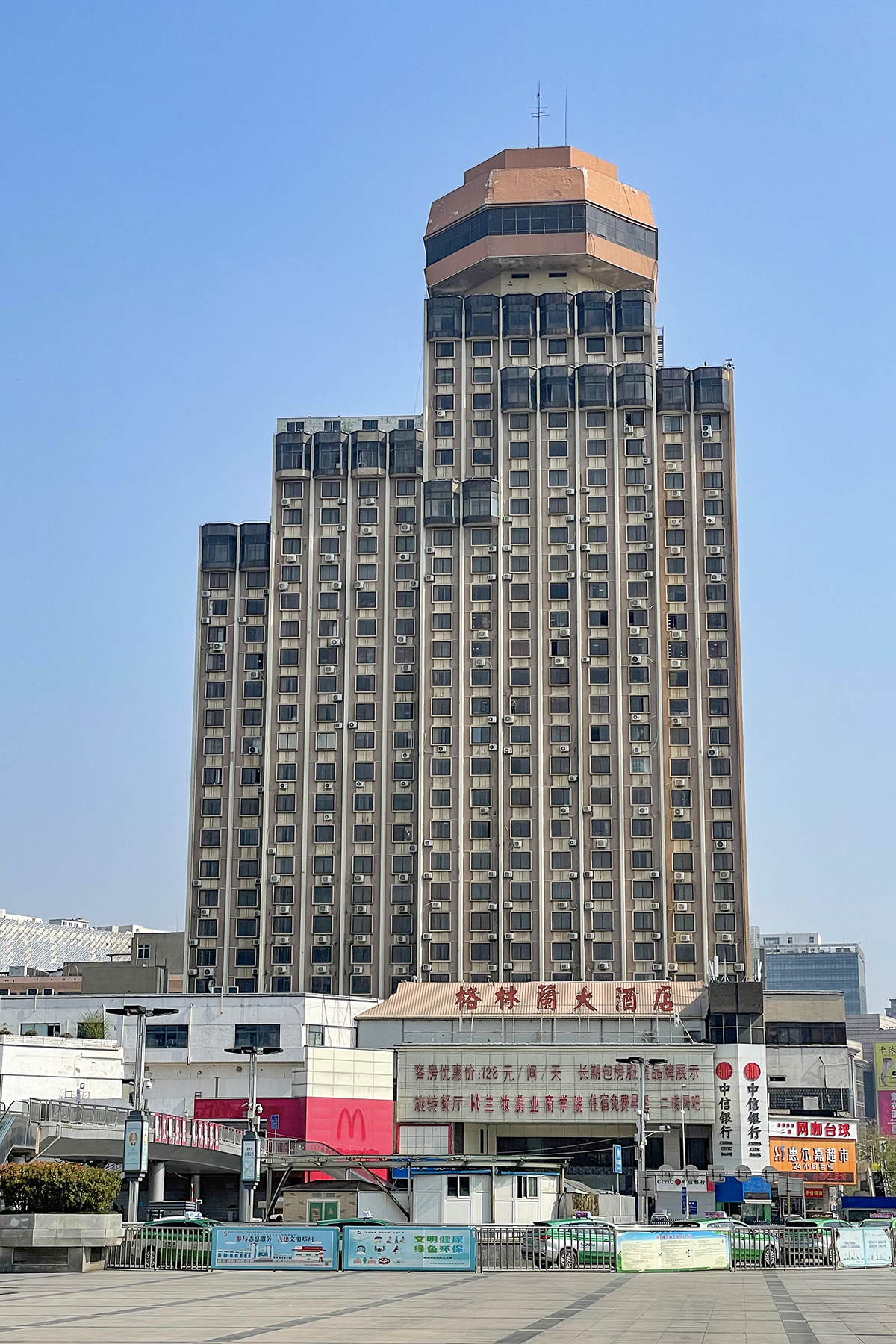
- Interactive map of the Greenland Hotel area
- Former names: 黄和平大厦

General information
- Type: Hotel
- Location: Datong Road No. 93, Erqi District, Zhengzhou City, Henan Province, China
- Coordinates: 34°44′47.95″N 113°39′25.75″E
- Construction started: 1986
- Completed: 1988
- Opened: 1988

Height
- Height: 114.5 metres (375.7 ft)
- Roof: 114.5 metres (375.7 ft)

Technical details
- Floor count: 35 floors above ground, 2 floors underground
- Floor area: 50,900 square metres (548,000 sq ft)
- Lifts/elevators: 7

Design and construction
- Architecture firm: Zhengzhou City Architectural Design Institute
- Main contractor: Second Construction Engineering Company of Shangqiu Area

The Greenland Hotel (Traditional Chinese: 格林蘭大酒店; Simplified Chinese: 格林兰大酒店) is a building located in Erqi District, Zhengzhou City, Henan Province, on Datong Road near the east station of Zhengzhou Railway Station, with a height of 114.5 meters. It was completed in 1988 and was the first building in Zhengzhou over 100 meters tall, also being the tallest building in Zhengzhou at the time.

== Architectural design ==
Greenland Hotel was designed by Zhengzhou City Architectural Design Institute, covering an area of 8907 square meters, divided into a main building and an annex. The main building has 35 floors above ground and 2 underground, reaching a height of 114.5 meters, while the annex has 4 floors above ground and 1 below, with a height of 19.3 meters. The main building uses a box-type foundation with reinforced concrete shear wall structure, and is earthquake-resistant up to level 7. The annex is a cast-in-place reinforced concrete frame structure. There are escalators between the main building and the annex, and the building is equipped with 7 high-speed elevators and an automatic firefighting system. The 32nd floor of the main building houses a revolving restaurant.

== History ==
Greenland Hotel was originally called Huang Heping Plaza (黄和平大厦), started in January 1986, topped off in September 1987, and completed in June 1988, standing at 113.6 meters tall at the time as the tallest building in Zhengzhou, known as "the tallest building north of the Yangtze River". The annex originally housed the Huang He Ping Shopping Center, which opened on February 10, 1988, and was at that time the largest shopping center in Zhengzhou. Due to poor management, the hotel was closed in October 1998 and reopened at the end of 2004.

In December 2018, Greenland Hotel was listed as one of the first batch of historic buildings in Zhengzhou City.

== Transportation ==
The Greenland Hotel is located south of the East Plaza of Zhengzhou Station. The bus harbor on the south side of the East Plaza serves as the starting point for more than ten routes of Zhengzhou Bus.
