= Li Zhijian (politician) =

Chinese politician (1940–2016)

Li Zhijian (August 1940 – March 29, 2016, Chinese: 李志坚), native from Xi'an, Shaanxi Province, is a political leader of the People's Republic of China. He served as the party secretary and deputy director of the General Administration of Sport of China, as well as the president of the All-China Sports Federation.

== Biography ==
Li Zhijian completed his studies in Industrial Economics at the Department of Industrial Economics, Renmin University of China, in September 1961, and became a member of the Chinese Communist Party (CCP) in October 1961. In September 1964, he assumed a teaching position in the Department of Industrial Economics at Renmin University. From January 1971 until November 1984, he held positions as a reporter for Beijing Daily, deputy director of the Commerce and Industry Department, director of the Commentary Department, director of the Theory Department, and deputy editor-in-chief. In December 1984, he was named deputy director of the Publicity Department of the CCP Beijing Municipal Committee. In March 1987, he was designated as the secretary of the CCP Daxing County Committee. In December 1987, he was appointed a member of the standing committee of the Beijing Municipal Committee and Secretary of the Daxing County Committee; in September 1988, he became a member of the standing committee of the CCP Beijing Municipal Committee and director of the Publicity Department.

In April 2000, he assumed the role of secretary of the Party Group and deputy director of the General Administration of Sport of China. In November 2005, he was appointed Chairman of the National Sports Federation, and on January 20, 2006, he became Honorary Chairman of the National Sports Federation. He served as a member of the Central Steering Committee for the Construction of Spiritual Civilization and as vice-chairman of the Beijing Organizing Committee for the Olympic Games. In March 2008, he assumed the role of vice-chairman of the Education, Science, Culture and Health Committee of the Eleventh National People's Congress.

He died at the age of 76 on March 29, 2016, at the Beijing Friendship Hospital.
