= 11th Secretariat of the Chinese Communist Party =

Chinese government body

The 11th Secretariat, formally the Secretariat of the 11th Central Committee of the Communist Party of China, was nominated by the 11th Politburo Standing Committee and approved by the 5th Plenary Session of the 11th Central Committee on 29 February 1980. The 5th Plenary Session re-established the Secretariat, which had last existed in the period 1956–1969 during the 8th Central Committee. This electoral term was succeeded by the 12th in 1982.

== Secretary-General of the Central Committee ==
General Secretary of the 11th Central Committee
Portrait	Name	Hanzi	Birth	PM	Death	Ref.
	Hu Yaobang	胡耀邦	1915	1933	1989	

== Composition ==
Members of the Secretariat of the 11th Central Committee
Rank	Name	Hanzi	12th SEC	Birth	PM	Death	Birthplace	No. of offices	Ref.
1	Wan Li	万里	Reelected	1916	1933	2015	Shandong	One: State office; First-ranked Vice Premier of the People's Republic of China	
2	Wang Renzhong	王任重	Not	1917	1933	1992	Hebei	One: Party office; Head, Publicity Department of the Central Committee	
3	Fang Yi	方毅	Not	1916	1931	1997	Fujian	Three: State offices; Vice Premier of the People's Republic of China; Director, State Science and Technology Commission; President, Chinese Academy of Sciences	
4	Gu Mu	谷牧	Reelected	1914	1932	2009	Shandong	One: State office; First-ranked Vice Premier of the People's Republic of China	
5	Song Renqiong	宋任穷	Not	1909	1926	2005	Hunan	One: Party office; Head, Organisation Department of the Central Committee	
6	Yu Qiuli	余秋里	Reelected	1914	1931	1999	Jiangxi	One: State office; Vice Premier of the People's Republic of China	
7	Yang Dezhi	杨得志	Not	1911	1931	1994	Hunan	One: Military office; Head, General Staff Department of the Central Military Commission	
8	Hu Qiaomu	胡乔木	Not	1912	1932	1992	Jiangsu	One: State office; President, Chinese Academy of Social Sciences	
9	Hu Yaobang	胡耀邦	Not	1915	1933	1989	Hunan	One: Party office; Secretary-General, Central Committee	
10	Yao Yilin	姚依林	Reelected	1917	1935	1994	Hong Kong	One: State office; Head, State Planning Commission	
11	Peng Chong	彭冲	Not	1915	1934	2010	Fujian	One: State office; Vice Chairperson, Standing Committee of the National People's Congress	
12	Xi Zhongxun (Note: Xi Zhongxun was elected to the Secretariat by a decision of the 6th Plenary Session of the 11th Central Committee on 29 June 1981.)	习仲勋	Reelected	1913	1928	2002	Shaanxi	One: State office; Vice Chairperson, Standing Committee of the National People's Congress	

== See also ==
- 11th Politburo Standing Committee of the Chinese Communist Party
- 11th Politburo of the Chinese Communist Party
- 11th Central Committee of the Chinese Communist Party
