= Beijing Municipal Archives Bureau =

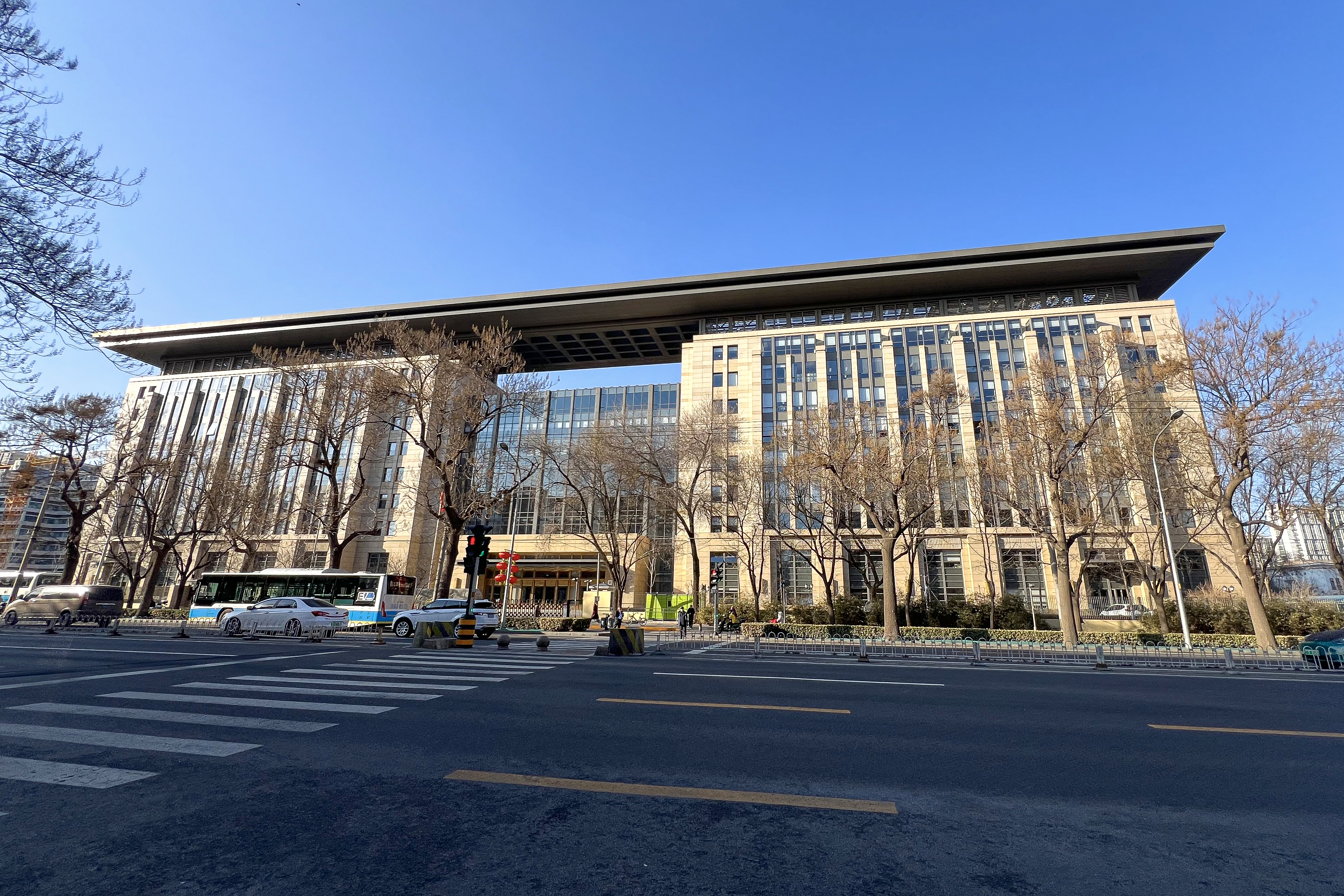
New Building of Beijing Municipal Archives Bureau

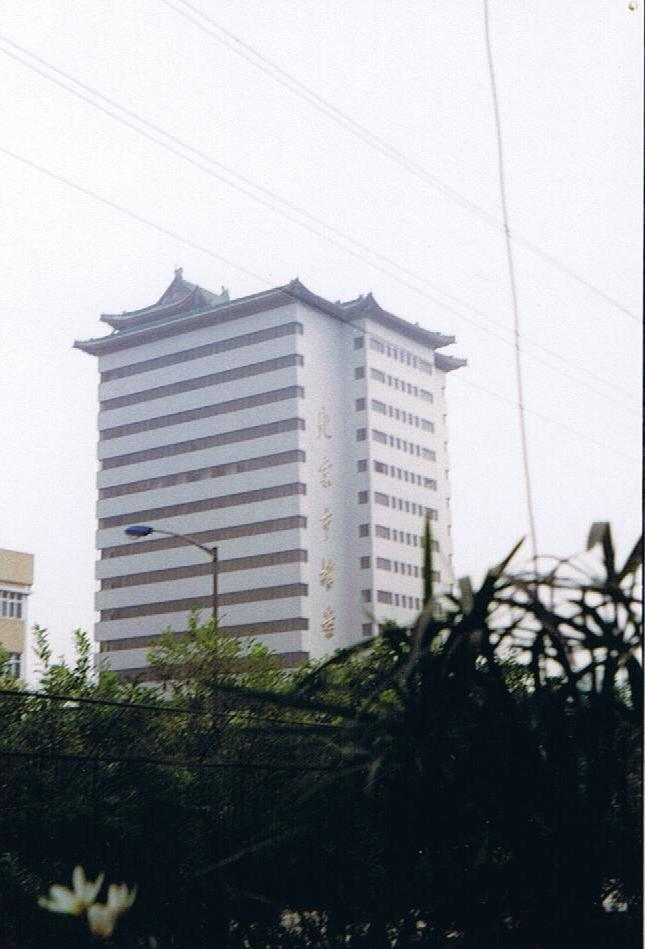
Former Building of Beijing Municipal Archives Bureau

Co-located with the Beijing Municipal Archives, the Beijing Municipal Archives Bureau (北京市档案局) is the city of Beijing's archive administration.

== History ==
On December 15, 1959, the Beijing Municipal Bureau of Archives was formally founded. The Beijing Municipal Bureau of Archives is the city's archive administration. It oversees and manages the archival cause of the city and is responsible for all aspects of planning, organizing, and coordinating it as well as for system unification, supervision, and direction. At the moment, the Beijing Municipal Archives and the Beijing Municipal Archives Bureau share a single location.

Opening day for the Beijing Municipal Archives was April 1958. Early on in its construction, the Beijing Municipal Archives' location was moved many times before settling at 42 Puhuangyu Road in the Fengtai District in October 1995.

Beijing Municipal Archives is a national-level repository for Chinese Communist Party and government archives of Beijing, large-scale state-owned enterprises and institutions, and the public's access to information from the Beijing Municipal People's Government. It also collects, stores, and uses these archives for long-term and permanent preservation.

With two levels below ground and fifteen above, the Beijing Municipal Archives, at No. 42 Puhuangyu Road, spans more than 18,300 square meters. In addition to photos, audio and video recordings, electronic archives, physical artifacts, and electronic documents, the collection mostly comprises paper documents and archives. A grant from the Ming dynasty's 12th year of Jiajing (1533) is the oldest archive. About half of the collection's total number of archives date from the Republic of China era.

The Beijing Automobile Manufacturing Plant factory was located at No. 31 Nanmofang Road in Chaoyang District, where the new Beijing Municipal Archives opened on June 9, 2019.
