= Zhang Yankun =

Chinese politician

- 张延昆

Chairman of the Inner Mongolia Autonomous Regional Committee of the Chinese People's Political Consultative Conference
- Incumbent
- Assumed office 15 January 2023
- Preceded by: Li Xiuling

Personal details
- Born: January 1963 (age 63) Fangcheng County, Henan, China
- Party: Chinese Communist Party
- Education: Central Party School of the Chinese Communist Party

Chinese name
- Simplified Chinese: 张延昆
- Traditional Chinese: 張延昆
Transcriptions
Standard Mandarin
- Hanyu Pinyin: Zhāng Yánkūn

Zhang Yankun (Chinese: 张延昆; born January 1963) is a Chinese politician, serving as chairman of the Inner Mongolia Autonomous Regional Committee of the Chinese People's Political Consultative Conference since January 2023.

Zhang was a representative of the 18th and 19th National Congress of the Chinese Communist Party. He is a member of the 14th National Committee of the Chinese People's Political Consultative Conference.

== Career ==
Zhang was born in Fangcheng County, Henan, in January 1963. He joined the Chinese Communist Party (CCP) in April 1985, and entered the workforce in August of the same year. He worked for a long time in northwest China's Xinjiang Uyghur Autonomous Region in his early years.

After being transferred to Beijing, Zhang was deputy party secretary of Huairou County (now Huairou District) and subsequently governor of Huairou District in May 2002. He became governor of Shunyi District, in October 2006, and then party secretary, the top political position in the district, beginning in March 2009. He was appointed vice mayor of Beijing in January 2013, concurrently serving as deputy secretary of the Political and Legal Affairs Commission of the CCP Beijing Municipal Committee. He rose to secretary of the Political and Legal Affairs Commission in October 2015 and was admitted to standing committee member of the CCP Beijing Municipal Committee, the province's top authority. He was deputy party secretary of Beijing in November 2020, in addition to serving as president of the CCP Beijing Municipal Party School. In January 2022, he was chosen as vice chairperson of the Beijing Municipal People's Congress. In August 2022, he was proposed as president of the Beijing Federation of Trade Unions, succeeding Wei Xiaodong.

In January 2023, Zhang assumed the position of chairman of the Inner Mongolia Autonomous Regional Committee of the Chinese People's Political Consultative Conference, the regional advisory body.

Government offices
Preceded by Dai Jingzhu	Governor of Huairou District; 2002–2006	Succeeded by Chi Weisheng
Preceded by Li Ping	Governor of Shunyi District; 2006–2009	Succeeded by Liu Jian
Party political offices
Preceded by Xia Zhanyi	Communist Party Secretary of Shunyi District; 2009–2013	Succeeded by Wang Gang
Preceded by Yang Xiaochao	Secretary of the Political and Legal Affairs Commission of the Beijing Municipal Committee of the Chinese Communist Party; 2015–2020	Succeeded by Qi Jing
Preceded by Jing Junhai	Specifically-designated Deputy Communist Party Secretary of Beijing; 2020–2022	Succeeded by Yin Yong
Civic offices
Preceded by Wei Xiaodong	President of the Beijing Federation of Trade Unions; 2022–2023	Succeeded by Qi Jing
Assembly seats
Preceded by Li Xiuling	Chairman of the Inner Mongolia Autonomous Regional Committee of the Chinese People's Political Consultative Conference; 2023–present	Incumbent
