= Beijing Federation of Trade Unions =

The Beijing Federation of Trade Unions (Chinese: 北京市总工会) is the leading organ of local trade unions and industrial unions in Beijing and was established in 1950.

== History ==
On February 7, 1949, at a meeting of Beiping workers to commemorate the 26th anniversary of the February 7th Strike, the Preparatory Committee of Changxindian Railway Workers' Union and more than 30 other workers' groups initiated the establishment of the Preparatory Committee of the Beiping General Confederation of Trade Unions, of which Xiao Ming (Chinese: 萧明) was the director. In February 1950, the first congress of the Beijing Trade Union was held and formally established, with Peng Zhen, the secretary of the Beijing Municipal Committee of the Chinese Communist Party, being elected as the first chairman of the Federation of Trade Unions.

The fifteenth Congress of the Beijing Trade Union convened on May 8, 2024.
