= Tao Minglun =

Chinese politician

Tao Minglun (born May 1963, Chinese: 陶明伦), a native of Biyang County, Henan Province, is a Chinese politician.

== Biography ==
In March 2008, he was appointed deputy secretary of the CCP Shangqiu Municipal Committee and mayor of Shangqiu. In March 2011, he assumed the role of secretary of the CCP Shangqiu Municipal Party Committee. In April 2015, he was appointed as a member of the Standing Committee of the CCP Henan Provincial Committee and served as the Minister of the United Front Work Department.

In November 2017, he was appointed to the Standing Committee and served as Secretary General of the CPC Anhui Provincial Committee. From February to March 2020, he briefly served concurrently as the Minister of the United Front Work Department of the CPC Anhui Provincial Committee. In June 2020, he was designated as the Minister of the Publicity Department of the CCP Anhui Provincial Committee.

In November 2021, he assumed the role of Deputy Secretary of the Party Group of the Standing Committee of the Anhui Provincial People's Congress (Chinese: 安徽省人民代表大会常务委员会) and Deputy Director. In January 2023, he was re-elected to the 14th Anhui Provincial People's Congress.

Party political offices
Previous: Yu Aihua	Minister of the Publicity Department, the CCP Anhui Provincial Committee	Next: Guo Qiang
Previous: Liu Li (politician)	Minister of the Unified Front Work Department, the CCP Anhui Provincial Committee	Next: Zhang Ximing
Previous: Tang Chengpei	Secretary-General of the CCP Anhui Provincial Committee	Next: Guo Qiang
Previous: Shi Jichun	Minister of the Unified Front Work Department, the CCP Henan Provincial Committee	Next: Sun Shougang
Previous: Wang Baocun	Secretary of the CCP Shangqiu Municipal Committee	Next: Wei Xiaodong
Government offices
Previous: Wang Baocun	Mayor of Shangqiu Municipal People's Government	Next: Yu Xueyou
