= Zheng Weimin =

Chinese engineer

- Born: March 1946 (age 80); Ningbo, Zhejiang, China
- Education: Tsinghua University
- Scientific career
- Fields: Computer architecture
- Workplaces: Tsinghua University
- Notable students: Yin Yong

Chinese name
- Traditional Chinese: 鄭偉民
- Simplified Chinese: 郑纬民
Transcriptions
Standard Mandarin
- Hanyu Pinyin: Zhèng Wěimín

Zheng Weimin (Chinese: 郑纬民; born March 1946) is a Chinese engineer specializing in computer architecture. He is a professor at Tsinghua University and formerly served as its director of High Performance Computing Institute between 2000 and 2008.

== Biography ==
Zheng was born in the town of Dongqianhu in Ningbo, Zhejiang, in March 1946, during the Republic of China. He attended Qianhu Middle School (now Dongqianhu Tourism Middle School). He secondary studied at Hengxi High School (now Zhengshi High School). In 1965 he was accepted to Tsinghua University, where he graduated in 1970. After university, he taught there. He was a researcher at Stony Brook University from 1985 to 1986 and then University of Southampton from 1989 to 1991. He once served as president of China Computer Federation (CCF).

== Honours and awards ==
- 2002 State Science and Technology Progress Award (First Class)
- 2007 State Science and Technology Progress Award (Second Class)
- 2008 State Science and Technology Progress Award (Second Class)
- 2009 Science and Technology Progress Award by Ministry of Education (First Class)
- December 2015 State Technological Invention Award (Second Class)
- 2016 Science and Technology Progress Award of the Ho Leung Ho Lee Foundation
- November 22, 2019 Member of the Chinese Academy of Engineering (CAE)
