= Xiaolou Mosque =

Mosque in Zhengzhou, Henan, China

- 小楼清真寺
- Location of the mosque in Henan

Religion
- Affiliation: Sunni Islam
- Ecclesiastical or organisational status: Mosque
- Status: Active

Location
- Location: Erqi, Zhengzhou, Henan
- Country: China
- Interactive map of Xiaolou Mosque
- Coordinates: 34°45′11″N 113°39′48″E

Architecture
- Type: Mosque
- Completed: 1920s (original); 1979 (rebuilt)
- Site area: 4,000 m^{2} (43,000 sq ft)

The Xiaolou Mosque (simplified Chinese: 小楼清真寺; traditional Chinese: 小樓清真寺; pinyin: Xiǎolóu Qīngzhēnsì) is a mosque in Erqi District, Zhengzhou, in the Henan province of China.

== Overview ==
Zhengzhou is home to a large number of Chinese Muslims who can trace their ancestries from traders, militia and officials who arrived in Henan during the Tang dynasty in the 7th century.

The mosque was constructed in the 1920s, was rebuilt in 1979, and was renovated in 1984. The five-story building covers 4,000 square metres (43,000 sq ft) and includes a school that teaches Arabic.

== Transportation ==
The mosque is accessible within walking distance north of Zhengzhou railway station.

== See also ==
Xiaolou Mosque
- Traditional Chinese: 小樓清真寺
- Simplified Chinese: 小楼清真寺
Transcriptions
Standard Mandarin
- Hanyu Pinyin: Xiǎolóu Qīngzhēnsì

- Islam in China
- List of mosques in China
