= Beijing Municipal Bureau of Culture and Tourism =

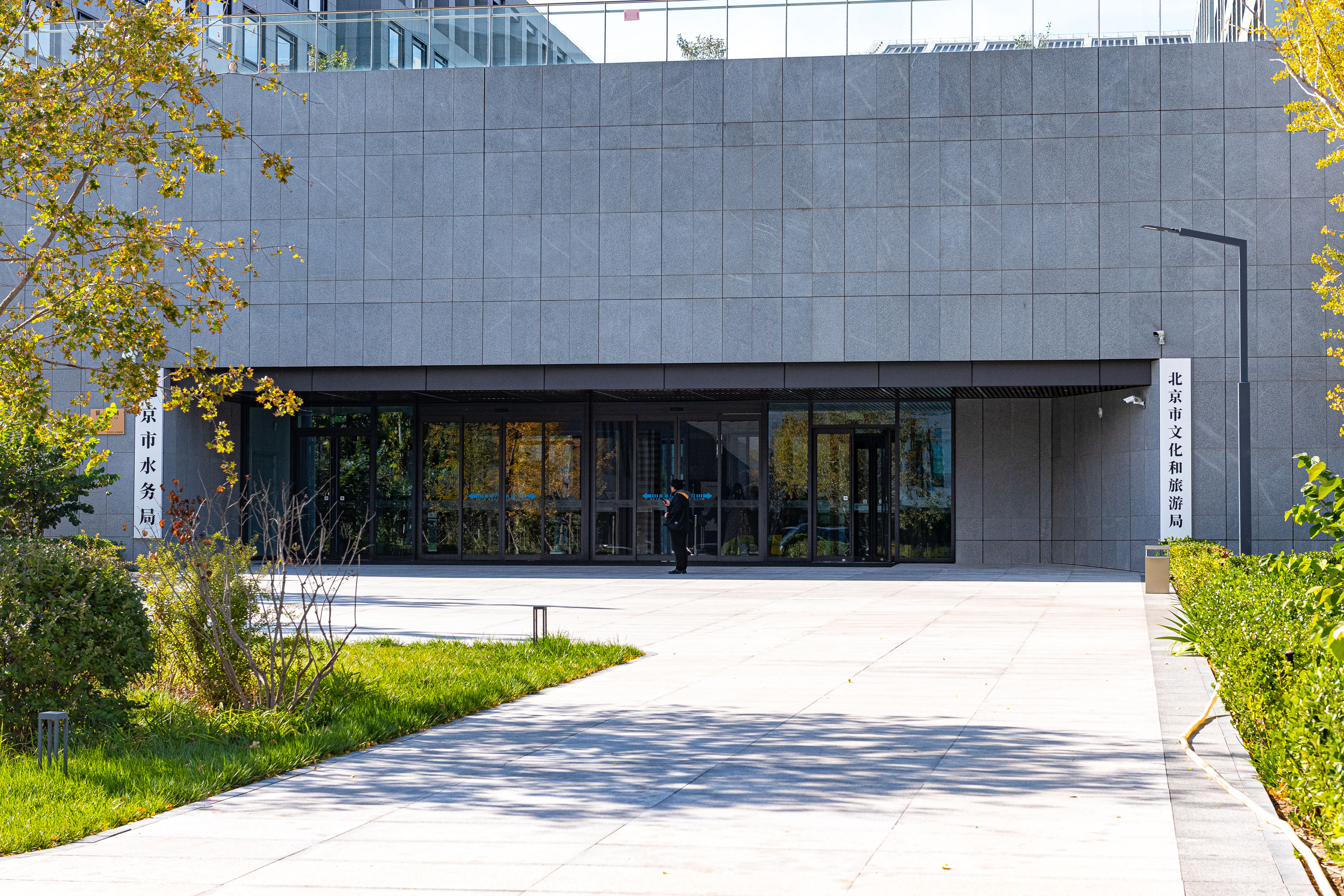
Headquarters

Beijing Municipal Bureau of Culture and Tourism (Chinese: 北京市文化和旅游局; pinyin: Běijīng Shì Wénhuà hé Lǚyóu Jú) is an agency of the Beijing Municipal People's Government which sets policies and laws relating to the arts and Chinese culture, implementing plans for the cultural development of the city. The agency is responsible for the management of the cultural market and its development in Beijing.

It operates the city's public libraries by guiding the collection and use of Books and promoting literature resources, along with the distribution of movies, audio products and other forms of entertainment.
