= Li Zhijian (physicist) =

Chinese physicist

- Traditional Chinese: 李志堅
- Simplified Chinese: 李志坚
Transcriptions
Standard Mandarin
- Hanyu Pinyin: Lǐ Zhìjiān

Li Zhijian (Chinese: 李志坚; 1928–2011) was a Chinese physicist. He was a pioneer of Chinese microelectronics. He was former Chief Director of the Institute of Microelectronics, Tsinghua University; and the ex-Chairman of the Academic Committee, School of Information Science and Technology, Tsinghua University.

Li giving a lecture

== Life ==
Li was born on 1 May 1928, in Ningbo, Zhejiang Province. In 1951, he graduated from the Department of Physics, Zhejiang University in Hangzhou with a bachelor's degree. He went to study mathematics and physics in the USSR and was awarded a Science Doctorand by the USSR National University of Leningrad (now known as St. Petersburg State University, Russia).

Li later became a professor of Tsinghua University and held the chief-director position of the institute of Microelectronics for a long period. He was the chairman of the Academic Committee of the Information Science and Technology School, Tsinghua University. He was also Vice-president of the Institute of Electronics, Chinese Academy of Sciences; and the Vice-chairman of the Chinese semiconductor and Integrated Circuits Technology Association.

Li was active at many international academic meetings, serving many times as the meeting-president, member of meeting commission in many international conferences including the International Conference on Solid State Device and Integrated Circuit Technology (ICSICT; 93, 95), Solid State Material and Device Meeting (SSDM; 95, 96, 97, 98) and IEEE Regional Conferences.

== Death ==
Li died of illness in Beijing at 4:30 pm on 2 May 2011.

== Positions ==
- 1999–, Member, Third World Academy of Sciences
- 1991–, Academician, Chinese Academy of Sciences
- Chief Director, Institute of Microelectronics, Tsinghua University
- Chairman of the Academic Committee, School of Information Science and Technology, Tsinghua University
- Vice-president, Institute of Electronics, Chinese Academy of Science
- Vice-chairman, Chinese semiconductor and Integrated Circuits Technology Association
- Member, Editorial Board, Electronic Sinica
