= Great Strike of February 7 =

Strike of Peking-Hankow Railway workers in February 1923

Great Strike of February 7th Peking-Hankow Railway Workers Great Strike
- Part of the first labor movement upsurge in China
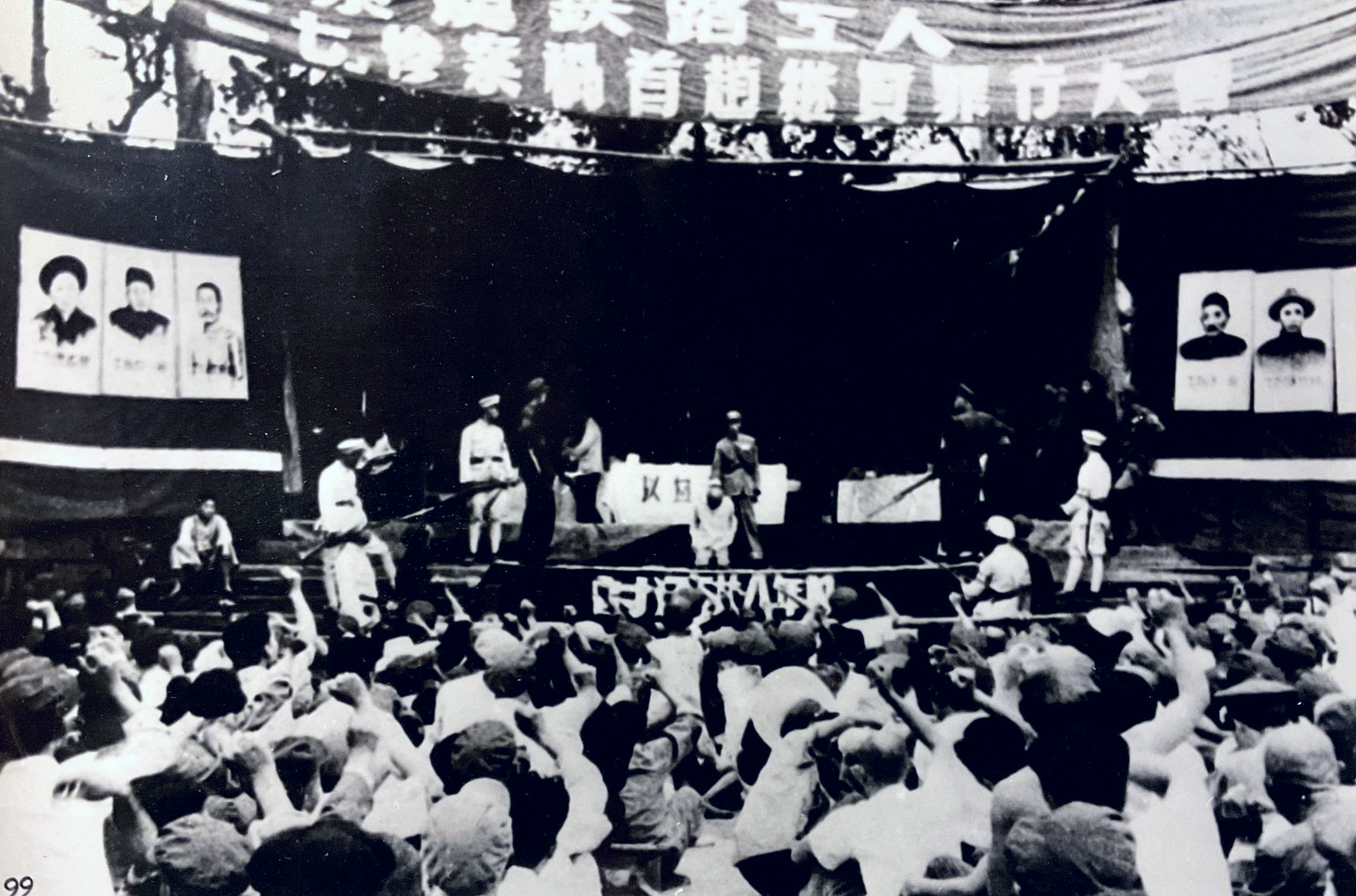
- After the founding of New China, in July 1951, a public trial sentenced Zhao Jixian to death, who was considered a culprit behind the deaths of the workers. On the walls in the photo, portrayed are Ge Shugui, Wu Zhen, unknown, Shi Yang and Li Xiangqian, who died in the strike.
- Date: 4–7 February 1923
- Location: along the Peking–Hankow railway, mainly Changxindian Subdistrict, Zhengzhou and Hankou
- Caused by: At the beginning of the 20th century, Chinese workers were treated poorly and were deeply exploited; The establishment of trade unions was blocked.
- Goals: Remove Zhao Jixian, director of the Railway Bureau, and Feng Jun, chief of the southern section; remove and investigate Huang Dianchen; The Road Bureau compensated the loss of 6,000 yuan for the inaugural meeting; Withdraw the garrison of the Zhengzhou branch trade union, return the plaque to the Federation of Trade Unions and apologize; Set Sunday and one week off during the lunar new year as paid rest days.
- Methods: Strikes, processions, collective agreements, solidarity actions and picketings
- Result: Failed. Wuhan, Changxindian, and Zhengzhou were under martial law. The Beiyang Army and police entered Jiang'an and Changxindian to intervene and disperse the striking workers. Before the National Revolutionary Army's Northern Expedition to liberate Wuhan, the trade unions went underground.

Parties
Chinese Communist Party; Kuomintang Beijing-Hankou Railway Federation of Workers' Unions Workers of Peking-Hankow railway	Zhili clique Peking-Hankow Railway Bureau

Lead figures
Zhang Guotao; Xiang Ying; Chen Tanqiu; Luo Zhanglong; Lin Yunan Lin Xiangqian; Yang Defu; Shi Yang	Wu Peifu; Cao Kun; Xiao Yaonan; Zhang Housheng Zhao Jixian; Feng Yun; Drucker

Casualties and losses
52 dead 200 or more injured	

The Great Strike of February 7th (Note: 二七大罷工, Èr-Qī Dàbàgōng, "Erqi Strike") or Peking-Hankow Railway Workers' Great Strike (Note: 京汉铁路工人大罢工) was a general strike which took place in February 1923.

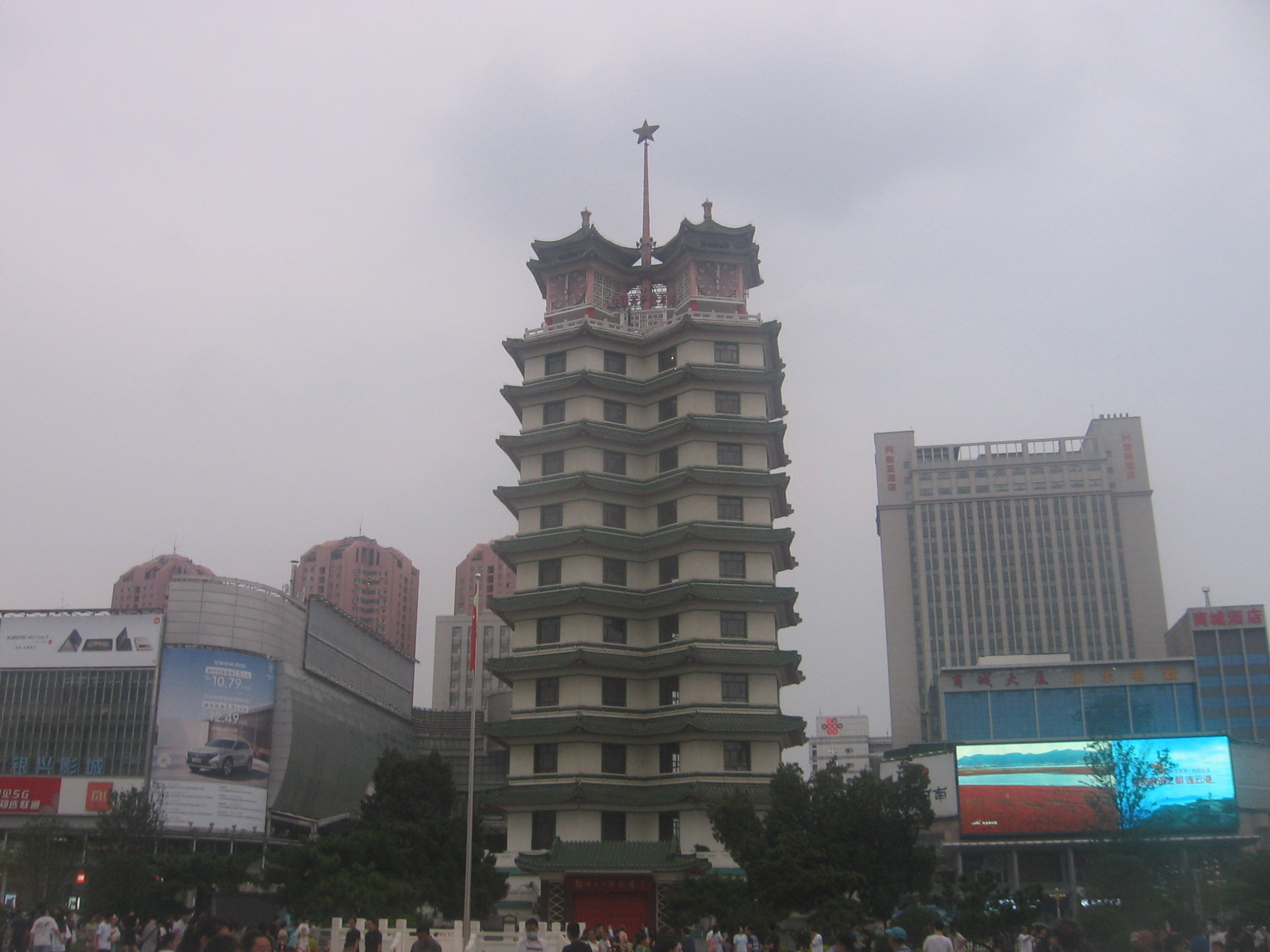
Zhengzhou Memorial Tower for Great Strike of February 7 in Zhengzhou, Henan

At the beginning it was only an internal rally, but under the intervention of Beiyang cliques it eventually developed into a general strike. The situation uncontrollably escalated into bloody clashes in which soldiers and police shot workers, 52 of whom were killed. In the strike also about hundred people injured and thousands of workers were expelled.

The strike has historical significance as it impacted the rise of communism in China.

== Significance ==
On 7 February 1923 a strike of unarmed workers on the Beijing-Hankou Railway was violently cracked down upon on orders of warlord Wu Peifu. Thirty-nine workers died in the violence, which was the first case of mass violence against the young Chinese Communist Party.

The massacre of the striking railway workers in February 1923 caused the CCP leadership to realise that the party could not rely on the strength of the proletariat alone in its struggle against foreign imperialists and domestic warlord forces. The euphoria of the CCP for the growing power of organised labour was deflated by the defeat. It persuaded many of the doubting members that some form of cooperation with the nationalist movement of Sun Yat-sen would be necessary to overthrow the forces oppressing the people of China.

— Tony Saich, Introductory Essay: Background to the 7 February Peking-Hankou Railway Workers' Strike

The communist party gave the killed workers a martyr status, and remembrance of the strike continues to hold strong significance in the party's propaganda. At the location in Zhengzhou where the strike leaders were executed, the Erqi Memorial Tower was erected.

== See also ==
- Beijing–Hankou railway
- Protest and dissent in China
- May Thirtieth Movement
