= Beijing Municipal People's Government =

Local government in China

Beijing Municipal People's Government 北京市人民政府

Leadership
- Mayor: Yin Yong since 28 October 2022
- Executive Deputy Mayor: Xia Linmao
- Deputy Mayors: Qi Yanjun, Jin Wei, Ma Jun, Si Mahong, Mu Peng, Sun Shuo
- Secretary-general: Zeng Jin
- Parent body: Central People's Government; Beijing Municipal People's Congress
- Elected by: Beijing Municipal People's Congress

Meeting place
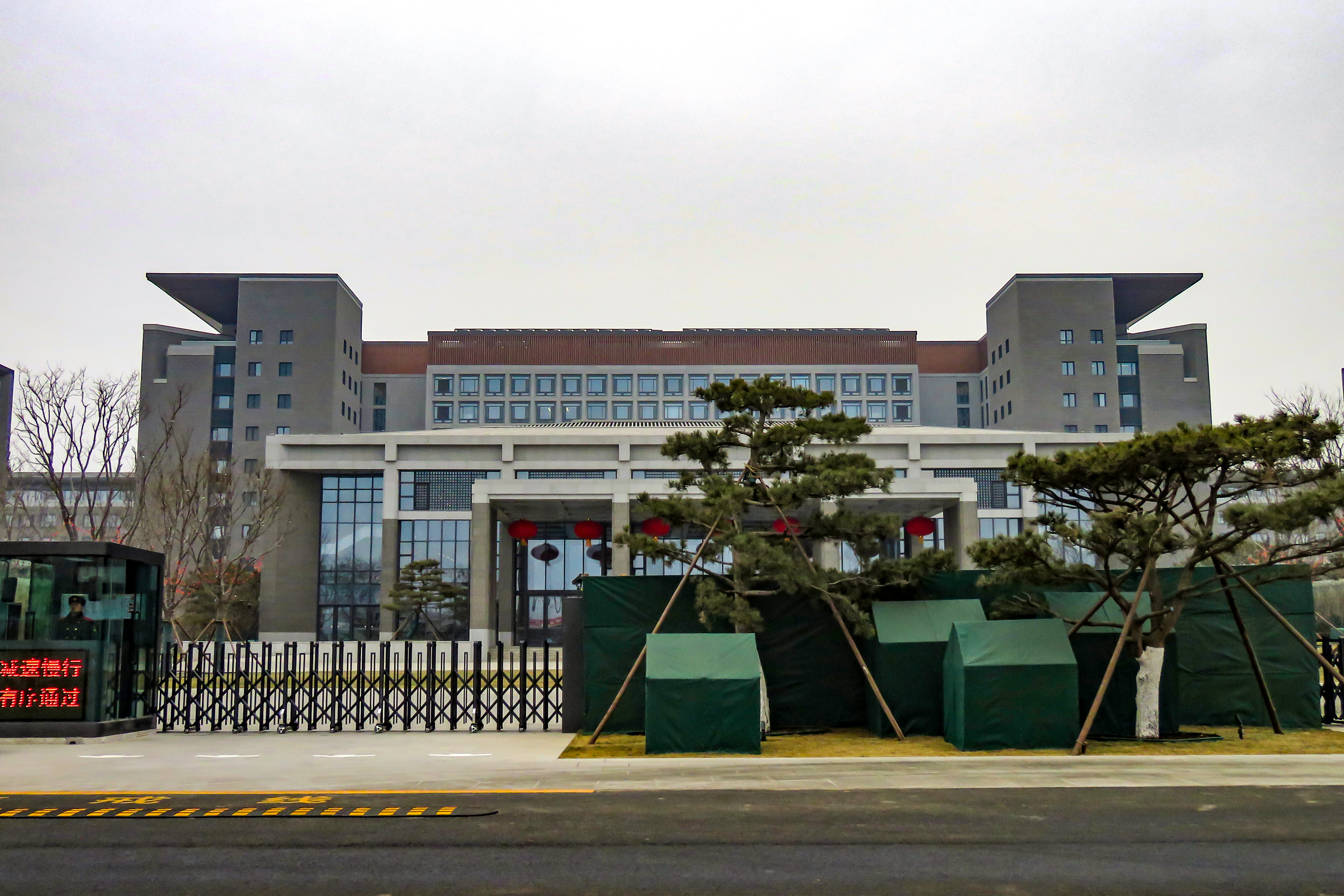
- Headquarters, East Street, Tongzhou, Beijing

Website
- https://www.beijing.gov.cn/

The Beijing Municipal People's Government is the local administrative agency of Beijing. It is officially elected by the Beijing Municipal People's Congress and is formally responsible to the BMPC and its Standing Committee. The municipal government is headed by a mayor, currently Yin Yong. Under the country's one-party system, the mayor is subordinate to the secretary of the Beijing Municipal Committee of the Chinese Communist Party.

== History ==
The Beiping Municipal People's Government was established on 1 January 1949. After Beiping was renamed to Beijing on 27 September, the Municipal People's Government was also renamed. In August 1954, it was renamed to the Beijing Municipal People's Committee. In April 1967, the Beijing Municipal Party Committee, the Municipal Government and the Municipal People's Congress were abolished, and the Beijing Municipal Revolutionary Committee was established, along with the core group of the CCP Beijing Municipal Revolutionary Committee. The Beijing Municipal People's Government was re-established in December 1979.

In 2019, the Municipal Government, along with the Standing Committee of the Municipal People's Congress, the Municipal CCP Committee and the Municipal Committee of the Chinese People's Political Consultative Conference, finished moving its offices to Tongzhou.

== Organization ==
The organization of the Beijing Municipal People's Government includes:

- General Office of the Beijing Municipal People's Government

=== Component Departments ===
- Beijing Municipal Development and Reform Commission
- Beijing Municipal Commission of Education
- Beijing Municipal Science and Technology Commission
- Beijing Municipal Bureau of Economy and Information Technology
- Beijing Municipal Committee of Ethnic and Religious Affairs
- Beijing Municipal Public Security Bureau
- Beijing Municipal Civil Affairs Bureau
- Beijing Municipal Bureau of Justice
- Beijing Municipal Finance Bureau
- Beijing Municipal Bureau of Human Resources and Social Security
- Beijing Municipal Commission of Planning and Natural Resources
- Beijing Municipal Ecology and Environment Bureau
- Beijing Municipal Housing and Urban-Rural Development Commission
- Beijing Municipal Urban Management Committee
- Beijing Municipal Transportation Commission
- Beijing Water Authority
- Beijing Municipal Bureau of Agriculture and Rural Affairs
- Beijing Municipal Bureau of Commerce
- Beijing Municipal Bureau of Culture and Tourism
- Beijing Municipal Health Commission
- Beijing Veterans Affairs Bureau
- Beijing Municipal Emergency Management Bureau
- Beijing Municipal Administration for Market Regulation
- Beijing Municipal Audit Bureau
- Beijing Municipal People's Government Foreign Affairs Office

=== Directly affiliated special institutions ===
- State-owned Assets Supervision and Administration Commission of Beijing Municipal People's Government

=== Organizations under the Municipal Government ===
- Beijing Academy of Science and Technology
- Beijing Academy of Agricultural and Forestry Sciences
- Beijing Institute of Geology and Mineral Exploration
- Beijing Housing Provident Fund Management Center
- Beijing Local Chronicles Compilation Committee Office
- Beijing Municipal Engineering Research Institute (Director Level)
- Beijing Investment Promotion Service Center
- China National Film Museum
- Beijing Municipal Park Administration Center
- Beijing Municipal Hospital Management Center
- National Centre for the Performing Arts
- Beijing Olympic City Development Promotion Center
- Beijing Radio and Television Station
- Beijing International Horticultural Exhibition Coordination Bureau
- Beijing Housing Provident Fund Management Center (Deputy Department Level)
- Beijing Municipal Cultural Market Administrative Law Enforcement Corps
- Beijing Agricultural Products Central Wholesale Market Management Committee

== Leadership ==
Name	Office	Party	Date of birth	Other offices	Ref.
Yin Yong	Mayor Secretary of the Municipal Government Party Leading Group	CCP	August 1969 (age 57)	Deputy Secretary of the Party Beijing Municipal Committee Member of the CCP Central Committee	
Xia Linmao	Executive Deputy Mayor Deputy Secretary of the Party Leading Group	CCP	May 1970 (age 56)	Alternate Member of the CCP Central Committee	
Qi Yanjun	Deputy Mayor Member of the Party Leading Group	CCP	October 1964 (age 62)	Director of the Beijing Municipal Public Security Bureau Vice Minister of Public Security	
Jin Wei	Deputy Mayor Member of the Party Leading Group	CCP	May 1972 (age 54)	Director of the Financial Office Secretary of the FInancial Work Commission President of the Beijing Red Cross Society	
Tan Xuxiang	Deputy Mayor Member of the Party Leading Group	CCP	May 1966 (age 60)	Secretary of the Party Working Committee of the Urban Sub-Center Director of the Management Committee	
Ma Jun	Deputy Mayor Member of the Party Leading Group	CCP	April 1969 (age 57)	Chairman of the Beijing Disabled Persons’ Federation	
Sima Hong	Deputy Mayor	CNDCA	January 1969 (age 57)	Vice Chairperson of the CNDCA Chairperson of the Beijing Municipal Committee of the CNDCA	
Mu Peng	Deputy Mayor Member of the Party Leading Group	CCP	May 1966 (age 60)		
Sun Shuo	Deputy Mayor Member of the Party Leading Group	CCP	November 1974 (age 51–52)	Secretary of the Xicheng District Committee	
Zeng Jin	Secretary-General Member of the Party Leading Group	CCP	February 1970 (age 56)	Secretary-general of the Party Beijing Municipal Committee Director of the Municipal Government Office Director of the Municipal State-owned Assets Supervision and Administration Commission	

== See also ==
- Beijing E-Town
