= Li Shixiang =

Chinese politician

- 李士祥

Vice Chairman of the Beijing Municipal Committee of the Chinese People's Political Consultative Conference
- In office January 2017 – January 2018
- Chairman: Ji Lin

Executive Vice Mayor of Beijing
- In office July 2012 – February 2017
- Preceded by: Ji Lin
- Succeeded by: Zhang Gong

Secretary-General of Beijing Municipal Committee of the Chinese Communist Party
- In office December 2006 – July 2012
- Preceded by: Sun Zhengcai
- Succeeded by: Zhao Fengtong

Communist Party Secretary of Chaoyang District
- In office January 2003 – November 2006
- Preceded by: Liu Xiaochen
- Succeeded by: Chen Gang

Head of Chaoyang District
- In office November 1999 – January 2003
- Preceded by: Li Fengling
- Succeeded by: Chen Gang

Personal details
- Born: August 1958 (age 68) Beijing
- Party: Chinese Communist Party (expelled; 1982-2019)
- Education: Central Party School of the Chinese Communist Party

Li Shixiang (Chinese: 李士祥; pinyin: Lǐ Shìxiáng; born August 1958) is a former Chinese politician who spent his entire career in Beijing. He served as Executive Vice Mayor of Beijing and Vice Chairman of the Beijing Municipal Committee of the Chinese People's Political Consultative Conference (CPPCC). He entered the workforce in August 1978, and joined the Chinese Communist Party (CCP) in March 1982. In September 2018, he was placed under investigation by the Central Commission for Discipline Inspection (CCDI), the Communist Party's internal disciplinary body, and the National Supervisory Commission, the highest anti-corruption agency of China.

Li was an alternate member of the 18th CCP Central Committee and a delegate to the 12th National People's Congress.

== Career ==
Li was born in August 1958 in Beijing. He began his career in August 1978 as a middle school teacher in the city's Tongzhou district.

In January 2003 he was promoted to become party chief of Chaoyang District, one of the most prosperous regions in the capital city, in which he held until November 2006. Three years later, he was admitted to a member of the standing committee of the Beijing Party committee, the city's top authority. In July 2012 he was promoted again to become executive vice mayor of Beijing. Then he was appointed as vice-chairman of the Beijing Municipal Committee of the Chinese People's Political Consultative Conference (CPPCC), serving in the post until he retirement in January 2018.

== Downfall ==
In September 2018, he was put under investigation for alleged "serious violations of discipline and laws", said one-sentence statement issued by the ruling Communist Party's corruption watchdog body, the Central Commission for Discipline Inspection (CCDI). In February 2019, Li was expelled from the CCP over serious violations of Party discipline and laws including taking bribes.

On June 27, 2019, his trial was held at the Changchun Intermediate People's Court. The public prosecutors accused him of abusing his positions between 2001 and 2013 in various positions in Beijing, including as party chief of Chaoyang district and vice-mayor of the capital, to help relevant departments and individuals in land acquisition, construction projects, house demolition and job promotions, and also colluded with other government employees to help others in financing. Other offenses included failing to report personal matters to authorities and engaging in superstitious activities in his pursuit of a successful career.

On November 12, 2019, Li was sentenced to 10 years in prison and fine of 6 million yuan ($928,800) for taking bribes of 88.19 million yuan ($13.65 million) by the Changchun Intermediate People's Court in Jilin province.

Government offices
Preceded by Yu Changhai	Magistrate of Changgu County; 1993–1999	Succeeded by Zhao Fengtong
Preceded by Li Fengling	Head of Chaoyang District; 1999–2003	Succeeded by Chen Gang
Preceded by Ji Lin	Executive Vice Mayor of Beijing; 2012–2017	Succeeded by Zhang Gong
Party political offices
Preceded by Liu Xiaochen	Communist Party Secretary of Chaoyang District; 2003–2006	Succeeded by Chen Gang
Preceded by Sun Zhengcai	Secretary-General of Beijing Municipal Committee of the Chinese Communist Party; 2006–2012	Succeeded by Zhao Fengtong
