= Yin Yong (politician) =

Chinese banker and politician

- 殷勇
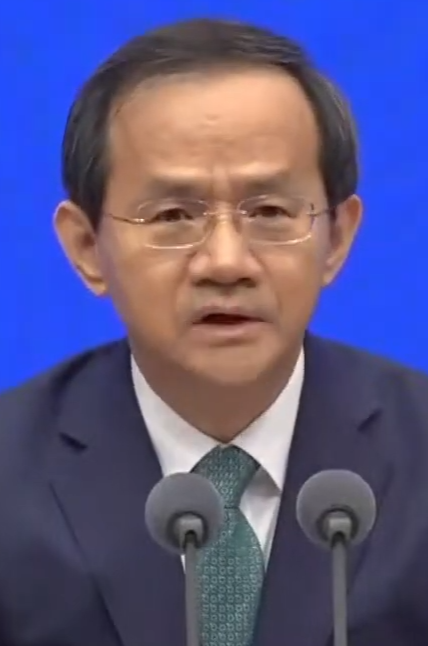
- Yin in 2024

Mayor of Beijing
- Incumbent
- Assumed office 28 October 2022 (Acting until 19 January 2023)
- Party Secretary: Cai Qi; Yin Li
- Preceded by: Chen Jining

Personal details
- Born: August 1969 (age 57) Caidian, Wuhan, Hubei, China
- Party: Chinese Communist Party
- Education: Harvard Kennedy School

Yin Yong (Chinese: 殷勇; pinyin: Yīn Yǒng; born August 1969) is a Chinese banker and politician who is the mayor of Beijing, in office since 28 October 2022. Previously, he served as deputy party secretary of Beijing, vice mayor of Beijing, and vice governor of People's Bank of China.

== Early life and education ==
Yin was born in Caidian District of Wuhan, Hubei, in August 1969. In 1987, he entered the Department of Automation, Tsinghua University, and earned his doctor's degree in economic management under the supervision of Zheng Weimin. He also holds a Master of Public Administration from Harvard University.

== Political career ==
Yin joined the Chinese Communist Party (CCP) in May 1994, and began his political career in January 1997, when he was despatched to the Reserve Management Department of the State Administration of Foreign Exchange. He also served as general manager of China Investment Corporation (Singapore) between 2001 and 2002.

On 19 August 2015, Yin was named assistant governor of the People's Bank of China, and was elevated to vice governor on 27 December 2016, becoming the youngest vice governor and governor in the history of the People's Bank of China.

=== Beijing ===
On 19 January 2018, Yin was appointed vice mayor of Beijing, and ten months later was admitted to member of the Standing Committee of the CCP Beijing Municipal Committee, the capital city's top authority. In June 2022, he was made deputy party secretary of Beijing, in addition to serving as acting mayor since 28 October. On 19 January 2023, he was formally elected as the mayor by the Beijing Municipal People's Congress.

He is a representative of the 20th National Congress of the Chinese Communist Party and a member of the 20th Central Committee of the Chinese Communist Party.

Party political offices
Preceded by Zhang Yankun	Deputy Communist Party Secretary of Beijing; 2022	Succeeded by Liu Wei
Government offices
Preceded by Chen Jining	Mayor of Beijing; 2022–	Incumbent
