= Erqi Memorial Tower =

Building in Zhengzhou, Henan, China

- 二七纪念塔
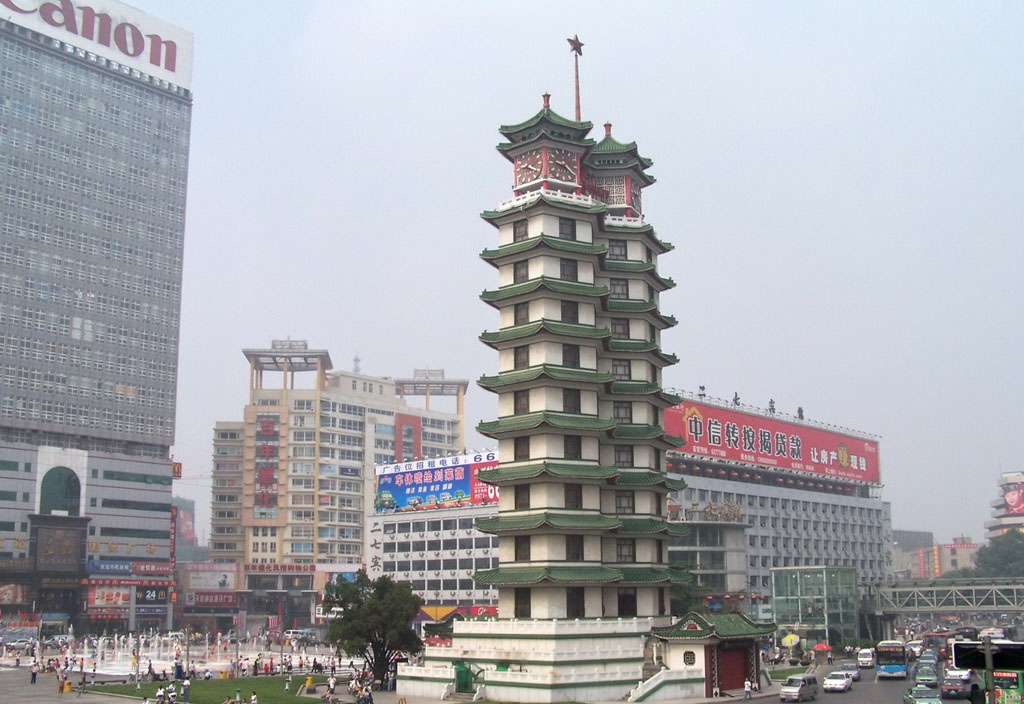
- Alternative names: Erqi Tower

General information
- Architectural style: Chinese architectural style
- Location: Zhengzhou, China
- Coordinates: 34.753°N 113.66°E
- Completed: September 29, 1971

Height
- Height: 63 meters

Technical details
- Floor count: 14

The Erqi Memorial Tower, or Erqi Tower (Chinese: 二七纪念塔; pinyin: Èrqī Jìniàntǎ) is located in Erqi District, in the centre of Zhengzhou city, Henan province, China. The tower is 63 meters high and has 14 floors. It was historically the tallest building in Zhengzhou until 1976.

== History ==
The tower serves as a memorial to the Great Strike of February 7, which occurred on February 7, 1923. The tower is built at the location where the strike leaders were executed. The current Erqi Memorial Tower was completed on September 29, 1971. It was preceded by a wooden tower built in 1951, which had collapsed in 1971.

In May 2020, it was announced that the square surrounding the tower would be enlarged to 21,000 square metres (5.2 acres), and that an adjacent building, the Friendship Mansion (Chinese: 友谊大厦; pinyin: Yǒuyì Dàshà), a 20 story building, would be downgraded to 6 stories in height. This plan will be carried out to better highlight the tower.

== Description ==
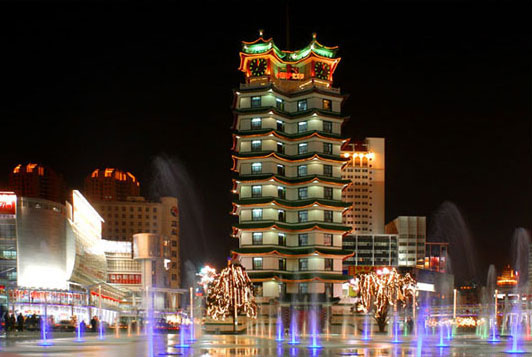
Erqi Memorial Tower at night

The tower stands in Erqi Square. It is made from reinforced concrete, and is done in a Chinese architectural style. The tower's shape, two pentagonal conjoined towers, is meant to commemorate the striking workers of the Erqi Strike, who went on strike while building the Beijing–Hankou railway. At the top of the tower is a five-pointed red star and a 2.7 meter clock below. The clock plays the Chinese revolutionary song The East Is Red every hour. The tower displays various historical relics, pictures, and written materials about the strike.
