= Erqi, Zhengzhou =

Erqi 二七区
- District
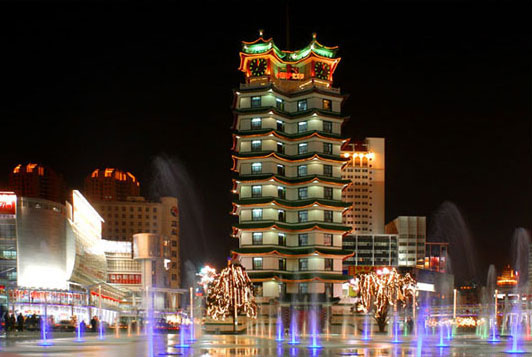
- Erqi Memorial Tower

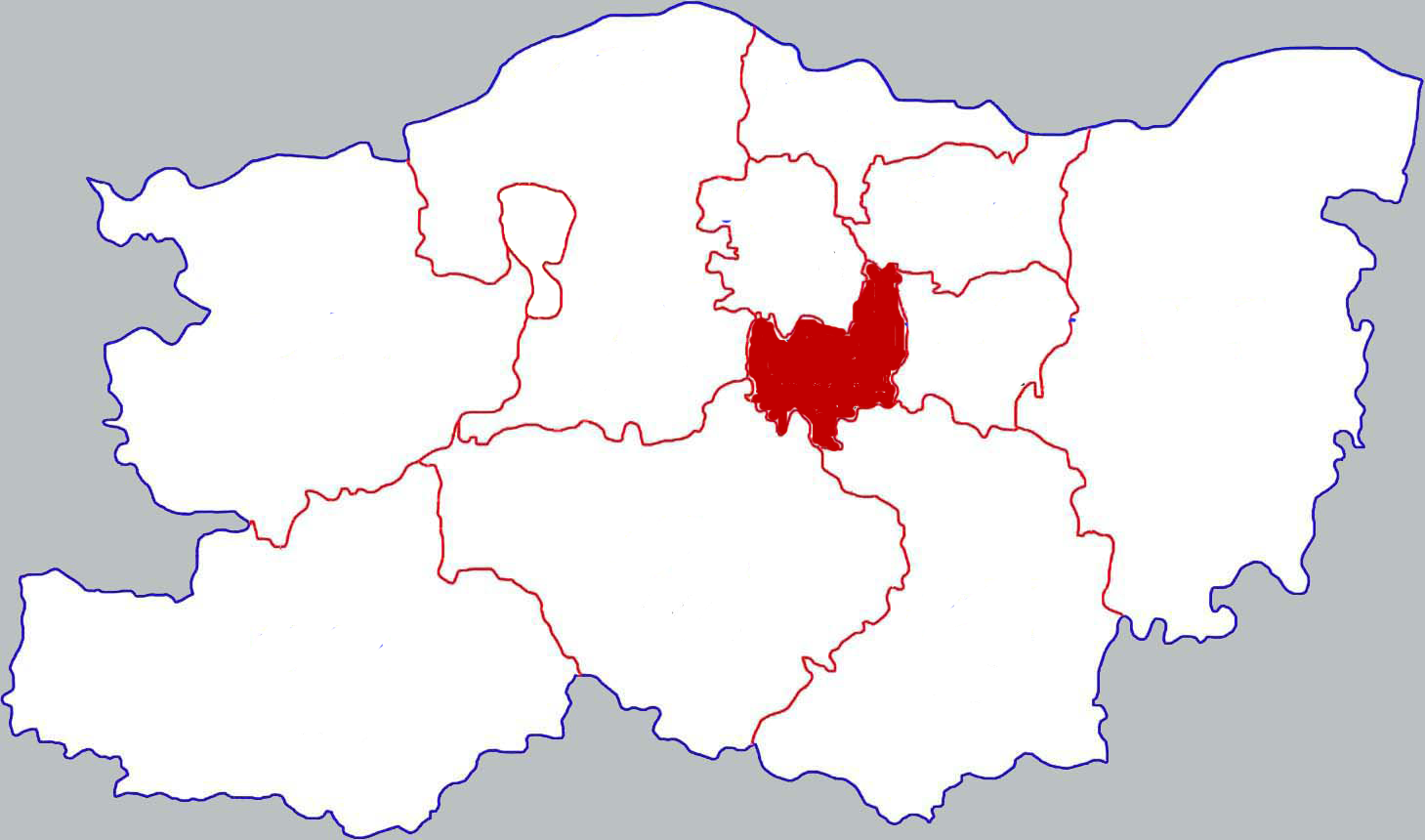
- Location in Zhengzhou

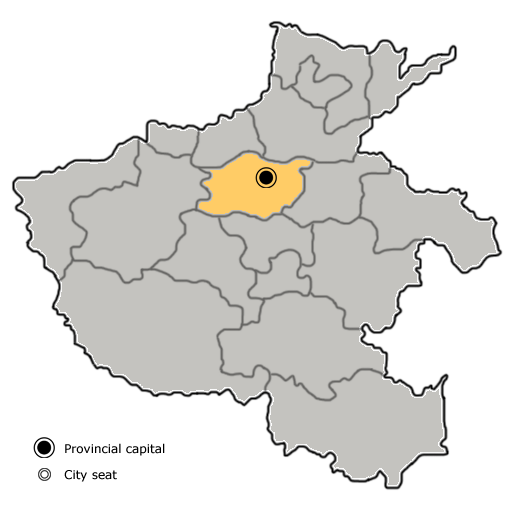
- Zhengzhou in Henan
- Coordinates: 34°45′37″N 113°38′31″E
- Country: People's Republic of China
- Province: Henan
- Prefecture-level city: Zhengzhou

Area
  - Total: 159 km^{2} (61 sq mi)

Population (2019)
  - Total: 838,100
  - Density: 5,270/km^{2} (13,700/sq mi)
- Time zone: UTC+8 (China Standard)
- Postal code: 450052
- Area code: 0371
- Website: www.erqi.gov.cn

Erqi District (Chinese: 二七区; pinyin: Èrqī Qū) is one of six urban districts of the prefecture-level city of Zhengzhou, the capital of Henan Province, South Central China.

== Administrative divisions ==
As of 2012, this district is divided to 6 subdistricts, 1 town and 1 township.

Subdistricts

- Huaihelu Subdistrict (淮河路街道)
- Jiefanglu Subdistrict (解放路街道)
- Minggonglu Subdistrict (铭功路街道)
- Yimalu Subdistrict (一马路街道)
- Mifengzhang Subdistrict (蜜蜂张街道)
- Wulibao Subdistrict (五里堡街道)
- Daxuelu Subdistrict (大学路街道)
- Jianzhongjie Subdistrict (建中街街道)
- Fuhuajie Subdistrict (福华街街道)
- Dehuajie Subdistrict (德化街街道)
- Songshanlu Subdistrict (嵩山路街道)
- Changjianglu Subdistrict (长江路街道)
- Jingguanglu Subdistrict (京广路街道)

Towns

- Mazhai (马寨镇)

Townships

- Houzhai Township (侯寨乡)

== Tourist attractions ==
- Erqi Memorial Tower
- Xiaolou Mosque
