= Deng Tuo =

Chinese writer and intellectual

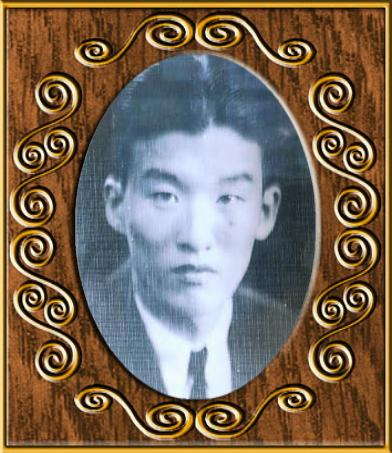
The portrait of Deng Toe (1911 - 1966)

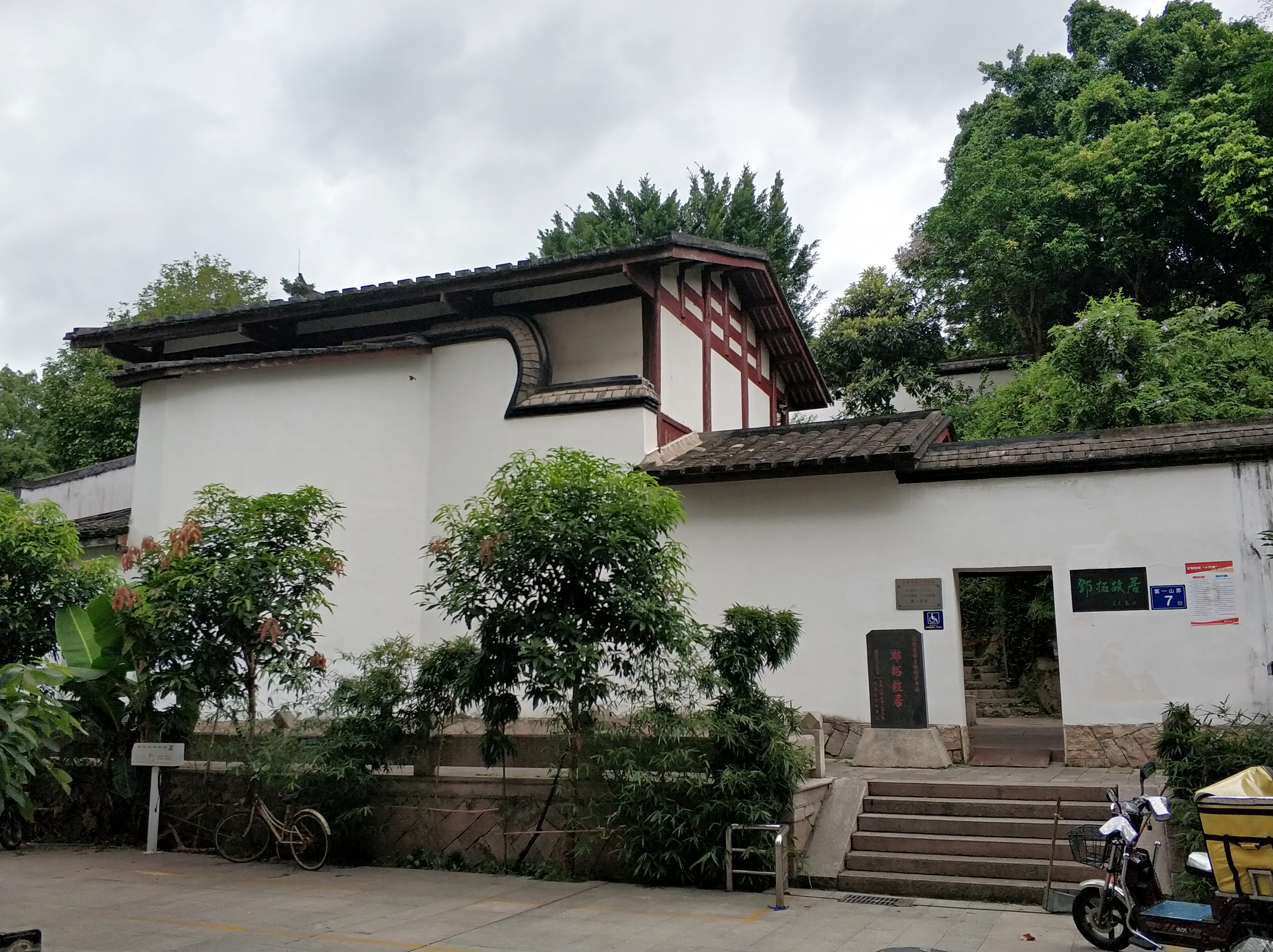
Former residence of Deng Tuo in Fuzhou

Deng Tuo (Chinese: 邓拓; pinyin: Dènɡ Tuò; c. 1911 – 17 May 1966), also known by the pen name Ma Nancun (Chinese: 马南邨; pinyin: Mǎ Náncūn), was a Chinese poet, intellectual and journalist. He became a cadre of the Chinese Communist Party and served as editor-in-chief of the People's Daily from 1948 to 1958. He committed suicide in 1966 following scathing criticism in the People's Daily, as the Cultural Revolution was beginning.

== Bibliography ==
- Timothy Cheek, Propaganda and Culture in Mao's China: Deng Tuo and the Intelligentsia, Oxford University Press, 1998 ISBN 978-0-19-829066-7
- Roderick MacFarquhar: The origins of the cultural revolution, Oxford University Press ISBN 0-19-214997-0
