= Beijing Municipal Committee of the Chinese Communist Party =

Local committee of the Chinese Communist Party in Beijing

Beijing Municipal Committee of the Chinese Communist Party 中国共产党北京市委员会

Overview
- Type: Highest decision-making organ when Beijing Municipal Congress is not in session.
- Elected by: Beijing Municipal Congress
- Length of term: Five years
- Term limits: None
- First convocation: August 1921
- Secretary: Yin Li
- Deputy Secretary: Yin Yong (Mayor)
- Executive organ: Standing Committee
- Inspection organ: Commission for Discipline Inspection

Meeting place
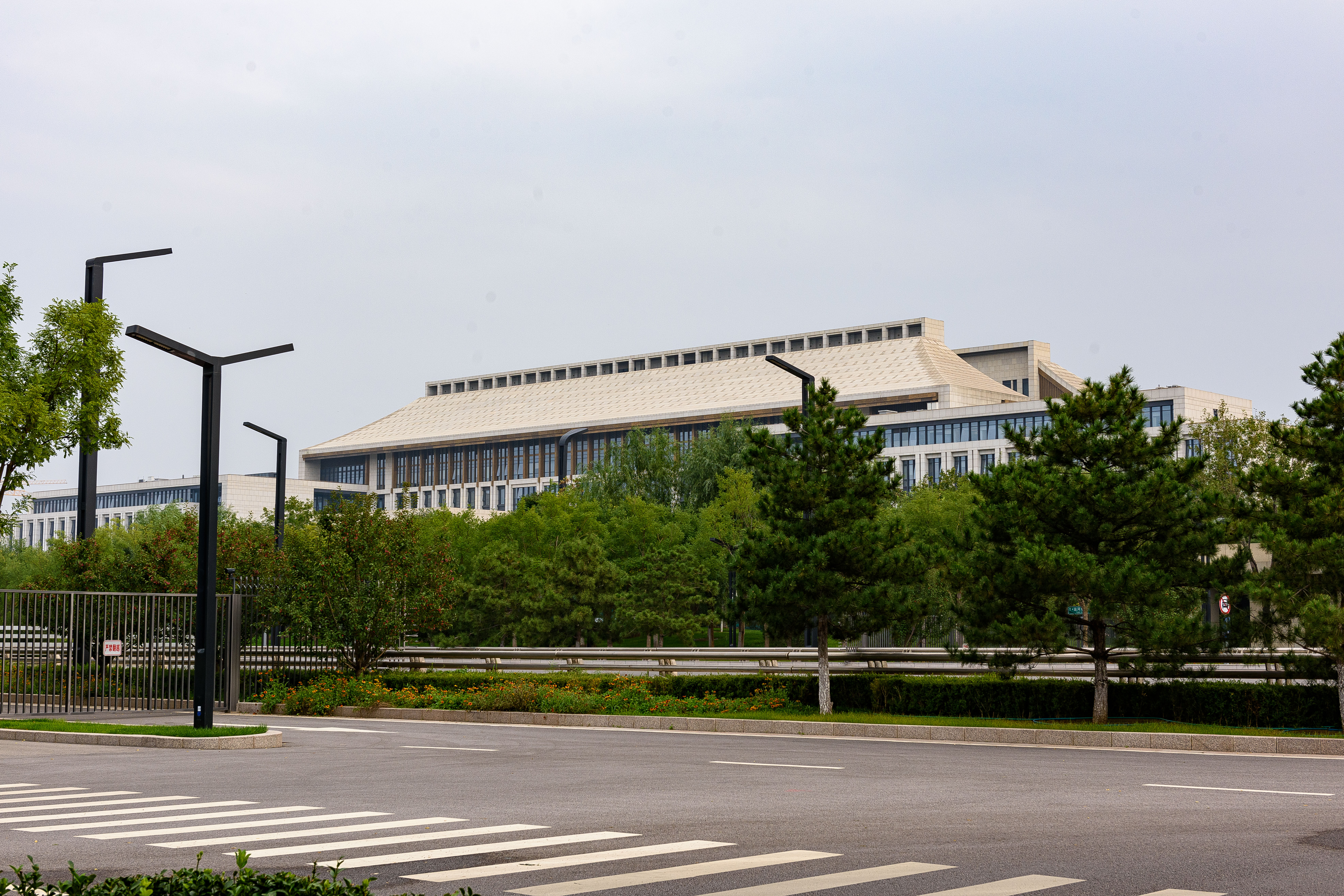
- Beijing Municipal Committee Building

Beijing Municipal Committee of the Chinese Communist Party
- Simplified Chinese: 中国共产党北京市委员会
- Traditional Chinese: 中國共產黨北京市委員會
Transcriptions
Standard Mandarin
- Hanyu Pinyin: Zhōngguó Gòngchǎndǎng Běijīngshì Wěiyuánhuì

Abbreviation
- Chinese: 中共北京市委
- Literal meaning: CCP Beijing Municipal Committee
Transcriptions
Standard Mandarin
- Hanyu Pinyin: Zhōnggòng Běijīngshì Wěi

The Beijing Municipal Committee of the Chinese Communist Party, officially the Beijing Municipal Committee of the Communist Party of China, is the municipal committee of the Chinese Communist Party (CCP) in Beijing. The CCP committee secretary is the highest ranking post in the city. The current secretary is Yin Li, a member of the CCP Politburo, who succeeded Cai Qi on 13 November 2022.

== History ==
In August 1921, the CCP set up the CCP Beijing Local Committee (中共北京地方委员会); in July 1922, it was renamed as the CCP Beijing Local Executive Committee (中共北京地方执行委员会); in July 1923, it was reorganized as the CCP Beijing District Executive Committee and Beijing Local Executive Committee (中共北京区执行委员会兼北京地方执行委员会); in October 1925, it was changed to the CCP Northern District Executive Committee (中共北方区执行委员会).

In April 1927, the organs of the Northern District Executive Committee were sabotaged by Zhang Zuolin's military and police, and leaders of the Northern District Executive Committee such as Li Dazhao, Fan Hongjie, and Yang Jingshan were arrested together with some Kuomintang members and later hanged. In May, the 5th National Congress of the Chinese Communist Party was convened, and the establishment of the District Executive Committee was withdrawn, and CCP provincial committees were set up in various places. In July of the same year, the CCP Beijing Committee was established.

In June 1928, the city of Beijing was renamed Beiping, and the CCP Beiping Committee was reorganized. After the July 7 Incident, the invading Japanese army took control of Beiping, and the CCP Beiping Committee was reorganized, with Huang Jing as the secretary and Li Changqing, Liu Jie, Liu Shenzhi, and Ge Chen as its members. In 1938, Wang Dingnan became the secretary of the Beiping Special Committee, and the local organization of the CCP in Beiping was destroyed and had to be withdrawn after the arrest of Wang by the Japanese Special Higher Police and the Kempeitai in June 1942. Onwards, there were no CCP organizations in the city of Beiping.

In September 1944, the Urban Work Department of CCP Jin-Cha-Ji Central Bureau (中共晋察冀中央分局) directly led the Party work in Beiping, with Liu Ren and Liu Shenzhi in charge of the daily work. In September 1945, after the Japanese surrendered, the CCP re-established the CCP Beiping City Committee. Liu Ren was the secretary, Wu Guang was the deputy secretary and organization minister, Zhou Xiaozhou was the publicity minister, and Gan Chunlei was the military minister.

At the end of 1948, during the Pingjin Campaign, the CCP began preparations to take over the city of Beiping. The CCP Central Committee and the CCP North China Central Bureau (中共中央华北局) decided to form the Party, political and military leadership in Beiping. On December 13, the Central Military Commission appointed Nie Rongzhen as the garrison commander of Pingjin District and Bo Yibo as a political commissar. The CCP Central Committee appointed Peng Zhen as the secretary of the CCP Beiping Municipal Committee and Ye Jianying as the first deputy secretary of the CCP Beiping Municipal Committee, with Ye Jianying concurrently serving as the director of the Beiping Military Management Committee (PMC) and the mayor of Beiping. On December 17, the CCP Beiping Municipal Committee convened its first meeting in Baoding, discussing the organizational structure of the PMC, its nominees, a number of specific tasks, and discipline of the staff who entered the city. That night, the Beiping Municipal Committee personnel departed from Baoding and arrived at Zhuo County in the early hours of December 18. On December 24, Ye Jianying made a report announcing that the takeover of the suburbs of Beiping had begun and preparations were being made for the later takeover of the urban areas of Beiping.

In late January 1949, the CCP took control of Beiping, and on September 27, the city was renamed Beijing Municipality, from which the Beiping Municipal Committee was renamed as Beijing Municipal Committee. In April 1967, the Beijing Municipal Party Committee, the Municipal Government and the Municipal People's Congress were abolished, and the Beijing Municipal Revolutionary Committee was established, along with the core group of the CCP Beijing Municipal Revolutionary Committee.

In March 1971, the CCP Beijing Municipal Committee was re-established, and in August 1984, the Beijing Municipal Committee ceased to have a First Secretary and was replaced by a Secretary and Deputy Secretary.

In 2015, government officials finalized plans to move the offices of several political organizations, including the Municipal Committee, from the city's downtown to the Tongzhou District. In 2019, the Municipal Committee, along with the Standing Committee of the Municipal People's Congress, the Municipal People's Government and the Municipal Committee of the Chinese People's Political Consultative Conference, finished moving its offices to Tongzhou.

== Organization ==
The organization of the Beijing Municipal Committee includes:

- General Office

=== Functional Departments ===
- Organization Department
- Publicity Department
- United Front Work Department
- Political and Legal Affairs Commission

=== Offices ===
- Office of the Cyberspace Affairs Commission
- Office of the Institutional Organization Commission
- Office of the Leading Group for Inspection Work
- Office of the National Security Commission
- Office of the Military-civilian Fusion Development Committee
- Letters and Calls Bureau
- Taiwan Work Office
- Bureau of Veteran Cadres

=== Dispatched institutions ===
- Working Committee of the Organs Directly Affiliated to the Beijing Municipal Committee
- Rural Working Committee
- Education Working Committee

=== Organizations directly under the Committee ===
- Beijing Administration Institute
- Beijing Daily
- Beijing Institute of Socialism
- Party History Research Office
- Municipal Archives Bureau
- Beijing People's Art Theatre
- Frontline

== Leadership ==
The secretary of the committee is the highest office in Beijing, being superior to the mayor of the city. Since at least 2007, the secretary has consistently been a member of the CCP Politburo.

=== Party Committees ===
Initial period (December 1948-June 1955)

- Secretary: Peng Zhen
- Second Secretary: Liu Ren (January–June 1955)
- First Deputy Secretary: Ye Jianying (December 1948-August 1949)
- Second Deputy Secretary: Li Baohua (December 1948-August 1951)
- Deputy Secretary: Liu Ren (March 1951 - January 1955), Chen Peng (March - June 1955)

1st Municipal Committee (June 1955-August 1956)

- First Secretary: Peng Zhen
- Second Secretary: Liu Ren
- Secretaries of the Secretariat: Zhang Youyu, Zheng Tianxiang, Chen Peng, Fan Rusheng

2nd Municipal Committee (August 1956-May 1962)

- First Secretary: Peng Zhen
- Second Secretary: Liu Ren
- Secretary of the Secretariat: Zhang Youyu (-December 1958), Zheng Tianxiang, Chen Peng, Fan Rusheng, Wan Li (March 1958-), Deng Tuo (September 1958-), Chen Kexhan (September 1958-)

3rd Municipal Committee (May 1962 - May 1966)

- First Secretary: Peng Zhen
- Second Secretary: Liu Ren
- Secretaries of the Secretariat: Zheng Tianxiang, Wan Li, Chen Peng (-June 1963), Deng Tuo, Chen Kehan, Feng Jiping (-July 1964), Zhao Fan (October 1964-), Jia Tingsan (October 1964)

3rd Municipal Committee (May 1966-April 1967)

- First Secretary: Li Xuefeng
- Second Secretary: Wu De
- Secretaries of the Secretariat: Wan Wan (June–October 1966), Chen Kexhan (June–October 1966), Zhao Fan (June–July 1966), Gao Yangwen, Guo Yingqiu, Ma Li, Liu Hegeng (appointed in August 1966, not yet in office), Wang Yiping (appointed in August 1966, not yet in office), Chi Bi-Qing (August 1966-), Liu Jianxun (September 1966-), Yong Wentao (September 1966-), Ding Guoyu (October 1966-)

4th Municipal Committee (March 1971-October 1976)

- First Secretary: Xie Fuzhi (-March 1972), Wu De (October 1972-March 1974)
- Second Secretary: Wu De (- October 1972)
- Second Secretary: Yang Junsheng, Wu Zhong, Huang Zuo-zhen, Liu Shaowen, Ding Guoyu, Ni Zhifu (May 1973 -), Xie Jingyi (May 1973 -), Wan Li (May 1973 -January 1975), Li Ne (appointed May 1973, did not serve)

4th Municipal Committee (October 1976-November 1982)

- First Secretary: Wu De (-October 1978), Lin Huijia (October 1978-January 1981), Duan Junyi (January 1981-)
- Second Secretary: Ni Zhifu (July 1977-February 1980), Jiao Ruoyu (January 1981-)
- Third Secretary: Ding Guoyu (July 1977-May 1978), Jia Tingsan (May 1978-)
- Secretaries: Yang Junsheng (-November 1979), Wu Zhong (-September 1977), Huang Zuochen (-December 1978), Liu Shaowen (-November 1979), Ding Guoyu (-July 1977), Ding Guoyu (-July 1977), Ding Guoyu (-July 1978), Ding Guoyu (-July 1978) July 1977), Ni Zhifu (- July 1977), Yang Shoushan (July 1977 - May 1978), Wang Lei (July–December 1977, May 1978 -March 1979), Zheng Tianxiang (July 1977-May 1978), Ye Lin (May 1978-), Zhao Pengfei (May 1978-), Mao Lianjue (May 1978 -August 1980), Li Ligong (May 1978-May 1981), Wang Xian (May 1978-), Wang Chun (March 1979), Chen Peng (March 1979 -), Liu Guisheng (March 1981), Feng Kiping (April 1981), Chen Xitong (July 1981-)

5th Municipal Committee (October 1982-August 1984)

- First Secretary: Duan Junyi (-May 1984)
- Secretary: Jiao Ruoyu (-March 1983), Chen Xitong, Zhao Pengfei

5th Municipal Committee (August 1984-December 1987)

- Secretary: Li Ximing
- Deputy Secretary: Jia Chunwang (-December 1985), Chen Xitong, Jin Jian, Xu Weicheng, Wang Daming (March 1987-)

5th Municipal Committee (December 1987-December 1992）

- Secretary: Li Ximing
- Deputy Secretaries: Chen Xitong, Xu Weicheng (-October 1989), Li Qiyan, Wang Jiaming (September 1988-), Wang Guang (October 1989-)

Sixth Municipal Committee (December 1987-December 1992)

- Secretary: Li Ximing
- Deputy Secretaries: Chen Xitong, Xu Weicheng (-October 1989), Li Qiyan, Wang Jiaming (September 1988-), Wang Guang (October 1989-)

Seventh Municipal Committee (December 1992 - December 1997)

- Secretary: ~~Chen Xitong~~ (-removed in April 1996) Wei Jianxing (acting since April 1996)
- Deputy Secretaries: Li Qiyan (-October 1997), Jia Qinglin (October 1997-), Li Zhijian, Chen Guangwen

Eighth Municipal Committee (December 1997-May 2002)

- Secretaries: Wei Jianxing (-August 1998), Jia Qinglin (August 1998-)
- Deputy Secretaries: Liu Qi (March 1999-), Jia Qinglin (-August 1998), Zhang Fusen (August 1998-), Li Zhijian, Yu Junbo, Jin Renqing (-March 1999), Long Xinmin (August 2000-), Qiang Wei (March 2001-)

Ninth Municipal Party Committee (May 2002 - May 2007)

- Secretary: Jia Qinglin (-November 2002), Liu Qi (November 2002-)
- Deputy Secretaries: Liu Qi (-November 2002), Yu Junbo, Long Xinmin (-December 2005), Qiang Wei (-March 2007), Du Deyin, Yang Anjiang (-January 2006), Wang Qishan (April 2003-), Wang Anshun (March 2007-)

10th Municipal Committee (May 2007-June 2012)

- Secretary: Liu Qi
- Deputy Secretary: Wang Qishan (- November 2007), Wang Anshun, Guo Jinlong (November 2007)
- Standing Committee Members: Liu Qi, Wang Qishan (- November 2007), Guo Jinlong (November 2007), Wang Anshun, Ma Zhipeng, Zhu Shanlu (- February 2009), Cai Fuchao, You Lantian (- November 2009), Jilin, Ma Zhenchuan, Lv Xiwen, Li Shixiang, Li Shaojun, Liang Wei, Niu Youcheng (- April 2009), Zhao Fengtong (- December 2009), Fu Zhenghua (- November 2009), Fu Zhenghua (July 2010 - )
- Secretary-General: Li Shixiang

11th Municipal Committee (July 2012-June 2017)

- Secretary: Guo Jinlong (-May 2017), Cai Qi (May 2017-)
- Deputy Secretary: Wang Anshun (-October 2016), Jilin (-April 2013), Lv Xiwen (April 2013-November 2015), Gou Zhongwen (May 2016-October), Cai Qi (October 2016-May 2017), Jing Junhai (April 2017-), Chen Jining (May 2017-)
- Executive members: Guo Jinlong (- May 2017), Wang Anshun (- October 2016), Jilin (- April 2013), Ye Qingchun (- December 2015), Lv Xiwen (-November 2015), Li Shixiang (-February 2017), Niu Youcheng (-April 2015), Zhao Fengtong (-July 2014), Lu Wei (- April 2013), Zheng Chuanfu (- December 2013), Fu Zhenghua (- March 2015), Chen Gang (May 1966) (- February 2017), Chen Gang (1965) (- July 2013), Li Wei (May 2013 - January 2017), Jiang Zhigang (May 2013 - April 2017), Gou Zhongwen ( June 2013 - October 2016), Zhang Gong (April 2015-), Pan Liangshi (February 2015 - March 2017), Dai Junliang (May 2013 -June 2016), Zhang Yankun (May 2013-), Li Shulei (December 2015-January 2017), Cai Qi (October 2016-), Lin Keqing (December 2016-), Zhang Shuo Fu (January 2017-), Yin Hejun (March 2017-), Jing Junhai (April 2017-), Du Feijin (April 2017 -), Wei Xiaodong (April 2017-), Chen Jining (May 2017-)
- Secretary-General: Zhao Fengtong (July 2012-July 2014), Zhang Gong (April 2015-)

12th Municipal Party Committee (June 2017–June 2022)

- Secretary: Cai Qi
- Deputy Secretaries: Chen Jining, Jing Junhai (until January 2018), Zhang Yankun (from November 2020)
- Other Standing Committee members: Zhang Gong (until October 2018), Yin Hejun (until October 2018), Zhang Shuofu (until July 2018), Lin Keqing (until December 2019), Du Feijin (until December 2021), Wei Xiaodong (until August 2021), Cui Shuqiang, Qi Jing, Jiang Yong (January 2018–January 2020), Chen Yong (October 2018–July 2021), Wang Ning (December 2018–February 2021), Yin Yong (from December 2018), Wang Chunning (January 2020–May 2020), Zhang Fandi (from May 2020), Zhang Jianming (from September 2020), Sun Meijin (from December 2020), Xia Linmao (from February 2021), Mo Gaoyi (from March 2021), You Jun (from October 2021), Chen Jian (from November 2021)
- Secretary-General: Cui Shuqiang (until September 2020), Zhang Jianming (from September 2020)

13th Municipal Party Committee (June 2022–)

- Secretary: Cai Qi (until November 2022), Yin Li (from November 2022)
- Deputy Secretaries: Chen Jining (until October 2022), Yin Yong, Liu Wei (from December 2022)
- Other Standing Committee members: You Jun, Sun Meijun (until November 2023), Chen Jian, Mo Gaoyi, Xia Linmao, Fu Wenhua, Yang Jinbai, Jin Wei, Sun Junmin, Zhao Lei, Yu Yingjie (from December 2023)

== See also ==
- Politics of Beijing
