= 8th Politburo of the Chinese Communist Party =

8th electoral term of the Political Bureau of the Chinese Communist Party

The 8th Politburo of the Chinese Communist Party (CCP), formally the Political Bureau of the 8th Central Committee of the Communist Party of China, was elected at the 1st plenary session of the 8th Central Committee of the CCP on 28 September 1956 in the aftermath of the 8th National Congress. This electoral term was preceded by the 7th Politburo and succeeded by the 9th. 11 of the 26 members served concurrently in the 8th Politburo Standing Committee.

== Composition ==
=== Members ===
Members of the Political Bureau of the 8th Central Committee of the Chinese Communist Party
Officeholder		7th	9th	Birth	PM	Death	Birthplace	Offices held	Ref.
Chen Boda	陈伯达	11th PLE	Elected	1904	1927	1989	Fujian	Two: Party office; Chairman, Central Cultural Revolution Group; President, People's Daily	
Chen Yi	陈毅	New	Not	1901	1922	1972	Sichuan	Four: State offices; Vice Premier of the People's Republic of China; Minister of Foreign Affairs; President, China Foreign Affairs University; Mayor, Shanghai Municipal People's Government	
Chen Yun	陈云	Old	Not	1905	1925	1995	Shanghai	Two: State offices; First-ranked Vice Premier of the People's Republic of China; Chairman, National Capital Construction Commission	
Deng Xiaoping	邓小平	Old	12th PLE	1904	1924	1997	Sichuan	One: Party office; Secretary-General, Central Committee Secretariat	
Dong Biwu	董必武	Old	Elected	1886	1921	1975	Hubei	Three: Party office; Secretary, Central Supervisory Commission of the Central Committee; State offices; Vice Chairman of the People's Republic of China; President, Supreme People's Court	
He Long	贺龙	New	12th PLE	1896	1926	1969	Hunan	One: State office; Vice Premier of the People's Republic of China	
Kang Sheng	康生	11th PLE	Elected	1898	1925	1975	Shandong	Two: Organisational office; Vice Chairman, National Committee of the Chinese People's Political Consultative Conference; State office; Vice Chairman, Standing Committee of the National People's Congress	
Ke Qingshi	柯庆施	6th PLE	Died	1902	1922	1965	Anhui	Two: Party office; Secretary, Shanghai Municipal Party Committee; State office; Mayor, Shanghai Municipal People's Government	
Li Fuchun	李富春	New	Not	1900	1922	1975	Hunan	One: State office; Chairman, State Planning Commission of the State Council of the People's Republic of China	
Li Jingquan	李井泉	6th PLE	11th PLE	1909	1922	1989	Jiangxi	Two: Party office; Secretary, Sichuan Provincial Party Committee; State office; Governor, Sichuan Provincial People's Government	
Li Xiannian	李先念	New	Elected	1909	1927	1992	Hubei	One: State office; Minister of Finance	
Lin Biao	林彪	Old	Elected	1907	1925	1971	Hubei	Five: Party office; First Vice Chairman, Central Committee; State offices; First-ranked Vice Premier of the People's Republic of China; Minister of National Defense, People's Republic of China; Military offices; Vice Chairman, Central Military Commission of the Central Committee; Vice Chairman, National Defense Council	
Lin Boqu	林伯渠	Old	Died	1886	1921	1960	Hunan	One: State office; Vice Chairman, Standing Committee of the National People's Congress	
Liu Bocheng	刘伯承	New	Elected	1892	1926	1986	Sichuan	Three: Military offices; Vice Chairman, Central Military Commission of the Central Committee; Vice Chairman, National Defense Council; State office; Vice Chairman, Standing Committee of the National People's Congress	
Liu Shaoqi	刘少奇	Old	12th PLE	1898	1921	1969	Henan	Three: Party office; First Vice Chairman, Central Committee; State office; Chairman of the People's Republic of China; Chairman, Standing Committee of the National People's Congress	
Luo Ronghuan	罗荣桓	New	Died	1902	1927	1963	Hunan	Two: Party office; Secretary, Central Political and Legal Affairs Commission of the Central Committee; State office; Secretary-General, Standing Committee of the National People's Congress	
Mao Zedong	毛泽东	Old	Elected	1893	1921	1976	Hunan	Three: Party office; Chairman, Central Committee; Military office; Chairman, Central Military Commission of the Central Committee; Chairman, National Defense Council; State office	
Nie Rongzhen	聂荣臻	11th PLE	Not	1899	1923	1992	Sichuan	Three: Military offices; Vice Chairman, Central Military Commission of the Central Committee; Vice Chairman, National Defense Council; State office; Vice Chairman, Standing Committee of the National People's Congress; Chairman, State Science and Technology Commission	
Peng Dehuai	彭德怀	New	Not	1898	1928	1974	Hunan	Two: State offices; Vice Premier of the People's Republic of China; Minister of National Defence	
Peng Zhen	彭真	Old	11th PLE	1902	1923	1997	Shanxi	Two: Party office; Secretary, Beijing Municipal Party Committee; State office; Mayor, Beijing Municipal People's Government	
Tan Zhenlin	谭震林	6th PLE	12th PLE	1902	1926	1983	Jiangxi	One: State office; Vice Premier of the People's Republic of China	
Tao Zhu	陶铸	11th PLE	12th PLE	1908	1926	1969	Hunan	Three: Party office; Head, Propaganda Department of the Central Committee; Secretary, Guangdong Provincial Party Committee; State office; Governor, Guangdong Provincial People's Government	
Xu Xiangqian	徐向前	11th PLE	Not	1901	1927	1990	Shanxi	One: Military office; Vice Chairman, National Defense Council	
Ye Jianying	叶剑英	11th PLE	Elected	1897	1927	1986	Guangdong	Two: Military offices; Secretary-General, Central Military Commission of the Central Committee; Political Commissar, Academy of Military Sciences of the People's Liberation Army	
Zhou Enlai	周恩来	Old	Elected	1898	1921	1976	Jiangsu	Three: Party office; First Vice Chairman, Central Committee; State office; Premier, State Council of the People's Republic of China; Organisational office; Chairman, National Committee of the Chinese People's Political Consultative Conference	
Zhu De	朱德	Old	Elected	1886	1925	1976	Sichuan	One: State office; Chairman, Standing Committee of the National People's Congress	

=== Alternates ===
Alternates of the Political Bureau of the 8th Central Committee of the Chinese Communist Party
Officeholder		7th	9th	Birth	PM	Death	Birthplace	Ethnicity	Offices held	Ref.
Bo Yibo	薄一波	New	11th PLE	1908	1925	2007	Shanxi	Han	One: State office; Vice Premier of the People's Republic of China	
Chen Boda	陈伯达	New	11th PLE	1904	1927	1989	Fujian	Han	Two: Party office; Chairman, Central Cultural Revolution Group; President, People's Daily	
Kang Sheng	康生	New	11th PLE	1898	1925	1975	Shandong	Han	Two: Organisational office; Vice Chairman, National Committee of the Chinese People's Political Consultative Conference; State office; Vice Chairman, Standing Committee of the National People's Congress	
Li Xuefeng	李雪峰	11th PLE	Alternate	1903	1933	2003	Shanxi	Han	One: Party office; Secretary, Beijing Municipal Party Committee	
Lu Dingyi	陆定一	New	11th PLE	1906	1925	1996	Jiangsu	Han	Two: State office; Vice Premier of the People's Republic of China; Minister of Culture	
Song Renqiong	宋任穷	11th PLE	12th PLE	1909	1926	2005	Hunan	Han	Three: Military office; Political Commissar, Shenyang Military Region of the People's Liberation Army; State office; Minister of the Third Ministry of Machine Industry; Minister of the Second Ministry of Machine Industry	
Ulanhu	乌兰夫	New	11th PLE	1907	1925	1988	Suiyuan	Tümed	Three: Party office; Secretary, Inner Mongolia Autonomous Region Party Committee; State offices; Minister, State Ethnic Affairs Commission; Governor, Inner Mongolia Autonomous Region People's Government	
Xie Fuzhi	谢富治	11th PLE	Member	1909	1931	1972	Hubei	Han	Two: State offices; Minister of Public Security; Chairman, Beijing Municipal Revolutionary Committee	
Zhang Wentian	张闻天	Member	Not	1900	1925	1976	Shanghai	Han	One: State office; Vice Minister of Foreign Affairs	
