= 9th Politburo of the Chinese Communist Party =

9th electoral term of the Political Bureau of the Chinese Communist Party

The 9th Politburo of the Chinese Communist Party (CCP), formally the Political Bureau of the 9th Central Committee of the Communist Party of China, was elected at the 1st plenary session of the 9th Central Committee of the CCP on 28 April 1969 in the aftermath of the 9th National Congress. This electoral term was preceded by the 8th Politburo and succeeded by the 10th. Five of the 21 members served concurrently in the 9th Politburo Standing Committee.

== Composition ==
=== Members ===
Members of the Political Bureau of the 9th Central Committee of the Chinese Communist Party
Officeholder		8th	10th	Birth	PM	Death	Birthplace	Gender	Offices held	Ref.
Chen Boda	陈伯达	Old	Purged	1904	1927	1989	Fujian	Male	One: Party office; Chairman, Central Cultural Revolution Group	
Chen Xilian	陈锡联	New	Elected	1915	1948	1999	Hubei	Male	One: Military office; Commander, Shenyang Military Region of the People's Liberation Army	
Dong Biwu	董必武	Old	Elected	1886	1921	1975	Hubei	Male	Two: State offices; Chairman, People's Republic of China (acting); Vice Chairman, People's Republic of China	
Huang Yongsheng	黄永胜	New	Coup	1910	1927	1983	Jiangxi	Male	Two: Military office; Commander, Beijing Military Region of the People's Liberation Army; State office; Vice Premier of the People's Republic of China	
Jiang Qing	江青	New	Elected	1914	1933	1991	Shandong	Female	One: Party office; Member, Cultural Revolution Group of the Central Committee	
Kang Sheng	康生	Old	Elected	1898	1925	1975	Shandong	Male	Three: Party offices; Vice Chairman, Central Committee; Leader, Central Organization and Propaganda Leading Group; State office; Vice Chairman, Standing Committee of the National People's Congress	
Li Xiannian	李先念	Old	Elected	1909	1927	1992	Hubei	Male	One: State office; First Deputy Chairman, Shanghai Municipal Revolutionary Committee	
Li Zuopeng	李作鹏	New	Coup	1914	1933	2003	Jiangxi	Male	One: Military office; Political Commissar, People's Liberation Army Navy	
Lin Biao	林彪	Old	Coup	1907	1925	1971	Hubei	Male	Five: Party office; First Vice Chairman, Central Committee; State offices; First-ranked Vice Premier, State Council of the People's Republic of China; Minister of National Defense, People's Republic of China; Military offices; Vice Chairman, Central Military Commission of the Central Committee; Vice Chairman, National Defense Council	
Liu Bocheng	刘伯承	Old	Elected	1892	1926	1986	Sichuan	Male	One: State office; Vice Chairman, Standing Committee of the National People's Congress	
Mao Zedong	毛泽东	Old	Elected	1893	1921	1976	Hunan	Male	Two: Party office; Chairman, Central Committee; Military office; Chairman, Central Military Commission of the Central Committee	
Qiu Huizuo	邱会作	New	Coup	1914	1932	2002	Jiangxi	Male	One: Military office; Head, General Logistics Department of the Central Military Commission	
Wu Faxian	吴法宪	New	Coup	1915	1932	2004	Jiangxi	Male	One: Military office; Commander, People's Liberation Army Air Force	
Xie Fuzhi	谢富治	Alternate	Died	1909	1931	1972	Hubei	Male	Three: Party office; Secretary, Beijing Municipal Party Committee; State offices; Minister of Public Security; Chairman, Beijing Municipal Revolutionary Committee	
Xu Shiyou	许世友	New	Elected	1906	1927	1985	Henan	Male	One: Military office; Commander, Nanjing Military Region of the People's Liberation Army	
Yao Wenyuan	姚文元	New	Elected	1931	1948	2005	Zhejiang	Male	One: Party office; First Deputy Chairman, Shanghai Municipal Revolutionary Committee	
Ye Jianying	叶剑英	Old	Elected	1897	1927	1986	Guangdong	Male	Two: Military offices; Secretary-General, Central Military Commission of the Central Committee; Political Commissar, Academy of Military Sciences of the People's Liberation Army	
Ye Qun	叶群	New	Coup	1917	1938	1971	Henan	Female	One: Military office; Deputy Head, Cultural Revolution Group of the People's Liberation Army	
Zhang Chunqiao	张春桥	Old	Elected	1917	1938	2005	Shandong	Male	Two: Party office; Secretary, Shanghai Municipal Committee; State office; Chairman, Shanghai Municipal Revolutionary Committee	
Zhou Enlai	周恩来	Old	Elected	1898	1921	1976	Jiangsu	Male	Three: Party office; First Vice Chairman, Central Committee; State office; Premier, State Council of the People's Republic of China; Organisational office; Chairman, National Committee of the Chinese People's Political Consultative Conference	
Zhu De	朱德	Old	Elected	1886	1925	1976	Sichuan	Male	One: State office; Chairman, Standing Committee of the National People's Congress	

=== Alternates ===
Alternates of the Political Bureau of the 9th Central Committee of the Chinese Communist Party
Officeholder		8th	10th	Birth	PM	Death	Birthplace	Gender	Offices held	Ref.
Ji Dengkui	纪登奎	New	Member	1923	1938	1988	Shanxi	Male	One: Military office; First Political Commissar, Beijing Military Region of the People's Liberation Army	
Li Desheng	李德生	New	Member	1916	1932	2011	Henan	Male	Four: Party office; Secretary, Anui Provincial Party Committee; Military offices; Director, General Political Department of the People's Liberation Army; Commander, Beijing Military Region of the People's Liberation Army; State office; Chairman, Anhui Provincial Revolutionary Committee	
Li Xuefeng	李雪峰	Alternate	Purged	1903	1933	2003	Shanxi	Male	Two: Military office; Political Commissar, Hebei Provincial Military District of the People's Liberation Army; State office; Chairman, Hebei Provincial Revolutionary Committee	
Wang Dongxing	汪东兴	New	Member	1916	1932	2015	Jiangxi	Male	One: Party offices; Director, General Office of the Central Committee	
