= 10th Politburo of the Chinese Communist Party =

10th electoral term of the Political Bureau of the Chinese Communist Party

The 10th Politburo of the Chinese Communist Party (CCP), formally the Political Bureau of the 10th Central Committee of the Communist Party of China, was elected at the 1st plenary session of the 10th Central Committee of the CCP on 30 August 1973 in the aftermath of the 10th National Congress. This electoral term was preceded by the 9th Politburo and succeeded by the 11th. 11 of the 22 members served concurrently in the 10th Politburo Standing Committee.

== Composition ==
=== Members ===
Members of the Political Bureau of the 10th Central Committee of the Chinese Communist Party
| Officeholder | | 9th | 11th | Birth | PM | Death | Birthplace | Ethnicity | Gender | Offices held | Ref. |
|---|---|---|---|---|---|---|---|---|---|---|---|
| Chen Xilian | 陈锡联 | Old | Elected | 1915 | 1948 | 1999 | Hubei | Han | Male | Two: Military office; Commander, Beijing Military Region of the People's Liberation Army; State office; Vice Premier of the People's Republic of China | |
| Chen Yonggui | 陈永贵 | New | Elected | 1914 | 1948 | 1986 | Shanxi | Han | Male | One: State office; Vice Premier of the People's Republic of China | |
| Deng Xiaoping (Note: Was elected a member of the Politburo at the 2nd plenary session of the 10th Central Committee on 8–10 1975, removed from the Politburo by a decision of the Politburo on 6–7 April 1976 and reelected to the Politburo by the 3rd plenary session on 16–21 July 1977.) | 邓小平 | 2nd PLE | Elected | 1904 | 1924 | 1997 | Sichuan | Han | Male | Four: Party office; Vice Chairman, Central Committee; State office; First-ranked Vice Premier, State Council of the People's Republic of China; Military offices; Vice Chairman, Central Military Commission of the Central Committee; Chief, General Staff Department of the Central Military Commission | |
| Dong Biwu | 董必武 | Old | Died | 1886 | 1921 | 1975 | Hubei | Han | Male | Two: State offices; Chairman, People's Republic of China (acting); Vice Chairman, People's Republic of China | |
| Hua Guofeng | 华国锋 | New | Elected | 1921 | 1938 | 2008 | Shanxi | Han | Male | Seven: Party offices; Chairman, Central Committee (from October 1976); First Vice Chairman, Central Committee (April–October 1976); Secretary, Hunan Provincial Committee (before April 1976); State offices; Chairman Shanghai Municipal Revolutionary Committee (before 1976); Minister of Public Security, People's Republic of China; Premier, State Council of the People's Republic of China (from 1976); Military office; Chairman, Central Military Commission of the Central Committee (from 1976) | |
| Ji Dengkui | 纪登奎 | Alternate | Elected | 1923 | 1938 | 1988 | Shanxi | Han | Male | One: Party office; Vice Premier of the People's Republic of China | |
| Jiang Qing | 江青 | Old | Purged | 1914 | 1933 | 1991 | Shandong | Han | Female | One: Party office; Member, Cultural Revolution Group of the Central Committee | |
| Kang Sheng | 康生 | Old | Died | 1898 | 1925 | 1975 | Shandong | Han | Male | Three: Party offices; Vice Chairman, Central Committee; Leader, Central Organization and Propaganda Leading Group; State office; Vice Chairman, Standing Committee of the National People's Congress | |
| Li Desheng | 李德生 | Alternate | Elected | 1916 | 1932 | 2011 | Henan | Han | Male | Three: Party office; Vice Chairman, Central Committee; Military offices; Director, General Political Department of the People's Liberation Army; Commander, Shenyang Military Region of the People's Liberation Army | |
| Li Xiannian | 李先念 | Old | Elected | 1909 | 1927 | 1992 | Hubei | Han | Male | One: State office; First Deputy Chairman, Shanghai Municipal Revolutionary Committee | |
| Liu Bocheng | 刘伯承 | Old | Elected | 1892 | 1926 | 1986 | Sichuan | Han | Male | One: State office; Vice Chairman, Standing Committee of the National People's Congress | |
| Mao Zedong | 毛泽东 | Old | Died | 1893 | 1921 | 1976 | Hunan | Han | Male | Two: Party office; Chairman, Central Committee; Military office; Chairman, Central Military Commission of the Central Committee | |
| Wang Dongxing | 汪东兴 | Alternate | Elected | 1916 | 1932 | 2015 | Jiangxi | Han | Male | One: Party offices; Director, General Office of the Central Committee | |
| Wang Hongwen | 王洪文 | New | Purged | 1935 | 1951 | 1992 | Jilin | Han | Male | Two: Party office; Vice Chairman, Central Committee; Military office; Member, Standing Committee of the Central Military Commission of the Central Committee | |
| Wei Guoqing | 韦国清 | New | Elected | 1913 | 1931 | 1989 | Guangxi | Zhuang | Male | Two: Party office; Secretary, Guangdong Provincial Party Committee; State office; Vice Chairman, Standing Committee of the National People's Congress | |
| Wu De | 吴德 | New | Elected | 1913 | 1933 | 1995 | Hebei | Han | Male | One: Party office; Secretary, Beijing Municipal Party Committee | |
| Xu Shiyou | 许世友 | Old | Elected | 1906 | 1927 | 1985 | Henan | Han | Male | One: Military office; Commander, Guangzhou Military Region of the People's Liberation Army | |
| Yao Wenyuan | 姚文元 | Old | Purged | 1931 | 1948 | 2005 | Zhejiang | Han | Male | One: Party office; First Deputy Chairman, Shanghai Municipal Revolutionary Committee | |
| Ye Jianying | 叶剑英 | Old | Elected | 1897 | 1927 | 1986 | Guangdong | Han | Male | Three: Party office; Vice Chairman, Central Committee; Military offices; Vice Chairman, Central Military Commission of the Central Committee; Vice Chairman, National Defense Council | |
| Zhang Chunqiao | 张春桥 | Old | Purged | 1917 | 1938 | 2005 | Shandong | Han | Male | Three: Party office; Secretary, Shanghai Municipal Committee; State offices; Vice Premier, State Council of the People's Republic of China; Chairman, Shanghai Municipal Revolutionary Committee | |
| Zhou Enlai | 周恩来 | Old | Died | 1898 | 1921 | 1976 | Jiangsu | Han | Male | Three: Party office; First Vice Chairman, Central Committee; State office; Premier, State Council of the People's Republic of China; Organisational office; Chairman, National Committee of the Chinese People's Political Consultative Conference | |
| Zhu De | 朱德 | Old | Died | 1886 | 1925 | 1976 | Sichuan | Han | Male | One: State office; Chairman, Standing Committee of the National People's Congress | |

=== Alternates ===
Alternates of the Political Bureau of the 10th Central Committee of the Chinese Communist Party
| Officeholder | | 9th | 11th | Birth | PM | Death | Birthplace | Ethnicity | Gender | Offices held | Ref. |
|---|---|---|---|---|---|---|---|---|---|---|---|
| Ni Zhifu | 倪志福 | New | Member | 1933 | 1958 | 2013 | Shanghai | Han | Male | Two: Party office; Secretary, Beijing Municipal Party Committee; State office; Deputy Chairman, Beijing Municipal Revolutionary Committee | |
| Saifuddin Azizi | 赛福鼎·艾则孜 | New | Alternate | 1915 | 1949 | 2003 | Xinjiang | Uyghur | Male | Two: Party office; Secretary, Xinjiang Uyghur Autonomous Region Party Committee; State office; Vice Chairman, Standing Committee of the National People's Congress | |
| Su Zhenhua | 苏振华 | New | Member | 1912 | 1930 | 1979 | Hunan | Han | Male | Two: State offices; Secretary, Shanghai Revolutionary Committee; Mayor of Shanghai Municipal People's Government | |
| Wu Guixian | 吴桂贤 | New | Not | 1938 | 1958 | 2025 | Henan | Han | Female | One: State office; Vice Premier of the People's Republic of China | |
