= Deng Xiaoping =

Leader of China from 1978 to 1989

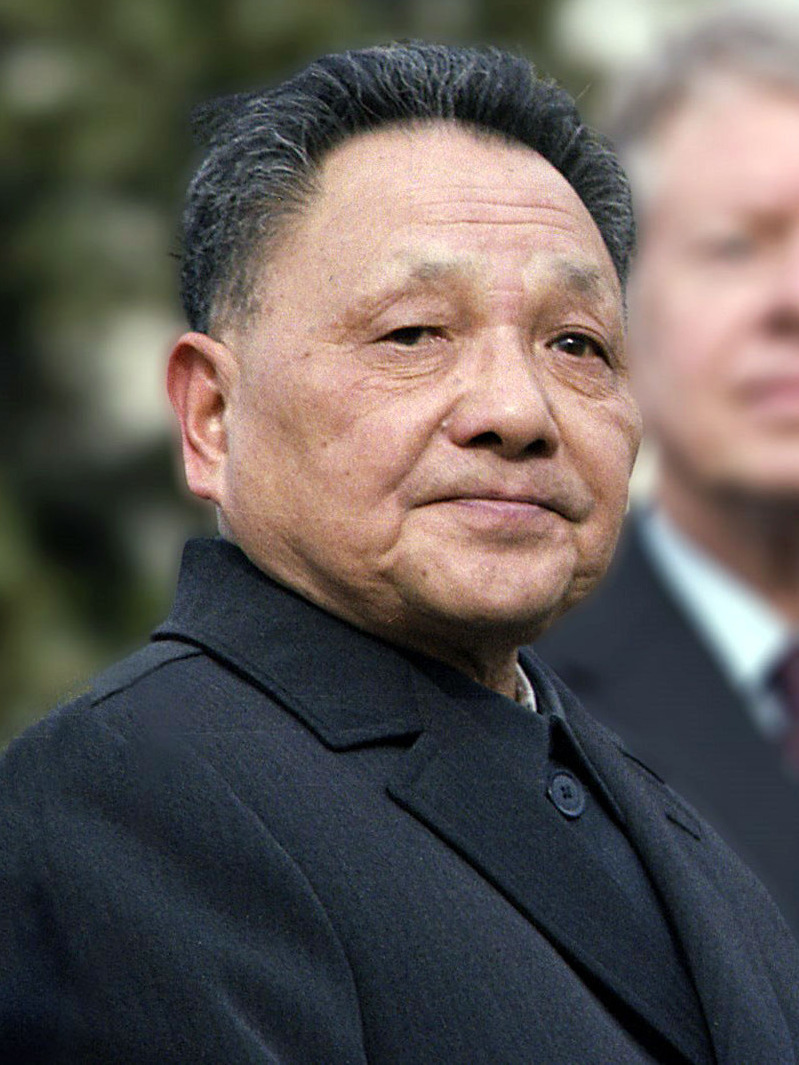
- Deng in 1979

Chairman of the Central Advisory Commission
- In office 13 September 1982 – 2 November 1987
- Preceded by: Office established
- Succeeded by: Chen Yun

Chairman of the Central Military Commission
- In office State Commission: 6 June 1983 – 19 March 1990
- President: Li Xiannian
- Premier: Zhao Ziyang
- Deputy: See list: Xu Shiyou Tan Zhenlin Li Weihan Wang Zhen Bo Yibo Song Renqiong
- General Secretary: Hu Yaobang; Zhao Ziyang (acting)
- Preceded by: Office established
- Succeeded by: Jiang Zemin
- In office Party Commission: 28 June 1981 – 9 November 1989
- Deputy: See list: Ye Jianying Yang Shangkun Zhao Ziyang Liu Bocheng Nie Rongzhen Xu Xiangqian
- General Secretary: Hu Yaobang; Zhao Ziyang; Jiang Zemin
- Preceded by: Hua Guofeng
- Succeeded by: Jiang Zemin

3rd Chairman of the National Committee of the Chinese People's Political Consultative Conference
- In office 8 March 1978 – 17 June 1983
- Preceded by: Zhou Enlai (until 1976)
- Succeeded by: Deng Yingchao

Vice Premier of China
- In office September 1954 – October 1968
- Premier: Zhou Enlai

Personal details
- Born: Deng Xiansheng; 22 August 1904 Guang'an, Sichuan Province, Qing Empire
- Died: 19 February 1997 (aged 92) Beijing, People's Republic of China
- Party: Chinese Communist Party (from 1924)
- Spouses: Zhang Xiyuan (m. 1928; died 1929) Jin Weiying (m. 1931–1939) Zhuo Lin (m. 1939)
- Children: 6, including: Deng Pufang; Deng Nan; Deng Rong
- Relatives: Deng family
- Education: Moscow Sun Yat-sen University
- Website: cpc.people.com.cn

Military service
- Branch/service: Chinese Red Army; National Revolutionary Army; People's Liberation Army
- Years of service: 1929–1952; 1975–1980
- Rank: Political Commissar (1929‍–‍1952); Chief of the General Staff (1975–1976; 1977–1980)
- Unit: Chinese Red Army; Eighth Route Army; Second Field Army; People's Liberation Army General Staff Department
- Battles/wars: Chinese Civil War; Second Sino-Japanese War
- Central institution membership: 1975–1976, 1977–1987: 10th, 11th, 12th Politburo Standing Committee; 1956–1967: 8th Politburo Standing Committee; 1975–1976, 1977–1987: 10th, 11th, 12th Politburo; 1956–1967: 8th Politburo; 1945–1967, 1973–1976, 1977–1987: 7th, 8th, 10th, 11th, 12th Central Committee; 1954–1967, 1973–1976, 1977–1989: 8th, 10th, 11th, 12th, 13th Central Military Commission; 1978–1997: 5th, 6th, 7th, 8th National People's Congress; 1959–1964: 2nd National People's Congress; Other political offices held: 1977–1982: Vice Chairman, Central Committee; 1977–1980: 1st-ranked Vice Premier; 1975–1976: Vice Chairman, Central Committee; 1975–1976: 1st-ranked Vice Premier; 1973–1975: Vice Premier; 1964–1965: Head, Organization Department; 1954–1967: Vice Premier; 1953–1954: Director, Office of Communications; Military offices held: 1977–1981: Vice Chairman, Central Military Commission; 1975–1976: Vice Chairman, Central Military Commission; 1954–1967: Vice Chairman, National Defense Commission

Chinese name
- Simplified Chinese: 邓小平
- Traditional Chinese: 鄧小平
Transcriptions
Standard Mandarin
- Hanyu Pinyin: Dèng Xiǎopíng
- Wade–Giles: Teng^{4} Hsiao^{3}-pʻing^{2}
- IPA: [tə̂ŋ ɕjàʊ.pʰǐŋ]
- Paramount Leader of the People's Republic of China: ← Hua Guofeng; Jiang Zemin →

Deng Xiaoping (Note: /ˈdʌŋ ʃaʊˈpɪŋ/, also UK: /ˈdɛŋ -, - ˈsjaʊpɪŋ/; Chinese: 邓小平; pinyin: Dèng Xiǎopíng also romanised as Teng Hsiao-p'ing; born Xiansheng (先圣).) (22 August 1904 – 19 February 1997) was a Chinese statesman, revolutionary, and political theorist who served as the paramount leader of the People's Republic of China (PRC) from 1978 to 1989. Emerging as China's most influential figure after Mao Zedong's death in 1976, Deng consolidated political power and guided the country into an era of reform and opening up that transitioned the nation toward a socialist market economy. Credited as the "architect of modern China", he is recognized for shaping both socialism with Chinese characteristics and Deng Xiaoping Theory.

Born into a landowning peasant family in Sichuan, Deng was introduced to Marxism–Leninism while studying and working in France during the 1920s as part of the Work–Study Movement. He then studied in Moscow and, after returning to China, joined the Chinese Communist Party (CCP) in 1924. During the Chinese Civil War, he worked in the Jiangxi Soviet and maintained close ties with Mao. Despite being purged in 1933, Deng was rehabilitated at the Zunyi Conference and later served as a political commissar in the Chinese Red Army during the Long March and Second Sino-Japanese War, helping secure CCP victory in 1949 and taking part in the People's Liberation Army (PLA) capture of Nanjing.

Following Mao's founding of the PRC, Deng rose to prominence as the vice premier of China and CCP secretary-general, overseeing the annexation of Tibet, economic reconstruction and playing a leading role in the Anti-Rightist Campaign. Ιn the mid-1960s, economic policy initiatives and the proclamation of the Four Modernizations marked the peak of Deng's Mao-era influence. However, during the Cultural Revolution, he was denounced as the party's "number two capitalist roader" after Liu Shaoqi and was twice purged by Mao, spending four years working in a tractor factory before returning to politics. After Mao's death in 1976, Deng outmaneuvered political rivals and became China's paramount leader by 1978.

Upon coming to power, Deng began a massive overhaul of China's infrastructure and political system. Due to institutional disorder and turmoil from the Mao era, he and allies launched the Boluan Fanzheng program which sought to restore order by rehabilitating those persecuted during the Cultural Revolution. His reform and opening up policies introduced market incentives, established special economic zones, encouraged foreign investment, and accelerated China's integration into the global economy. Deng also pursued major state reforms, including constitutional term limits (enshrined in the 1982 Constitution of China), the one-child policy to address population growth, dismantling promotion of traditional medicine and the barefoot doctors program, a nine-year compulsory education system, and promotion of technology through the 863 Program. These changes shifted China away from a command economy and Maoist orthodoxy, laying the foundation for decades of rapid economic growth. Furthermore, as the overseer of Beijing's foreign policy, Deng negotiated the handover of Hong Kong and handover of Macau and formulated the guiding principle of "one country, two systems". Following his tenure as paramount leader, Deng's southern tour in 1992 consolidated his political legacy and was crucial to the continuation of economic reform in China.

Deng received worldwide acclaim and was named Time Person of the Year in 1978 and 1985 for his policies and reforms. Despite contributions to China's modernization, Deng's legacy is also marked by controversy. He ordered the crackdown on the 1989 Tiananmen Square protests, which halted his political reforms and remains a subject of international condemnation. Nonetheless, Deng's policies facilitated China's rise to become one of the world's great powers. He was succeeded by Jiang Zemin, who continued his reform agenda.

== Early life and family ==
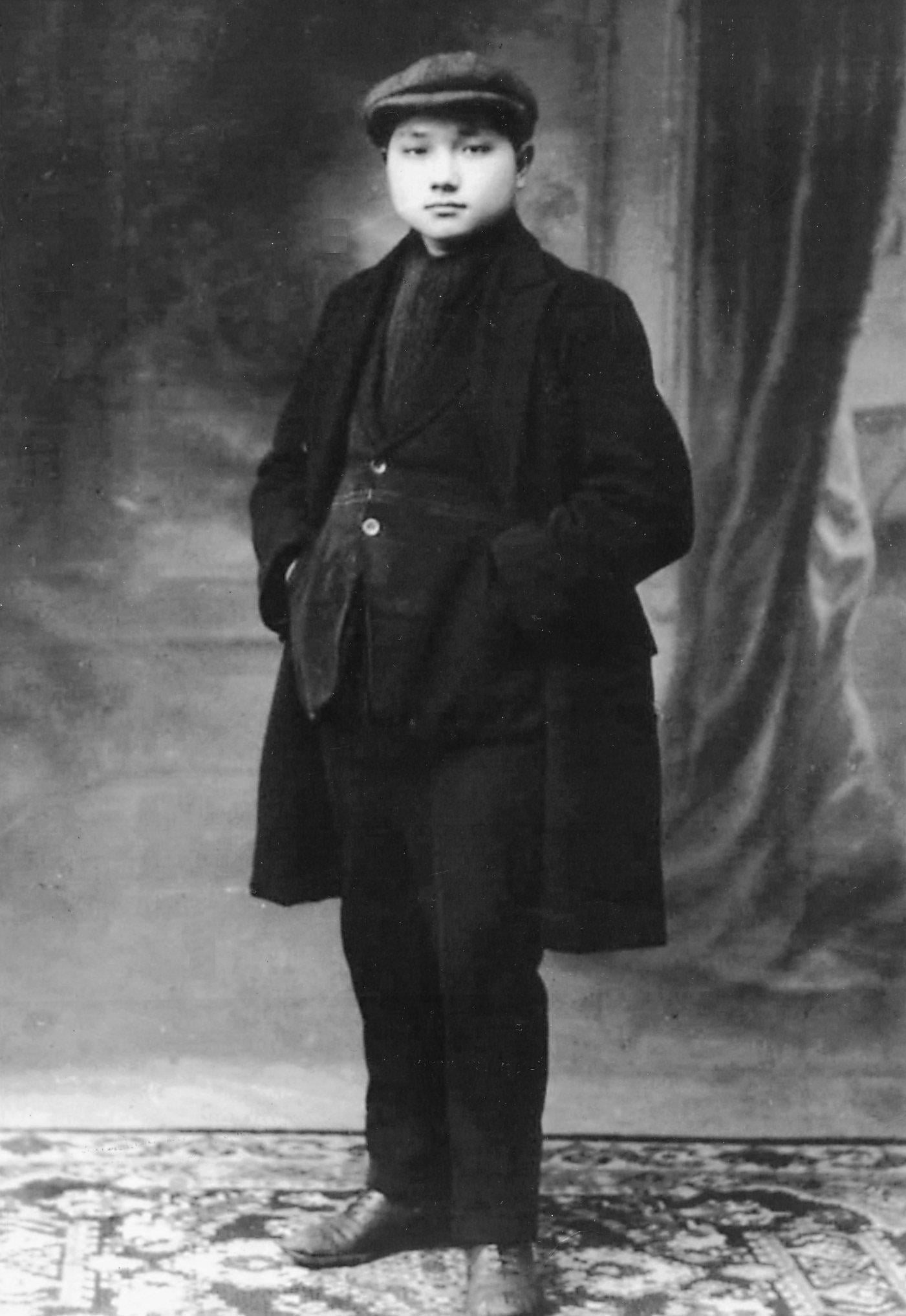
Deng Xiaoping at age 16, studying in France (1921)

Deng's ancestors can be traced back to Jiaying County (now renamed as Meixian), Guangdong, a prominent ancestral area for the Hakka people, and had settled in Sichuan for several generations. Deng's daughter Deng Rong wrote in the book My Father Deng Xiaoping (我的父亲邓小平) that his ancestry was probably, but not definitely, Hakka. Sichuan was originally the origin of the Deng lineage until one of them was hired as an official in Guangdong during the Ming dynasty, but when the Qing dynasty planned to increase the population in 1671, they moved back to Sichuan. Deng was born in Guang'an District, Guang'an on 22 August 1904 in Sichuan province.

Deng's father, Deng Wenming, was a mid-level landowner who had studied at the University of Law and Political Science in Chengdu, Sichuan. He was locally prominent. His mother, surnamed Dan, died early in Deng's life, leaving Deng, his three brothers, and three sisters. At the age of five, Deng was sent to a traditional Chinese-style private primary school, followed by a more modern primary school at the age of seven.

Deng's first wife, one of his schoolmates from Moscow, died aged 24 a few days after giving birth to their first child, a baby girl who also died. His second wife, Jin Weiying, left him after Deng came under political attack in 1933. His third wife, Zhuo Lin, was the daughter of an industrialist in Yunnan. She became a member of the Communist Party in 1938, and married Deng a year later in front of Mao's cave dwelling in Yan'an. They had five children: three daughters (Deng Lin, Deng Nan and Deng Rong) and two sons (Deng Pufang and Deng Zhifang). Deng quit smoking when he was 86.

=== Education and early career ===
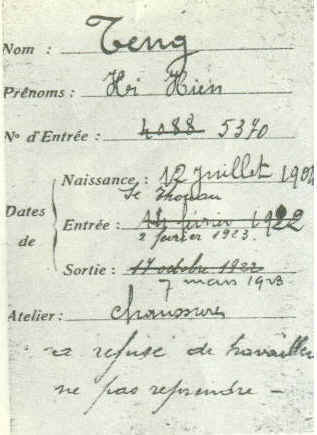
Deng's name is spelled "Teng Hi Hien" on this employment card from the Hutchinson shoe factory in Châlette-sur-Loing, France, where he worked for eight months in 1922, and for another stint in 1923 where he was fired after one month, with the bottom note reading 'refused to work, do not take him back'

Deng's given name was Xiansheng (先圣) meaning "ancient sage", a title of Confucius. When Deng first attended school, his tutor objected to him having the given name Xiansheng, instead calling him "Xixian" (希贤), which includes the characters "to aspire to" and "goodness", with overtones of wisdom.

In the summer of 1919, Deng graduated from the Chongqing School. He and 80 schoolmates travelled by ship to France (travelling steerage) to participate in the Diligent Work-Frugal Study Movement, a work-study program in which 4,001 Chinese would participate by 1927. Deng, the youngest of all the Chinese students in the group, had just turned 15. Wu Yuzhang, the local leader of the Movement in Chongqing, enrolled Deng and his paternal uncle, Deng Shaosheng, in the program. Deng's father strongly supported his son's participation in the work-study abroad program. The night before his departure, Deng's father took his son aside and asked him what he hoped to learn in France. He repeated the words he had learned from his teachers: "To learn knowledge and truth from the West in order to save China." Deng was aware that China was suffering greatly, and that the Chinese people must have a modern education to save their country.

On 19 October 1920, a French packet ship, the André Lebon, sailed into Marseille with 210 Chinese students aboard including Deng. The sixteen-year-old Deng briefly attended middle schools in Bayeux and Châtillon, but he spent most of his time in France working, including at a Renault factory and as a fitter at the Le Creusot Iron and Steel Plant in La Garenne-Colombes, a north-western suburb of Paris where he moved in April 1921. Coincidentally, when Deng's later political fortunes were down and he was sent to work in a tractor factory in 1969 during the Cultural Revolution, he found himself a fitter again and proved to still be a master of the skill.

In La Garenne-Colombes Deng met future CCP leaders Zhou Enlai, Chen Yi, Nie Rongzhen, Li Fuchun, Li Lisan and Li Weihan. In June 1923 he joined the Chinese Communist Youth League in Europe. In the second half of 1924, he joined the Chinese Communist Party and became one of the leading members of the Youth League in Europe. In 1926 Deng traveled to the Soviet Union and studied at Moscow Sun Yat-sen University, where one of his classmates was Chiang Ching-kuo, the son of Chiang Kai-shek.

=== Return to China ===
In late 1927, Deng left Moscow to return to the Republic of China, where he joined the army of Feng Yuxiang, a military leader in northwest China, who had requested assistance from the Soviet Union in his struggle with other local leaders in the region. At that time, the Soviet Union, through the Comintern, an international organization supporting the Communist movements, supported the Communists' alliance with the Nationalists of the Kuomintang (KMT) party founded by Sun Yat-sen.

He arrived in Xi'an, the stronghold of Feng Yuxiang, in March 1927. He was part of the Guominjun's attempt to prevent the break of the alliance between the KMT and the Communists. This split resulted in part from Chiang Kai-shek's forcing them to flee areas controlled by the KMT. After the breakup of the alliance between Communists and Nationalists, Feng Yuxiang stood on the side of Chiang Kai-shek, and the Communists who participated in their army, such as Deng Xiaoping, were forced to flee.

== Political rise ==
Although Deng got involved in the Marxist revolutionary movement in China, the historian Mobo Gao has argued that "Deng Xiaoping and many like him [in the Chinese Communist Party] were not really Marxists, but basically revolutionary nationalists who wanted to see China standing on equal terms with the great global powers. They were primarily nationalists and they participated in the Communist revolution because that was the only viable route they could find to Chinese nationalism."

=== Activism in Shanghai and Wuhan ===
After leaving the army of Feng Yuxiang in the northwest, Deng ended up in the city of Wuhan, where the Communists at that time had their headquarters. At that time, he began using the nickname "Xiaoping" and occupied prominent positions in the party apparatus. He participated in the historic emergency session on 7 August 1927 in which, by Soviet instruction, the Party dismissed its founder Chen Duxiu, and Qu Qiubai became the general secretary. In Wuhan, Deng first established contact with Mao Zedong, who was then little valued by militant pro-Soviet leaders of the party.

Between 1927 and 1929, Deng lived in Shanghai, where he helped organize protests that would be harshly persecuted by the Kuomintang authorities. The death of many Communist militants in those years led to a decrease in the number of members of the Communist Party, which enabled Deng to quickly move up the ranks.

Deng married Zhang Xiyuan, who died in 1930 during childbirth. The couple's daughter also died during her birth.

=== Military campaign in Guangxi ===
From 1929 to 1931, Deng served as the chief representative of the Central Committee in Guangxi, where he helped lead the Baise and Longzhou Uprisings. Both at the time and later, Deng Xiaoping's leadership during the rebellion has come under serious criticism. He followed the "Li Lisan Line" that called for aggressive attacks on cities. In practice, this meant that the rural soviet in Guangxi was abandoned and that the Seventh Red Army under Deng's political leadership fought and lost several bloody battles. Eventually, Deng and the other Communist leaders in Guangxi decided to retreat to Jiangxi to join Mao Zedong. However, after a costly march across rough terrain, Deng left the army leaderless without prior authorization to do so. A Central Committee post-mortem in 1931 singled out Deng's behavior as an example of "rightist opportunism and a rich peasant line". In 1945, several former commanders of the Seventh Red Army spoke out against Deng for his actions during the uprising, although Mao Zedong protected Deng from any serious repercussions. During the Cultural Revolution, Red Guards learned about the events of the Baise Uprising and accused Deng of desertion. Deng admitted that leaving the army was one of the "worst mistakes of [his] life" and that "although this action was allowed by the party, it was politically horribly wrong." Modern historians and biographers tend to agree. Uli Franz calls leaving the army a "serious error". Benjamin Yang calls it a "tragic failure and dark period in [Deng's] political life." On the other hand, Diana Lary places blame for the disaster more broadly on the "ineptitude" of both the local leaders and the CCP Central Committee.

=== At the Jiangxi Soviet ===
The campaigns against the Communists in the cities represented a setback for the party and in particular to the Comintern Soviet advisers, who saw the mobilization of the urban proletariat as the force for the advancement of communism. Contrary to the urban vision of the revolution, based on the Soviet experience, the Communist leader Mao Zedong saw the rural peasants as the revolutionary force in China. In a mountainous area of Jiangxi province, where Mao went to establish a communist system, there developed the embryo of a future state of China under communism, which adopted the official name of the Chinese Soviet Republic (CSR) and which included the Jiangxi Soviet.

In August 1931, Deng went to Ruijin, which became the capital of the CSR, and became secretary of its Party Committee in the summer of 1931. In the winter of 1932, Deng went on to play the same position in the nearby district of Huichang. In 1933 he became director of the Publicity Department of the Provincial Party Committee in Jiangxi.

As a supporter of Mao, Deng was criticized by elements of the Party which opposed Mao and was removed from his position in 1933. During Deng's 1933 political setbacks, his wife Jin Weiying deserted him for one of his political opponents.

The CSR reached its peak in 1933. The CSR had a central government as well as local and regional governments. It operated institutions including an education system and court system. The CSR also issued currency. It governed a population which exceeded 3.4 million in an area of approximately 70,000 square kilometers (although the isolated soviets were never connected into one contiguous piece of territory). The CSR was defeated by Chiang Kai-shek and the Nationalists, leading to the Long March.

=== Long March ===
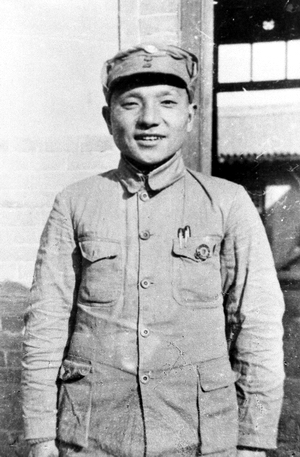
Deng Xiaoping in NRA uniform, 1937

Surrounded by the more powerful nationalist army, the Communists fled Jiangxi in October 1934. Thus began the epic movement that would mark a turning point in the development of Chinese communism. The evacuation was difficult because the Army of the nationalists had taken positions in all areas occupied by the Communists. Advancing through remote and mountainous terrain, some 100,000 men managed to escape Jiangxi, starting a long strategic retreat through the interior of China, which ended one year later when between 8,000 and 9,000 survivors reached the northern province of Shaanxi.

During the Zunyi Conference at the beginning of the Long March, the so-called 28 Bolsheviks, led by Bo Gu and Wang Ming, were ousted from power and Mao Zedong, to the dismay of the Soviet Union, became the new leader of the Chinese Communist Party. The pro-Soviet Chinese Communist Party had ended and a new rural-inspired party emerged under the leadership of Mao. Deng had once again become a leading figure in the party.

The confrontation between the two parties was temporarily interrupted, however, by the Japanese invasion, forcing the Kuomintang to form an alliance for the second time with the Communists to defend the nation against external aggression.

=== Japanese invasion ===
The invasion of Japanese troops in 1937 marked the beginning of the Second Sino-Japanese War. During the invasion, Deng remained in the area controlled by the Communists in the north, where he assumed the role of deputy political director of the three divisions of the restructured Communist army. From September 1937 until January 1938, he lived in Buddhist monasteries and temples in the Wutai Mountains. In January 1938, he was appointed as Political Commissar of the 129th division of the Eighth Route Army commanded by Liu Bocheng, starting a long-lasting partnership with Liu.

Deng stayed for most of the conflict with the Japanese in the war front in the area bordering the provinces of Shanxi, Henan and Hebei, then traveled several times to the city of Yan'an, where Mao had established the basis for Communist Party leadership. While in Henan, he delivered the famous report, "The Victorious Situation of Leaping into the Central Plains and Future Policies and Strategies", at a Gospel Hall where he lived for some time. In one of his trips to Yan'an in 1939, he married, for the third and last time in his life, Zhuo Lin, a young native of Kunming, who, like other young idealists of the time, had traveled to Yan'an to join the Communists.

Deng was considered a "revolutionary veteran" because of his participation in the Long March. He took a leading role in the Hundred Regiments Offensive which boosted his standing among his comrades.

=== Resumed war against the Nationalists ===
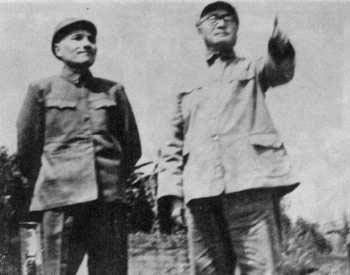
Deng with Liu Bocheng (right)

After Japan's defeat in World War II, Deng traveled to Chongqing, the city in which Chiang Kai-shek established his government during the Japanese invasion, to participate in peace talks between the Kuomintang and the Communist Party. The results of those negotiations were not positive and military confrontation between the two antagonistic parties resumed shortly after the meeting in Chongqing.

While Chiang Kai-shek re-established the government in Nanjing, the capital of the Republic of China, the Communists were fighting for control in the field. Following up with guerrilla tactics from their positions in rural areas against cities under the control of the government of Chiang and their supply lines, the Communists were increasing the territory under their control, and incorporating more and more soldiers who had deserted the Nationalist army.

Deng played a major part in the Huaihai Campaign against the nationalists.

In the final phase of the war, Deng again exercised a key role as political leader and propaganda master as Political Commissar of the 2nd Field Army commanded by Liu Bocheng where he was instrumental in the PLA's march into Tibet. He also participated in disseminating the ideas of Mao Zedong, which turned into the ideological foundation of the Communist Party. His political and ideological work, along with his status as a veteran of the Long March, placed him in a privileged position within the party to occupy positions of power after the Communist Party managed to defeat Chiang Kai-shek and founded the People's Republic of China.

== Political career under Mao ==
=== Local leadership ===
On 1 October 1949, Deng attended the proclamation of the People's Republic of China in Beijing. At that time, the Communist Party controlled the entire north, but there were still parts of the south held by the Kuomintang regime. He became responsible for leading the pacification of southwest China, in his capacity as the first secretary of the Department of the Southwest. This organization had the task of managing the final takeover of that part of the country still held by the Kuomintang; Tibet remained independent for another year.

The Kuomintang government was being forced to leave Guangzhou (Canton), and established Chongqing (Chungking) as a new provisional capital. There, Chiang Kai-shek and his son Chiang Ching-kuo, a former classmate of Deng in Moscow, wanted to stop the advance of the Communist Party forces.

Under the political control of Deng, the Communist army took over Chongqing in late November 1949 and entered Chengdu, the last bastion of power of Chiang Kai-shek, a few days later. At that time Deng became mayor of Chongqing, while he simultaneously was the leader of the Communist Party in the southwest, where the Communist army, now proclaiming itself the People's Liberation Army, suppressed resistance loyal to the old Kuomintang regime. In 1950, the Communist Party-ruled state also seized control over Tibet.

In a 1951 speech to cadres preparing to supervise campaigns in the land reform movement, Deng instructed that while cadres should help peasants carry out nonviolent "speak reason struggle", they also had to remember that as a mass movement, land reform was not a time to be "refined and gentle". Expressing his view as a rhetorical question, Deng stated that while ideally no landlords would die in the process, "If some tightfisted landlords hang themselves, does that mean our policies are wrong? Are we responsible?"

Deng Xiaoping would spend three years in Chongqing, the city where he had studied in his teenage years before going to France. In 1952 he moved to Beijing, where he occupied different positions in the central government.

=== Political rise in Beijing ===
In July 1952, Deng came to Beijing to assume the posts of Vice Premier and Deputy Chair of the Committee on Finance. Soon after, he took the posts of Minister of Finance and Director of the Office of Communications. In 1954, he was removed from all these positions, holding only the post of Vice Premier. In 1956, he became Head of the Communist Party's Organization Department and member of the Central Military Commission.

After officially supporting Mao Zedong in his Anti-Rightist Movement of 1957, Deng acted as Secretary-General of the Secretariat and ran the country's daily affairs with President Liu Shaoqi and Premier Zhou Enlai. Deng and Liu's policies emphasized economics over ideological dogma, an implicit departure from the mass fervor of the Great Leap Forward. Both Liu and Deng supported Mao in the mass campaigns of the 1950s, in which they attacked the bourgeois and capitalists, and promoted Mao's ideology. However, the failure of the Great Leap Forward was seen as an indictment on Mao's ability to manage the economy. Peng Dehuai began openly criticizing Mao, while Liu and Deng maintained a more cautious tone, ultimately taking charge of economic policy as Mao ceased to be involved in the day-to-day affairs of the party and state. Mao agreed to cede the presidency (the de jure head of state position) to Liu, while retaining his leadership positions in the party and army.

Deng Xiaoping during his inspection of the Lanzhou Oil Refinery, April 5, 1957

In 1955, he was considered as a candidate for the PLA rank of Marshal of the People's Republic of China but he was ultimately not awarded the rank.

At the 8th National Congress of the Chinese Communist Party in 1956, Deng supported removing all references to "Mao Zedong Thought" from the party statutes.

In 1963, Deng traveled to Moscow to lead a meeting of the Chinese delegation with Stalin's successor, Nikita Khrushchev. Relations between the People's Republic of China and the Soviet Union had worsened since the death of Stalin. After this meeting, no agreement was reached and the Sino–Soviet split was consummated; there was an almost total suspension of relations between the two major communist powers of the time.

Group photo of Deng Xiaoping and Peng Zhen with the leadership team of Plant 504, a key facility for China's nuclear programme, April 12, 1964

After the "Seven Thousand Cadres Conference" in 1962, Liu and Deng's economic reforms of the early 1960s were generally popular and restored many of the economic institutions previously dismantled during the Great Leap Forward. Mao, sensing his loss of prestige, took action to regain control of the state. Appealing to his revolutionary spirit, Mao launched the Cultural Revolution, which encouraged the masses to root out the right-wing capitalists who had "infiltrated the party". Deng was ridiculed as the "number two capitalist roader".

Deng was one of the primary drafters of the Third Five Year Plan. In draft form, it emphasized a consumer focus and further development in China's more industrialized coastal cities. When Mao argued for a massive campaign to develop basic and national security industry in China's interior as a Third Front in case of invasion by the United States or Soviet Union, Deng was among the key leadership that did not support the idea. Following increased concerns of attack from the United States after the Gulf of Tonkin incident, Deng and other key leadership ultimately supported the Third Front construction, and the focus of the Third Year Plan changed to industrialization of the interior.

=== Purged twice ===
==== Cultural Revolution ====
Mao feared that the reformist economic policies of Deng and Liu could lead to restoration of capitalism and roll back the Chinese Communist Revolution. For this and other reasons, Mao launched the Cultural Revolution in 1966, during which Deng fell out of favor and was forced to retire from all his positions.

During the Cultural Revolution, he and his family were targeted by Red Guards, who imprisoned Deng's eldest son, Deng Pufang. Deng Pufang was tortured and jumped out, or was thrown out, of the window of a four-story building in 1968, becoming a paraplegic. In October 1969 Deng Xiaoping was sent to the Xinjian County Tractor Factory in rural Jiangxi province to work as a regular worker. He operated a lathe. In his four years there, Deng's younger brother Deng Shuping, who served as a government official in Guizhou, committed suicide in 1967 following severe persecution and harassment. Deng spent his spare time writing. He was purged nationally, but to a lesser scale than President Liu Shaoqi.

In 1971, Mao's second official successor and the sole Vice Chairman of the party, Lin Biao, was killed in an air crash. According to official reports, Lin was trying to flee from China after a failed coup against Mao. Mao purged all of Lin's allies, who made up nearly all of the senior ranks of the PLA, leaving Deng (who had been political commissar of the 2nd Field Army during the civil war) the most influential of the remaining army leaders. In the time that followed, Deng wrote to Mao twice to say that he had learned a lesson from the Lin Biao incident, admitted that he had "capitalist trends" and did not "hold high the great banner of Mao Zedong Thought", and expressed the hope that he could work for the Party to make up for his mistakes.

Mao sought Deng to take over for Zhou Enlai, who was seriously ill. On 14 August 1972, Mao wrote that Deng had made serious mistakes, but noted that Deng had been politically attacked for supporting Mao in 1933 and had been loyal. In February 1973, Deng returned to Beijing, after Zhou brought him back from exile in order for Deng to focus on reconstructing the Chinese economy. Zhou was also able to convince Mao to bring Deng back into politics in October 1974 as First Vice-Premier, in practice running daily affairs. He remained careful, however, to avoid contradicting Maoist ideology on paper. In January 1975, he was additionally elected Vice Chairman of the party by the 10th Central Committee for the first time in his party career; Li Desheng had to resign in his favour. Deng was one of five Vice Chairmen, with Zhou being the First Vice Chairman.

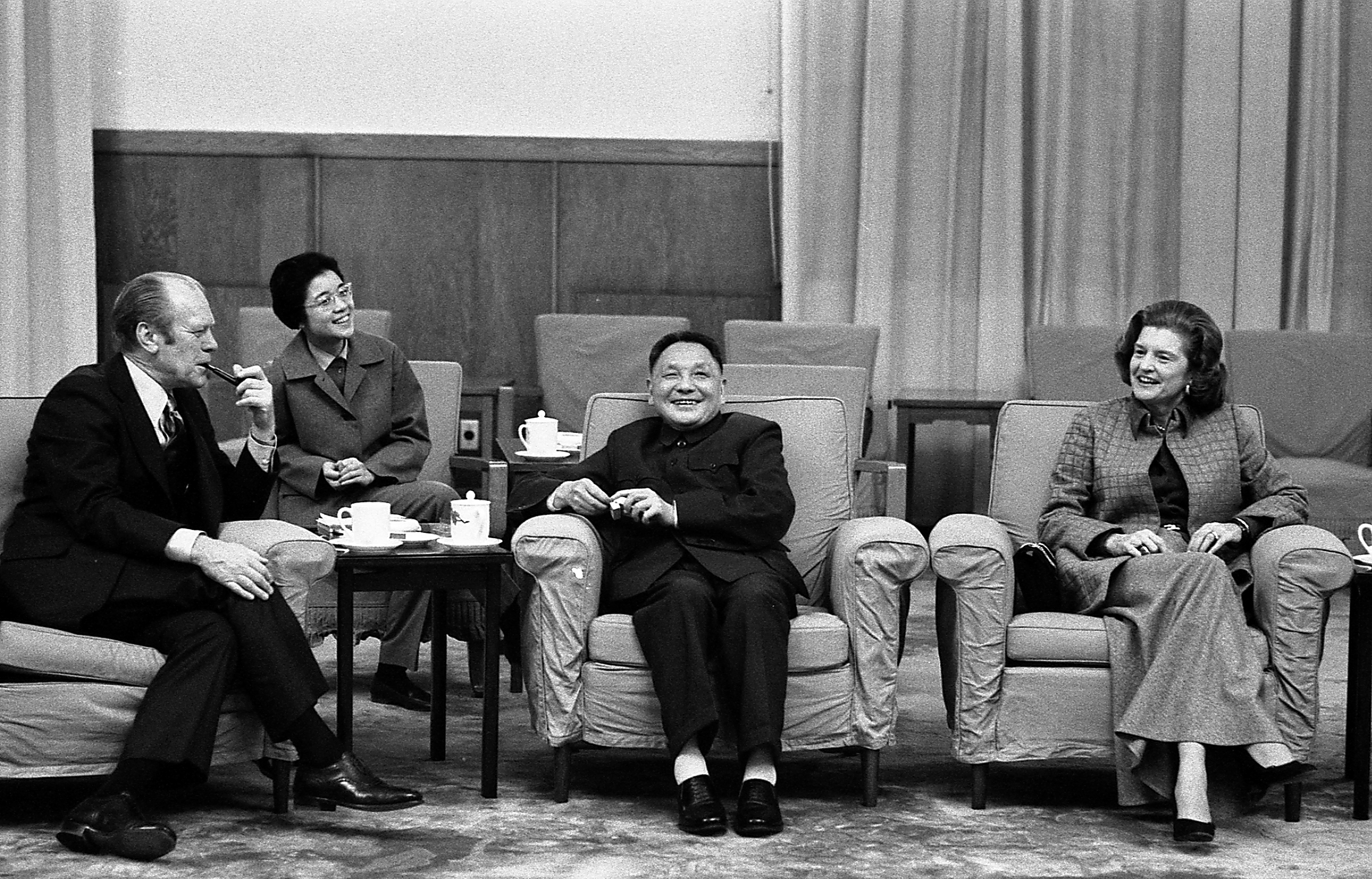
Deng Xiaoping (centre) with U.S. president Gerald Ford (left), 1975

During his brief ascendency in 1973, Deng established the Political Research Office, headed by intellectuals Hu Qiaomu, Yu Guangyuan and Hu Sheng, delegated to explore approaches to political and economic reforms. He led the group himself and managed the project within the State Council, in order to avoid rousing the suspicions of the Gang of Four.

In 1975, Deng sought to re-orient Chinese Academy of Sciences towards more theoretical research, which had not been a focus during the Cultural Revolution. Deng described scientific research in China as lagging behind the needs of socialist construction and the state of the advanced countries, and stated that to catch up, China should emphasize basic science in order to develop a sound theoretical foundation. Although this approach fell out of political favor when Deng was purged, Deng's approach to balancing applied and basic research was adopted as CAS's official policy in June 1977.

The Cultural Revolution was not yet over, and a radical leftist political group known as the Gang of Four, led by Mao's wife Jiang Qing, competed for power within the Party. The Gang saw Deng as their greatest challenge to power. Mao, too, was suspicious that Deng would destroy the positive reputation of the Cultural Revolution, which Mao considered one of his greatest policy initiatives. Beginning in late 1975, Deng was asked to draw up a series of self-criticisms. Although he admitted to having taken an "inappropriate ideological perspective" while dealing with state and party affairs, he was reluctant to admit that his policies were wrong in essence. His antagonism with the Gang of Four became increasingly clear, and Mao seemed to lean in the Gang's favour. Mao refused to accept Deng's self-criticisms and asked the party's Central Committee to "discuss Deng's mistakes thoroughly".

==== "Criticize Deng" campaign ====
Zhou Enlai died in January 1976, to an outpouring of national grief. Zhou was a very important figure in Deng's political life, and his death eroded his remaining support within the Party's Central Committee. After Deng delivered Zhou's official eulogy at the state funeral, the Gang of Four, with Mao's permission, began the "Counterattack the Right-Deviationist Reversal-of-Verdicts Trend" campaign. Hua Guofeng, not Deng, was selected to become Zhou's successor as Premier on 4 February 1976.

On 2 February 1976, the Central Committee issued a Top-Priority Directive, officially transferring Deng to work on "external affairs" and thus removing him from the party's power apparatus. Deng stayed at home for several months, awaiting his fate. The Political Research Office was promptly dissolved, and Deng's advisers such as Yu Guangyuan were suspended. As a result, the political turmoil halted the economic progress Deng had labored for in the past year. On 3 March, Mao issued a directive reaffirming the legitimacy of the Cultural Revolution and specifically pointed to Deng as an internal, rather than external, problem. This was followed by a Central Committee directive issued to all local party organs to study Mao's directive and criticize Deng.

Deng's reputation as a reformer suffered a severe blow when the Qingming Festival, after the mass public mourning of Zhou on a traditional Chinese holiday, culminated in the Tiananmen Incident on 5 April 1976, an event the Gang of Four deemed counter-revolutionary and threatening to their power. Furthermore, the Gang deemed Deng the mastermind behind the incident, and Mao himself wrote that "the nature of things has changed". Deng was removed from all party roles and moved to a house east to Tiananmen Square.

As a result, on 6 April 1976 Premier Hua Guofeng was also appointed to Deng's position as Vice Chairman and at the same time received the vacant position of First Vice Chairman, which Zhou had held, making him Mao's fourth official successor.

== Leadership of China (1978–1989) ==
=== Paramount leader ===
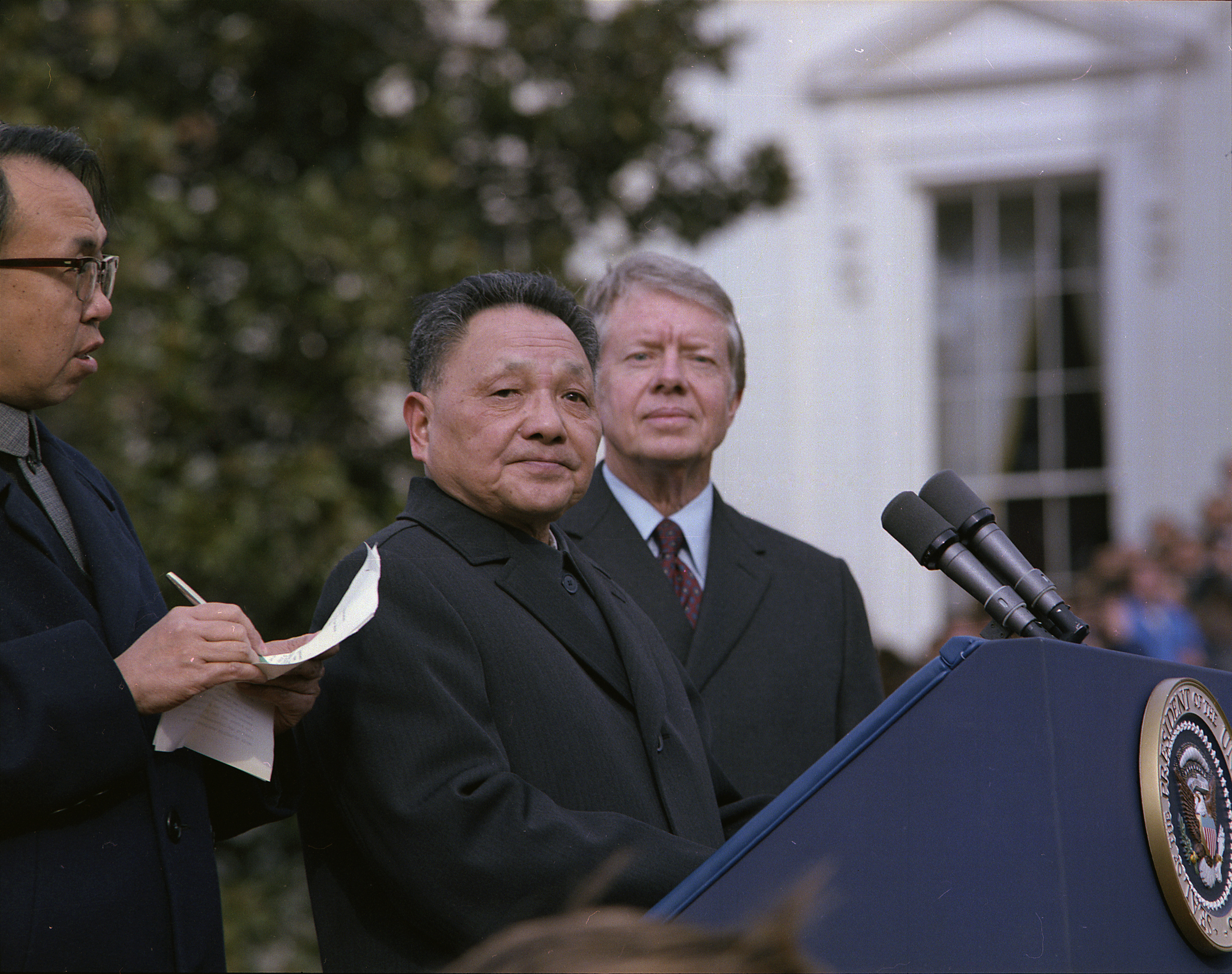
Deng Xiaoping and Jimmy Carter at the arrival ceremony of Deng's visit to the US (1979)

Following Mao's death on 9 September 1976 and the purge of the Gang of Four in October 1976, Premier Hua Guofeng succeeded as Chairman of the Chinese Communist Party and gradually emerged as the de facto leader of China. Prior to Mao's death, the only governmental position Deng held was that of First Vice Premier of the State Council, but Hua Guofeng wanted to rid the Party of extremists and successfully marginalised the Gang of Four. On 22 July 1977, Deng was restored to the posts of vice-chairman of the Central Committee, vice-chairman of the Military Commission and Chief of the General Staff of the People's Liberation Army, making him the third-ranking member in Politburo Standing Committee, after Chairman Hua Guofeng and Ye Jianying.

By carefully mobilizing his supporters within the party, Deng outmaneuvered Hua, who had pardoned him. In February 1980, Deng successfully let his protege Zhao Ziyang to succeed Hua as the Premier of China. Some of Hua's supporters in the Politburo such as Wang Dongxing, Chen Xilian, Wu De and Ji Dengkui resigned at the same time. Later in June 1981, another of Deng's protege Hu Yaobang succeeded Hua to became the Chairman of the central committee, and Deng himself succeeded Hua as the Chairman of the central military committee. In contrast to previous leadership changes, Deng allowed Hua to retain membership in the Central Committee and quietly retire, helping to set the precedent that losing a high-level leadership struggle would not result in physical harm.

During his paramount leadership, his official state positions were Chairman of the Chinese People's Political Consultative Conference from 1978 to 1983 and Chairman of the Central Military Commission (an ad hoc body comprising the most senior members of the party elite) of the People's Republic of China from 1983 to 1990, while his official party positions were Vice Chairman of the Chinese Communist Party from 1977 to 1982, Chairman of the Central Military Commission of the Chinese Communist Party from 1981 to 1989 and Chairman of the Central Advisory Commission from 1982 to 1987. He was offered the rank of General First Class in 1988 when the PLA restored military ranks, but as in 1955, he once again declined. Even after retiring from the Politburo Standing Committee of the Chinese Communist Party in 1987 and the Central Military Commission in 1989, Deng continued to exert influence over China's policies until his death in 1997.

Important decisions were always taken in Deng's home at No. 11 Miliangku Hutong with a caucus of eight senior party cadres, called "Eight Elders", especially with Chen Yun and Li Xiannian. Despite Deng's recognition as paramount leader, in practice these elders governed China as a small collective leadership. Deng ruled as "paramount leader" although he never held the top title of the party, and was able to successively remove three party leaders, including Hu Yaobang. Deng stepped down from the Central Committee and its Politburo Standing Committee. However, he remained as the chairman of the State and Party's Central Military Commission and was still seen as the paramount leader of China rather than General Secretary Zhao Ziyang and Presidents Li Xiannian and Yang Shangkun.

=== Boluan Fanzheng ===
Deng repudiated the Cultural Revolution and, in 1977, launched the "Beijing Spring", which allowed open criticism of the excesses and suffering that had occurred during the period, and restored the National College Entrance Examination (Gao Kao) which had been cancelled for ten years during the Cultural Revolution. Meanwhile, he was the impetus for the abolition of the class background system. Under this system, the CCP removed employment barriers to Chinese deemed to be associated with the former landlord class; its removal allowed a faction favoring the restoration of the private market to enter the Communist Party.

Deng gradually outmaneuvered his political opponents. By encouraging public criticism of the Cultural Revolution, he weakened the position of those who owed their political positions to that event, while strengthening the position of those like himself who had been purged during that time. Deng also received a great deal of popular support. As Deng gradually consolidated control over the CCP, Hua was replaced by Zhao Ziyang as premier in 1980, and by Hu Yaobang as party chairman in 1981, despite the fact that Hua was Mao Zedong's designated successor as the "paramount leader" of the Chinese Communist Party and the People's Republic of China. During the Boluan Fanzheng period, the Cultural Revolution was invalidated, and victims of more than 3 million "unjust, false, wrongful cases" by 1976 were officially rehabilitated.

Deng's elevation to China's new number-one figure meant that the historical and ideological questions around Mao Zedong had to be addressed properly. Because Deng wished to pursue deep reforms, it was not possible for him to continue Mao's hard-line "class struggle" policies and mass public campaigns. In 1981 the Central Committee of the Communist Party released a document entitled Resolution on Certain Questions in the History of Our Party since the Founding of the People's Republic of China. Mao retained his status as a "great Marxist, proletarian revolutionary, militarist, and general", and the undisputed founder and pioneer of the country and the People's Liberation Army. "His accomplishments must be considered before his mistakes", the document declared. Deng privately commented shortly after the publication that Mao was "seven parts good, three parts bad". The document also steered the prime responsibility of the Cultural Revolution away from Mao (although it did state that "Mao mistakenly began the Cultural Revolution") to the "counter-revolutionary cliques" of the Gang of Four and Lin Biao.

=== International affairs ===
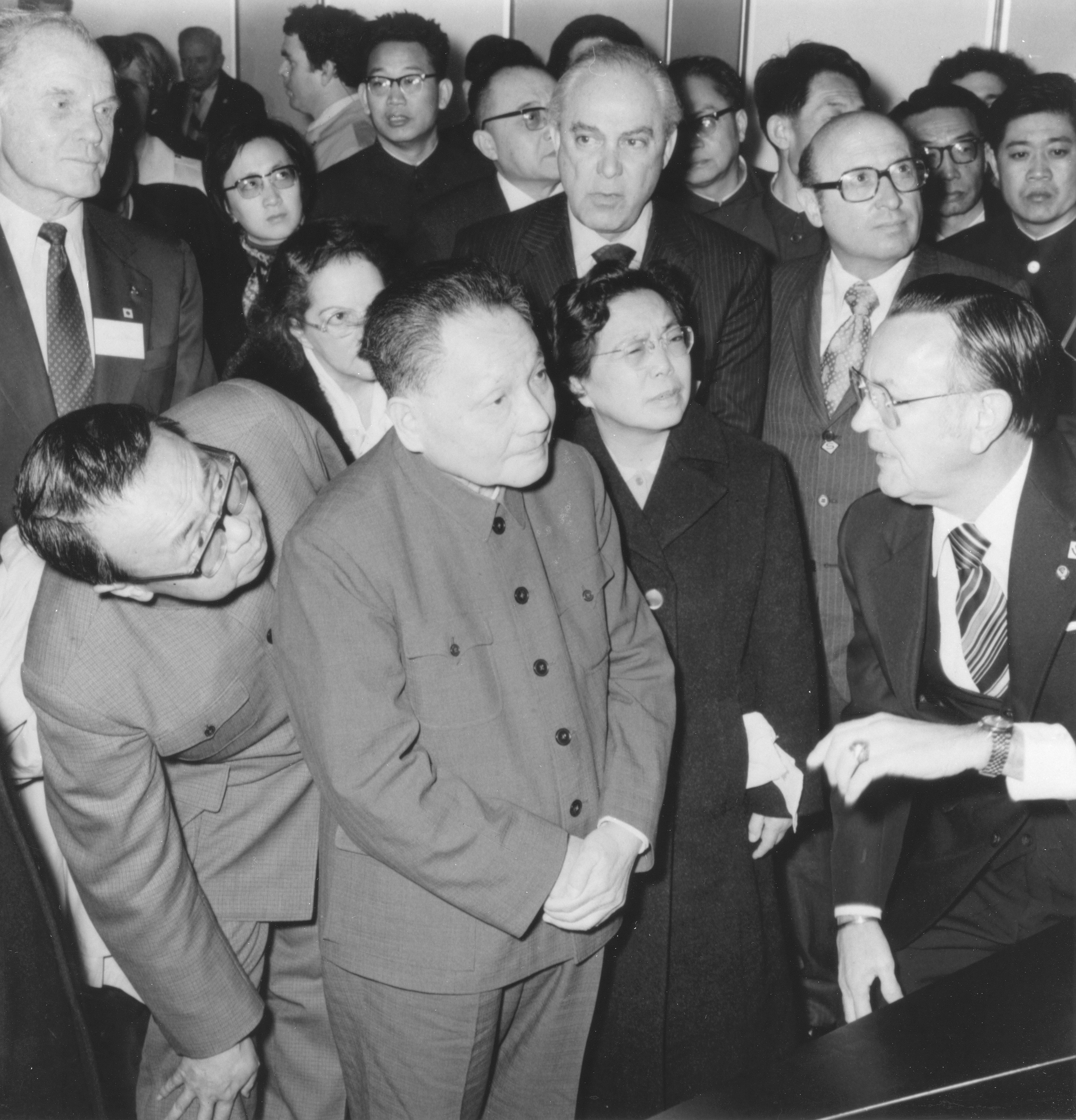
Deng Xiaoping (left) and his wife Zhuo Lin (right) are briefed by Johnson Space Center director Christopher C. Kraft (extreme right)

Deng prioritized China's modernization and opening up to the outside world, stating that China's "strategy in foreign affairs is to seek a peaceful environment" for the Four Modernizations. Under Deng's leadership, China opened up to the outside world, to learn from more advanced countries. Deng developed the principle that in foreign affairs, China should keep a low-profile and bide its time. He continued to seek an independent position between the United States and the Soviet Union. Although Deng retained control over key national security decisions, he also delegated power to bureaucrats in routine matters, ratifying consensus decisions and stepping in if a bureaucratic consensus could not be reached. In contrast to the Mao-era, Deng involved more parties in foreign policy decision-making, decentralizing the foreign policy bureaucracy. This decentralized approach led to consideration of a number of interests and views, but also fragmentation of policy institutions and extensive bargaining between different bureaucratic units during the policy-making process.

In November 1978, after the country had stabilized following political turmoil, Deng visited Bangkok, Kuala Lumpur and Singapore and met with Singapore's Prime Minister Lee Kuan Yew. Deng was very impressed with Singapore's economic development, greenery and housing, and later sent tens of thousands of Chinese to Singapore and countries around the world to learn from their experiences and bring back their knowledge. Lee Kuan Yew, on the other hand, advised Deng to stop exporting Communist ideologies to Southeast Asia, advice that according to Lee, Deng later followed. In late 1978, the aerospace company Boeing announced the sale of 747 aircraft to various airlines in the PRC, and the beverage company Coca-Cola made public their intention to open a production plant in Shanghai.

On 1 January 1979, the United States recognized the People's Republic of China, leaving the (Taiwan) Republic of China's nationalist government to one side, and business contacts between China and the West began to grow.

In early 1979, Deng undertook an official visit to the United States, meeting President Jimmy Carter in Washington as well as several Congressmen. The Chinese insisted that former President Richard Nixon be invited to the formal White House reception, a symbolic indication of their assertiveness on the one hand, and their desire to continue with the Nixon initiatives on the other. As part of the discussions with Carter, Deng sought United States approval for China's contemplated invasion of Vietnam in the Sino-Vietnamese war. According to United States National Security Advisor Zbigniew Brzezinski, Carter reserved judgment, an action which Chinese diplomats interpreted as tacit approval, and China launched the invasion shortly after Deng's return.

During the visit Deng visited American farms and factories, the Johnson Space Center in Houston, as well as the headquarters of Coca-Cola and Boeing in Atlanta and Seattle, respectively. On January 31, 1979, during his visit to the United States, Deng Xiaoping received an honorary Doctor of Laws degree from Temple University at Blair House in Washington, D.C.

He later reported that his close encounters with American industrial and agricultural productivity left him stunned. Deng had recently spent three years as a fitter in a Jiangxi tractor factory during his period of disfavor and he was unable to sleep for several nights, so tantalized was the Premiere by the possibilities that American economic capacity held for Chinese development. The trip to the U.S. radicalized Deng. Upon his return he made it clear that the new Chinese regime's priorities were to be in support of rapid economic and technological development.

Deng took personal charge of the final negotiations with the United States on normalizing foreign relations between the two countries. In response to criticism from within the Party regarding his United States policy, Deng wrote, "I am presiding over the work on the United States. If there are problems, I take full responsibility."

Sino-Japanese relations improved significantly. Deng used Japan as an example of a rapidly progressing power that set a good example for China economically.

Deng described anti-hegemonism as one of China's foreign policy priorities. Deng initially continued to adhere to the Maoist line of the Sino–Soviet split era that the Soviet Union was a superpower as "hegemonic" as the United States, but even more threatening to China because of its close proximity. Relations with the Soviet Union improved after Mikhail Gorbachev took over the Kremlin in 1985, and formal relations between the two countries were finally restored at the 1989 Sino-Soviet Summit.

Deng responded to the Western sanctions following the Tiananmen Square protests by adopting the "twenty-four character guidelines" for China's international affairs: observe carefully (冷静观察), secure China's positions (稳住阵脚), calmly cope with the challenges (沉着应付), hide China's capacities and bide its time (韬光养晦), be good at maintaining a low profile (善于守拙), and never claim leadership (绝不当头).

The end of the Cold War and dissolution of the Soviet Union removed the original motives underlying rapprochement between China and the United States. Deng was motivated by concerns that the United States might curtail support for China's modernization, and adopted a low-profile foreign policy to live with the fact of United States hegemony and focus primarily on domestic development. In this period of its foreign policy, China focused on building good relations with its neighbors and actively participating in multi-lateral institutions. As academic Suisheng Zhao writes in evaluating Deng's foreign policy legacy, "Deng's developmental diplomacy helped create a favorable external environment for China's rise in the twenty-first century. His hand-picked successors, Jiang Zemin and Hu Jintao, faithfully followed his course."

In 1990 when he met Canadian Prime Minister Pierre Trudeau he stated "The key principle governing the new international order should be noninterference in other countries' internal affairs and social systems. It won't work to require all the countries in the world to copy the patterns set by the United States, Britain and France." Deng championed the Five Principles of Peaceful Coexistence stating that they should be used as the "guiding norms of international relations". He emphasized that China should follow the Five Principles of Peaceful Coexistence in managing its foreign relations with countries that were organized according to different political beliefs and social systems.

=== Reform and opening up ===
At the outset of China's reform and opening up, Deng set out the Four Cardinal Principles that had to be maintained in the process: (1) the leadership of the Communist Party, (2) the socialist road, (3) Marxism, and (4) the dictatorship of the proletariat. Overall, reform proceeded gradually, with Deng delegating specific issues to proteges such as Hu Yaobang or Zhao Ziyang, who in turn addressed them under the guiding principle of "seeking truth from facts" – meaning that the correctness of an approach had to be gauged by its economic results. Deng described reform and opening up as a "large scale experiment" requiring thorough "experimentation in practice" instead of textbook knowledge.

In Deng's view, socialism could not be considered superior to capitalism unless it improved the lives of the people in material ways. During Reform and Opening-up, he criticized those he deemed as the ideologies of the Cultural Revolution for seeking "poor socialism" and "poor communism" and believing that communism was a "spiritual thing". In 1979, Deng stated, "Socialism cannot endure if it remains poor. If we want to uphold Marxism and socialism in the international class struggle, we have to demonstrate that the Marxist system of thought is superior to all others, and that the socialist system is superior to capitalism".

The Party's conservative faction, led by fellow party elder and political rival Chen Yun and other powerful veteran communist leaders opposed Deng's reforms and instead supported central planning (modelled after the First Five Year Plan), Stalin-style economic models that preached ideological orthodoxy, fearing that Deng's market-oriented reforms would lead to capitalism and societal instability. Chen and fellow party veteran, Chinese President Li Xiannian advocated for a highly restricted "birdcage economy", free from Western bourgeois ideas.

==== Four modernizations ====
Deng quoted the old proverb "it doesn't matter whether a cat is black or white, if it catches mice it is a good cat", which summarizes his pragmatic "cat theory". The point was that capitalistic methods worked. Deng worked with his team, especially as Zhao Ziyang, who in 1980 replaced Hua Guofeng as premier, and Hu Yaobang, who in 1981 did the same with the post of party chairman. Deng thus took the reins of power and began to emphasize the goals of "four modernizations" (economy, agriculture, scientific and technological development and national defense). He announced an ambitious plan of opening and liberalizing the economy.

The last position of power retained by Hua Guofeng, chairman of the Central Military Commission, was taken by Deng in 1981. However, progress toward military modernization went slowly. A border war with Vietnam in 1977–1979 made major changes unwise. The war puzzled outside observers, but Xiaoming Zhang argues that Deng had multiple goals: stopping Soviet expansion in the region, obtain American support for his four modernizations, and mobilizing China for reform and integration into the world economy. Deng also sought to strengthen his control of the PLA, and demonstrate to the world that China was capable of fighting a real war. Zhang thinks punishment of Vietnam for its invasion of Cambodia was a minor factor. In the event, the Chinese forces did poorly, in terms of equipment, strategy, leadership, and battlefield performance. Deng subsequently used the PLA's poor performance to overcome resistance by military leaders to his military reforms.

Prior to its dissolution in 1991, China believed the Soviet Union was its primary military threat, which was much more powerful despite having fewer soldiers, owing to its more advanced weapons technology. In March 1981, Deng deemed a military exercise necessary for the PLA, and in September, the North China Military Exercise took place, becoming the largest exercise conducted by the PLA since the founding of the People's Republic. Moreover, Deng initiated the modernization of the PLA and decided that China first had to develop an advanced civilian scientific infrastructure before it could hope to build modern weapons. He therefore concentrated on downsizing the military, cutting 1 million troops in 1985 (百万大裁军), retiring the elderly and corrupt senior officers and their cronies. He emphasized the recruitment of much better educated young men who would be able to handle the advanced technology when it finally arrived. Instead of patronage and corruption in the officer corps, he imposed strict discipline in all ranks. In 1982 he established a new Commission for Science, Technology, and Industry for National Defense to plan for using technology developed in the civilian sector.

==== Three steps to economic development ====
In 1986, Deng explained to Mike Wallace on 60 Minutes that some people and regions could become prosperous first in order to bring about common prosperity faster. In October 1987, at the Plenary Session of the National People's Congress, Deng was re-elected as Chairman of the Central Military Commission, but he resigned as Chairman of the Central Advisory Commission and was succeeded by Chen Yun. Deng continued to chair and develop the reform and opening up as the main policy, and he advanced the three steps suitable for China's economic development strategy within seventy years: the first step, to double the 1980 GNP and ensure that the people have enough food and clothing, was attained by the end of the 1980s; the second step, to quadruple the 1980 GNP by the end of the 20th century, was achieved in 1995 ahead of schedule; the third step, to increase per capita GNP to the level of the medium-developed countries by 2050, at which point, the Chinese people will be fairly well-off and modernization will be basically realized.

==== Further reforms ====
Improving relations with the outside world was the second of two important philosophical shifts outlined in Deng's program of reform termed "Reform and opening up". China's domestic social, political, and most notably, economic systems would undergo significant changes during Deng's time. The goals of Deng's reforms were summed up by the Four Modernizations, those of agriculture, industry, science and technology, and the military.

The strategy for achieving these aims of becoming a modern, industrial nation was the socialist market economy. Deng argued that China was in the primary stage of socialism and that the duty of the party was to perfect so-called "socialism with Chinese characteristics", and "seek truth from facts". (This somewhat resembles the Leninist theoretical justification of the New Economic Policy (NEP) in the 1920s, which argued that the Soviet Union had not gone deeply enough into the capitalist phase and therefore needed limited capitalism in order to fully evolve its means of production.) The "socialism with Chinese characteristics" settles a benign structure for the implementation of ethnic policy and forming a unique method of ethnic theory.

Deng's economic policy prioritized developing China's productive forces. In Deng's view, this development "is the most fundamental revolution from the viewpoint of historical development[,]" and "[p]oor socialism" is not socialism. His theoretical justification for allowing market forces was:

The proportion of planning to market forces is not the essential difference between socialism and capitalism. A planned economy is not equivalent to socialism, because there is planning under capitalism too; a market economy is not capitalism, because there are markets under socialism too. Planning and market forces are both means of controlling economic activity. The essence of socialism is liberation and development of the productive forces, elimination of exploitation and polarisation, and the ultimate achievement of prosperity for all. This concept must be made clear to the people.

Unlike Hua Guofeng, Deng believed that no policy should be rejected outright simply because it was not associated with Mao. Unlike more conservative leaders such as Chen Yun, Deng did not immediately object to policies on the grounds that they were similar to ones that were found in capitalist nations.

This political flexibility towards the foundations of socialism is strongly supported by quotes such as:

We mustn't fear to adopt the advanced management methods applied in capitalist countries ... The very essence of socialism is the liberation and development of the productive systems ... Socialism and market economy are not incompatible ... We should be concerned about right-wing deviations, but most of all, we must be concerned about left-wing deviations.

Although Deng provided the theoretical background and the political support to allow reform and opening up to occur, the general consensus amongst historians is that few of the economic reforms that Deng introduced were originated by Deng himself. Premier Zhou Enlai, for example, pioneered the Four Modernizations years before Deng. In addition, many reforms would be introduced by local leaders, often not sanctioned by central government directives. If successful and promising, these reforms would be adopted by larger and larger areas and ultimately introduced nationally. An often cited example is the household responsibility system, which was first secretly implemented by a poor rural village at the risk of being convicted as "counter-revolutionary". This experiment proved very successful. Deng openly supported it and it was later adopted nationally. Many other reforms were influenced by the experiences of the East Asian Tigers.

This was in sharp contrast to the pattern of perestroika undertaken by Mikhail Gorbachev, in which most major reforms originated with Gorbachev himself. The bottom-up approach of Deng's reforms, in contrast to the top-down approach of perestroika, was likely a key factor in the success of the former.

Deng's reforms actually included the introduction of planned, centralized management of the macro-economy by technically proficient bureaucrats, abandoning Mao's mass campaign style of economic construction. However, unlike the Soviet model, management was indirect through market mechanisms. Deng sustained Mao's legacy to the extent that he stressed the primacy of agricultural output and encouraged a significant decentralization of decision making in the rural economy teams and individual peasant households. At the local level, material incentives, rather than political appeals, were to be used to motivate the labor force, including allowing peasants to earn extra income by selling the produce of their private plots at free market value.

Under Deng Xiaoping's leadership, the Cultural Revolution-era trend towards localizing authority over state-owned enterprises was reversed, and SOE management was again centralized.

In alignment with Deng's pragmatism, he praised and substantially improved the reputation of Qing official Qishan, who was formerly criticised for his pragmatic approach against the British in the First Opium War.

==== Export focus ====
In the move toward market allocation, local municipalities and provinces were allowed to invest in industries that they considered most profitable, which encouraged investment in light manufacturing. Thus, Deng's reforms shifted China's development strategy to an emphasis on light industry and export-led growth. Light industrial output was vital for a developing country coming from a low capital base. With the short gestation period, low capital requirements, and high foreign-exchange export earnings, revenues generated by light manufacturing were able to be reinvested in technologically more advanced production and further capital expenditures and investments.

However, in sharp contrast to the similar, but much less successful reforms in the Socialist Federal Republic of Yugoslavia and the People's Republic of Hungary, these investments were not government mandated. The capital invested in heavy industry largely came from the banking system, and most of that capital came from consumer deposits. One of the first items of the Deng reforms was to prevent reallocation of profits except through taxation or through the banking system; hence, the reallocation in state-owned industries was somewhat indirect, thus making them more or less independent from government interference. In short, Deng's reforms sparked an industrial revolution in China.

These reforms were a reversal of the Maoist policy of economic self-reliance. China decided to accelerate the modernization process by stepping up the volume of foreign trade, especially the purchase of machinery from Japan and the West. In October 1978, to exchange the instruments of ratification for the "Treaty of Peace and Friendship between Japan and the People's Republic of China", Deng Xiaoping visited Japan for the first time and was warmly received by Prime Minister Takeo Fukuda and others. Deng Xiaoping was only Vice Premier during the time of his meetings with Japanese officials, but the Japanese government received Deng as the effective paramount leader of China due to his long history with the CCP, nonetheless. Deng was deemed the first Chinese leader to receive an audience in addition to Japanese Emperor Showa. A news article from NHK Japan in 1978 reported that Deng diplomatically stated "we talked about our past, but His Majesty's focus on building a better future is something I noticed." Deng's statement suggests the new era of China's political reform through foreign economic diplomacy.

The Treaty of Peace and Friendship between Japan and the People's Republic of China is an ongoing pact between the two nations to this day. Article 1 of the treaty describes mutual respect for sovereignty and territorial integrity, mutual non-aggression, and mutual non-interference in internal affairs. Article 2 proclaims anti-hegemony. Article 3 discusses the further development of economic and cultural relations between the two countries, and Article 4 addresses the relationship of this treaty with third countries. Although it took six years from the restoration of diplomatic relations for the peace treaty negotiations to be concluded as the "anti-hegemony" clause and the "third country" clause were considered the most contentious, the agreement still informs much of contemporary Sino-Japanese relations. By participating in such export-led growth, China was able to step up the Four Modernizations by attaining certain foreign funds, market, advanced technologies and management experiences, thus accelerating its economic development. From 1980, Deng attracted foreign companies to a series of Special Economic Zones, where foreign investment and market liberalization were encouraged.

The reforms sought to improve labor productivity. New material incentives and bonus systems were introduced. Rural markets selling peasants' homegrown products and the surplus products of communes were revived. Not only did rural markets increase agricultural output, they stimulated industrial development as well. With peasants able to sell surplus agricultural yields on the open market, domestic consumption stimulated industrialization as well and also created political support for more difficult economic reforms.

There are some parallels between Deng's market socialism especially in the early stages, and Vladimir Lenin's NEP as well as those of Nikolai Bukharin's economic policies, in that both foresaw a role for private entrepreneurs and markets based on trade and pricing rather than central planning. As academics Christopher Marquis and Kunyuan Qiao observe, Deng had been present in the Soviet Union when Lenin implemented the NEP, and it is reasonable to infer that it may have impacted Deng's view that markets could exist within socialism. In first meeting between Deng and Armand Hammer, Deng pressed the industrialist and former investor in Lenin's Soviet Union for as much information on the new economic policy as possible.

==== Stepping back from the front ====
By 13th Party Congress in 1987, Deng is trying to push the party elders to step back and elevate more younger officials to held important roles. After the 13th Party Congress, Deng himself alongside with Chen Yun, Li Xiannian all left the central committee and Politburo Standing Committee. Other elders such as Peng Zhen and Deng Yingchao fully retired from politics. However, Deng still maintained his position as Chairman of the central military committee.

=== Return of Hong Kong and Macau ===
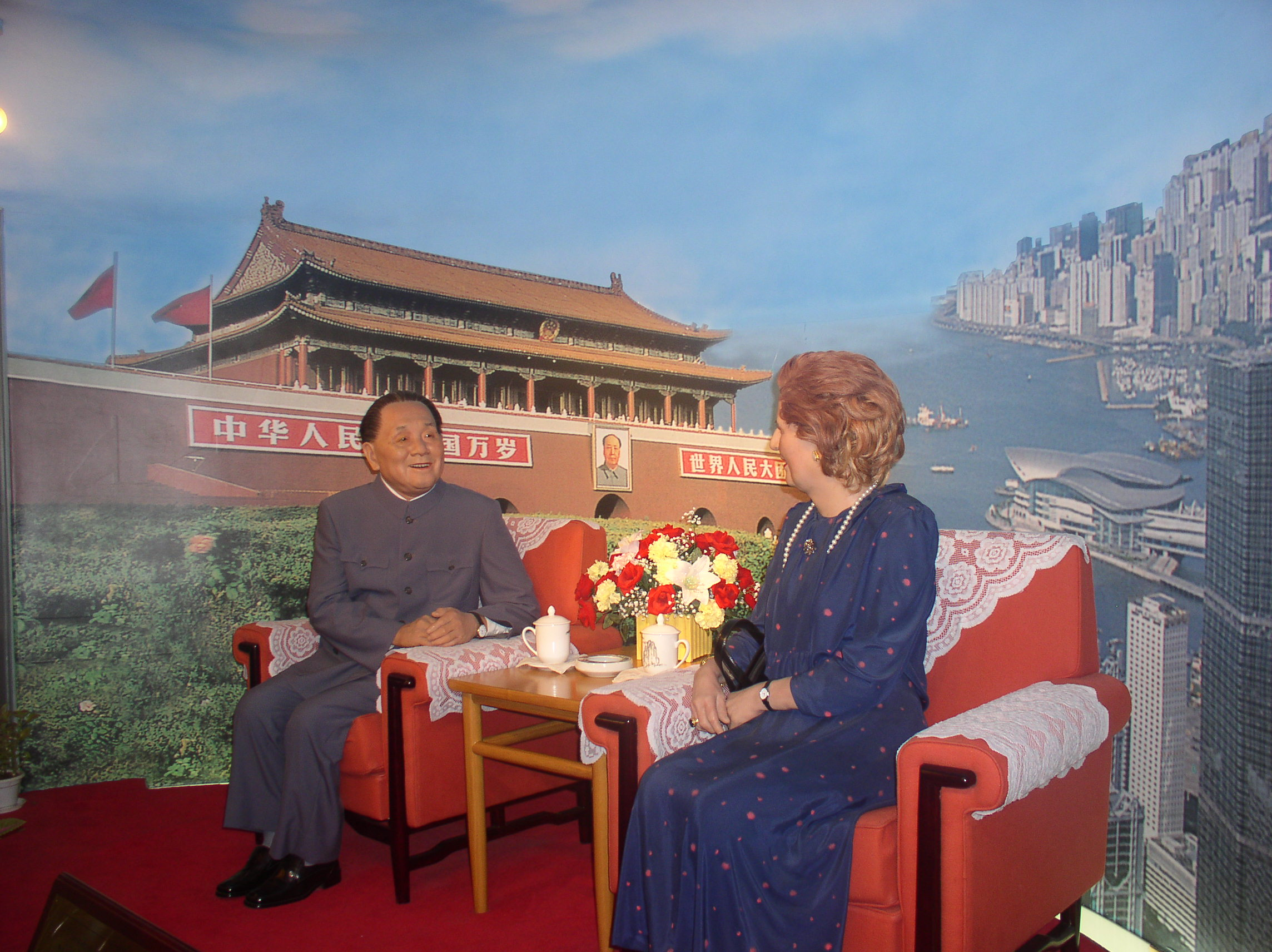
A model reconstruction of Deng Xiaoping's 1984 meeting with British Prime Minister Margaret Thatcher, Shenzhen

From 1980 onwards, Deng led the expansion of the economy, and in political terms took over negotiations with the United Kingdom to return Hong Kong, meeting personally with then-Prime Minister Margaret Thatcher. Thatcher had participated in the meetings with the hopes of keeping British rule over Hong Kong Island and Kowloon – two of the three constituent territories of the colony – but this was firmly rejected by Deng. The result of these negotiations was the Sino-British Joint Declaration, signed on 19 December 1984, which formally outlined the United Kingdom's return of the whole Hong Kong colony to China by 1997. The Chinese government pledged to respect the economic system and civil liberties of the British colony for fifty years after the handover.

Deng's theory of one country, two systems applied to Hong Kong and Macau and Deng intended to also present it as an attractive option to the people of Taiwan for eventual incorporation of that island, where sovereignty over the territory is still disputed. In 1982, Deng first explained the concept of one country, two systems in relation to Taiwan.

Deng's statements during the 1987 drafting of the Basic Law of Hong Kong showed his view of the principle in the Hong Kong context. At that time, Deng stated that the central government would not intervene in the daily business of Hong Kong, but predicted Hong Kong would sometimes have issues affecting national interests that would require the central government's involvement. Deng said, "after 1997, we shall still allow people in Hong Kong to attack the Communist Party of China and China verbally, but what if the words were turned into action, trying to convert Hong Kong into a base of opposition to the Chinese mainland under the pretext of 'democracy'? Then there's no choice but intervention." In June 1988, Deng stated that "Hong Kong's political system today is neither the British system nor the American system, and it should not transplant the Western ways in the future."

=== Population control and crime control ===
China's rapid economic growth presented several problems. The 1982 census revealed the extraordinary growth of the population, which already exceeded a billion people. Deng continued the plans initiated by Hua Guofeng to restrict birth to only one child, limiting women to one child under pain of administrative penalty. The policy applied to urban areas, and included forced abortions.

In August 1983, Deng launched the "Strike hard" Anti-crime Campaign due to the worsening public safety after the Cultural Revolution. Estimates have placed the number at 24,000 who were sentenced to death (mostly in the first "battle" of the campaign). A number of people arrested (some even received death penalty) were children or relatives of government officials at various levels, including the grandson of Zhu De, demonstrating the principle of "all are equal before the law". The campaign had an immediate positive effect on public safety, while controversies also arose such as whether some of the legal punishments were too harsh and whether the campaign had long-term positive effect on public safety.

=== Crackdown on dissent ===
Increasing economic freedom was being translated into a greater freedom of opinion, and critics began to arise within the system, including the famous dissident Wei Jingsheng, who coined the term "fifth modernization" in reference to democracy as a missing element in the renewal plans of Deng Xiaoping. Wei was later arrested and convicted of "counter-revolutionary" activities. In the late 1980s, dissatisfaction with the authoritarian regime and growing inequalities and corruption caused the biggest crisis to Deng's leadership, the prelude being the 1986 Chinese student demonstrations, which led to his protégé General Secretary Hu Yaobang's political downfall.

=== Crackdown of Tiananmen Square protests ===
The 1989 Tiananmen Square protests, culminating in the June Fourth Massacre, were a series of demonstrations in and near Tiananmen Square in the People's Republic of China between 15 April and 5 June 1989, a year in which many other communist governments collapsed.

The protests were sparked by the death of Hu Yaobang, a reformist official backed by Deng but ousted by the Eight Elders and the conservative wing of the politburo. Many people were dissatisfied with the party's slow response and relatively subdued funeral arrangements. Public mourning began on the streets of Beijing and universities in the surrounding areas. In Beijing, this was centered on the Monument to the People's Heroes in Tiananmen Square. The mourning became a public conduit for anger against perceived nepotism in the government, the unfair dismissal and early death of Hu, and the behind-the-scenes role of the "old men". By the eve of Hu's funeral, the demonstration had reached 100,000 people on Tiananmen Square. While the protests lacked a unified cause or leadership, participants raised the issue of corruption within the government and some voiced calls for economic liberalization and democratic reform within the structure of the government while others called for a less authoritarian and less centralized form of socialism.

During the demonstrations, Deng's pro-market ally General Secretary Zhao Ziyang supported the demonstrators and distanced himself from the Politburo. Martial law was declared on 20 May by the socialist hardliner, Chinese premier Li Peng, but the initial military advance on the city was blocked by residents. The movement lasted seven weeks. On 3–4 June, over two hundred thousand soldiers in tanks and helicopters were sent into the city to quell the protests by force, resulting in hundreds to thousands of casualties. Many ordinary people in Beijing believed that Deng had ordered the intervention, but political analysts do not know who was actually behind the order. However, Deng's daughter defends the actions that occurred as a collective decision by the party leadership.

To purge sympathizers of Tiananmen demonstrators, the Communist Party initiated a one-and-a-half-year-long program similar to the Anti-Rightist Movement. Old-timers like Deng Fei aimed to deal "strictly with those inside the party with serious tendencies toward bourgeois liberalization", and more than 30,000 communist officers were deployed to the task.

Zhao was placed under house arrest by hardliners and Deng himself was forced to make concessions to them. He soon declared that "the entire imperialist Western world plans to make all socialist countries discard the socialist road and then bring them under the monopoly of international capital and onto the capitalist road". A few months later he said that the "United States was too deeply involved" in the student movement, referring to foreign reporters who had given financial aid to the student leaders and later helped them escape to various Western countries, primarily the United States through Hong Kong and Taiwan.

Although Deng initially made concessions to the socialist hardliners, he soon resumed his reforms after his 1992 southern tour. After his tour, he was able to stop the attacks of the socialist hardliners on the reforms through their "named capitalist or socialist?" campaign. Deng privately told former Canadian Prime Minister Pierre Trudeau that factions of the Communist Party could have grabbed army units and the country had risked a civil war. Two years later, Deng endorsed Zhu Rongji, a Shanghai Mayor, as a vice-premier candidate. Zhu Rongji had refused to declare martial law in Shanghai during the demonstrations even though socialist hardliners had pressured him.

== Resignation and 1992 southern tour ==
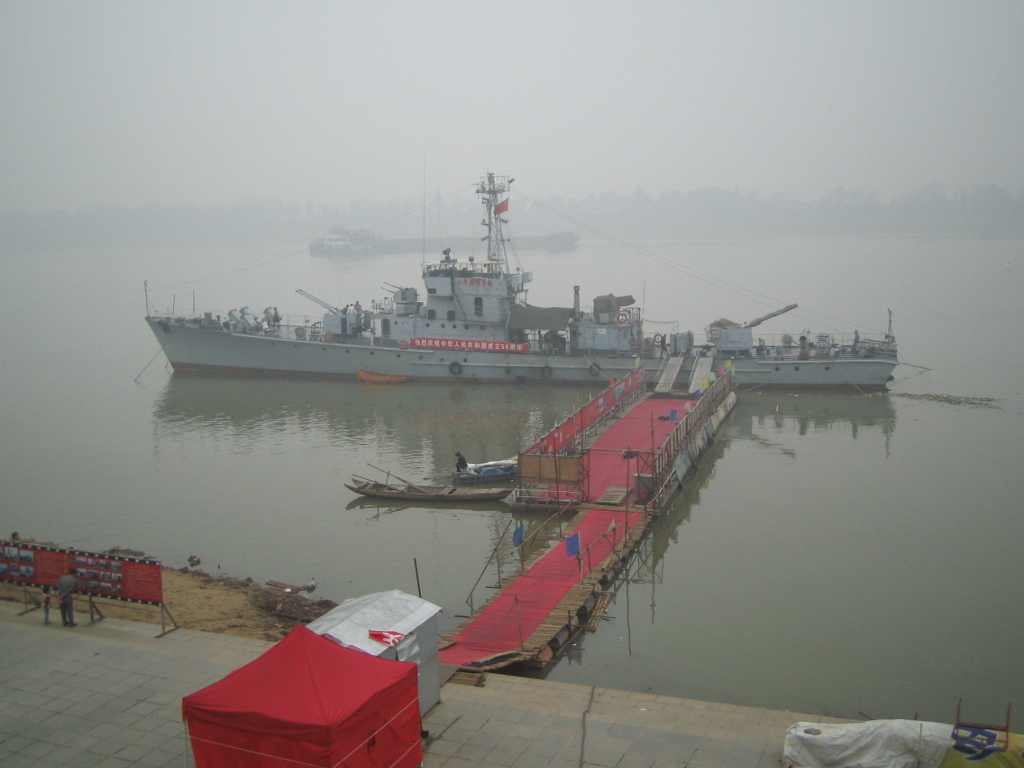
A patrol boat that was used on Deng Xiaoping's southern tour

Officially, Deng decided to retire from top positions when he stepped down as Chairman of the Central Military Commission in November 1989 and his successor Jiang Zemin became the new Chairman of the Central Military Commission and paramount leader. China, however, was still in the era of Deng Xiaoping. He continued to be widely regarded as the de facto leader of the country, believed to have backroom control despite no official position apart from being chairman of the Chinese Contract Bridge Association, and appointed Hu Jintao as Jiang's successor at the 14th Party Congress in 1992.

Because of the 1989 Tiananmen Square protests, Deng's power had been significantly weakened and there was a growing formalist faction opposed to Deng's reforms within the Communist Party. To reassert his economic agenda, in the spring of 1992, Deng made a tour of southern China, visiting Guangzhou, Shenzhen, Zhuhai and spending the New Year in Shanghai, using his travels as a method of reasserting his economic policy after his retirement from office. He said "Some people slander our socialist system as the Qin system, which is vexatious! Our system is not totalitarian, but democratic centralism. During the period of Chairman Mao, it was not the Qin system, but also democratic centralism. I would say that it is more like the system of France." The 1992 Southern Tour is widely regarded as a critical point in the modern history of China, as it saved the reform and opening up and preserved the stability of the society.

By the 14th Party Congress in October 1992, Deng and the reform faction had more influence than the conservative faction. After the 14th Party Congress, conservative Politburo Standing Committee members Yao Yilin and Song Ping both retired. Instead, Deng placed reformist Zhu Rongji into the Politburo Standing Committee. Deng also successfully abolished the Central Advisory Committee, which has become the base of conservative faction within the party by early 1990s. Following the abolition of Central Advisory Committee in October 1992, all party elders including Chen Yun, Bo Yibo and Song Renqiong were all fully retired from politics.

Deng made his last public appearance on 31 October 1993, as he took the subway to visit several places in Beijing. He also made his last trip to Shanghai during Chinese New Year in February 1994, where he met with Shanghai party secretary Wu Bangguo and mayor Huang Ju. Deng's health deteriorated drastically in late 1994. In January 1995, Deng's daughter told the press that "A year ago, he could walk for 30 minutes twice a day, but now he cannot walk … He needs two people to support him." It was also reported that Parkinson's experts were sent to Beijing to help him in 1995. Deng generally preferred not to directly speak of dying, instead describing himself as "going to see the Premier", meaning Zhou Enlai. Deng was hospitalized on 12 December 1996 due to respiratory disease.

== Death ==
Deng Xiaoping's ashes lie in state in Beijing whose banner reads "Memorial Service of Comrade Deng Xiaoping", February 1997

Deng died on 19 February 1997 at 9:08 p.m. Beijing time, aged 92 from a lung infection and Parkinson's disease. The public was largely prepared for his death, as there had been rumors that his health was deteriorating. At 10:00 on the morning of 24 February, people were asked by Premier Li Peng to pause in silence for three minutes. The nation's flags flew at half-mast for over a week.

Deng's official obituary instructed Chinese people to study Deng Xiaoping's method of building socialism with Chinese characteristics. It praised his "scientific attitude and creative spirit in applying a Marxist stand" and his "viewpoints and methods to studying new problems and solving new problems". It also praised his 1992 southern tour.

The nationally televised funeral, which was a simple and relatively private affair attended by the country's leaders and Deng's family, was broadcast on all cable channels. After the funeral, his organs were donated to medical research. The remains were cremated at Babaoshan Revolutionary Cemetery and his ashes were subsequently scattered at sea from an airplane by his wife, Zhuo Lin. For the next two weeks, Chinese state media ran news stories and documentaries related to Deng's life and death, with the regular 19:00 National News program in the evening lasting almost two hours over the regular broadcast time.

Deng's successor, Jiang Zemin, maintained Deng's political and economic philosophies. Deng was eulogized as a "great Marxist, great Proletarian Revolutionary, statesman, military strategist, and diplomat; one of the main leaders of the Chinese Communist Party, the People's Liberation Army of China, and the People's Republic of China; the great architect of China's socialist opening-up and modernized construction; the founder of Deng Xiaoping Theory". Some elements, notably modern Maoists and radical reformers (the far left and the far right), had negative views, however.

Deng's death drew international reaction. UN Secretary-General Kofi Annan said Deng was to be remembered "in the international community at large as a primary architect of China's modernization and dramatic economic development". French President Jacques Chirac said "In the course of this century, few men have, as much as Deng, led a vast human community through such profound and determining changes"; British Prime Minister John Major commented about Deng's key role in the return of Hong Kong to Chinese control; Canadian Prime Minister Jean Chrétien called Deng a "pivotal figure" in Chinese history. The Kuomintang chair in Taiwan also sent its condolences, saying it longed for peace, cooperation, and prosperity. The Dalai Lama voiced regret that Deng died without resolving questions over Tibet.

The song Story of Spring, by Dong Wenhua, celebrates Deng's achievements. It was first performed during a television gala in 1994.

== Legacy ==
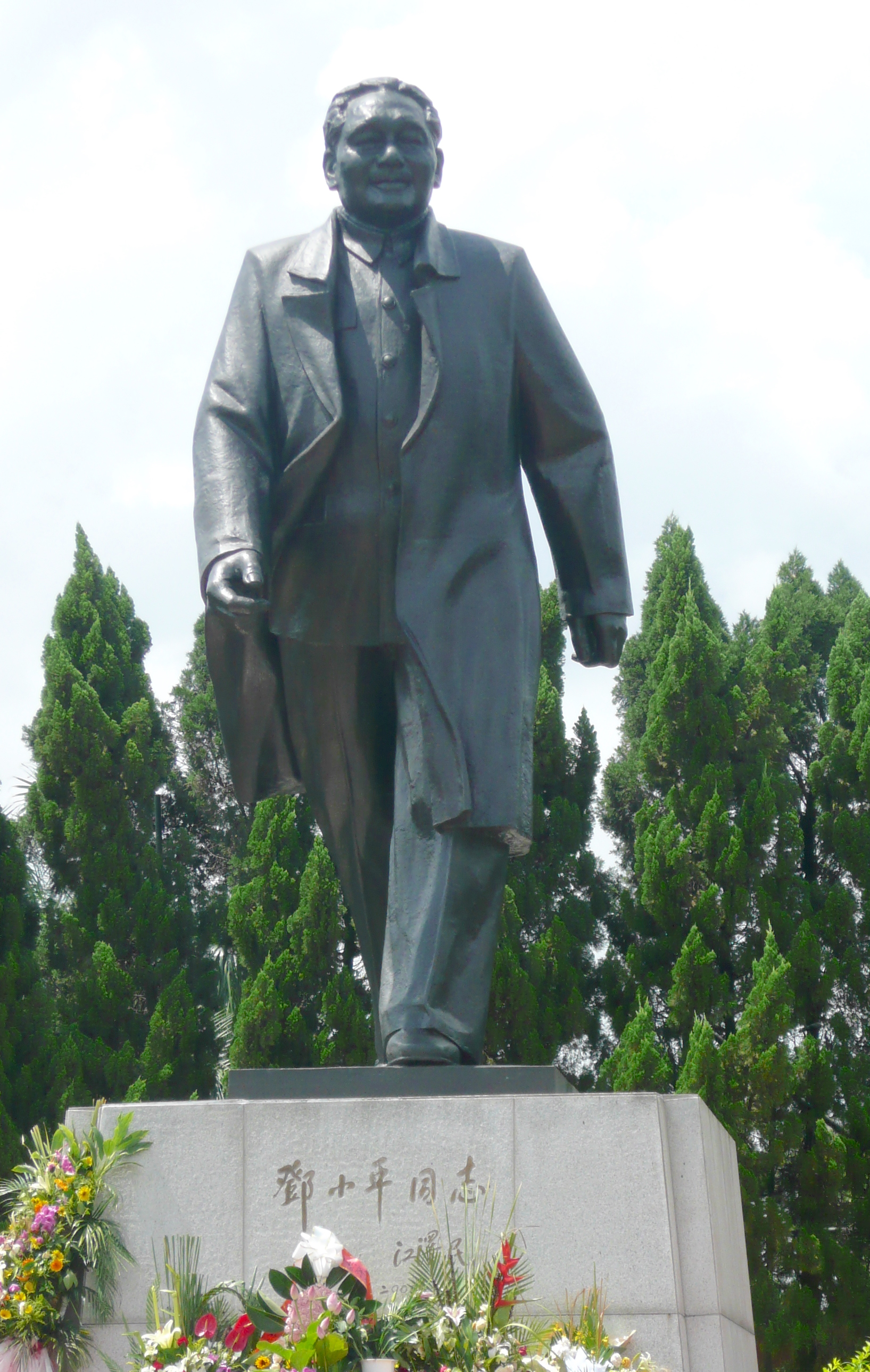
Statue of Deng Xiaoping in Shenzhen

Deng was recognized officially as "the chief architect (总设计师) of the reform and opening up and China's socialist modernization". To the Communist Party, he was believed to have set a good example for communist cadres who refused to retire at old age. He broke earlier conventions of holding offices for life. He was often referred to as simply Comrade Xiaoping, with no title attached.

Deng's view that "development is the absolute principle" continues to shape the Chinese approach to governance. At the Fourth Plenary Session of the 13th Central Committee, Jiang Zemin and the third generation of leaders stated, "Development is the Party's top priority in governing and rejuvenating the country." Likewise, Deng's emphasis on development as the absolute principle also shaped Hu Jintao's Scientific Outlook on Development and Xi Jinping's Chinese Dream, which emphasizes development as China's core task.

=== Memorials ===
Memorials to Deng have been low profile compared to other leaders, in keeping with Deng's image of pragmatism. Rather than being embalmed, as was Mao, he was cremated and his ashes were scattered at sea. There are some public displays, however. A bronze statue was erected on 14 November 2000, at the grand plaza of Lianhua Mountain Park in Shenzhen. This statue is dedicated to Deng's role as a planner and contributor to the development of the Shenzhen Special Economic Zone. The statue is 6 metres (20 ft) high, with an additional 3.68-meter base, and shows Deng striding forward confidently. Many CCP high level leaders visit the statue. In addition, in coastal areas and on the island province of Hainan, Deng appeared on roadside billboards with messages emphasizing the reform and opening up or his policy of one country, two systems.

A bronze statue to commemorate Deng's 100th birthday was dedicated 13 August 2004 in the city of Guang'an, Deng's hometown, in southwest China's Sichuan. Deng is dressed casually, sitting on a chair and smiling. The Chinese characters on the pedestal were written by Jiang Zemin, then General Secretary of the Chinese Communist Party and Chairman of the Central Military Commission.

Deng Xiaoping's Former Residence in his hometown of Paifang Village in Sichuan has been preserved as an historical museum.

In Bishkek, capital of Kyrgyzstan, there is a six-lane boulevard, 25 metres (82 ft) wide and 3.5 kilometres (2 mi) long, the Deng Xiaoping Prospekt, which was dedicated on 18 June 1997. A two-meter high red granite monument stands at the east end of this route. The epigraph is written in Chinese, Russian and Kyrgyz.

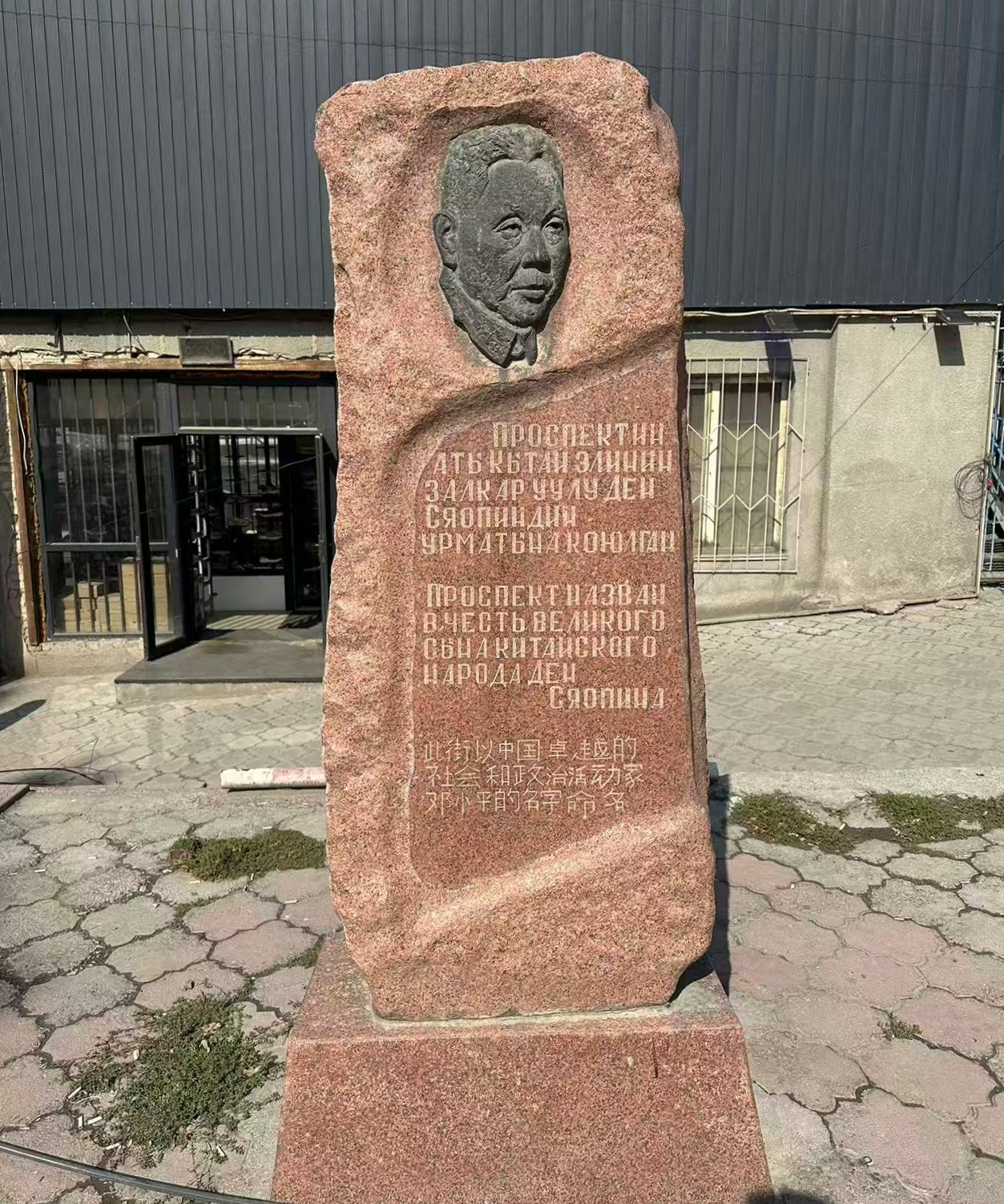
The monument dedicated to Deng Xiaoping in Bishkek, Kyrgyzstan

The documentary, Deng Xiaoping, released by CCTV in January 1997, presents his life from his days as a student in France to his "Southern Tour" of 1993. In 2014, CCTV released a TV series, Deng Xiaoping at History's Crossroads, in anticipation of the 110th anniversary of his birth.

=== Assessment ===
Deng has been called the "architect of contemporary China" and is widely considered to have been one of the most influential figures of the 20th century. He was the Time Person of the Year in 1978 and 1985, the third Chinese leader (after Chiang Kai-shek and his wife Soong Mei-ling) and the fourth time for a communist leader (after Joseph Stalin, picked twice; and Nikita Khrushchev) to be selected.

Deng is remembered primarily for the reform and opening up he initiated while paramount leader of the People's Republic of China, which pivoted China towards a market economy, led to high economic growth, increased standards of living of hundreds of millions, expanded personal and cultural freedoms, and substantially integrated the country into the world economy. More people were lifted out of poverty during his leadership than during any other time in human history, attributed largely to his reforms. For this reason, some have suggested that Deng should have been awarded the Nobel Peace Prize. Deng is also credited with reducing the cult of Mao Zedong and with bringing an end to the chaotic era of the Cultural Revolution. Furthermore, his strong-handed tactics have been credited with keeping the People's Republic of China unified, in contrast to the other major Communist power of the time, the Soviet Union, which collapsed in 1991.

However, Deng is also remembered for human rights violations and for numerous instances of political violence. As paramount leader, he oversaw the Tiananmen Square massacre; afterwards, he was influential in the Communist Party's domestic cover-up of the event. Furthermore, he is associated with some of the worst purges during Mao Zedong's rule; for instance, he ordered an army crackdown on a Muslim village in Yunnan which resulted in the deaths of 1,600 people, including 300 children.

Moreover, Deng Xiaoping's economic reforms initiated the path toward a market economy which ultimately led to the conditions for the accelerating privatization and restructuring of state-owned enterprises (SOEs) in the mid-to-late 1990s. This period, carried out by his successors who were acting on the momentum of his policies, involved a much more aggressive and systemic dismantling of the inefficient state-owned sector, which resulted in massive layoffs collectively known as Xiagang (下岗: step down from the post) as the state reneged on its promises of permanent employment and welfare benefits. While these reforms improved enterprise efficiency, they also culminated in the significant deterioration of labor rights and rising inequality in the subsequent decades.

As paramount leader, Deng also negotiated an end to the British colonial rule of Hong Kong and normalized relations with the United States and the Soviet Union. In August 1980, he started China's political reforms by setting term limits for officials and proposing a systematic revision of China's third Constitution which was made during the Cultural Revolution; the new Constitution embodied Chinese-style constitutionalism and was passed by the National People's Congress in December 1982, with most of its content still being effective as of today. He helped establish China's nine-year compulsory education, and revived China's political reforms.

In 2021, the Resolution on the Major Achievements and Historical Experience of the Party over the Past Century evaluated Deng's tenure as:

After the third plenary session of the 11th Central Committee, Chinese communists, with Comrade Deng Xiaoping as their chief representative, united and led the whole Party and the entire nation in conducting a thorough review of the experience gained and lessons learned since the founding of the People's Republic. On this basis, and by focusing on the fundamental questions of what socialism is and how to build it and drawing lessons from the history of world socialism, they established Deng Xiaoping Theory, and devoted their efforts to freeing minds and seeking truth from facts. The historic decision was made to shift the focus of the Party and the country's work onto economic development and to launch the reform and opening up drive. Chinese communists brought the essence of socialism to light, set the basic line for the primary stage of socialism, and made it clear that China would follow its own path and build socialism with Chinese characteristics. They provided sensible answers to a series of basic questions on building socialism with Chinese characteristics, and formulated a development strategy for basically achieving socialist modernization by the middle of the 21st century through a three-step approach. They thus succeeded in founding socialism with Chinese characteristics.

== Works ==
- Deng Xiaoping (1995). Selected Works of Deng Xiaoping: 1938–1965. Vol. I (2nd ed.). Beijing: Foreign Languages Press. ISBN 7-119-01456-0. Archived from the original on 25 February 2020.
- — (1995). Selected Works of Deng Xiaoping: 1975–1982. Vol. 2 (2nd ed.). Beijing: Foreign Languages Press. ISBN 7-119-00167-1. Archived from the original on 25 February 2020.
- — (1994). Selected Works of Deng Xiaoping: 1982–1992. Vol. 3 (1st ed.). Beijing: Foreign Languages Press. ISBN 7-119-01689-X. Archived from the original on 25 February 2020.
- — (2014). 邓小平文集(一九四九——一九七四年). Beijing: People's Publishing House. ISBN 978-7-01-013823-7.
- — (1984). Build Socialism with Chinese Characteristics 建设有中国特色的社会主义 (PDF). Beijing: People's Publishing House. ISBN 0-8351-1553-4.

== See also ==
- Reform and opening up
- Moderately prosperous society

== Explanatory notes ==
Party political offices
Preceded by Rao Shushi	Head of the Organization Department of the CCP Central Committee; 1954–1956	Succeeded by An Ziwen
Preceded by Mao Zedong as Chairman of the Central Secretariat	Secretary-General of the CCP Central Secretariat; 1956–1966	Post abolished
Preceded by Zhou Enlai; Kang Sheng; Li Desheng; Ye Jianying; Wang Hongwen	Vice Chairman of the Chinese Communist Party; 1975–1976; Served alongside: Zhou Enlai, Hua Guofeng, Kang Sheng, Li Desheng, Ye Jianying and Wang Hongwen	Succeeded by Hua Guofeng; Ye Jianying; Wang Hongwen
Preceded by Ye Jianying	Vice Chairman of the Chinese Communist Party; 1977–1982; Served alongside: Li Xiannian, Wang Dongxing, Chen Yun, Ye Jianying, Zhao Ziyang and Hua Guofeng	Post abolished
Preceded by Hua Guofeng	Chairman of the CCP Central Military Commission; 1981–1989	Succeeded by Jiang Zemin
New title	Chairman of the CCP Central Advisory Commission; 1982–1987	Succeeded by Chen Yun
Government offices
Preceded by Bo Yibo	Minister of Finance; 1953–1954	Succeeded by Li Xiannian
Preceded by Lin Biao	First-ranked Vice-Premier of the State Council; 1975–1976	Succeeded by Zhang Chunqiao
Preceded by Li Xiannian	First-ranked Vice-Premier of the State Council; 1977–1980	Succeeded by Wan Li
New title	Chairman of the PRC Central Military Commission; 1983–1990	Succeeded by Jiang Zemin
Political offices
Vacant Title last held by Zhou Enlai	Chairman of the Chinese People's Political Consultative Conference; 1978–1983	Succeeded by Deng Yingchao
Military offices
Vacant Title last held by Huang Yongsheng	Head of the People's Liberation Army General Staff Department; 1975–1976	Vacant
Vacant	Head of the People's Liberation Army General Staff Department; 1977–1980	Succeeded by Yang Dezhi
Order of precedence
Preceded by Zhao Ziyang as General Secretary of the Party (1st ranked)	Orders of precedence in the People's Republic of China; Chairman of the Central Military Commission (2nd-ranked)	Succeeded by Yang Shangkun as President of China (3rd ranked)
Preceded by Zhao Ziyang as General Secretary of the Party (1st ranked)	Orders of precedence in the People's Republic of China; Chairman of the Central Military Commission (2nd-ranked)	Succeeded by Li Xiannian as President of China (3rd ranked)
Preceded by Hu Yaobang as General Secretary of the Party (1st-ranked)	Orders of precedence in the People's Republic of China	Succeeded by Zhao Ziyang as Premier of the State Council (3rd-ranked)
Preceded by Ye Jianying as Chairman of the National People's Congress Standing Committee (2nd-ranked)	Orders of precedence in the People's Republic of China; Chairman of the Central Military Commission (3rd-ranked)	Succeeded by Zhao Ziyang as Premier of the State Council (4th-ranked)
