= Secretary-General of the Chinese Communist Party =

Former senior leadership position in the CCP

- Simplified Chinese: 中共中央秘书长
Transcriptions

The secretary-general of the Chinese Communist Party was a senior leadership position of the Chinese Communist Party (CCP) to assist in the daily work of the Central Committee. The secretary-general was established at the beginning of the founding of the CCP. However, due to the loss of information during the Long March and the Chinese Civil War, the records of the early secretaries-general were incomplete. Deng Xiaoping, the second-generation leader of China, served three times in the early years as the secretary-general of the Central Committee. The position of the secretary-general was renamed as general secretary from 1956 to 1966 and from 1980 to 1982. At that time, the leader of the CCP was the chairman of the Central Committee. The general secretary assisted the party chairman and vice chairmen in handling works of the Secretariat. Deng Xiaoping and Hu Yaobang successively served as the secretary-general and general secretary during the period of Chairman Mao Zedong and Chairman Hua Guofeng respectively.

== List of secretaries-general ==
| Name | Took office | Left office | Position(s) |
|---|---|---|---|
| Mao Zedong | June 1923 | ??? | Secretary of Central Bureau |
| ??? | January 1925 | ??? | Head of the Secretariat |
| Wang Ruofei | July 1926 | April 1927 | Secretary-general of the Central Committee |
| Li Weihan (no show) | April 1927 | ??? | Secretary-general of the Central Committee |
| Chen Duxiu (acting) | April 1927 | ??? | Secretary-general of the Central Committee; General Secretary of the Central Committee |
| Cai Hesen | ??? | ??? | Secretary-general of the Central Committee; Head of the Propaganda Department |
| Zhang Guotao | ??? | June 1927 | Secretary-general of the Central Committee; Head of the Organization Department |
| Deng Zhongxia | June 1927 | August 1927 | Secretary-general of the Central Committee |
| Li Weihan | August 1927 | June 1928 | Secretary-general of the Central Committee |
| Deng Xiaoping | December 1927 | July 1929 | Secretary-general of the Secretariat |
| Zhou Enlai | June 1928 | October 1928 | Secretary-general of the Central Committee; Head of the Organization Department |
| Li Lisan | October 1928 | ??? | Secretary-general of the Central Committee |
| Yu Zehong | July 1929 | June 1930 | Secretary-general of the Secretariat |
| Li Lisan | June 1930 | September 1930 | Secretary-general of the Central Committee; Secretary-general of the Secretariat |
| Huang Wenrong | June 1930 | ??? | Secretary-general of the Secretariat |
| Ke Qingshi | June 1931 | May 1933 | temporary Secretary-general of the Central Committee |
| Ke Qingshi | May 1933 | ??? | Secretary-general of the Shanghai Central Bureau |
| Deng Yingchao | January 1934 | January 1935 | Secretary-general of the Central Committee |
| Deng Xiaoping | January 1935 | December 1935 | Secretary-general of the Central Committee |
| Zhang Wenbin | December 1935 | August 1937 | Secretary-general of the Central Committee |
| Wang Shoudao | December 1935 | August 1937 | Secretary-general of the Secretariat |
| Liu Ying | ??? | ??? | Secretary-general of the Secretariat |
| Wang Ruofei | August 1937 | March 1940 | Secretary-general of the Central Committee |
| Ren Bishi | September 1941 | October 1950 | Secretary-general of the Central Committee |
| Deng Xiaoping | April 1954 | September 1956 | Secretary-general of the Central Committee |
| Hu Yaobang | December 1978 | February 1980 | Secretary-general of the Central Committee; Head of the Propaganda Department |

== See also ==
- Chinese Communist Party Committee Secretary
