= Vice Chairman of the Chinese Communist Party =

Highest rank under the Chairman within the Chinese Communist Party from 1956 to 1982

Vice Chairman of the Central Committee of the Chinese Communist Party
- 中国共产党中央委员会副主席
- Emblem of the Chinese Communist Party (1942–1996)

- Flag of the Chinese Communist Party (1942–1996)
- Central Committee of the Chinese Communist Party
- Style: Vice Chairman (副主席) (informal); Comrade (同志) (formal)
- Member of: Politburo Standing Committee
- Reports to: Central Committee
- Seat: Zhongnanhai, Beijing, China
- Nominator: Central Committee
- Appointer: Central Committee
- Term length: Five years, renewable
- Constituting instrument: Party Constitution
- Formation: 26 September 1956; 69 years ago
- Abolished: 1 September 1982; 44 years ago

Vice Chairman of the Central Committee of the Chinese Communist Party
- Simplified Chinese: 中国共产党中央委员会副主席
- Traditional Chinese: 中國共產黨中央委員會副主席
Transcriptions
Standard Mandarin
- Hanyu Pinyin: Zhōngguó Gòngchǎndǎng Zhōngyāng Wěiyuánhuì Fùzhǔxí

Commonly abbreviated as
- Chinese: 中共中央副主席
Transcriptions
Standard Mandarin
- Hanyu Pinyin: Zhōnggòng Zhōngyāng Fùzhǔxí

The vice chairman of the Central Committee of the Chinese Communist Party was the second-highest rank within the Chinese Communist Party (CCP) after the chairman from 1956 to 1982. The position was phased out after 1982 in order to remove the "Chairman" position from any government posting, resigning it solely to the late Mao Zedong.

All vice chairmen were members of the Politburo Standing Committee of the Chinese Communist Party.

== List of Vice Chairmen ==
Term	Image	Name	Term		Chairman	Note
Term	Image	Name	Term start	Term end	Chairman	Note
8th Central Committee		Liu Shaoqi	28 September 1956	12 August 1966	Mao Zedong	In office until the Eleventh Plenary Session
8th Central Committee		Zhou Enlai	28 September 1956	12 August 1966	Mao Zedong	In office until the Eleventh Plenary Session
8th Central Committee		Zhu De	28 September 1956	12 August 1966	Mao Zedong	In office until the Eleventh Plenary Session
8th Central Committee		Chen Yun	28 September 1956	12 August 1966	Mao Zedong	In office until the Eleventh Plenary Session
8th Central Committee		Lin Biao	25 May 1958	28 April 1969	Mao Zedong	Elected at the Fifth Plenary Session
9th Central Committee		Lin Biao	28 April 1969	13 September 1971 †	Mao Zedong	The only party vice-chairman
10th Central Committee		Hua Guofeng	6 April 1976	6 October 1976	Mao Zedong ↓ Hua Guofeng	First Vice-chairman
10th Central Committee		Zhou Enlai	30 August 1973	8 January 1976 †	Mao Zedong ↓ Hua Guofeng	Died in office
10th Central Committee		Wang Hongwen	30 August 1973	7 October 1976	Mao Zedong ↓ Hua Guofeng	Gang of Four, arrested in 1976, expelled in 1977
10th Central Committee		Kang Sheng	30 August 1973	16 December 1975 †	Mao Zedong ↓ Hua Guofeng	Died in office
10th Central Committee		Ye Jianying	30 August 1973	19 August 1977	Mao Zedong ↓ Hua Guofeng	From October 1976 to July 1977, was the only Party Vice-chairman
10th Central Committee		Li Desheng	30 August 1973	10 January 1975	Mao Zedong ↓ Hua Guofeng	Resigned at the Second Plenary Session
10th Central Committee		Deng Xiaoping	10 January 1975	19 August 1977	Mao Zedong ↓ Hua Guofeng	Elected at the Second Plenary Session. Removed from office due to Tiananmen Incident. Reinstated at the Third Plenum
11th Central Committee		Ye Jianying	19 August 1977	6 September 1982	Hua Guofeng ↓ Hu Yaobang	
11th Central Committee		Deng Xiaoping	19 August 1977	6 September 1982	Hua Guofeng ↓ Hu Yaobang	
11th Central Committee		Li Xiannian	19 August 1977	6 September 1982	Hua Guofeng ↓ Hu Yaobang	
11th Central Committee		Wang Dongxing	19 August 1977	29 February 1980	Hua Guofeng ↓ Hu Yaobang	Resigned at the Fifth Plenary Session
11th Central Committee		Chen Yun	22 December 1978	6 September 1982	Hua Guofeng ↓ Hu Yaobang	Elected at the Third Plenary Session
11th Central Committee		Zhao Ziyang	29 June 1981	6 September 1982	Hua Guofeng ↓ Hu Yaobang	Elected at the Sixth Plenary Session
11th Central Committee		Hua Guofeng	29 June 1981	6 September 1982	Hua Guofeng ↓ Hu Yaobang	Elected at the Sixth Plenary Session
