= Beijing Revolutionary Committee =

Local governing body during the Cultural Revolution

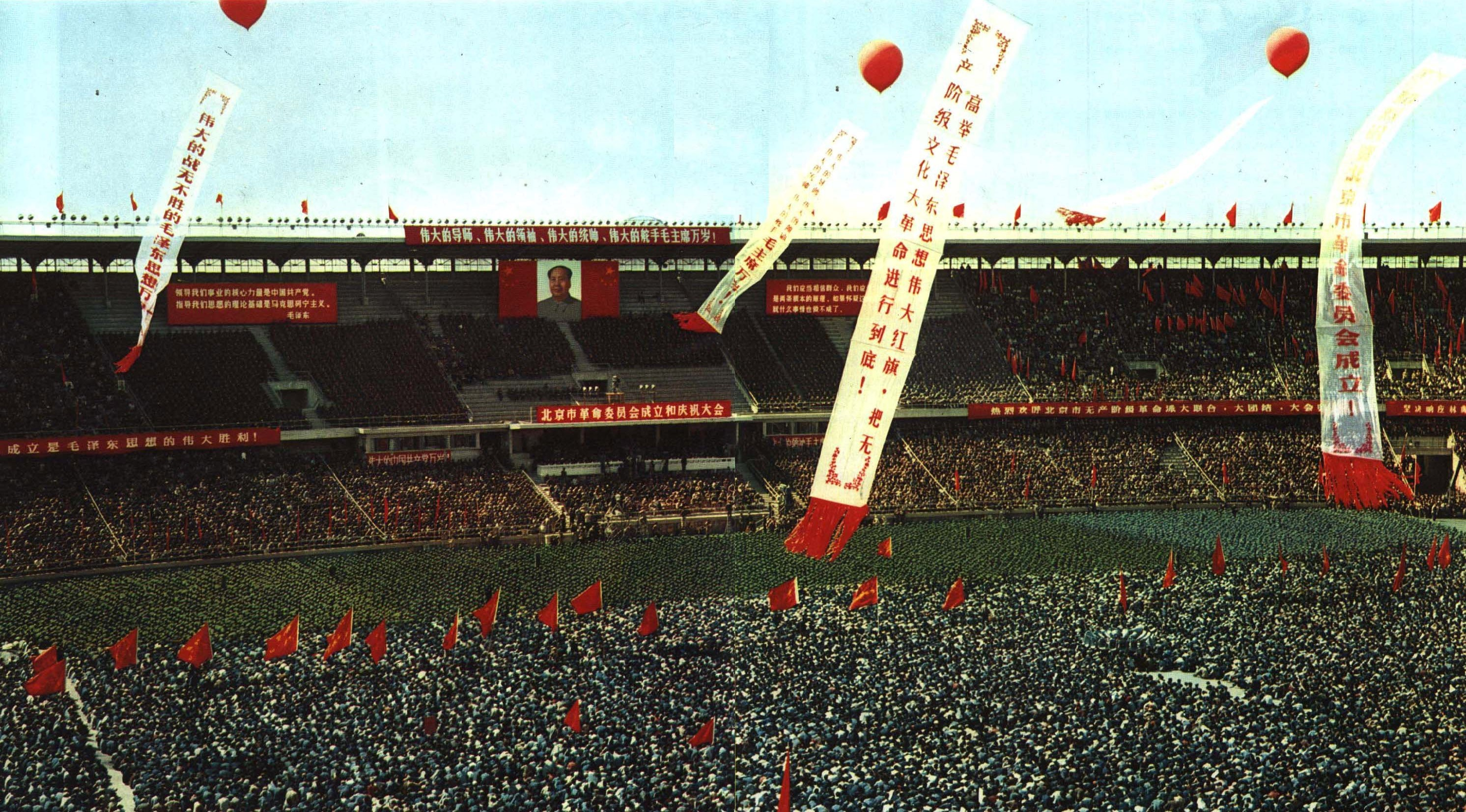
On April 20, 1967, the Workers' Stadium celebrated the founding meeting of the Beijing Revolutionary Committee.

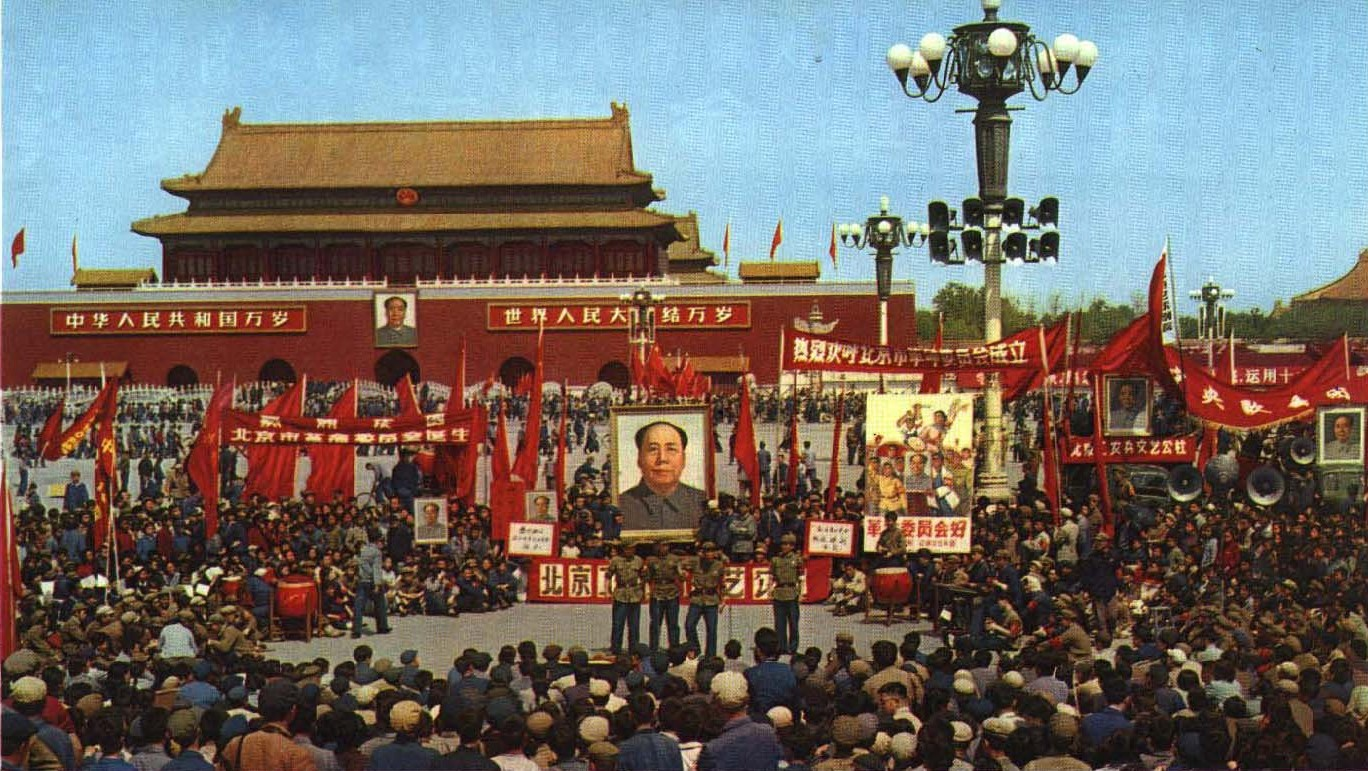
On April 20, 1967, the founding of the Beijing Revolutionary Committee was celebrated in front of Tiananmen Square

Beijing Revolutionary Committee, also known as Beijing Municipal Revolutionary Committee, was a revolutionary committee established on April 20, 1967, replacing the Beijing Municipal People's Committee. It was the highest administrative unit in Beijing. With the end of the Cultural Revolution in December 1979, the Third Session of the Seventh Beijing Municipal People's Congress abolished the Beijing Revolutionary Committee and restored the Beijing Municipal People's Government.

== Background ==
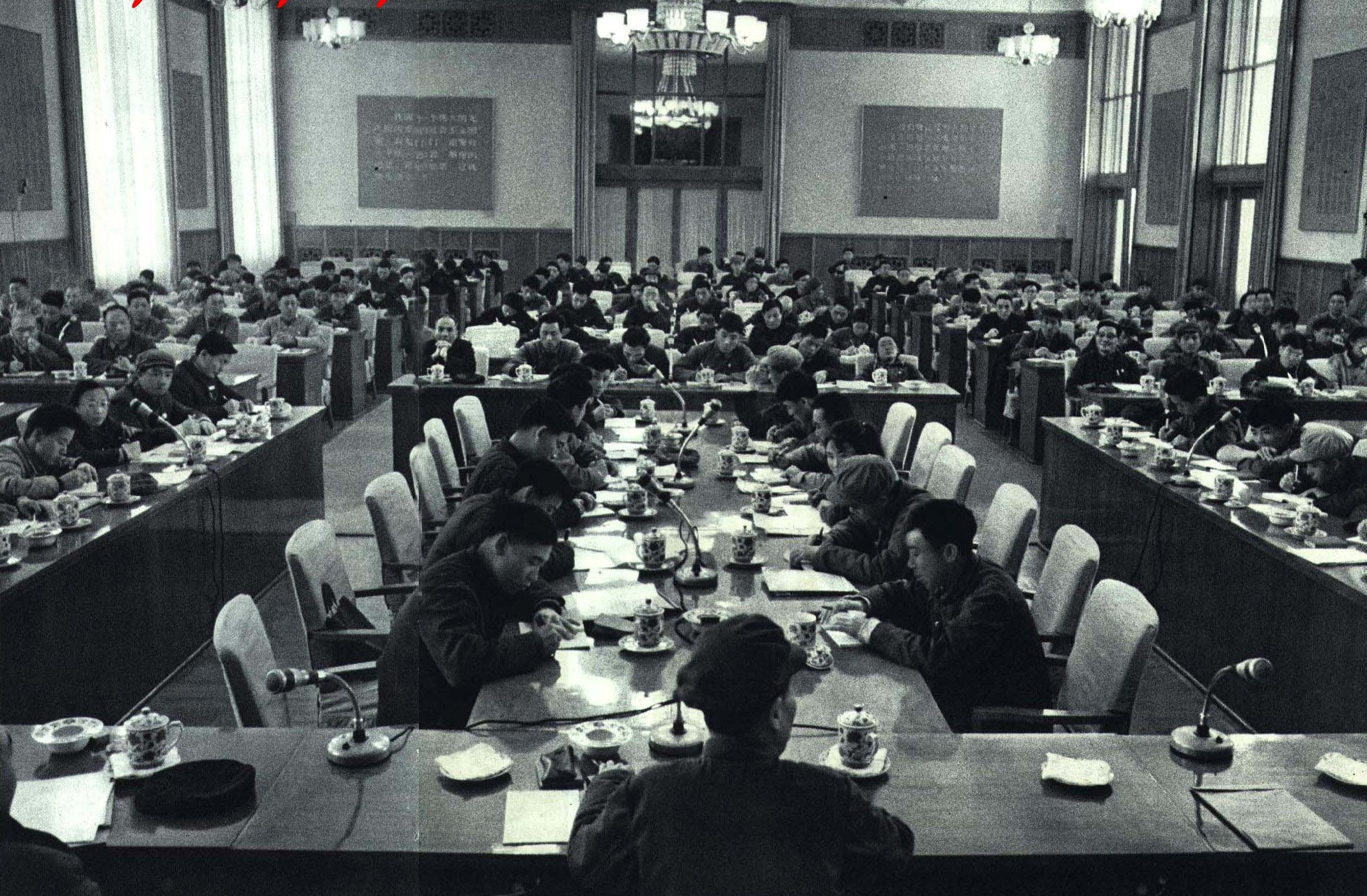
The first plenary session of the Beijing Revolutionary Committee in 1967

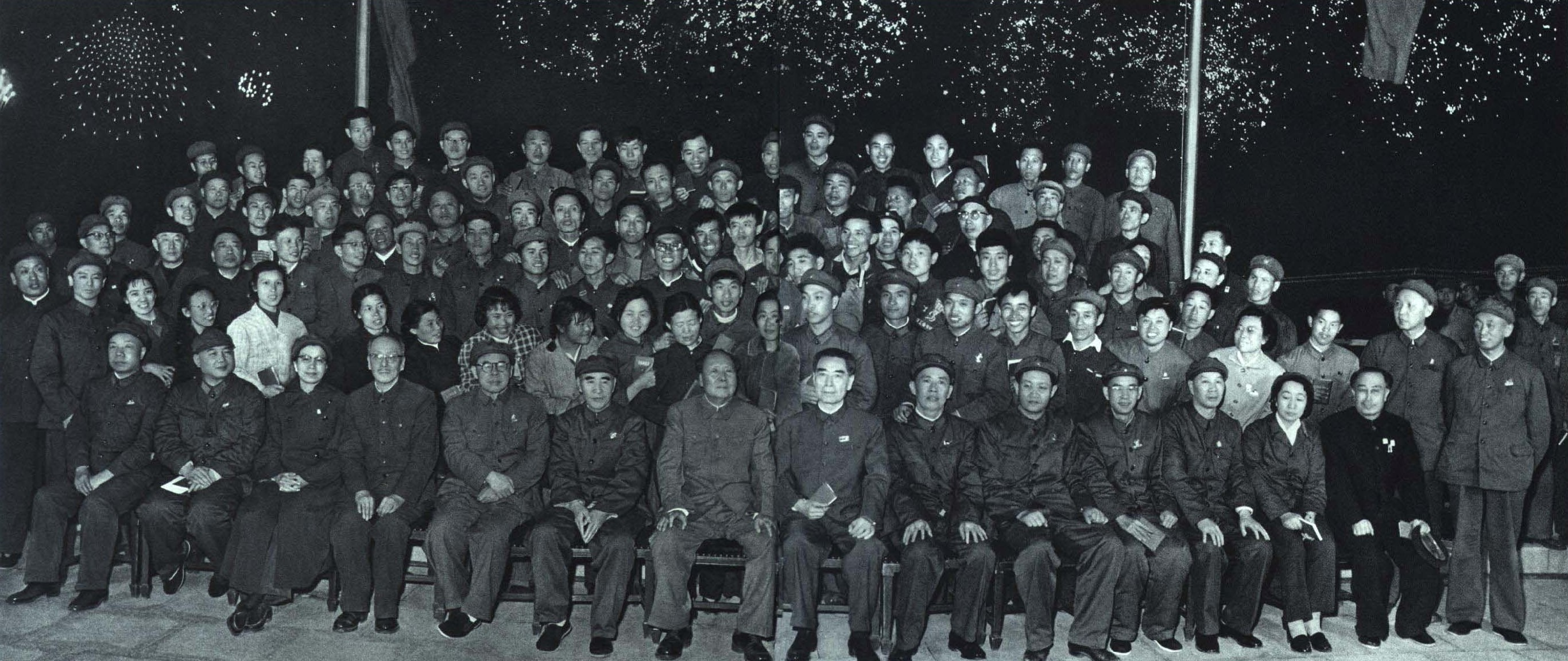
Mao Zedong and others met with members of the Beijing Revolutionary Committee on May 1, 1967

In 1959, Wu Han, the deputy mayor of Beijing, wrote many politically charged plays such as "Hai Rui Dismissed from Office", which were appreciated by Mao Zedong. On November 10, 1965, Yao Wenyuan wrote "On the New Historical Play 'Dismissal of Hai Rui'" and published it in Shanghai's Wenhui Bao, which suddenly criticized the historically acclaimed "Hai Rui Dismissed from Office". However, the criticism of Wu Han was opposed by the Beijing Municipal Committee of the Chinese Communist Party, headed by Peng Zhen (the first secretary of the Beijing Municipal Committee). On February 3, 1966, Peng Zhen called an enlarged meeting of the Five Man Group and proposed the drafting of the "Report Outline on Current Academic Discussions" (or the February Outline), proposing that academic issues should be separated from politics and opposing the involvement of Wu Han in the 1959 Lushan Conference. On the 5th, Peng Zhen attended the meeting of the Politburo Standing Committee of the Chinese Communist Party chaired by Liu Shaoqi. The meeting discussed and passed the report outline. In February 1966, Liu Shaoqi presided over a meeting of the Politburo Standing Committee of the Chinese Communist Party and adopted the February Outline. It clearly opposed the elevation of academic issues to political disputes, which formed a sharp contrast with Mao Zedong's intentions and the trend of the Cultural Revolution. In late March, Mao Zedong had several conversations with Kang Sheng, Jiang Qing and others, criticizing the February Outline for confusing class boundaries and being wrong. He ordered the entire Communist Party to issue a notice to revoke the February Outlin". Mao Zedong also said: "The Beijing Municipal Committee is impenetrable. The Municipal Committee must be dissolved."

Afterwards, the 16 May Notification drafted by Chen Boda and others was reviewed and revised by Mao Zedong eight times and finally passed on May 16 after discussion at the Politburo of the Chinese Communist Party's enlarged meeting . In addition to criticizing Peng Zhen by name, the notification also announced the cancellation of the February Outline and the Five Man Group and the establishment of the Cultural Revolution Group. On May 18, responding to Mao Zedong's orders, Lin Biao and issued the May 18 Speech to prevent a coup. Afterwards, Luo Ruiqing, Lu Dingyi, Yang Shangkun and others who were related to Liu Shaoqi and Peng Zhen were removed from power.

From May 4 to 26, 1966, Peng Zhen was denounced at the Politburo Standing Committee of the Chinese Communist Party's enlarged meeting. He was removed from his post as secretary of the CCP Central Secretariat and dismissed from his posts as first secretary of the CCP Beijing Municipal Committee and mayor of Beijing. On June 4, 1966, the People's Daily published the CCP Central Committee's Decision on the Reorganization of the Beijing Municipal Committee, appointing Li Xuefeng, first secretary of the North China Bureau, as first secretary of the Beijing Municipal Committee and Wu De, first secretary of the Jilin Provincial Committee, as secretary of the Beijing Municipal Committee, thus reorganizing the leadership team of the CCP Beijing Municipal Committee. However, with the frequent change in appointees, the new CCP Beijing Municipal Committee found it difficult to function normally and soon became paralyzed.

== History ==
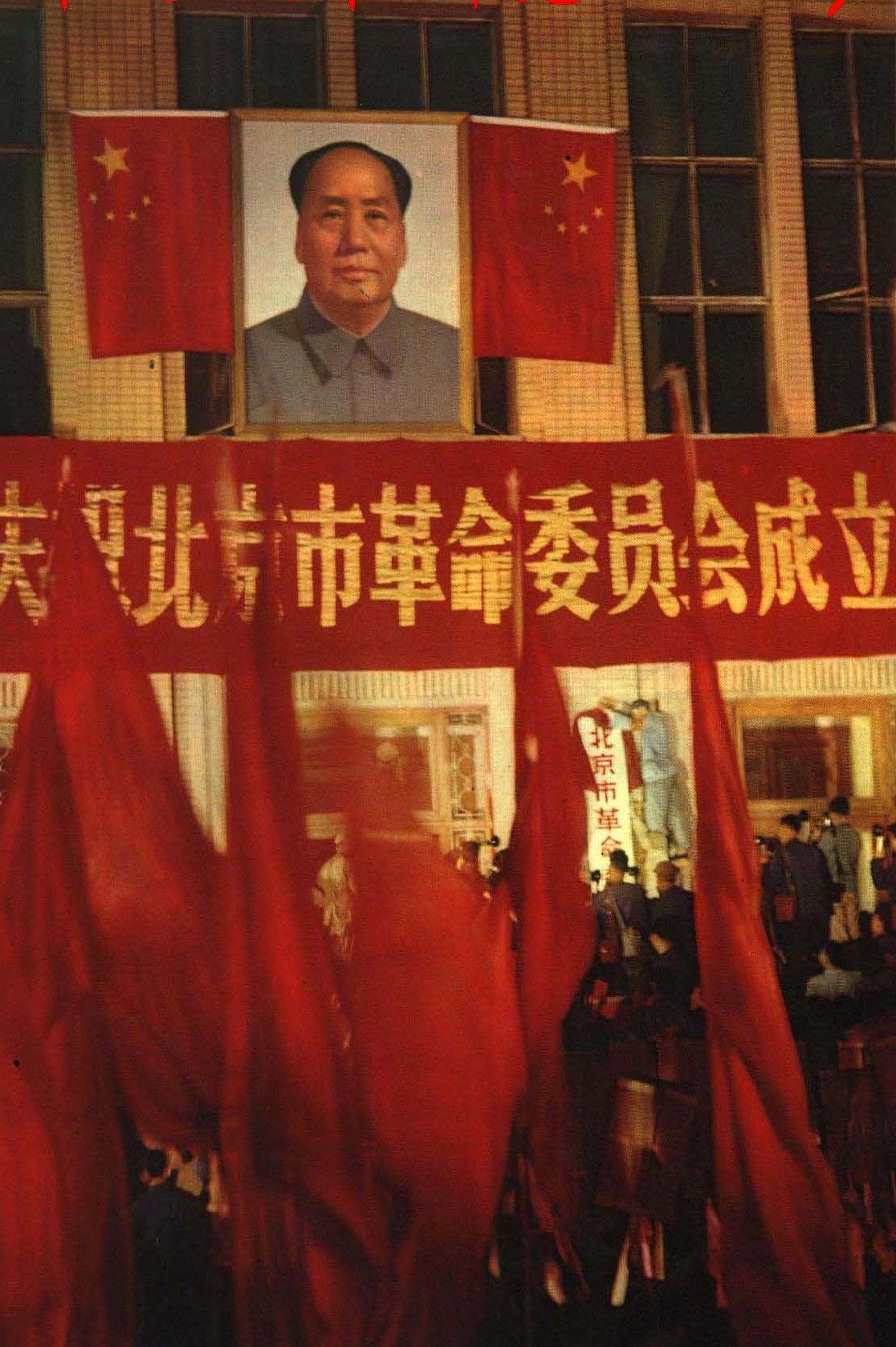
In 1967, the Beijing Revolutionary Committee was established.

In 1967, the January Storm broke out in Shanghai and had a strong impact across the country, triggering a series of local coups. In the same year, Shanxi (January 14), Shandong (February 3), Heilongjiang (January 31), Guizhou (January 25) and other provinces seized power. On January 18, 1967, the Beijing Municipal Committee for Seizing Power was established, but it was not recognized by the central government. On April 20 of the same year, 100,000 people in Beijing gathered to celebrate the birth of the Beijing Revolutionary Committee and passed the Revolutionary Committee's "Letter of Tribute to Chairman Mao". Zhou Enlai attended the meeting on behalf of Mao Zedong, Lin Biao, the Central Committee of the CCP, the State Council of the People's Republic of China, and the Central Military Commission and spoke. Chen Boda, Kang Sheng, Li Fuchun, Xiao Hua, Yang Chengwu and others attended. Jiang Qing spoke on behalf of the Central Cultural Revolution Group. Xie Fuzhi spoke on behalf of the Beijing Revolutionary Committee. Zhang Chunqiao spoke on behalf of the delegation of the Revolutionary Committees of five provinces and cities.

In his speech, Xie Fuzhi said: "The old Beijing Municipal Committee, which had long been entrenched by a handful of counter-revolutionary revisionists, has always waved the 'red flag' to oppose the red flag under the protection and support of the largest handful of capitalist roaders in the Party. They have always implemented a blockade against the Party Central Committee headed by Chairman Mao, turning Beijing into an independent kingdom where 'no one can get in' and 'no water can get in', in a vain attempt to turn Beijing into a base for their counter-revolutionary restoration. This counter-revolutionary revisionist group is a big bully riding on the heads of the broad masses of the Beijing people, and has committed heinous crimes against the Party and the people." Xie claimed that it was necessary to "smash the old nest of the counter-revolutionary revisionists in the old Municipal Committee and defeat them completely", "fully mobilize the masses and carry out mass movements", and "recapture all the positions usurped by them". Workers' representatives, representatives of the People's Liberation Army of the garrison area, and representatives of the Red Guards from colleges and universities also spoke. At the end of the conference, the audience sang "Sailing the Seas Depends on the Helmsman" and "The Internationale".

Because of the advocacy of "streamlining institutions" and "delegating cadres to work", the Beijing Revolutionary Committee was "united" from its formal establishment on April 20, 1967, until the establishment of the Fourth Beijing Municipal Committee of the CCP on March 15, 1971. That is, there was no title of Beijing Municipal Committee of the CCP. After the establishment of the Fourth Beijing Municipal Committee of the CCP, the powers of the party and government began to separate. In December 1979, the Third Session of the Seventh Beijing Municipal People's Congress abolished the Beijing Revolutionary Committee and restored the Beijing Municipal People's Government. The district and county people's governments and street offices were also restored.

== Jurisdiction ==
The Beijing Revolutionary Committee has a total of 37 district, county and bureau-level units under its jurisdiction.

Among them, Pinggu, Changping, Daxing, Shunyi, Shijingshan, Fengtai, Xuanwu, Xicheng, Tongxian, Miyun, Huairou, Haidian, Chaoyang, Dongcheng, Chongwen, Mentougou, Fangshan, and Yanqing, a total of 18 districts and counties, successively established district and county revolutionary committees between September 1967 and February 1968, with a core leading group of the CCP. The Beijing Revolutionary Committee abolished the original 45 municipal bureaus and merged them into 19 bureaus. With the approval of the Municipal Revolutionary Committee, each bureau established a revolutionary leading group with a core leading group for of the CCP.
