= Central Case Examination Group =

Chinese Communist Party internal secret police during the Cultural Revolution

The Central Case Examination Group (Chinese: 中央专案组; CCEG) was a special organization established in the People's Republic of China in 1966 under the aegis of the Politburo Standing Committee of the Chinese Communist Party to persecute those accused of "anti-party activities". It was, in essence, an organization dedicated to political persecution of senior party leaders as well as ordinary functionaries. Initially conceptualized as a beachhead by Chairman Mao Zedong's most radical supporters to 'gather dirt' on opponents of the Cultural Revolution, it later began taking up cases against all manner of perceived political opponents irrespective of their ideological allegiance. Many of its early leaders, such as Jiang Qing, later themselves became the subject of persecution by the Group. The Group was compared by Cultural Revolution-era propagandist Wang Li to the Soviet Cheka, but he noted that the CCEG had even broader powers. Its leading members included nearly all of the members of the Cultural Revolution Group (CRG) as well as Premier Zhou Enlai and the chief of Mao's security detail Wang Dongxing. The CCEG worked closely with the CRG during its investigations.

== Background ==
The precursor to the CCEG was the Special Case Examination Committee, an organ established by the Politburo in May 1966 to investigate the political offences of Peng Zhen, Luo Ruiqing, Lu Dingyi and Yang Shangkun. When it was found that there was a need for analysis of other cases, the committee was retained under a new name, and soon achieved a permanence as a central institution.

== Role in the Cultural Revolution ==
The Central Case Examination Group was founded at roughly the same time as the Cultural Revolution Group (CRG). The CRG was essentially "command central" of the Cultural Revolution. However, unlike the CRG, the CCEG was to operate throughout the entire of the Cultural Revolution decade and beyond, investigating and reporting on the purported crimes of many of the members of the higher echelons of the Chinese Communist Party (CCP) and all people considered to be counterrevolutionary. The group's highest profile case was that of Chinese President Liu Shaoqi, whose case was reportedly investigated by 400,000 people (including some Red Guards from Peking University), looking at over four million files. The findings of the CCEG on President Liu Shaoqi were compiled into a seventy-four page report to be considered by the Twelfth Plenum of the Eighth Central Committee of the CCP that met in October 1968. It was at this plenum that Liu Shaoqi was officially expelled from the CCP.

The CCEG's membership included most of the membership of the Cultural Revolution Group and Zhou Enlai, with Mao Zedong's wife Jiang Qing taking a particularly active role in the building of cases against individuals. In addition, other members included Wang Dongxing and Ye Qun, the wife of Lin Biao.

"The Case Examination Group was a horrible, harmful institution... it had unlimited powers and it answered to no one. The group could choose to purge whomever it wanted, and had the power to throw people in prison; it even dictated how long the prison term was... the Group must be buried forever... it had strong autocratic tendencies and operated on the whims of the individual. So long as the Group exists, we will never become a democratic society based on rule of law. If not handled well, the Central Commission for Discipline Inspection may be at risk of becoming a bigger version of the CCEG."

—Wang Li, as quoted in the memoirs of Deng Liqun

The CCEG was responsible to the Politburo Standing Committee, and wielded significant power in the realm of public security. It took the decisions to arrest, torture and imprison suspected 'revisionist' elements. For example, at the time of Twelfth Plenum in October 1968, 88 fully fledged or 'alternate' members of the CC were under CCEG investigation.

By the autumn of 1967, the CCEG had become too large an operation for its existing structure, and so the group was subdivided into a First Office and a Second Office. The First Office, led by Wang Dongxing, took responsibility for the cases from the initial phases of the Cultural Revolution, including cases surrounding Peng Zhen and his supporters. The Second Office, led by Yang Chengwu and (following Yang's demise in March 1968) General Huang Yongsheng, was solely concerned with the cases of members of the military. It took over several cases of senior PLA soldiers, including that of Marshal He Long. In 1968, a Third Office was established under Xie Fuzhi to investigate the May 16th Conspiracy, involving some members of the Cultural Revolution Group. The Third Office would later take on other cases of conspiracy groups.

Although there were suggestions that the CCEG should be dissolved at the same time as the Cultural Revolution Group, in 1969, it was retained as an institution for the remainder of the Cultural Revolution decade, continuing its investigative role until after the Cultural Revolution itself ended. In 1970, the group started to examine the case against Chen Boda, who was one of the staunchest proponents of the Cultural Revolution but by this point had fallen from political favour, and in 1971 the CCEG also began to investigate Lin Biao. In 1975, in an effort to bring the Cultural Revolution to a close, Mao ordered that the CCEG conclude its major cases swiftly and release of some prisoners. This led to the release of around 300 prisoners in the middle of 1975.

== Dissolution ==
The last case assigned to the CCEG was the case of the 'Gang of Four'. Jiang Qing, once an active member of the CCEG, came under investigation by the very apparatus she had been involved in. After completing its analysis of the 'Gang of Four' case, the Central Case Examination Group was formally dissolved after thirteen years of operation at the Third Plenary Session of the 11th CPC Central Committee, held in December 1978.

== See also ==
- Cultural Revolution Group
