= Qi Benyu =

Chinese political theorist (1931–2016)

- Chinese: 戚本禹
Transcriptions
Standard Mandarin
- Hanyu Pinyin: Qī Běnyǔ
- Wade–Giles: Ch'i Pen-yü

Qi Benyu (1931 – 20 April 2016) was a Chinese Communist theorist, mainly active during the Cultural Revolution. Qi was a member of the ultra-left Cultural Revolution Group, director of the Department of Petitions and deputy director of the Secretary Bureau of the Central Committee of the Chinese Communist Party. Qi also acted as head of the history department of the communist theory journal Red Flag. In 1968 he was arrested, stripped of all his positions, and sent to prison.

== Life ==
=== Youth ===
Born in Weihai, Shandong province, Qi Benyu attended the Central School of the Communist Youth League of China and entered the Chinese Communist Party in the early 1950s when still being a student. Upon graduation he became assistant to Tian Jiaying, the secretary of Mao Zedong. In 1963 he wrote an article on Li Xiucheng, which for the first time gave him Mao's approval for his radical approach. He became a member of the Board of Editors of the Party journal Red Flag. There, on 8 December 1965, following Yao Wenyuan's "Criticism of Hai Rui Dismissed from Office", he published the article "Study History for the Revolution", in which he criticised the most famous historians of the time by denouncing their historism as capitalist. The article was mainly aimed at Jian Bozan but did not name him.

Mao very much appreciated the article, praising the author: "Who are today's authorities? It's Yao Wenyuan, Qi Benyu, Yin Da... People of low age, low knowledge, sturdy opinions and stable political experiences". Qi thereupon followed with articles attacking Wu Han and again Jian Bozan, this time by name. Both articles were also published in the People's Daily and gave Qi his reputation as a radical theorist.

=== Political ascendancy ===
Qi Benyu's sudden rise in the hierarchy of the Communist Party began in mid-1966 with the proclamation of the Cultural Revolution. In May, Qi was appointed member of the Cultural Revolution Group and only shortly afterwards deputy director of the Secretary Bureau (秘书局; mishuju) of the Central Committee of the Chinese Communist Party and acting director of the Secretary Bureau. At the Red Flag, he rose to Deputy Editor-in-Chief. Also, still in 1966 he became secretary of Mao and his wife Jiang Qing. With the articles and speeches written by him, he played a large role in the campaigns against Liu Shaoqi, Deng Xiaoping and the old establishment of the Party as well as in heating up the atmosphere during the Cultural Revolution.

His arguably most important article during this time was Patriotism or National Betrayal? —On the Reactionary Film Inside Story of the Ching Court published on March 30, 1967, in the Red Flag. Highly appraised by Mao, the article also appeared in the People's Daily and initiated a new wave of campaigns against Liu Shaoqi, to whom the article refers to as "the biggest capitalist roader in the Party" and "China's Khrushchev".

Qi then began to directly intervene in politics by inciting Red Guards to forcefully bring Peng Dehuai back from Sichuan and to enter the Governmental District of Beijing, Zhongnanhai, to attack Liu, Deng, Zhu De and Tao Zhu.

=== Wang-Guan-Qi-Affair ===
From 1967 on Qi, together with Wang Li, Guan Feng and other members of the Cultural Revolution Group, started to accelerate Mao's plans for implementing the Cultural Revolution in the army too, and were calling for the peoples to find out the "few capitalist roaders" within the People's Liberation Army (PLA). The same radicalisation was to be achieved in foreign policy, which culminated in the attack on the British Embassy in Beijing on August 22. For Mao now saw himself confronted with growing opposition inside the Party and chaotic turbulences in his most important power base, the army, he decided to let down the so-called "Three Small", Wang, Guan and Qi. Qi was arrested on January 13, 1968, and lost all positions in- and outside the party. All three of them were brought to the notorious Qincheng Prison.

Jiang Qing was disclosing the main charge in a speech in front of officers of the PLA: The "Wang-Guan-Qi Anti-Party Clique" would have been working secretly for Liu Shaoqi, Deng Xiaoping and Tao Zhu since the beginning of the Cultural Revolution. Though staying in prison all the time, it was only on July 14, 1980, that Qi was officially arrested by the Beijing Police. On November 2, 1983, the Intermediate People's Court Beijing sentenced him to 18 years in prison on terms of being a member of the counterrevolutionary clique of Lin Biao and Jiang Qing as well as 'counterrevolutionary propaganda', 'wrong accusations' and 'inciting of the masses' (打砸抢; da-za-qiang). Having by then already spent 15 years in prison, he was discharged after 3 more years in 1986.

=== Post-prison ===
One event in his post-prison years was his criticism of Li Zhisui's biography of the private life of Mao. Despite his persecution at the hands of Mao, Qi criticised Li's portrayal of the Chinese leader, claiming that "aside from his account of the support-the-left activities (支左; zhi zuo) in which he [Li] personally participated, most of the Cultural Revolution part of his memoirs consists of stuff gleaned from newspapers, journals and other people's writings. To make Western readers believe that he had access to core secrets, Li fabricated scenarios, resulting in countless errors in his memoirs." Having lived in proximity to Mao for a number of years, Qi remarked that during this time he heard no rumour of Mao ever having extra-marital affairs despite the fact that other senior Party members were known to, and that Mao was always respectful towards "female comrades". Due to this and other reasons, Qi believed Li's claim that Mao had affairs was a lie.

However, Qi was an unrepentant Maoist, and after prison he moved to Shanghai and continued to express support for Maoist doctrine. Ye Yonglie, a writer who befriended Qi, remarked upon Qi's death: "Till his death, Qi Benyu remained a leftist." He never wavered from insisting on the rightness of Mao Zedong and his ideas.”

=== Death ===
Qi died on 20 April 2016 at the age of 85 in Shanghai.
