= May Sixteenth elements =

Ultra-left group during the Cultural Revolution

May Sixteenth elements (五一六分子) were named after the so-called May Sixteenth Army Corps (五一六兵团; 1967–1968), ultra-left Red Guards in Beijing during the early years of the Cultural Revolution (1966–1976) who targeted Zhou Enlai with the backing of Jiang Qing. The name came from a May 16, 1966 notice (五一六通知) which Chen Boda wrote the initial draft of, and which Mao Zedong substantially revised. However, Mao was concerned with its radicalism, so in late 1967 the group was outlawed on conspiracy and anarchism charges, followed by the arrest of most Cultural Revolution Group members (except Jiang Qing). A nationwide campaign was later launched to liquidate "May Sixteenth Elements", which ironically created more chaos and anarchy.

Countless innocent people were accused of being "May Sixteenth elements" and ruthlessly persecuted. According to one source, in the province of Jiangsu alone, more than 130,000 "May Sixteenth elements" were "ferreted out" and more than 6000 either died or suffered permanent injuries.
