= Wuhan incident =

1967 armed conflict in China

- 七二零事件; Part of the Violent Struggle
- Anti-Chen propaganda poster published by the Wuhan Iron and Steel Corporation in 1967
- Date: 16–25 July 1967
- Location: Wuhan, Hubei, People's Republic of China
- Methods: Propaganda, rallies, hunger strikes, armed clashes
- Result: Workers' Headquarters victory

Parties
Million Heroes; Local PLA units, chiefly Unit 8201	Wuhan Workers' Headquarters; Other Red Guards; Support: PLA Navy; PLA Air Force; Cultural Revolution Group

Lead figures
Chen Zaidao	No centralized leadership; Wang Li; Xie Fuzhi; Yu Lijin

Number
about 500,000	about 500,000

Casualties and losses
- about 1,000 killed; tens of thousands injured; thousands detained by Chen's forces

The Wuhan incident (Chinese: 七二零事件; pinyin: Qī èrlíng shìjiàn; lit. 'July 20th Incident') was an armed conflict in the People's Republic of China between two hostile groups who were fighting for control over the city of Wuhan in July 1967, at the height of the Cultural Revolution.

The two opposing groups were the "Million Heroes" (Chinese: 百万雄师; pinyin: Bǎi wàn xióngshī) and the more radical "Workers' Headquarters" (Chinese: 工人总部; pinyin: Gōngrén zǒngbù). The former, numbering about 500,000 people, comprised mainly skilled workers, state and local party employees, and were supported by the local People's Liberation Army forces, led by the commander of Wuhan Military Region, General Chen Zaidao. The Workers' Headquarters and its allies, also numbering close to 500,000 people, comprised mostly workers and students from Red Guard organizations and whose leaders had been in prison since the February Countercurrent.

Both sides engaged in an extensive propaganda war in an attempt to enlist proletarian grassroots support. Central authorities in Beijing eventually endorsed the Workers' Headquarters faction as the "true" revolutionary group and reprimanded Chen Zaidao for his military support to Million Heroes. The event was considered a pivotal turning point in the Cultural Revolution: it marked the first time military leaders refused to carry out orders given by the central authorities and the Cultural Revolution Group in particular. Fears of a more widespread PLA revolt led Mao and his core associates to scale back the movement's most radical components.

== Background ==
All over China during the Cultural Revolution, provincial and municipal governments were replaced by organizations known as Revolutionary Committees (alliances of cadres, soldiers and student/worker groups) to take charge of governing the country and cleansing it from "counterrevolutionary forces" and "reactionary elements". With orders from the top leadership to "find and capture those in power walking the capitalist road," almost all incumbent party and government officials became vulnerable to attacks from Red Guard organizations - not owing to their ideological disposition but solely as a result of their incumbency. However, "capitalist roader" was a nebulous label that could be liberally applied to anyone perceived to be counter to the revolutionary spirit. Various mass organizations around the country took advantage of this chaotic backdrop and seized the opportunity to overthrow incumbent power figures with whom they may have carried other, unrelated grievances. In the central industrial city of Wuhan, two groups largely coalesced around those who wanted to preserve the incumbent political order in the city and those who wanted to overthrow it.

The Workers' Headquarters arose out of a union of local Red Guard youth and various "revolutionary" workers organizations from Wuhan's numerous steel plants. On January 27, 1967, they attempted to lay siege to the Wuhan party organization and the municipal government and then seize power in the city themselves, much in the fashion of the Shanghai People's Commune. However, incumbent interests rallied ordinary residents against the action and the takeover ultimately failed. It was thereafter branded as a "counterrevolutionary incident". In February, more than 1000 radicals were detained, some of whom were imprisoned while others were released after making public confessions.

In March 1967, local PLA units under the command of General Chen Zaidao forcefully disbanded the Workers' Headquarters faction and detained some 500 of its leaders. At the same time, it had been funding its own "revolutionary mass organization", dubbed "The Million Heroes," drawn from a wider cross-section of conservative interests in the city. The Million Heroes, whose slogans were also broadly "revolutionary" in tone, were mainly intent on maintaining the status quo. Their position was that, in essence, the existing Wuhan political establishment was loyally adhering to the Cultural Revolution's main programme and therefore should not have been a target for struggle.

Central authorities in Beijing did not issue any public statements on the March 1967 actions taken by the PLA against the Workers' Headquarters faction; privately the Cultural Revolution Group (CRG) griped about the direction of the movement in Wuhan, but stopped short of issuing a rebuke to Wuhan's PLA leaders. Instead, they attempted to pull Chen Zaidao aside from a top-level military conference in Beijing in April and prod him into admitting that some of the March actions had gone too far and acknowledge that the local PLA may have made "mistakes" in their handling of the situation. Chen, however, refused to stand down, and insisted on the general correctness of the PLA's actions.

== Conflict ==
Tensions grew in Wuhan through April as the Worker's Headquarters faction carried out hunger strikes and conducted rallies denouncing repression by Chen's forces; meanwhile, the Million Heroes accused the Workers' Headquarters of subverting the revolution by not properly adhering to the campaign to denounce Liu Shaoqi and Deng Xiaoping. Amid the growing hostilities, the central leadership felt a greater urgency to respond and issue interpretation of events on the ground. With approval from Mao Zedong, Zhou Enlai issued an order to Chen to withdraw support to the Million Heroes. The directive asserted that the Wuhan military had made a mistake in "general orientation" in carrying out Cultural Revolution policies - that it must publicly admit that its March actions against Workers' Headquarters were incorrect. The directive also labelled the Million Heroes as a "conservative organization" and the Workers' Headquarters a "revolutionary organization"; this was, in effect, the Centre throwing its weight behind the latter.

In the worst outbreak of violence that ensued, more than 70 people were killed on June 23 and 24 alone and some 3,000 wounded.

Minister of Public Security Xie Fuzhi and leading propagandist Wang Li arrived on July 16 and immediately ordered General Chen to withdraw support from the Million Heroes and instead extend it to the Workers' Headquarters. Mao himself also traveled to the city secretly, staying at the East Lake Guest House, whereby security was tightened to the point that the entire staff at the Guest House was changed on the eve of his arrival.

On July 18, after two days of talks, Mao concluded that Chen had committed errors and must write a self-criticism while retaining his command. Mao stated that the Workers' Headquarters should be regarded as the core group of the "Left" while the Million Heroes should be encouraged to unite with them, on the basis that both groups were workers and should not have any fundamental conflict of interest. Chen seemed to be swayed by Mao's verdict in Wuhan and acquiesced. Wang Li then gathered some 200 divisional officers at an impromptu conference and reprimanded them for failing to grasp the essence of the Cultural Revolution. His speech apparently drew particular ire with the military brass due to its condescending tone.

The more detailed order, relayed through Xie to a gathering of the PLA leadership in Wuhan on July 19, could not be implemented; several of Chen Zaidao's units refused to carry out the order. Moreover, a significant sub-section of the city lent support to the Million Heroes, making their position a formidable one. Generally, Million Heroes supporters saw their being labelled a "conservative" organization as lending rival groups ammunition to attack them. The local PLA organization, too, felt that if they were to accede to the order, it would be an implicit admission that they had committed a grave error which could be used to attack them in the future.

The Million Heroes were disturbed by the orders and blamed Xie and Wang. On the morning of July 20, supported by members of Chen's Unit 8201, they occupied all of Wuhan's transport infrastructure and key buildings. Thousands of agitators commandeered and drove convoys of army lorries and fire trucks to the Military regional headquarters to protest. A battalion of Unit 8201 surrounded the East Lake Guest House, while Chen refused to intervene. They locked Xie Fuzhi in his room and captured Wang Li for a struggle session at which he was severely beaten with one of his legs broken.

Mao had to be flown out to Shanghai, breaking the rule that had been imposed by the Politburo since 1959 that forbade Mao to travel by air for fear of an accident. In a last attempt to resolve the crisis, Zhou Enlai himself secretly flew to Wuhan on July 20; for his own safety, Zhou landed at a nearby airstrip controlled by the PLA Air Force, a branch of the military loyal to Lin Biao.

The naval forces stationed at Wuhan made a statement on the afternoon of July 20 denouncing the Million Heroes' actions and Chen's involvement. Another army unit demanded that Wang and Xie be handed over, to which Unit 8201 yielded, but they were still not released as both units wanted the directive withdrawn. In response, leftist forces took the offensive, occupied part of the city and arrested the provisional revolutionary committee. The PLA Air Force, fearing civil war, took the side of Wang and Xie on July 22 and secured their release. Members of the Million Heroes discovered where Wang and Xie were hiding but Air Force commander Wu Faxian helped them escape through the woods. They returned to Beijing on 25 July, to a hero's welcome, supposedly having saved the city from "counter-revolutionary" rebellion. A film of their return, showing Jiang Qing supporting the two off the plane as Wang staggered with a visible black eye, was distributed. Jean Esmein writes that the aim of releasing the short film was "to show that the Centre was united" and "to bolster the determination of Rebels suffering in the provinces by showing them the strength of the revolution in the big cities", as it also showed "enormous" demonstrations in Beijing against Chen Zaidao and a mass meeting of the armed forces in Shanghai discussing the events.

However, in the following days the unrest in Wuhan continued with reportedly hundreds of thousands of Million Heroes supporters parading through the city in a show of strength, calling for the dismissal of Wang Li and Xie Fuzhi and the overthrow of the Cultural Revolution Group. Fighting continued and it has been estimated that about one thousand people were killed, and tens of thousands more injured, in Wuhan during the July 1967 troubles in the city. In the province as a whole, 184,000 people were seized, beaten, maimed or killed.

== Aftermath ==
On July 26, Chen Zaidao was taken to Beijing's PLA-controlled Jingxi Hotel for a "show trial" and was subsequently dismissed from his post, along with his political commissar who has been named variously as Zhong Hanhua or Wang Renzhong. At the hotel, Wu Faxian and Xie Fuzhi accused Chen of a litany of crimes. Chen was also beaten by security personnel during the session. Leftists in the PLA were not satisfied with dismissals, as expressed in a People's Daily opinion piece on July 22 which called for those responsible to be "completely overthrown politically and ideologically, as well as organisationally". Mao Zedong privately disagreed, arguing that if Chen had wanted a rebellion, he would not have permitted Mao to leave. Chen was later rehabilitated.

The State Council, Central Committee, Central Military Commission and CRG issued a five-point joint letter to the Wuhan PLA command. This was answered on July 31 with a notice published in People's Daily and a letter of self-criticism from the new political commissar Liu Feng, on behalf of the troops, published in the Xinhua News Agency bulletin Today's News Chinese: 今日新闻. On August 1, the Workers' Headquarters broadcast an urgent appeal for an end to the violence.

Following the incident, Jiang Qing, in a speech to Red Guard organizations in Henan province, introduced the idea of "use words to attack but use arms to defend" (Chinese: 文攻武卫). These remarks were taken by rebel organizations around the country as an endorsement of armed struggle, and led to the escalation of violent factional clashes across the country. The ensuing violence, some of which were directed squarely at local PLA units, led Mao and his radical supporters to dial back their support for armed rebellion, likely due to their fears of a more widespread PLA reprisal. Wang Li and others continued to call for more drastic reorganization of the army; but Wang was arrested in August 1967, accused of having abused his position, instigated violence and plotted to replace Chen Yi as Foreign Minister.
