= Cultural Revolution Group =

Revolution group formed in 1966

Central Cultural Revolution Group
- 中央文化革命小组
- Formation: 28 May 1966
- Dissolved: 1969
- Type: Coordination organ
- Location: Beijing
- Leader: Chen Boda
- Senior Advisors: Kang Sheng, Tao Zhu
- Deputy Leaders: Jiang Qing, Wang Renzhong, Liu Zhijian, Zhang Chunqiao
- Parent organization: Politburo Standing Committee of the Chinese Communist Party

Cultural Revolution Group
- Simplified Chinese: 中央文化革命小组
Transcriptions
Standard Mandarin
- Hanyu Pinyin: Zhōngyāng Wénhuà Gémìng Xiǎozǔ

Alternative Chinese name
- Simplified Chinese: 中央文革小组
Transcriptions
Standard Mandarin
- Hanyu Pinyin: Zhōngyāng Wéngé Xiǎozǔ

Second alternative Chinese name
- Simplified Chinese: 中央文革
Transcriptions
Standard Mandarin
- Hanyu Pinyin: Zhōngyāng wéngé

The Central Cultural Revolution Group (CRG or CCRG; Chinese: 中央文革小组; pinyin: Zhōngyāng Wéngé Xiǎozǔ) was formed in May 1966 as a replacement organisation to the Secretariat of the Chinese Communist Party and the Five Man Group, and was initially directly responsible to the Politburo Standing Committee of the Chinese Communist Party. It consisted mainly of radical supporters of Mao, including Chen Boda, the chairman's wife Jiang Qing, Kang Sheng, Yao Wenyuan, Zhang Chunqiao, Wang Li and Xie Fuzhi. The CRG played a central role in the Cultural Revolution's first few years, and for a period of time the group replaced the Politburo Standing Committee (PSC) as the de facto top power organ of China. Its members were also involved in many of the major events of the Cultural Revolution.

== Background ==
In January 1965, at a meeting of the Politburo, Mao Zedong called on the leaders of the Chinese Communist Party (CCP) to implement a "Cultural Revolution" in China. (The Oxford English Dictionary traces the English-language phrase "cultural revolution" (defined as "a sudden change in the culture of a people or society") as far back as 1929.) The meeting established a body known as the "Five Man Group" (chaired by Peng Zhen, the fifth-ranking member of the Politburo), with the aim of overseeing the beginnings of the Cultural Revolution. Of the members of the group, only Kang Sheng was a supporter of Mao. However, the group remained relatively inactive until the spring of 1966, when it censored the writings of Yao Wenyuan and of other radicals for making an academic debate on the play Hai Rui Dismissed from Office into a political one (a move which Mao had started encouraging).

Unhappy over what he perceived to be an obstruction of the course of the Cultural Revolution, Mao returned to the capital in the spring of 1966, and the CCP Central Committee formally announced the dissolution of the "Five Man Group" in its May 16 Circular:

The Central Committee has decided to... dissolve the 'Group of Five in Charge of the Cultural Revolution', and to set up a new Cultural Revolution group directly under the Standing Committee of the Political Bureau.

The "Five Man Group" was dissolved immediately and Peng Zhen faced charges of allegedly obstructing the course of the Cultural Revolution. Soon after May 16 he was dismissed from all his offices and the control of the capital passed into the hands of followers of Mao. Chen Boda was selected by Chairman Mao to head the newly formed "Cultural Revolution Group", which would report to the Politburo Standing Committee. Consisting originally of between fifteen and twenty people, the CRG included, amongst others, Jiang Qing (the wife of Chairman Mao) as vice-chairman, Kang Sheng as the Group Adviser, Yao Wenyuan, Zhang Chunqiao, Qi Benyu, Wang Li and Xie Fuzhi. There were also several less well-known members. However, Chen Boda did not chair the CRG's meetings - that task fell to Zhou Enlai, who held a position of control over the group, and could speak on behalf of the entire group without needing to consult it.

== Role in the Cultural Revolution ==
The mandate given to the CRG on its formation was to guide the Cultural Revolution, and it was given many of the powers and the political prestige of the Central Committee and the Politburo. For example, when the order, on 5 September 1967, was issued instructing the People's Liberation Army (PLA) to restore order to China, it was signed by the CRG as well as the Central Committee, the State Council and the Military Affairs Commission. In addition, the CRG had theoretical control over the People's Liberation Army, although very soon army commanders wielded enough political power to often act independently of the CRG. The CRG was also given the entire Diaoyutai compound in Beijing to use at its offices. All documents from Mao were sent for approval to the CRG (as well as Lin Biao and Zhou Enlai), while other members of the Politburo Standing Committee were not sent these documents. Gradually, through examples like this, the CRG began to overtake the PSC in its political stature and importance.

Throughout the early years of the Cultural Revolution, the CRG acted as a body that directed the course the movement should take. Due to Mao's backing of the group, its orders were of significant importance. For example, after the Wuhan Incident, Jiang Qing suggested in a speech that the Red Guards should 'defend with weapons', leading to a surge in the seizure of PLA armaments by rebel groups. In addition, Wang Li and other CRG radicals (taking their cue from Jiang Qing) called for the removal of 'revisionist' elements in the PLA. The radical CRG, however, often found it had to contend with the more conservative view of how the Cultural Revolution should progress promoted by Zhou Enlai and his supporters, who were as interested in stability and the maintenance of some form of government as they were in revolution.

The CRG also had several supplementary functions. Its Art and Literature Group, headed by Jiang Qing, took over the responsibilities of the Ministry of Culture when the latter was dissolved in May 1967. Furthermore, the group worked closely with the Central Case Examination Group (CCEG), an organisation established in 1966 that investigated the alleged crimes and errors of higher-ranking members of the Party. Practically all the members of the CRG were also members of the CCEG.

The members of the CRG also had important individual roles in two of the important events of the Cultural Revolution, the Shanghai Commune and the Wuhan Incident.

=== The Shanghai Commune ===
Two members of the CRG played a significant part in the affair over the Shanghai Commune. Due to his connections with the city (he had been secretary of the Shanghai Party Committee until July 1966), Zhang Chunqiao was dispatched from the centre in November 1966 to mediate the crisis over the siege of some worker's groups at Anting. Early in January the next year, Zhang Chunqiao was to return again to Shanghai with his CRG colleague Yao Wenyuan to lead the new order established after the fall of the old Party apparatus, and in early February he was to become head of the newly formed Shanghai Commune. However, the combination of questions over the legitimacy of the Commune's leadership, and a change in attitudes to communes in general at the centre, meant that the Shanghai Commune was to last less than a month.

=== The Wuhan Incident ===
Despite the CRG's 1967 orders forbidding violence, in July 1967 the city of Wuhan became a battleground for two large rival rebel groups - the Million Heroes and the Wuhan Workers' General Headquarters (WWGH). The 400,000 strong WWGH was besieged by the Million Heroes, who were being supplied with weapons and manpower by the local PLA commander Chen Zaidao. When Chen ignored Zhou Enlai's orders that the siege was to be lifted, Wang Li and Xie Fuzhi were dispatched to Wuhan to resolve the crisis. On 19 July the pair instructed the PLA to switch its support from the Million Heroes to the WWGH. In the early hours of the next day however, Xie Fuzhi was arrested by the PLA while Wang Li was kidnapped by the Million Heroes and beaten. After a failed attempt by Zhou Enlai to resolve the crisis, it took a show of military force by other PLA units for Chen Zaidao to eventually surrender.

== Fall of the Cultural Revolution Group ==
The first two years of the Cultural Revolution witnessed a continued growth in tensions between the People's Liberation Army and the CRG, due to the PLA's gradual suppression of the CRG-backed rebel groups and Red Guards. By October 1967, the PLA had reached the peak of its ascendancy, which meant the end of the CRG. In November 1967, the Group's radical party journal, Red Flag, was ordered to stop publication. In addition, the leading members of the CRG quickly became scapegoats for the problems of the summer of 1967, when armed conflict between rebel groups, other groups and the PLA had been the norm. Individuals including Wang Li were soon connected with the "May Sixteenth Corps", a supposed group that exploited divisions in the Cultural Revolution to cause the anarchy and was plotting to seize power. Although there is evidence that Wang Li and others formed a faction within the CRG that employed the term "May Sixteenth", and that the CRG did exploit divisions in the movement, there is little evidence known to suggest a plot to seize power.

The fall of the CRG has also been attributed by some to the fact that Mao had become increasingly moderate in his view of the Cultural Revolution since February 1967, and that others (like the CRG) who were still committed to the original aims of the movement remained exposed on the left-wing while Mao moved towards the centre. Comparably, they were now far enough on the left to be considered too radical for comfort.

In September, some of the CRG radicals including Wang Li and Guan Feng were arrested on the orders of Mao, but by the end of the Cultural Revolution the new drive to eradicate 'ultra-leftists' would see the arrest of nearly all of the CRG's members (Jiang Qing would survive until the death of Mao).

After the 1967 arrest of some of its leading members, the CRG continued to play a role in the Cultural Revolution, but this was limited. For example, the remaining members were asked to attend the Twelfth Plenum of the Eighth Central Committee in October 1968, where Liu Shaoqi was officially expelled from the CCP. The group was never formally dissolved, but ceased to exist at some point after the CCP's Ninth Congress in the Spring of 1969. The CRG's remaining former members - including Jiang Qing and Kang Sheng - were left to fight their individual political battles in the years that followed.
