= Red Guards =

1966–1968 social movement in China

- Calligraphy of the characters " 红衛兵", commonly painted on arm bands during the Cultural Revolution
- Founder: Chairman Mao Zedong
- Leaders: Gang of Four and Cultural Revolution Group (until 1968)
- Founded: 1966
- Dissolved: 1968
- Country: China
- Allegiance: Mao Zedong (ceremonial figurehead)
- Active regions: Throughout much of China, particularly in Beijing and other urban areas
- Ideology: Maoism
- Political position: Far-left
- Status: Forcefully suppressed by the PLA
- Size: 11 to 12 million high school and university students, among other followers or supporters

Red Guards
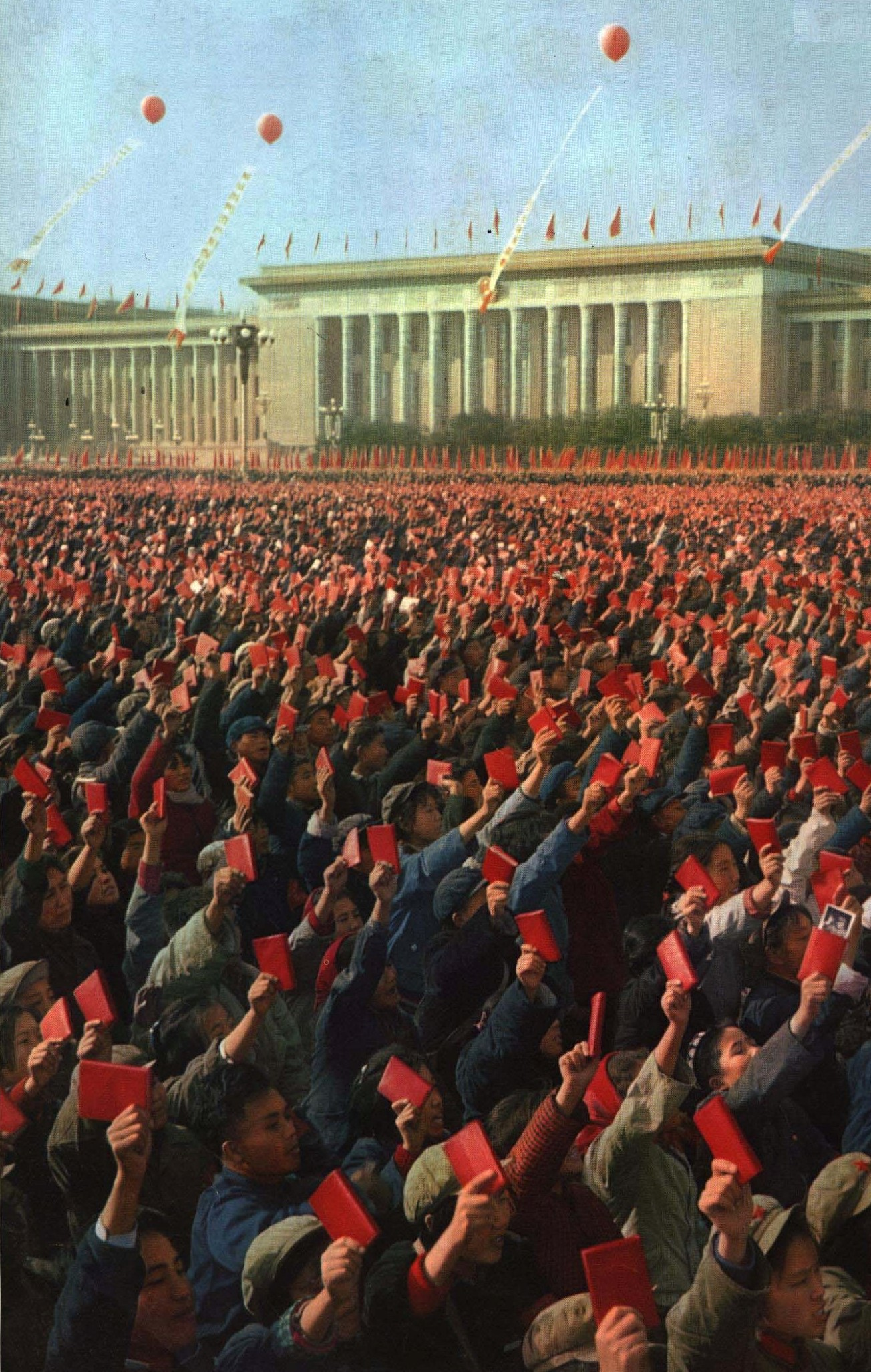
- Red Guards on Tiananmen Square in Beijing. They were holding the Little Red Book containing quotations from Mao Zedong.
- Simplified Chinese: 红卫兵
- Traditional Chinese: 紅衛兵
- Hanyu Pinyin: Hóngwèibīng
Transcriptions
Standard Mandarin
- Hanyu Pinyin: Hóngwèibīng
- Wade–Giles: Hung^{2}-wei^{4}-ping^{1}
Yue: Cantonese
- Jyutping: Hung^{4}wai^{6}bing^{1}

The Red Guards (Chinese: 红卫兵; pinyin: hóng wèibīng) were a mass, student-led, paramilitary social movement mobilized by Chairman Mao Zedong in 1966 until their abolition in 1968, during the first phase of the Cultural Revolution, which he had instituted.

According to a Red Guard leader, the movement's aims were as follows:

Chairman Mao has defined our future as an armed revolutionary youth organization .... So if Chairman Mao is our Red-Commander-in-Chief and we are his Red Guards, who can stop us? First we will make China Maoist from inside out and then we will help the working people of other countries make the world red ... and then the whole universe.

Despite meeting with resistance early on, the Red Guards received personal support from Mao, and the movement rapidly grew. The movement in Beijing culminated during the Red August of 1966, which later spread to other areas in mainland China. Mao made use of the group as propaganda and to accomplish goals such as seizing power and destroying symbols of China's pre-communist past, including ancient artifacts and gravesites of notable Chinese figures. Moreover, the government was very permissive of the Red Guards, and even allowed the Red Guards to inflict bodily harm on people viewed as dissidents. The movement quickly grew out of control. Factions within the Red Guards frequently criticized one another showing that divisions amongst each other was a defining feature of the movement's development. The Red Guard had frequently come into conflict with authority and threatening public security until the government made efforts to rein the youths in, with even Mao himself finding the leftist students to have become too radical. By the end of 1968, the group as a formal movement had dissolved with many of the red guards sent to rural areas and country side due to the Down to the Countryside Movement.

== Origins ==
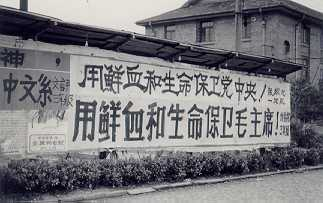
Political slogan by Red Guards on the campus of Fudan University, Shanghai, China says "Defend Central Committee with (our) blood and life! Defend Chairman Mao with (our) blood and life!"

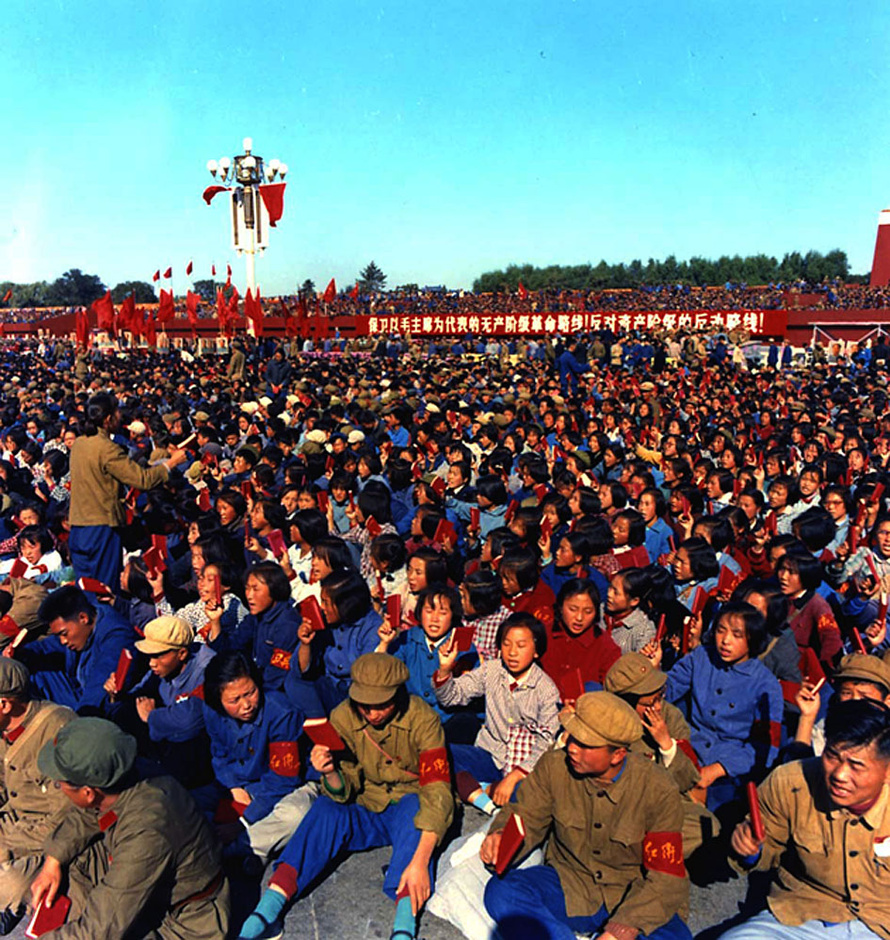
Red Guards in 1966

The first students to call themselves "Red Guards" in China were from the Tsinghua University High School. The students used the name to sign two big-character posters issued on 25 May – 2 June 1966. The students believed that the criticism of the play Hai Rui Dismissed from Office was a political issue and needed greater attention. The group of students – led by Zhang Chengzhi at Tsinghua Middle School and Nie Yuanzi at Peking University – originally wrote the posters as a constructive criticism of Tsinghua University and Peking University's administrations, who were accused of harbouring intellectual elitism and bourgeois tendencies. Most of the early Red Guards came from the Five Red Categories.

The Red Guards were denounced as counter-revolutionaries and radicals by the school administration and by fellow students and were forced to secretly meet amongst the ruins of the Old Summer Palace. Nevertheless, Chairman Mao Zedong ordered that the manifesto of the Red Guards be broadcast on national radio and published in the People's Daily newspaper. This action gave the Red Guards political legitimacy, and student groups quickly began to appear across China. By the end of August 1966, almost every Chinese city and a majority of counties had Red Guard activity. Eighty-five percent of counties had local Red Guard activity by October 1966. According to sociologist Andrew G. Walder, "These figures represent a remarkable level of popular political mobilization. At no point in the previous history of the regime were ordinary citizens permitted, much less encouraged, to form independent political organizations."

Due to the factionalism already emerging in the Red Guard movement, President Liu Shaoqi made the decision in early June 1966 to send in Chinese Communist Party (CCP) work teams. These workgroups were led by Zhang Chunqiao, head of China's Propaganda Department, in an attempt by the Party to keep the movement under control. Rival Red Guard groups led by the sons and daughters of cadres were formed by these work teams to deflect attacks from those in positions of power towards bourgeois elements in society, mainly intellectuals. In addition, these Party-backed rebel groups also attacked students with 'bad' class backgrounds, including children of former landlords and capitalists. These actions were all attempts by the CCP to preserve the existing state government and apparatus.

Mao, concerned that these work teams were hindering the course of the Cultural Revolution, dispatched Chen Boda, Jiang Qing, Kang Sheng, and others to join the Red Guards and combat the work teams. In July 1966, Mao ordered the removal of the remaining work teams (against the wishes of Liu Shaoqi) and condemned their 'Fifty Days of White Terror', a label referencing the period of time the work teams were active. The Red Guards were then free to organize without the restrictions of the Party and, within a few weeks, on the encouragement of Mao's supporters, Red Guard groups had appeared in almost every school in China.

Mao had multiple reasons for supporting the Red Guards' activities, the primary one being his wish to undermine Liu Shaoqi, with whom he grew increasingly distrustful. Furthermore, Mao intended to make the revolutionary ideals more ingrained in the Chinese youth, as a way to harden their spirit and combat traditional scholarly education.

Chiang Kai-Shek believed Mao lost trust in CCP officials and members, Communist Youth League of China (CYLC) members, and even workers, peasants and soldiers, so he had put faith in the students, and made use of the Red Guards to preserve his authority, Chiang also believed Mao started the massive purge among knowledgeable and contributive CCP officials and members and CYLC members in the name of Maoism, let Red Guards replace them to inherit the party.

== During the Cultural Revolution ==
=== Red August ===
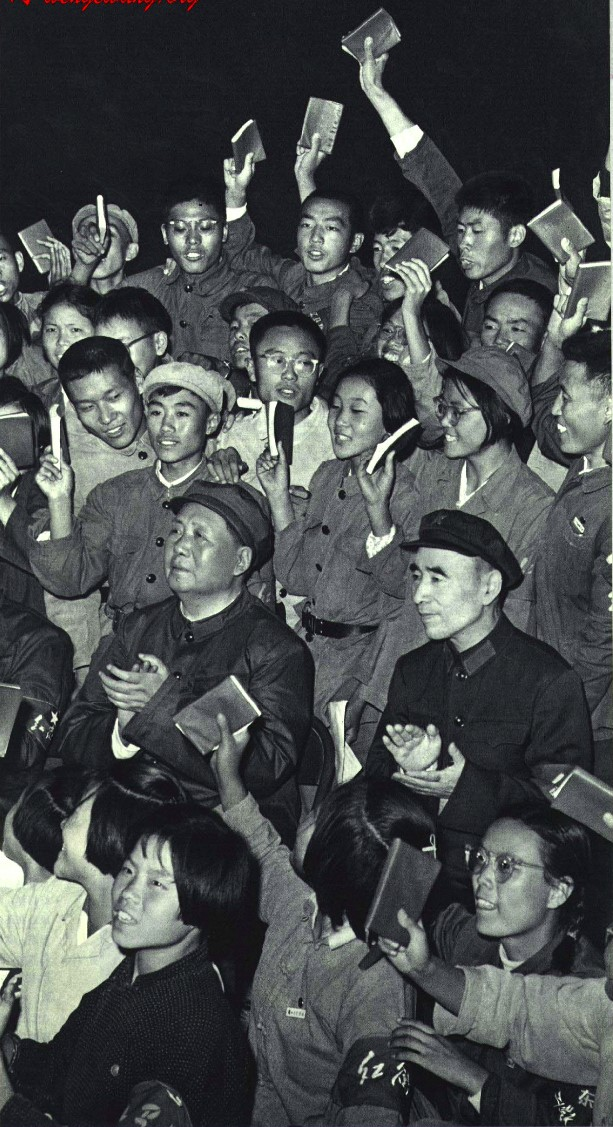
A public appearance of Chairman Mao and Lin Biao among Red Guards, in Beijing, during the Cultural Revolution (November 1966)

Mao Zedong expressed personal approval and support for the Red Guards in a letter to the Tsinghua University High School Red Guards on 1 August 1966. During the Red August of Beijing, Mao gave the movement a public boost at a massive rally on 18 August at Tiananmen Square. Mao appeared atop Tiananmen wearing an olive green military uniform, the type favored by Red Guards, but which he had not worn in many years. He personally greeted 1,500 Red Guards and waved to 800,000 Red Guards and onlookers below.

The rally was led by Chen Boda and Lin Biao gave a keynote speech. Red Guard leaders, led by Nie Yuanzi, also gave speeches. A high school Red Guard leader, Song Binbin, placed a red armband inscribed with the characters for "Red Guard" on the chairman, who stood for six hours. The 8-18 Rally, as it was known, was the first of eight receptions the Chairman gave to Red Guards in Tiananmen in the fall of 1966. It was this rally that signified the beginning of the Red Guards' involvement in implementing the aims of the Cultural Revolution.

A second rally, held on 31 August, was led by Kang Sheng and Marshal Lin Biao also donned a red arm band. The last rally was held on 26 November 1966. In all, the chairman greeted eleven to twelve million Red Guards, most of whom traveled from afar to attend the rallies including one held on National Day 1966, which included the usual civil-military parade.

During Red August, large number of members of "Five Black Categories" were persecuted and even killed. Mao had originally instructed the People's Liberation Army (PLA) not to interfere against the Red Guards' violence, by vaguely ordering the army to 'support the left'.

=== Attacks upon the "Four Olds" ===
In August 1966, the 11th Plenum of the CCP Central Committee had ratified the 'Sixteen Articles', a document that stated the aims of the Cultural Revolution and the role students would be asked to play in the movement. After the 18 August rally, the Cultural Revolution Group directed the Red Guards to attack the 'Four Olds' of Chinese society (i.e., old customs, old culture, old habits, and old ideas). For the rest of the year, Red Guards marched across China in a campaign to eradicate the 'Four Olds'. Old books and art were destroyed, museums were ransacked, and streets were renamed with new revolutionary names, adorned with pictures and the sayings of Mao. Many famous temples, shrines, and other heritage sites in Beijing were attacked.

The Cemetery of Confucius was attacked in November 1966 by a team of Red Guards from Beijing Normal University, led by Tan Houlan. The corpse of the 76th-generation Duke Yansheng was removed from its grave and hung naked from a tree in front of the palace during the desecration of the cemetery.

Attacks on other cultural and historic sites occurred between 1966 and 1967. One of the greater damages was to the Ming Dynasty Tomb of the Wanli Emperor in which his and the empress' corpses, along with a variety of artifacts from the tomb, were destroyed by student members of the Red Guard. During the assault on Confucius' tombs alone, more than 6,618 historic Chinese artifacts were destroyed in the desire to achieve the goals of the Cultural Revolution.

Individual property was also targeted by Red Guard members if it was considered to represent one of the Four Olds. Commonly, religious texts and figures would be confiscated and burned. In other instances, items of historic importance would be left in place, but defaced, with examples such as Qin Dynasty scrolls having their writings partially removed, and stone and wood carvings having the faces and words carved out of them.

Re-education came alongside the destruction of previous culture and history; throughout the Cultural Revolution schools were a target of Red Guard groups to teach both the new ideas of the Cultural Revolution as well as to point out what ideas represented the previous era idealizing the Four Olds. For example, one student, Mo Bo, described a variety of the Red Guards activities taken to teach the next generation what was no longer the norms. This was done according to Bo with wall posters lining the walls of schools pointing out workers who undertook "bourgeois" lifestyles. These actions inspired other students across China to join the Red Guard as well. One of these very people, Rae Yang, described how these actions inspired students. Through authority figures, such as teachers, using their positions as a form of absolute command rather than as educators, gave students a reason to believe Red Guard messages. In Yang's case it is exemplified through a teacher using a poorly phrased statement as an excuse to shame a student to legitimize the teacher's own position.

==== Murder and oppression ====
Attacks on culture quickly descended into attacks on people. Ignoring guidelines in the 'Sixteen Articles' which stipulated that persuasion rather than force were to be used to bring about the Cultural Revolution, officials in positions of authority and perceived 'bourgeois elements' were denounced and suffered physical and psychological attacks. On 22 August 1966, a central directive was issued to stop police intervention in Red Guard activities. Those in the police force who defied this notice were labeled "counter-revolutionaries." Mao's praise for rebellion effectively endorsed the actions of the Red Guards, which grew increasingly violent.

Public security in China deteriorated rapidly as a result of central officials lifting restraints on violent behavior. Xie Fuzhi, the national police chief, said it was "no big deal" if Red Guards were beating "bad people" to death. The police relayed Xie's remarks to the Red Guards and they acted accordingly. In the course of about two weeks, the violence left some 100 teachers, school officials, and educated cadres dead in Beijing's western district alone. The number injured was "too large to be calculated."

The most gruesome aspects of the campaign included numerous incidents of torture, murder, and public humiliation. Many people who were targets of 'struggle' could no longer bear the stress and committed suicide. In August and September 1966, there were 1,772 people murdered in Beijing alone. In Shanghai, there were 704 suicides and 534 deaths related to the Cultural Revolution in September. In Wuhan, there were 62 suicides and 32 murders during the same period.

Intellectuals were to suffer the brunt of these attacks. Many were ousted from official posts such as university teaching, and allocated manual tasks such as "sweeping courtyards, building walls and cleaning toilets from 7am to 5pm" which would encourage them to dwell on past "mistakes." An official report in October 1966 stated that the Red Guards had already arrested 22,000 'counterrevolutionaries'.

The Red Guards were also tasked with rooting out 'capitalist roaders' (those with supposed 'right-wing' views) in positions of authority. This search was to extend to the very highest echelons of the CCP, with many top party officials, such as Liu Shaoqi, Deng Xiaoping and Peng Dehuai, being attacked both verbally and physically by the Red Guards. Liu Shaoqi was especially targeted, as he had taken Mao's seat as State Chairman (Chinese President) following the Great Leap Forward. Although Mao stepped down from his post as a sign of accepting responsibility, he was angered that Liu could take the reins of communist China.

=== Clashes with the PLA ===
The Red Guards were not completely unchallenged. They were not permitted to enter Zhongnanhai, the Forbidden City, or any military facility that was tasked with classified information (i.e. special intelligence, nuclear weapons development). Several times, Red Guards attempted to storm Zhongnanhai and the 8341 Special Regiment, which was responsible for Mao's security, fired upon them.

Jiang Qing promoted the idea that the Red Guards should "crush the PLA," with Marshal Lin Biao seemingly supportive of her plans (e.g., permitting Red Guards to loot barracks). At the same time, several military commanders, oblivious to the ongoing chaos that the People's Liberation Army (PLA) had to deal with, disregarded their chain of command and attacked Red Guards whenever their bases or people were threatened. When Red Guards entered factories and other areas of production, they encountered resistance in the form of worker and peasant groups who were keen to maintain the status quo. In addition, there were bitter divisions within the Red Guard movement itself, especially along social and political lines. The most radical students often found themselves in conflict with more conservative Red Guards.

The leadership in Beijing also simultaneously tried to restrain and encourage the Red Guards, adding confusion to an already chaotic situation. On the one hand, the Cultural Revolution Group reiterated calls for non-violence. On the other hand, the PLA was told to assist the Red Guards with transport and lodging, and assist in organizing their rallies within the capital. By the end of 1966, most of the Cultural Revolution Group were of the opinion that the Red Guards had become a political liability. The campaign against 'capitalist roaders' had led to anarchy, the Red Guards' actions had led to conservatism amongst China's workers, and the lack of discipline and the factionalism in the movement had made the Red Guards politically dangerous. 1967 would see the decision to dispel the student movement.

"Enveloped in a trance of excitement and change," all student Red Guards pledged their loyalty to Chairman Mao Zedong. Many worshipped Mao above everything and this was typical of a "pure and innocent generation," especially of a generation that was brought up under a Marxist party, which discouraged religion altogether. Mao quickly formed an army based on individual interpretations of Mao's statements. All groups pledged loyalty to Mao and claimed to have his best interests in mind, yet they continually engaged in verbal and physical skirmishes throughout the Cultural Revolution, proving that there was no core political foundation at work. These skirmishes were often violent, with rivaling groups obtaining both assault rifles and explosives, as well as utilizing forced imprisonments and widespread torture. This domestic anarchy continued until the second half of the Cultural Revolution, when the 9th Central Committee of the Chinese Communist Party started civil policies.

Youths from families with party-members and of revolutionary origin joined conservative factions. These factions focused on the socio-political status quo, keeping within their localities and working to challenge existing distributions of power and privilege. Those from the countryside and without ties to the CCP often joined radical groups who sought to change and uproot local government leadership. Among the disputes between Red Guard factions was the bloodline theory advocated by most conservative Red Guard groups in the early period of the Cultural Revolution. Under this political view, the issue of a good class background was a precondition for political participation. Students whose parents had been labeled right wing elements in 1957, for example, were not admitted in groups adhering to the bloodline theory. Although it was quickly politically discredited, the bloodline theory was highly influential and contentious among Red Guards in the early stages of the Cultural Revolution.

The primary goal of the radicals was to restructure existing political and social systems, as supposed "capitalist roaders" were corrupting the Socialist agenda. Primarily influenced by travel and a freer exchange of ideas from different regions of China, more joined the radical, rebel factions of the Red Guards by the second half of the Cultural Revolution.

Some historians, such as Andrew Walder, argue that individuals and their political choices also influenced the development of Red Guard factions across China. Interests of individuals, interactions with authority figures, and social interactions all altered identities to forge factions that would fight for new grievances against "the system".

=== Red Guard press ===
During the early period of the Cultural Revolution, independent publications by mass political organizations such as Red Guards grew, reaching an estimated number as high as 10,000. Publications were not uniform in style or form and ranged from mimeographed tabloids to newspapers printed with professional metal type in broadsheet format. The first Red Guard newspapers, Red Guard News (红卫兵报; Hongweibing bao) and Red Guard (红卫兵; Hongweibing) were published on September 1, 1966.

Red Guard newspapers adopted standard journalistic practices such as publishing editorials and commentator articles, as well as reprinted articles from publications such as People's Daily. Red Guard newspapers contained many articles regarding big-character posters and their function within the information environment of the Cultural Revolution.

A small but significant group of the Red Guard press focused on press criticism. This subset of Red Guard newspapers criticized pre-Cultural Revolution practices and proposed new modes of journalism. For example, a group of journalists from the prestigious newspaper Guangming Daily founded a rebel newspaper called Guangming Battle Bulletin (光明战报; Guangming zhanbao) in which they denounced the press theories of Liu Shaoqi and argued that the proletarian press should be a tool of the dictatorship of the proletariat. Rebel workers at Xinhua News Agency also published newspapers in which they commented and reported on press issues.

Because of their grass roots nature and organic connection with the masses, the Red Guard press was able to exercise public oversight over the Party press.

== Factionalism and infighting ==
Factionalism was a defining feature of the Red Guard movement. From the movement's inception in 1966 to its decline and suppression in 1968, organized student groups split into factions that fought for control of schools, workplaces, and local governments. Factional divisions within the Red Guards frequently produced two opposing groups, often described as "radical" and "conservative" camps. For instance, in Beijing, the Red Guards split into the more conservative "Heaven" faction and the radical "Earth" faction, while the Guangdong Red Guards split into the conservative "Red Flag" and radical "East Wind" factions.

Despite factions being labelled "radical" and "conservative", ideological differences between factions were slight. Both the conservative and radical factions were loyal to Mao Zedong and the Chinese Communist Party. Factions framed their efforts as defending the Cultural Revolution against leaders they accused of betraying the cause. Opposing factions often shared similar political orientation and leadership structures, but disagreed on personalities and political tactics. Being conservative on one issue did not mean that an individual held a conservative position on another, and alliances frequently crossed factional lines.

In Zhejiang province, the conservative faction "Red Storm" and the rival radical faction "United Headquarters" shared a commitment to the Cultural Revolution but fought over leadership. The United Headquarters rallied against Jiang Hua, the First Secretary of the Zhejiang Provincial Committee, since they found him overtly capitalist. The Red Storm quelled the rally after learning that Mao planned to protect Jiang, which caused a rift between the factions. Over a period of two years, the conflict escalated between rival groups and led to instability in the province for most of the following decade.

In Wuhan, factionalism occurred in a more fragmented form. There were several radical factions, including the "Workers' Headquarters," "Second Headquarters," "17 August Corps," "Fragrant Flower Faction," and "Poisonous Weed Faction," as well as several conservative factions such as the "Million Heroes" and the pro-army factions, which rose and collapsed over the course of the Red Guard movement. In 1967, the conservative faction "Red Armed Guards" formed a major organization with 240,000 members, becoming one of Wuhan's largest factions. The radical factions responded by banding together into a united front to confront the powerful conservative force. The alliance proved unstable and soon deteriorated into open conflict, with rival factions fighting for control of the city, further contributing to disorder. As the Red Guard movement became more fragmented, divisions contributed to Wuhan's factional conflict.

The emergence of Red Guard factionalism has been linked to the intervention and subsequent withdrawal of CCP work teams in 1966. Work teams disrupted existing authority structures within schools and divided students based on their responses to them, producing lasting antagonisms among their members and followers. After the work teams were abruptly withdrawn in July 1966, students who had cooperated with them organized into conservative factions, while others formed rival radical groups.

By late 1967, conflicts within the Red Guards had escalated dramatically as each faction competed for influence and power. The violence intensified between factions as political and social consequences became more salient, and the state failed to mediate effectively. Conflicts expanded into large-scale clashes across cities and campuses as the Red Guards fought to retain power.

== Suppression ==
By February 1967, political opinion at the center had decided on the removal of the Red Guards from the Cultural Revolution scene in the interest of stability. The PLA forcibly suppressed the more radical Red Guard groups in Sichuan, Anhui, Hunan, Fujian, and Hubei provinces in February and March. Students were ordered to return to schools; student radicalism was branded 'counterrevolutionary' and banned. These groups, as well as many of their supporters, were later branded May Sixteenth elements after an ultra-left Red Guard organization based in Beijing.

May Sixteenth elements (五一六分子) were named after the so-called May Sixteenth Army Corps (五一六兵团; 1967–1968), ultra-left Red Guards in Beijing during the early years of the Cultural Revolution (1966–1976) who targeted Zhou Enlai with the backing of Jiang Qing. The name came from the historic May 16 Notice (五一六通知) which Mao Zedong partially wrote and edited, which triggered the revolution. However, Mao was concerned with its radicalism, so in late 1967 the group was outlawed on conspiracy and anarchism charges, followed by the arrest of many Cultural Revolution Group members (except Jiang Qing and other core members). Mao became increasingly frustrated with the Red Guards' perceived inability to cooperate, which was the ongoing cause of constant violence. This eventually led to chairman's decision to call on the PLA to reestablish order. A nationwide campaign was later launched to liquidate "May Sixteenth Elements", which created further chaos.

There was a wide backlash in the spring against the suppression, with student attacks on any symbol of authority and PLA units, but not on Marshal Lin Biao, the Minister of National Defense and one of the chairman's biggest allies. An order from Mao, the Cultural Revolution Group, the State Council, and the Central Military Affairs Committee of the PLA on 5 September 1967 instructed the PLA to restore order to China and end the chaos. The order came within months of incidents of PLA forces disobeying government and CRG orders during the summer (the most extreme case being the Wuhan incident, where the Wuhan Military Region under Chen Zaidao went further than cracking down on Red Guards to arrest the Minister of Public Security Xie Fuzhi), the aftermath of these resulted in even more violence amongst the Red Guards, even targeting local level PLA formations, raising fears of a repeat of the Wuhan events and other similar ones.

The PLA violently put down the national Red Guard movement in the year that followed, with the suppression often brutal. A radical alliance of Red Guard groups in Hunan province, called the Shengwulian, was involved in clashes with local PLA units, for example, and in the first half of 1968 was forcibly suppressed. At the same time, the PLA carried out mass executions of Red Guards in Guangxi province that were unprecedented in the Cultural Revolution.

The final remnants of the movement were defeated in Beijing in the summer of 1968. Allegedly, Mao had an audience with the Red Guard leaders, during which the chairman informed them of himself being directly responsible for the orders to suppress them, in favor of the military's administration. After the summer of 1968, some more radical students continued to travel across China and play an unofficial part in the Cultural Revolution, but by then the movement's official and substantial role was over.

== Scholarly interpretations ==
Several scholars have proposed explanations for Red Guard factionalism, debating whether divisions emerged from students' social backgrounds or from political processes during the Cultural Revolution. One early interpretation by political scientist Hong Yung Lee (1975) argues that the upheaval of the Cultural Revolution produced conservative and radical factional divisions that reflected conflicts between elite and mass participants. Competing political actors encouraged alliances among different student groups, creating factional divisions that cut across organizational and institutional boundaries. This interpretation primarily used publicly available materials, such as Red Guard publications, newspapers, monographs, and handbills.

Another line of scholarship emphasizes the role of family background and social class in creating factional divisions. In a 1980 article, historian Anita Chan, political scientist Stanley Rosen, and sociologist Jonathan Unger argue that antagonisms among students shaped factional membership, strategies, and interests. Their analysis drew from interviews with former Chinese students who emigrated to Hong Kong, local surveys, and Red Guard publications. It is also suggested that students' family origins played a more significant role in creating factional divisions than ideological disagreements during the Cultural Revolution.

Similarly, Rosen emphasized the importance of pre-existing social divisions in schools. Evidence from local surveys, factional and CCP publications, and interviews with former Chinese students living in Hong Kong is presented to show how tensions between class and family backgrounds shaped factional outcomes once the Cultural Revolution began. Rosen argues that students from "middle" or "bad" class backgrounds were more likely to join radical factions, whereas conservative factions were mostly composed of students from military families or revolutionary cadres.

Later scholarship has drawn on more primary accounts that have challenged these class-based explanations. Political sociologist Andrew G. Walder (2002) argues that personal interests and grievances, rather than social backgrounds, played the primary role in producing factions. A study of the Beijing Red Guards reconstructed the event sequences to show that the relationship between student background and factional affiliation became significant only after factions had already formed in late 1966, suggesting that social differences were reinforced by factional politics rather than causing them. Factional allegiances have been indicated as being determined by students' political choices to pursue individual interests. Walder argues that conservative factions formed around students who were aligned with and benefited from state institutions, while radical factions attracted those who were politically marginalized. In his later research, Walder (2019) further argued that factional alignments were shaped by shifting interactions among rival student groups, local authorities, and military organizations.

Other scholarship has highlighted the importance of student agency in the development of Red Guard factionalism. Historian Xiaowei Zheng (2006) argues that students actively interpreted and responded to changing political circumstances during the early stages of the Cultural Revolution. Zheng uses interviews with former Red Guard leaders and activists, along with a case study of Tsinghua University, to argue that factional divisions formed in response to students' political choices and were informed by their beliefs and experiences rather than class background. In this perspective, Red Guard factionalism was shaped by ideological commitment and students' efforts to define revolutionary legitimacy in an evolving political environment.

== Rustication ==
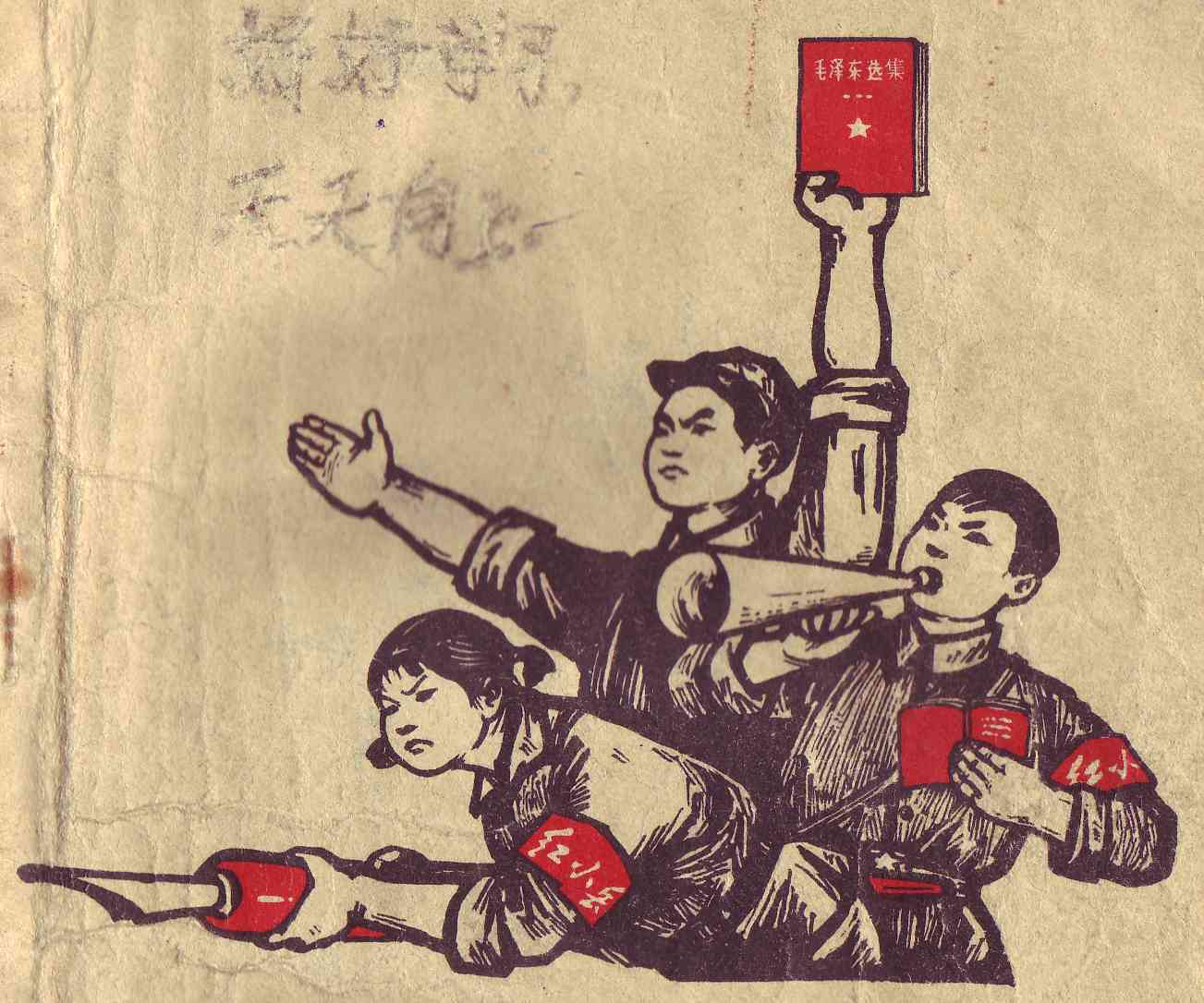
A 1971 propaganda poster depicting Red Guards

From 1962 to 1979, 16 to 18 million youths were sent to the countryside to undergo re-education.

Sending city students to the countryside was also used to defuse the student fanaticism set in motion by the Red Guards. On 22 December 1968, Chairman Mao directed the People's Daily to publish a piece entitled "We too have two hands, let us not laze about in the city", which quoted Mao as saying "The intellectual youth must go to the country, and be educated from living in rural poverty." In 1969 many youths were rusticated.

== Art ==
A Red Guard art movement developed, reaching its peak in 1967. Red Guards from fine arts academies organized large art exhibitions, often in cooperation with rebel groups in work units or the army, which included many amateur art works. The most significant Red Guard art exhibition was Long Live the Triumph of Chairman Mao's Revolutionary Line which opened 1 October 1967 in Beijing and featured more than 1,600 art works in a variety of media produced by artists and amateurs from around the country. Following the exhibition, traveling teams toured art works from the exhibition through rural China and into remote areas. The Red Guard art movement favored forms of art deemed public or anti-elitist, such as black and white woodcuts (or brush and marker illustrations in the style of a woodcut), satirical cartoons, paper cut outs, and forms of folk art. Among the most popular motifs in Red Guard art was the image of a worker, peasant, and soldier conducting criticism or Red Guards doing so. Red Guard groups in fine arts academies also published journals, pamphlets, and manifestos through which they criticized the old art institutions.

== Economic positions ==
Among the economic positions some Red Guards supported was the abolishment of interest.

The majority of the workers in the Shanghai branch of the People's Bank of China were Red Guards and they formed a group called the Anti-Economy Liaison Headquarters within the branch. The Anti-Economy Liaison Headquarters dismantled economic organizations in Shanghai, investigated bank withdrawals, and disrupted regular bank service in the city.

== Monuments ==
Due to the sensitive nature of this part of Chinese history, most Red Guard cemeteries were demolished prior to 2007. The Red Guard Cemetery in People's Park (人民公园) in Shapingba District, Chongqing commemorates a group of the Red Guard called the 815. The site was preserved through the efforts of Chongqing Party Secretary Liao Bokang in the 1980s. In December 2009 that cemetery was made the first Cultural Revolution relic to be formally recognized for its cultural heritage site.

== See also ==
- Little Red Guards
- Red August
- Violent struggle
- Seizure of power (Cultural Revolution)
- Gang of Four
- Morning Sun (film)
- Socialist Patriotic Youth League
- Quotations from Chairman Mao Tse-tung
- Little Pink, Red scarf
