= 16 May Notification =

Document initiating the Cultural Revolution

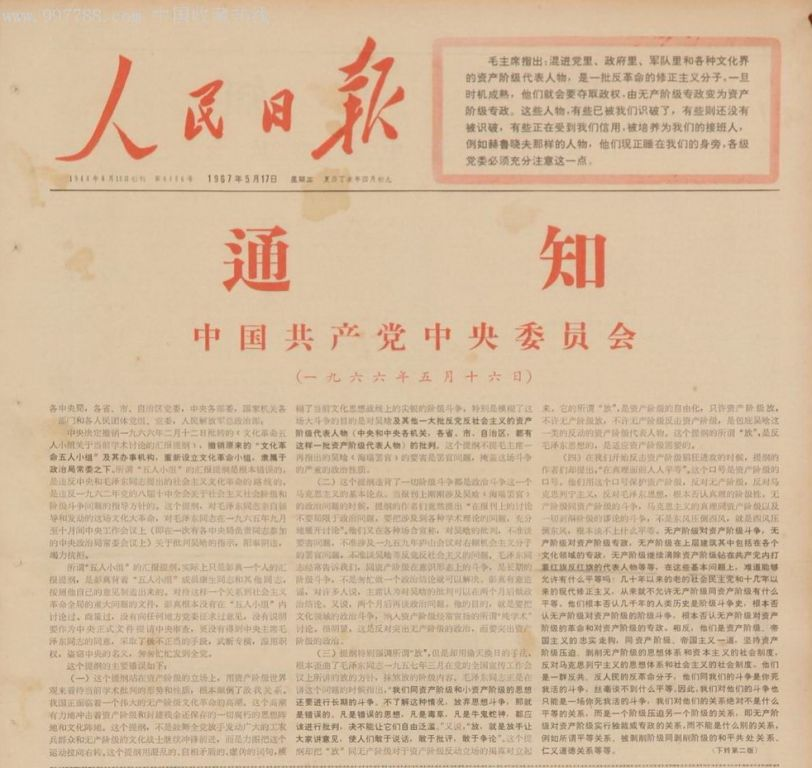
The 16 May Notification

The 16 May Notification (Chinese: 五一六通知; pinyin: Wǔyīliù Tōngzhī) or Circular of 16 May, originally titled simply Notification (通知; Tōngzhī), was the initial political declaration of the Cultural Revolution. Initially a secret inner-party document, it was issued at a May 1966 expanded session of the Politburo of the Chinese Communist Party. The notification ended a political dispute within the CCP stemming from the Beijing Opera play Hai Rui Dismissed from Office by dissolving the top level of the party's cultural apparatus and encouraging mass political movement to oppose rightists within the party. The result was a political victory for Mao Zedong. The Notification is often viewed as the beginning of the Cultural Revolution and would be declassified and published in People's Daily on 17 May 1967.

== Background ==
Beginning in 1965 and into spring 1966, a political dispute arose within the People's Republic of China regarding the Beijing Opera play Hai Rui Dismissed from Office. The play depicts an honest official of the Ming Dynasty named Hai Rui, who reverses unjust land verdicts on behalf of peasants who are portrayed passively and celebrate Hai Rui as their savior. Critics began to interpret the play as referencing Marshal Peng Dehuai's criticism of Mao Zedong and the peasant politics and policies of the Great Leap Forward at the Lushan Conference, which resulted in the political purging of Peng Dehuai. Politically aware Chinese understood Hai Rui to represent Peng Dehuai, the Ming Dynasty Emperor to represent Mao, and the unjust land verdicts to represent the Great Leap Forward policies.

Political figure and literary critic Yao Wenyuan began a scholarly and political debate about Hai Rui Dismissed from Office when he wrote an article critical of it at the request of close Mao allies Jiang Qing and Zhang Chunqiao. In particular, Yao's article argued that play's author Wu Han had distorted the historical record and that the aspect of reversing unjust land verdicts provided a focal point for "bourgeois opposition" who wanted "to demolish the people's communes and to restore the criminal rule of the landlords and rich peasants".

Beijing Mayor and high-ranking Politburo member Peng Zhen attempted to protect the author of the play, his subordinate and Beijing Vice Mayor Wu Han, by preventing republication of Yao's critical article. When the intervention of Zhou Enlai meant it was no longer politically feasible to prevent its publication, Peng Zhen used his leading role in the party's cultural apparatus via the Group of Five to restrict the terms of the debate over the play to censor any argument of contemporary political implications. At his direction, the Group of Five drafted a formal disciplinary code, the "Outline Report on the Current Academic Discussion", also known as the "February Outline"—intended to restrict the terms of the argument and thereby stop further articles comparing the play to contemporary political issues. The February Outline openly threatened the "obstinate Left" with discipline, urging that it bear in mind its "long-term behavior".

Mao opposed the February Outline, describing those who "prevent the publication of left-wing essays" as "great scholar-tyrants": a series of top-level party meetings from mid-March to mid-May addressed the controversy following the Outline and Mao response. In late April, the Central Committee decided to revoke the February Outline, disband the Group of Five, disband the Beijing Party Committee which Peng Zhen led, and disavow his handling of the Hai Rui Dismissed from Office controversy.

== The document ==
The notification formalized the decisions that had been reached in late April. It was the first major political declaration of the Cultural Revolution and summarized Mao's justifications for the Cultural Revolution. It emphasized the need to defeat bourgeois representatives in the party, government, and army.

By voiding the February Outline and dissolving the Group of Five, the 16 May Notification removed the leadership of the party's cultural apparatus and reversed its last political machination. It discussed Peng Zhen's political errors in detail, stating that he had defended Wu Han and prevented political criticism of Hai Rui Dismissed from Office and thereby obscured the class struggle. The 16 May notification wrote that, instead of mobilizing the whole party and the masses, the Outline "does its best to lead the movement toward the right". The February Outline had adopted "a confused, contradictory, and hypocritical language [...] obfuscating [...] the bitter class struggle that is being waged in culture and ideology". It also criticized Peng Zhen's promotion of the bourgeois standard of creating art for art's sake, rather than art in service to politics: "The objective of this great struggle is to criticize and repudiate Wu Han and numerous other representatives of the anti-Party and anti-Socialist bourgeoise [sic]."

The notification also ambiguously criticized unspecified rightists in the party who "sleep by our side", and comparing them explicitly to Nikita Khrushchev. Going beyond a condemnation of Peng Zhen, this paragraph of the Notification read:

The representatives of the bourgeois who have infiltrated the Party, the government, the army, and various cultural sectors are a group of counterrevolutionary revisionists. Once the conditions are ripe, they will seize power and transform the proletarian dictatorship into a bourgeois dictatorship. Some of them we have already identified, but not others. Others, for example individuals like Khruschev [sic] who still enjoy our trust, are being trained as our successors and can be found at present among us. (Note: 睡在我们的旁边; 'they sleep by our side')

This implied that there were enemies of the Communist cause within the Party itself: class enemies who "wave the red flag to oppose the red flag". Although relatively few details are known about the meeting where the notification was issued, this paragraph made an enormous impression particularly on Mao's closest allies: Lin Biao found the statement "extremely disturbing", and Zhang Chunqiao said that at the time he did not know who this referred to.

=== Drafting process ===
The notification was initially drafted by Chen Boda and Mao made major revisions to it, including the addition of the "sleep by our side" paragraph. Mao also wrote the sentence stating, "The objective of this great struggle is to criticize and repudiate Wu Han and numerous other representatives of the anti-Party and anti-Socialist bourgeoisie." Mao chose the deliberately understated name for the document.

== Interpretations and consequences ==
Immediately following the notification, Lin Biao gave a speech in which he communicated his view that the 16 May Notification was intended to "forestall a counterrevolutionary plot" and to establish the absolute authority of Mao's "thought". Academic Alessandro Russo interprets Lin's speech as prompted by the institutional uncertainty raised by Mao's warning of secret rightists in the party who are "like Khrushchev", and that Lin was relying on Mao's personal authority to make up for the institutional uncertainty.

In a July letter to Jiang Qing, circulated publicly only after Lin's death, Mao described Lin's speech as containing "deeply disturbing" ideas. Mao's emphasis on a "struggle against revisionism" did not refer to the risk of a coup, but rather the "peaceful restoration" of capitalism. Mao wrote, "I have never thought that the pamphlets I have written had such magic power. Now that he has taken to inflating them, the whole country will follow suit. It seems exactly like the scene of the marrow-monger wife Wang who boasts of the quality of her goods". "They flatter me by praising me to the stars, [but] things turn to their contrary: the higher one is driven, the harder his fall. I am prepared to fall, shattering all my flesh and bones. It does not matter; matter is not destroyed, it only falls to pieces". Mao agreed to the Central Committee circulating Lin's speech as an official document and commented in his July 1966 letter, "This is the first time in my life that, on an important point, I have given way to another against my better judgment; let us say independently of my will". Mao's assent to the circulation of Lin's speech would ultimately help result in his 1970–71 political battle against Lin.

Following the ouster of Peng Zhen and his allies, Chen Boda and Jiang Qing became the center of a new Cultural Revolution Group.
