= Five Man Group =

1965 Chinese group to study cultural revolution

The Five Man Group (Chinese: 文化革命五人小组; pinyin: Wénhuà gémìng wǔ rén xiǎozǔ; lit. 'cultural revolution five-person group'; also known as the Group of Five) was an informal committee established in the People's Republic of China in early 1965 to explore the potential for a "cultural revolution" in China. The group was led by Peng Zhen (the mayor of Beijing), the fifth most senior member of the Politburo.

The Group was said to be tasked with studying popular trends in China's arts and cultural realms. In 1965 the Group commissioned a study of the play Hai Rui Dismissed from Office, written by Vice-Mayor Wu Han, which came under suspicion for being an anti-Mao allegory. The Group then released the February Outline, a document arguing that the play was not of a political nature. Mao became offended by the Outline and dissolved the group in May 1966, when it was replaced by the Cultural Revolution Group. Mao argued that Yao Wenyuan hadn't focused on the word 'dismissed' in the title of the play, which, according to Mao, was the crucial word since the play had been written not long after Marshal Peng Dehuai had been dismissed. Peng Zhen still argued that the play was not political since Wu Han had no organisational ties with Peng Dehuai. Peng Zhen was subsequently purged.

== Origins ==
Throughout the 1960s, Chairman Mao Zedong had become increasingly concerned with the prevailing bourgeois culture and attitudes of Communist China. Mao viewed these attitudes as symptomatic of fundamental problems in Chinese society – problems which needed to be resolved. At a meeting of the Politburo in January 1965, Mao called on his Party colleagues to initiate a revolution in China's culture, and the meeting established the Five Man Group under Peng Zhen (the fifth most senior member of the Politburo) to oversee and co-ordinate this planned revolution. Of the five members of the group, only Kang Sheng could be considered to be a firm supporter of Mao. The other members were Lu Dingyi, the head of the Central Committee's Propaganda Department, Wu Lengxi, the editor of the People's Daily, and Zhou Yang.

== Role in the build-up to the Cultural Revolution ==
From January to November 1965, the Five Man Group was essentially dormant, playing little part in the events that were to precede the Cultural Revolution. However, the publication of Yao Wenyuan's criticism of Wu Han's play Hai Rui Dismissed From Office spurred the group into action. Technically, the Five Man Group had to be consulted before attacks on senior figures like Wu Han were made, and Yao's failure to do this displeased Peng. He was not prepared to allow the academic criticism of Wu Han's play to develop into a political debate, and so he moved to block the distribution of Yao Wenyuan's politically motivated article. In February 1966, Peng attacked Yao and other Maoist writers for "treating a purely academic question in political terms", and by spring 1966 the group had successfully managed to keep the debate over Hai Rui Dismissed From Office as purely an academic one.

Concerned that the group was stifling the development of the Cultural Revolution, Mao engineered the dissolution of the Five Man Group in the May 16th Circular. The same document condemned Peng Zhen for obstructing the Cultural Revolution, and replaced the group with the Cultural Revolution Group, an organisation of Maoist supporters that would bring a significantly more radical thrust to the Cultural Revolution. In the subsequent months, Peng and his supporters were dismissed from their offices, with the mayor of Beijing becoming the first major casualty of the movement. Lu Dingyi, the head of the party's propaganda department, was also purged.
