= Xie Fuzhi =

Chinese communist

- 谢富治
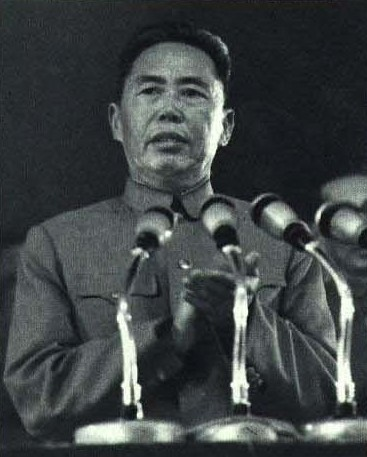
- Xie Fuzhi in 1965

Secretary of the Secretariat of the Chinese Communist Party
- In office 1966–1972

Minister of Public Security
- In office 17 September 1959 – 22 June 1970
- Preceded by: Luo Ruiqing
- Succeeded by: Li Zhen

Personal details
- Born: 26 September 1909 Hong'an County, Hubei, China
- Died: 26 March 1972 (aged 62) Beijing, China
- Party: Chinese Communist Party (1931–1972)
- Spouse: Liu Xiangping
- Children: Xie Tieniu Xie Xiaoqing(Liu Qing)

Military service
- Allegiance: People's Republic of China
- Branch/service: People's Liberation Army
- Years of service: 1930−1972
- Rank: General (Shang Jiang)

Xie Fuzhi (simplified Chinese: 谢富治; traditional Chinese: 謝富治; pinyin: Xiè Fùzhì; Wade–Giles: Hsieh Fu-chih; 26 September 1909 – 26 March 1972) was a Chinese Communist Party military commander, political commissar, and national security specialist. He was born in 1909 in Hong'an County, Hubei and died in Beijing in 1972. Xie was known for his efficiency and his loyalty to Mao Zedong, and during the Cultural Revolution he played a key role in hunting down Mao's enemies in his capacity as Minister of Public Security from 1959 to 1972.

== Military career ==
He joined the Chinese Communist Party in 1931, at the age of 22.

Prior to 1949, Xie served as a political commissar in the 4th Column of the 2nd Field Army, under a commissars’ chain of command that led to Field Army Political Commissar Deng Xiaoping. His unit was involved in the victorious Huai Hai Campaign against the right-wing Kuomintang, after which it was merged into the newly formed 14th Army of the 2nd Field Army as the 41st Division. Xie emerged from the post-liberation reorganization as Political Commissar of the 4th Army, 2nd Field Army. He served with his former co-commander General Chen Geng, and concurrently as Deputy Political Commissar of the 3rd Army, 2nd Field Army under General Chen Xilian, later to become another Cultural Revolution military figure in support of Chairman Mao.

=== The People's Republic ===
After the establishment of the People's Republic of China in 1949 and his military activities, Xie was appointed Deputy Minister of Public Security, the number two figure in the security establishment. He also became first secretary of the CPC Yunnan Committee, serving in these capacities until 1959, when by decision of Mao he replaced Luo Ruiqing as Minister of Public Security.

In 1955 he was conferred the rank of Shang Jiang (i.e., General).

He was elected member of the Central Committee of the Chinese Communist Party at the Eight National Congress in 1956, and a member of the Central Military Commission.

== Cultural Revolution ==
Xie gave a speech in the summer of 1966, in his capacity as Minister of Public Security, that essentially gave carte blanche to the Red Guards to confiscate and kill their opponents. Xie, unlike other People's Liberation Army (PLA) Generals, was fond of the Red Guards and sought to develop them as a parallel army, a special security force. The Gang of Four, Xie's allies, had similar ideas about creating a paramilitary force to balance the power of the PLA. Some consider the speech he gave to be the trigger for the violence that followed.

His staunch support for the Cultural Revolution led him to be elected alternate member of the Politburo, secretary of the Secretariat and a member of the reorganized Beijing Committee in 1966. He was also a member of the powerful Cultural Revolution Group.

In 1967, as it was happening throughout the country starting from Shanghai, in Beijing all power was passed to a new revolutionary committee, of which Xie Fuzhi was elected chairman. He was preferred over CPC Beijing Committee Secretary Li Xuefeng who was deemed to be too hostile to the Red Guards. He was also first political commissar of the Beijing Military Region.

At the same time, Xie launched an anti-revisionist campaign within the security and intelligence personnel of the Ministry of Public Security, declaring it had followed a counter-revolutionary line under Luo Ruiqing. His active support for the Cultural Revolution led him to be elected full member of the Politburo at the Ninth Congress in 1969. In 1971, when the Beijing Party Committee was re-elected, he was appointed its first secretary.

Xie remained in charge of state security until his sudden death in 1972.

=== The Wuhan Incident ===
In July 1967, PLA Wuhan Military Region Commander General Chen Zaidao backed the more conservative Million Heroes Red Guard faction against its militant opponents, the Wuhan Workers' General Headquarters (WWGH). Premier Zhou Enlai ordered General Chen to back down, and support the WWGH, but he refused to do so. Xie and Wang Li were sent to Wuhan to persuade General Chen to obey Zhou's orders. On July 20, PLA forces detained, slapped and humiliated Xie and allowed Wang to be held by the Million Heroes faction. Premier Zhou flew to Wuhan but was prevented from landing by a show of military force at the airport. At that point, the army sent in three infantry divisions and other units, and forced General Chen to surrender without a fight. Xie and Wang were welcomed back to Beijing by a mass rally in Tiananmen Square on July 25.

After returning to Beijing, Xie played a key role in providing military weapons to favored Red Guard factions, including the supply of 500 rifles to the Jinggangshan Commune of Beijing's Teacher's University.

== Legacy ==
Xie died before the denunciation of the Gang of Four in 1976, but he was identified in official documents, along with Kang Sheng, as equally responsible for the excesses of the Cultural Revolution and guilty of "anti-party activities". He was posthumously expelled from the Party in 1980 and his ashes were removed from the Babaoshan Revolutionary Cemetery.

== See also ==
- List of generals of the People's Republic of China

Political offices
Preceded by Luo Ruiqing	Minister of Public Security; 1959–1972	Succeeded by Li Zhen
Preceded by Wu De as Acting Mayor of Beijing	Chairman of the Beijing Revolutionary Committee; 1967–1972	Succeeded by Wu De
Party political offices
Preceded by Song Renqiong	Secretary of the CPC Yunnan Committee; 1952–1959	Succeeded by Yan Hongyan
Preceded by Li Xuefeng; Vacant since 1967	Secretary of the CPC Beijing Committee; 1971–1972	Succeeded by Wu De
