= Wang Li (politician) =

Chinese politician (1922–1996)

Wang Li (Chinese: 王力; August 11, 1922 – October 21, 1996), born Wang Guangbin (Chinese: 王光賓) was a Chinese Communist propagandist and prominent member of the Cultural Revolution Group, in charge of overseeing the Cultural Revolution movement of Mao Zedong. Wang joined the Communist movement in his youth and became a specialist in theory and propaganda work. He was one of the leading figures of party propaganda at the outset of the Cultural Revolution, and contributed to the synthesis of Mao's theory of "continuous revolution."

Despite being one of the leading proponents of the mass movement, Wang became one of its victims. He was purged on orders from Mao in 1967, shortly after he delivered an incendiary speech in support of rebellion at the Ministry of Foreign Affairs, and was sent to prison. He was retroactively denounced as a secret agent and extremist, and assigned blame for the Cultural Revolution's early excesses. He was released in 1982, and, having lost favor with both the Maoist and reform wings of the Chinese Communist Party, was duly expelled from the party in 1983.

== Early career ==
Wang was originally from Huai'an, Jiangsu province. In October 1935, he joined the Communist Youth League. He joined the Chinese Communist Party (CCP) in 1939 on the recommendation of Gu Mu. He joined the military expedition force in northeastern China, then began working for Masses Daily (大众日报), the party mouthpiece in Shandong province, as a reporter, then he became lead editor. In 1943, he became the editor-in-chief of the CCP revolutionary agitation periodical Struggle (斗争生活), then he authored a book Sunny Skies under the pseudonym Wang Li, under which he became known. During the Chinese civil war, he worked as a member of the land reform team in the Bohai Sea region of Shandong, working on training CCP land reform officials. After the founding of the People's Republic of China in 1949, Wang worked as a propaganda official in Shandong province.

In 1953, under orders from the authorities, Wang became a propaganda advisor to the Communist Party of Vietnam. He returned to China in October 1955, when he joined the party's commission on international activities. In 1958 he began working for the flagship CCP periodical Red Flag. From 9 to 14 July, he was a member of the Chinese delegation led by Mao Dun to the World Peace Congress held in Moscow, Soviet Union, where he had conversations with Yuri Andropov. In 1963, he began serving as deputy head of the International Department of the Chinese Communist Party. During the Sino-Soviet split, Wang was one of the lead authors of the Nine Commentaries on the Communist Party of the Soviet Union, for which he received attention from Mao. In 1964 he began attending meetings of the CCP Politburo Standing Committee and was the lead drafter of key party documents.

== Cultural Revolution ==
He penned several prominent screeds against then head of state Liu Shaoqi during the latter's involvement in the "work teams" issue, which decisively broke him (Liu) with Mao. On January 8, 1967, Wang was named head of the party propaganda leading group, effectively replacing the Propaganda Department, which was disbanded. Wang gained prominence during the early stages of the Cultural Revolution as a major figure of the Cultural Revolution Group.

=== Wuhan Incident ===
During the Wuhan Incident in July 1967, Wang was dispatched as a representative of the central authorities in Wuhan to resolve an increasingly contentious factional standoff in the city between two major mass organizations. Carrying orders from Zhou Enlai that were tacitly approved by Mao, Wang publicly threw his support behind the rebel "Workers' Headquarters" mass organisation, which alienated the other major faction - the "Million Heroes", a "conservative" group which supported the Hubei provincial Party leadership and especially Wuhan Military Region commander Chen Zaidao. Troops of local PLA Unit 8201, aligned with the Million Heroes, then captured Wang Li and beat him. Wang's handover to another local army unit was negotiated, followed by his release into the hands of the PLA Air Force who flew him back to Beijing. On his return he received a hero's welcome for having helped resolve the situation in Wuhan in favour of the "Workers' Headquarters" rebel group and for having survived the attack.

=== Ministry of Foreign Affairs incident ===
On August 7, 1967, Wang Li visited the Ministry of Foreign Affairs and called for the ascendant rebels there to bravely attack incumbent power figures. This led to the burning of the British mission in Beijing and paved the way for open criticism of Minister of Foreign Affairs Chen Yi and a mass mobilization of rebels who took over day-to-day functions of the ministry. Red Guards also targeted foreign diplomats, often applying physical violence. The events led to an international uproar and further isolated China on the global stage.

Shortly thereafter, Mao declared, "Wang Li, Guan Feng and Qi Benyu are bad people, they are cockroaches, they must be arrested immediately." He was then placed in solitary confinement. Wang's later recollection of the event asserted that Mao had reviewed his speech prior to his delivering it.

== Downfall and prison ==
In January 1968 Wang was sent to Qincheng Prison. He was never prosecuted for any crimes, and was released in 1982. In 1983, he was expelled from the CCP, despite not having played any political role following his release. Neither the Mao-era or post-Mao CCP specified the nature of Wang Li's crimes, making his case one of the more perplexing episodes of CCP historiography.

Wang's case presented a difficult conundrum for party historians. Recognizing that Wang Li was essentially a political sacrificial lamb for Mao, Jiang Qing, and other members of the Cultural Revolution 'central command', the post-Mao party, still holding Mao officially in high regard, could not highlight Mao's own role in Wang's downfall; at the same time, it was also unable to rehabilitate Wang Li as a Cultural Revolution "victim" as Wang himself was one of the most fervent advocates of persecuting others at the early stages of the movement. This inherent contradiction meant that Wang's case was never truly resolved, and that official party histories continued to cast Wang as having had far more agency and culpability for events over which he had little control.

Wang lived in obscurity in west Beijing for the rest of his life. He wrote the party leadership on 102 separate occasions to ask for forgiveness and rehabilitation but was rebuffed. Wang wrote a set of detailed memoirs about his involvement in the Cultural Revolution - a work that has emerged as a key primary source in the study of the time period. The memoir revealed that Wang continued to be an ideologically committed Maoist after he was released from prison. In the work, Wang steadfastly avoided criticizing Mao personally; he was less reticent about Jiang Qing, Kang Sheng, and others.

In May 1996, Wang was diagnosed with pancreatic cancer. He died at Beijing Tumour Hospital on October 21, 1996.
