= Yao Wenyuan =

Chinese politician (1931–2005)

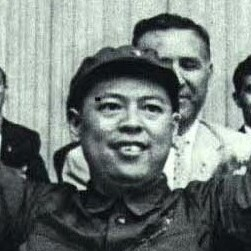
- Born: January 12, 1931; Zhuji, Zhejiang, Republic of China
- Died: December 23, 2005 (aged 74); Shanghai, People's Republic of China
- Occupation: Politician
- Known for: Gang of Four
- Political party: Chinese Communist Party

Yao Wenyuan
- Chinese: 姚文元
Transcriptions
Standard Mandarin
- Hanyu Pinyin: Yáo Wényuán
- Wade–Giles: Yao^{2} Wen^{2}-yüan^{2}
- IPA: [jǎʊ wə̌nɥɛ̌n]

Yao Wenyuan (12 January 1931 – 23 December 2005) was a Chinese literary critic and politician, and a member of the Gang of Four during the Cultural Revolution. A polemicist in Shanghai in the 1950s, he rose with the support of Zhang Chunqiao, and his attack on the play Hai Rui Dismissed from Office, published in November 1965, is regarded as the opening shot of the Cultural Revolution.

Yao became a member of the Cultural Revolution Group, and from 1969 he sat on the Politburo, where he oversaw the party's propaganda and earned the nickname "the killer with the pen". He was arrested with the other members of the Gang of Four in October 1976, and in 1981 he was sentenced to 20 years in prison. He was released in 1996 after serving his full term, and was the last of the four to die.

== Early life ==
Yao was the son of the writer Yao Pengzi, a native of Zhuji in Zhejiang. Accounts of Yao's birthplace differ: an obituary carried by the Mail & Guardian gives Zhuji County, while the writer Xia Fei writes that he was born in Shanghai in 1931. His father was a writer, translator and art critic.

Yao Pengzi had known Lu Xun since 1924, joined the Chinese Communist Party (CCP) in 1927, and served on the executive committee of the League of Left-Wing Writers. In December 1933, he was arrested in Tianjin, and on 14 May 1934 he published a statement renouncing the party in the Kuomintang's Central Daily. He then served on Nationalist cultural and censorship committees, and during the war against Japan he ran the Writers' Bookstore in Chongqing. According to Xia Fei, Yao Pengzi concealed his defection, and in 1955 he was briefly arrested in connection with the case of Pan Hannian, who had introduced him to the party. He later taught at Shanghai Normal College, was labelled a traitor during the Cultural Revolution and died in 1969.

Yao attended the Nankai junior middle school in Chongqing, and then the Datong and Huxin middle schools in Shanghai. In 1948, he joined the CCP's underground organisation in Shanghai.

== Literary critic ==
After 1949, Yao worked in the propaganda department of the party committee of Shanghai's Luwan District, and by 1953 he headed its theory and education section. That year, he wrote to the critic Feng Xuefeng asking about his father's past, in what the writer Chen Shuyu sees as an effort to distance himself from Yao Pengzi. In late 1954, he was assigned to lecture district cadres on the literary thought of Hu Feng, but after reading an article by Zhou Yang, he turned against Hu. In 1955, he published a series of attacks on Hu Feng in Wenyi Bao, Jiefang Daily and Wenhui Bao.

His speech against Hu Feng caught the attention of Zhang Chunqiao, then editor-in-chief of Jiefang Daily, who invited him to write for the paper and recommended his work to other newspapers. According to Xia Fei, Zhang taught him to read the political signals in the press and to follow Mao Zedong's intentions.

During the Hundred Flowers Campaign, on 6 February 1957, Yao published an article in Wenhui Bao criticising the novelist Yao Xueyin. Mao praised the article on 16 February, and on 10 March he told a Shanghai cultural delegation that Yao had fewer one-sided views than other young writers. On 14 June 1957, the People's Daily reprinted an article that Yao had published in Wenhui Bao four days earlier. He sat on Shanghai's "anti-rightist leading group" during the Anti-Rightist Campaign. At the end of 1957, he wrote an article attacking Feng Xuefeng's literary line, which Wenyi Bao published in February 1958.

== Hai Rui Dismissed from Office ==
In early 1965, Jiang Qing travelled secretly to Shanghai to plan a critique of Wu Han's historical play Hai Rui Dismissed from Office. Yao wrote the article under arrangements made by Jiang Qing and Zhang Chunqiao, and he worked on it at a villa on Huashan Road in Shanghai. "On the New Historical Play Hai Rui Dismissed from Office" appeared in the Shanghai newspaper Wenhui Bao on 10 November 1965.

Wu Han was a deputy mayor of Beijing. Yao's article argued that the play's scenes of land being returned to peasants and of wrongful verdicts being redressed echoed the contemporary trends towards individual farming and the reversal of verdicts. It was read as a charge that the play was a coded attack on Mao for dismissing the defence minister Peng Dehuai in 1959, after Peng had criticised the Great Leap Forward. The article set off the political struggle of the following year, and the party's 1981 resolution on its history identified it as the trigger of the Cultural Revolution.

When the Shanghai teacher Lin Bingyi published a rebuttal in Wenhui Bao, Yao attacked him in December 1965 and again in March 1966, writing under the pen names Jinsong and Wu Ding. According to an appendix to the writer Ye Yonglie's biography of Yao, Yao published 18 articles, excluding speeches and messages, between the Hai Rui critique and the end of the Cultural Revolution.

== Cultural Revolution ==
Yao became a member of the Cultural Revolution Group, and served as head of propaganda in Shanghai before moving to Beijing. In Shanghai, he helped to encourage the seizure of power in January 1967, and then to suppress the Shanghai People's Commune. He became first vice-chairman of the Shanghai Revolutionary Committee, under Zhang Chunqiao.

In August 1968, Yao published "The Working Class Must Exercise Leadership in Everything", which called for workers' propaganda teams to enter the schools and to remain there permanently. He also argued that no "independent kingdom" could be permitted to exist in China. In April 1969, at the first plenary session of the 9th Central Committee, he was elected to the Politburo. He ran the party's propaganda apparatus, including the theoretical journal Red Flag, and drafted government documents and directed media campaigns. He was re-elected to the Politburo at the first plenary session of the 10th Central Committee on 30 August 1973.

In 1975, Yao published "On the Social Basis of the Lin Piao Anti-Party Clique" in Red Flag, which argued that "bourgeois right" persisted in distribution and exchange under socialism and must be restricted, and that new bourgeois elements were emerging within the party and the state. He co-wrote other articles in 1975 and 1976 warning of a "new bourgeoisie" in the party. After the death of Zhou Enlai in January 1976, he cut the newspaper coverage of the premier's death from four pages to one.

== Arrest and trial ==
On 6 October 1976, less than a month after Mao's death, Yao was arrested with Jiang Qing, Zhang Chunqiao and Wang Hongwen. In July 1977, the Central Committee expelled the four from the party and removed them from all their posts.

Yao was tried before the special court of the Supreme People's Court in the trial of the Lin Biao and Jiang Qing cliques, from 20 November 1980 to 25 January 1981. The charges against him included slandering party officials and suppressing the protesters of Nanjing and of the Tiananmen incident of 1976. Prosecutors quoted him as saying, "Why can't we shoot a few counter-revolutionary elements? After all, dictatorship is not like embroidering flowers." At his trial, Yao said that he had made mistakes but committed no crimes. On 25 January 1981, the court sentenced him to 20 years' imprisonment and five years' deprivation of political rights, as a principal member of the Jiang Qing counter-revolutionary clique. A government magazine wrote that year that "his weapon to kill people was the pen".

== Later life and death ==
Yao was held in Qincheng Prison, where his wife Jin Ying visited him after the verdict. He was released in October 1996 after serving his full sentence, at the age of 65, and was the only member of the Gang of Four to complete his sentence. He was reportedly given security protection against revenge by former victims. After his release, he devoted himself to the study of history. He wrote a memoir of the Cultural Revolution, but the authorities did not allow it to be published, and according to the Irish Times, the former leader Jiang Zemin vetoed its publication.

Yao died of diabetes in Shanghai on 23 December 2005, at the age of 74. The Xinhua News Agency announced his death on 6 January 2006, more than two weeks later, in a brief statement describing him as a principal culprit of the counter-revolutionary cliques of Lin Biao and Jiang Qing. He was the last surviving member of the Gang of Four, Zhang Chunqiao having died the previous April. He is buried at Fushou Cemetery in Shanghai's Qingpu District, under a tombstone that bears no name.

== Assessments ==
Yao is remembered as the chief propagandist of the Gang of Four, and the state media labelled him "the killer with a pen". The Irish Times described him as an ideological hardliner whose writings were incendiary. An obituary carried by the Mail & Guardian called him a literary polemicist who was often opportunistic, but argued that the common portrayal of him as a writer who simply wrote to order was oversimplified. The political scientist Johnny Lau said in 2006 that Yao's death had no significance, but that it reminded people of how certain figures had set back China's development.

== Works ==
- "On the New Historical Play Hai Rui Dismissed from Office" (1965), Wenhui Bao, 10 November 1965
- "The Working Class Must Exercise Leadership in Everything" (1968), English translation in Peking Review, no. 35, 30 August 1968
- "On the Social Basis of the Lin Piao Anti-Party Clique" (1975), Red Flag, 1975, no. 3, English translation in Peking Review, no. 10, 7 March 1975

== Publications ==
- Yao Wen-yuan: On the Social Basis Of The Lin Piao Antiparty Clique. Foreign Languages Press, Peking 1975.
