= Hai Rui Dismissed from Office =

Politically significant theatrical play

- Original title: 海瑞罢官
- Original language: Mandarin Chinese
- Written by: Wu Han
- Genre: tragedy

Premiere
- Date: 1962
- Place: Beijing

Hai Rui Dismissed from Office
- Traditional Chinese: 海瑞罷官
- Simplified Chinese: 海瑞罢官
Transcriptions
Standard Mandarin
- Hanyu Pinyin: Hǎi Ruì bàguān
- Wade–Giles: Hai^{3} Jui^{4} Pa^{4}-kuan^{1}

Hai Rui Dismissed from Office (Chinese: 海瑞罢官; also called Dismissal of Hai Jui in English) is a stage play, written by Wu Han (1909–1969), notable for its involvement in Chinese politics during the Cultural Revolution. The play itself focused on the loyal Ming minister Hai Rui, who was portrayed as a savior to passive peasants for whom he reversed unjust land confiscations. The play became a center of scholarly and political controversy because of its implications for debates within the communist party, including at the Lushan Conference, regarding the political role of peasants going forward in light of the failures during the Great Leap Forward.

== Background ==
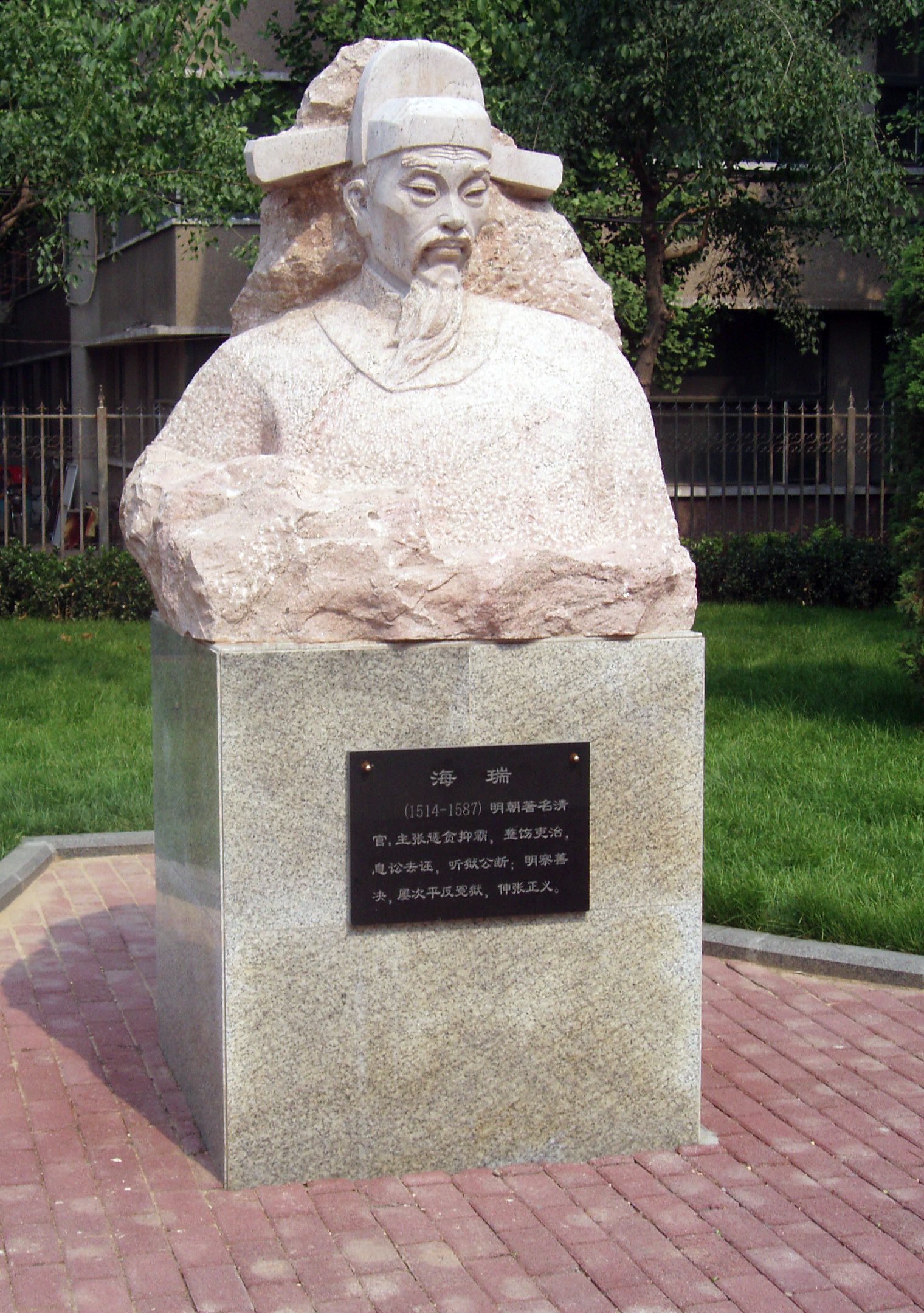
Statue of Hai Rui in Haikou

Wu Han, who wrote the play, was a historian and politician who focused on the Ming Dynasty. He also served simultaneously as a Deputy Mayor in Beijing. In 1959, Wu became interested in the life of Hai Rui (1514–1587), a Ming-era minister who was imprisoned for criticizing the Jiajing Emperor. Wu Han wrote several articles on his life and his fearless criticism of the emperor. Wu then wrote a Beijing opera entitled "Hai Rui Dismissed from Office," which he revised several times before the final version of 1961. The play was first staged in early 1962. Wu was not a connoisseur of Beijing opera and rarely went to see it, a fact he noted in the preface to his play. Academic Alessandro Russo writes that Wu's rare opera attendance may have been because in the 1950s and early 1960s, cultured Chinese did not see it as a "commendable spectacle" but better suited for popular enjoyment. "It was probably also for this reason that the state's central cultural apparatus used the Beijing opera to disseminate historical knowledge."

== Synopsis ==
The play is a tragedy in which an honest official carries the complaints of the people to the emperor at the expense of his career. It portrays Hai as an efficient magistrate who requests an audience with the emperor. Hai then criticizes the Emperor directly for tolerating the corruption and abuses perpetuated by other officials in the imperial government. The emperor is so offended by Hai's criticism that he dismisses Hai from office. Hai is restored to office after the emperor dies. Peasants are portrayed as passive and innocent victims awaiting a savior, and they celebrate Hai Rui.

The play was published under Wu's pen name, Liu Mianzhi, the name of a Song dynasty scholar and a supporter of general Yue Fei. The play enjoyed great success. With a changing political climate, the play later came under severe criticism.

== Political debates ==
=== Hai Rui and the Lushan Conference ===
Hai Rui was one of Mao Zedong's favorite historical figures. In the context of the problems of false production statistics arising during the Great Leap Forward, Mao called on party leaders in April 1959 to learn from Hai Rui to tell the truth, and stated that party members were nowhere near as brave as Hai Rui. In this April 1959 meeting preparing for the Lushan Conference, Mao cited Hai Rui as an example of an official who challenged authority by authoring a Memorandum to the Emperor in which he criticized "very sharply and without any compliments." Mao asked his audience, "How many of our comrades today have Hai Rui's courage?" The historical figure of Hai Rui was also referenced during the discussions at the Lushan Conference itself. In one of the most tense moments of the controversy over the problems of the Great Leap Forward, Mao stated:

Hai Rui has moved house; in the Ming Dynasty Hai Rui was on the left . . . now Hai Rui is on the right. I have selective listening, I listen only to one side. Hai Rui was left-wing; I like the left-wing Hai Rui. Today, to criticize our shortcoming based on a Marxist position is correct; I support the left-wing Hai Rui.

After the initial performance of Hai Rui Dismissed from Office, critics began to interpret it as an allegory for Peng Dehuai's criticism of Mao during the 1959 Lushan Conference, which had led Mao to purge Peng Dehuai. Politically aware Chinese readily understood the emperor as Mao, Hai Rui as Peng Dehuai, and the unjust land verdicts as comparable to the policies of the Great Leap Forward. Peng Dehuai himself stated "I want to be a Hai Rui!" in a 1962 letter to Mao requesting his return to politics.

=== Yao Wenyuan's critical article ===
In 1965, Yao Wenyuan published "Criticizing the New Historical Drama Hai Rui Dismissed from Office." Yao's article argued that Wu Han had distorted the historical record and that the aspect of reversing unjust land verdicts provided a focal point for "bourgeois opposition" who wanted "to demolish the people's communes and to restore the criminal rule of the landlords and rich peasants." Yao's article was suggested to him and sponsored by Jiang Qing and Zhang Chunqiao. Although close to Mao personally, Jiang and Zhang were outside the cultural apparatus of the party. While Mao supported their efforts, his involvement initially was limited to discussing and revising Yao's article. Mao suggested that Jiang show the draft article to senior leaders Kang Shen and Zhou Enlai, but Jiang refused because doing so would have required that the article also have to be shown to Deng Xiaoping and Liu Shaoqi, who might censor it. Ultimately, Yao's article was published in Wenhui Bao, an important Shanghai newspaper which was both widely read for its cultural content and political review, because it was not officially an organ of the party and was not subject to prior restraints.

Official party organs immediately reacted with hostility to Yao's article. Peng Zhen, who headed a top-level political bureau in charge of cultural policies called the Group of Five, prevented other newspapers from republishing Yao's article for three weeks. Even a personal request by Mao to publish Yao's critique as a pamphlet was rejected by party authorities in Beijing. Once it was no longer feasible to prevent other newspapers from republishing it, including because Zhou intervened, Peng Zhen consented to its reprinting. Peng Zhen attempted to censor any contemporary political implications of the article, however.`

In the weeks immediately following reprinting of Yao's article criticizing the play, Wu supporters criticized Yao for "dragg[ing] political issues into academic questions" and argued for a "distinction between scholarship and politics," without which it would be "highly difficult to express any opinions." They attempted to downplay any connection between the play and the party's discord over peasant politics. In contrast, those critical of the play argued that by embellishing Hai Rui as a hero of the people, Wu had violated "the principle of historical materialism, which holds that it is the masses who make history." A third view among those responding to the controversy was that the presentation of character of Hai Rui had to be considered in historical context, and what was most important in analyzing the character's political position was whether Hai Rui had "promoted or hindered the progress of history."

=== Wu Han's self-criticism article ===
Following advice from Peng Zhen, Wu Han responded to the growing controversy with a self-criticism article, stating that he had been "divorced from both politics and reality" and "writing the play for the sake of writing a play." Wu wrote, "In a word, I forgot class struggle!" Wu's article began with a chronology intended to implicitly distance his play and other writings on Hai Rui from the controversy at the Lushan Conference, but the effect backfired. Because Yao Wenyuan's article had not directly raised the connection with the Lushan Conference, Wu's chronology looked like an unnecessary apology. Additionally, the chronology demonstrated that Wu wrote his Hai Rui articles immediately before and immediately after the conference. Scholarly debate continued following Wu's self-criticism article, with many Chinese historians concluding that the article was a mix of sophistry and concessions on minor points that avoided the major political issues related to the play.

=== The February Outline and Mao Zedong ===
Six weeks after the publication of Yao Wenyuan's critical article, Mao Zedong made his first significant statement on the controversy December 21, 1965. At a work conference of the Central Committee, Mao stated, "Peng Dehuai is Hai Rui." Although he did not discuss Yao's article at length, Mao noted that it had not gotten to the core political issue raised by the matter of Hai Rui, namely the dismissal. Mao stated that the results of the 1959 Lushan Conference remained controversial and the political disagreements had grown in the time since the conference. Peng Zhen met with Mao the day after Mao's speech and objected, arguing that the dismissal should not be considered the core issue, as there were no organizational or personal ties between Wu and Peng Dehuai.

Peng Zhen became increasingly concerned about the criticism directed at Wu and continued efforts to end the dispute. Early in January 1966, he conveyed a meeting of the Shanghai Party Committee, maintained that Wu was left-wing, and that the debate over Hai Rui Dismissed from Office should "remain within academic limits." At his direction, the Group of Five drafted a formal disciplinary code (the "Outline Report on the Current Academic Discussion," also known as a "February Outline") intended to restrict the terms of the argument and thereby stop further articles comparing the play to contemporary political issues. The February Outline openly threatened the "obstinate Left" with discipline, urging that it bear in mind its "long-term behavior." The Party's Central Committee approved the February Outline. The Group of Five began investigation who in Shanghai was responsible for the initial publication of Yao's critical article without having asked approval from the Central Department of Propaganda. Mao opposed the inquiry, describing "[t]hose who prevent the publication of left-wing essays" as "great scholar-tyrants." Using a literary comparison which became famous after the incident, Mao told Peng Zhen, "The Central Department of Propaganda is the King of Hell's Palace. The King of Hell's Palace has to be overthrown and the imps set free: overthrow the cliques, set free the left."

=== Party Meetings and the Circular of May 16 ===
A series of top-level party meetings from mid-March to mid-May 1966 addressed the controversy following the February Outline and Mao Zedong's response to it. Peng Zhen argued that the February Outline was intended to encourage an open forum and that any arguable shortcomings in it could be corrected. Mao allies Kang Sheng (who like Peng Zhen, was a member of the Group of Five) and Chen Boda criticized Peng Zhen, including political positions he had taken in his role as Beijing's mayor prior to the Hai Rui Dismissed from Office controversy.

Once it became clear from the meetings that Peng Zhen did not have sufficient political support for his position, he announced that the February Outline would be suspended. Simultaneously, Peng Zhen tasked his office with preparing dossiers critical of his leftwing opponents. In late April, the Central Committee decided to revoke the February Outline, disband the Group of Five, disband the Beijing Party Committee which Peng Zhen led, and disavow his handling of the Hai Rui Dismissed from Office controversy.

The May 16 Notification formalized those decisions. The Circular of May 16 was the first major political declaration of the Cultural Revolution. Initially drafted by Chen Boda, Mao Zedong made major revisions. In voiding the February Outline and dissolving the Group of Five, The Circular of May 16 removed the highest level of the party's cultural apparatus. It discussed Peng Zhen's political errors in detail, stating that he had defended Wu Han and prevented political criticism of the play and therefore obscured the class struggle. The Circular of May 16 also ambiguously criticized unspecified rightists in the party who "sleep by our side," comparing such people to Nikita Khruschev.

== Consequences and historical interpretations ==
Wu Han became one of the first victims of the Cultural Revolution and died in prison in 1969. After Wu was purged, radical Maoists quickly purged other "rightists" from China's cultural institutions, and the theatre became an instrument for the Gang of Four to attack their political enemies. Wu was posthumously rehabilitated in 1979, shortly after Mao's death.

Having been at the time the fifth-highest-ranking member of the Politburo, Peng Zhen was the first high-profile target of the Cultural Revolution. The removal of Peng Zhen and others such as Lu Dingyi and Zhou Yang from their positions strengthened Mao's coalition and emboldened Mao's attacks on revisionism within the party. Peng Zhen and his supporters in the Beijing Party Committee and Beijing government were replaced by Li Xuefeng and other Maoists.

At the time of the controversy, the official narrative of Peng Zhen's downfall was that the "February Outline" was an abuse of power to protect Wu and that Peng Zhen had acted inappropriately by forcing the procedures through the approval process and imposing censorship on the political criticism. The Chinese government's view today, however, is that Peng Zhen's motive for issuing the February Outline was responding to a wave of public revulsion over the criticisms of Wu. In contrast to that view, Academic Alessandro Russo observes that public views of Yao Wenyuan's critical article were split, and that it was Peng Zhen himself and other party elites in the cultural apparatus who were most irritated by the criticism of Wu.

The historical record is not clear regarding why Mao ultimately gave his full support to the controversy created by Yao's article criticizing Hai Rui Dismissed from Office. Theories include that Wu was a suitable polemical target because he was not sufficiently ranking in the cultural apparatus to prompt a strong institutional defense. Others argue that Peng Zhen fell into a trap because he did not realize that the true objective was to attack his power. The official narrative in China is that to enforce orthodox political thought, the first targets of the Cultural Revolution were intellectuals. Academic Alessandro Russo writes that, to the contrary, the top levels of the party's cultural apparatus including Peng Zhen vigorously defended Wu for months, that the criticism of Wu came from the grassroots intellectual level where most of the participants in the controversy were history teachers, and that the initial targets were high ranking in the party cultural apparatus.

Academic Frederick Teiwes argues that as the controversy regarding Hai Rui Dismissed from Office unfolded, Mao had been plotting against his rival Chinese President Liu Shaoqi for months. Teiwes writes that because Peng Zhen was a longtime supporter of Liu, Mao could weaken Liu by attacking Peng Zhen via his subordinate Wu.

Although modern Chinese narratives often focus on the personal leadership power of Mao throughout the dispute, the early phase of the controversy and his inability to stop the promulgation of the "February Outline" demonstrate that he faced open and effective political resistance within the party.

== Related work ==
The theme was also the subject of a play written by Zhou Xinfang and with Xu Siyan (许思言), Hai Rui Submits His Memorial (海瑞上疏, Hai Rui Shangshu), and the play was performed by the Shanghai Peking Opera Troupe in 1959. Zhou Xinfang was also arrested and persecuted during the Cultural Revolution and died in 1975.

== Bibliography ==
- Domes, Jurgen. Peng Te-huai: The Man and the Image, London: C. Hurst & Company. 1985. ISBN 0-905838-99-8.
- Rice, Edward E. Mao's Way. Berkeley: University of California Press. 1974. ISBN 0-520-02623-3.
