= Chen Boda =

Chinese journalist, professor and political theorist

- 陈伯达

Member of the Politburo Standing Committee of the Chinese Communist Party
- In office 1966–1970

Personal details
- Born: Chen Shangyu; 29 July 1904 Hui'an, Fujian, Qing China
- Died: 20 September 1989 (aged 85) Beijing, China
- Party: Chinese Communist Party (1927–1973)
- Children: 4
- Education: Sun Yat-sen University

Chinese name
- Traditional Chinese: 陳伯達
- Simplified Chinese: 陈伯达
Transcriptions
Standard Mandarin
- Hanyu Pinyin: Chén Bódá
- Wade–Giles: Ch'en Po-ta
Southern Min
- Hokkien POJ: Tân Peh-ta̍t

Chen Boda (Note: Chinese: See Chinese name and romanizations) (29 July 1904 – 20 September 1989) was a Chinese Communist journalist, professor and political theorist who rose to power as the chief interpreter of Maoism (or "Mao Zedong Thought") in the first 20 years of the People's Republic of China. Chen became a close associate of Mao Zedong in Yan'an, during the late 1930s, drafting speeches and theoretical essays and directing propaganda.

After 1949, Chen played a leading role in overseeing mass media and ideology; at the start of the Cultural Revolution in 1966, Mao named him Chairman of the Cultural Revolution Group, entrusting him with the task of guiding the new mass movement. However, his ultra-radical line and close ties with Lin Biao eventually led to his downfall in 1970.

== Early life ==
Chen Boda was born Chen Jianxiang (simplified Chinese: 陈建相; traditional Chinese: 陳建相; pinyin: Chén Jiànxiāng; Pe̍h-ōe-jī: Tân Kiān-siong) in 1904 to peasant parents. His courtesy name was Shangyou (Chinese: 尚友; pinyin: Shàngyǒu; Pe̍h-ōe-jī: Siōng-iú). During his childhood, his family moved to Jimei, in modern-day Amoy, likely to facilitate young Chen's enrollment at the Jimei Normal School, from which Chen graduated as a schoolteacher (he taught at various elementary schools until 1927).

In 1925, Chen enrolled at Shanghai Labor University, studying literature, and in 1927 he joined the Chinese Communist Party. After returning to Fujian, he was hired as the personal secretary of General Zhang Zhen, helping to prepare for the 1926–1927 Northern Expedition from the CCP side of the First United Front. When the Front collapsed, Chen fled and was eventually arrested in Nanjing. He was released after a month on General Zhang's recommendation. Shortly thereafter, Chen was sent by the Party to Moscow Sun Yat-sen University, where he studied politics and Marxist philosophy for four years.

In 1931, Chen Boda returned to China, and married Sichuan native Zhu Yuren, who had also studied in Moscow. Chen became a professor of politics and ancient Chinese history at China College in Beijing while writing articles under the pen names Chen Zhimei and Chen Boda. Most of these articles focused on the dispute between advocates of "national defense literature" such as Lu Xun, and more nationalist authors. Chen also did underground work for the Party in Tianjin.

Chen instructed that Party cadres should perform "systemic critiques" of traditional philosophy like Confucianism, "enrich" dialectical materialism by applying it concretely in the Chinese context, and synthesize Chinese nationalism and proletarian internationalism. Chen described this approach as the "Sinification of Marxism," which was in part a precursor to Mao Zedong's May 1938 view of the Sinicization of Marxism.

From 1937 on, he taught politics and Marxist philosophy at the Central Party School of the Chinese Communist Party in Yan'an, where he became a leader in the Yan'an Rectification Movement. He soon became personal research assistant and chief political aide to Mao Zedong. Chen published the first collection of Mao's writings in 1937, and an official history of the Party in 1945.

== Role in the post–1949 government ==
After the Communist victory in the Chinese Civil War and the establishment of the People's Republic of China in 1949, Mao entrusted Chen with many important tasks. Chen Boda became:

- Deputy Director of the CCP Propaganda Department, overseeing the People's Daily and the Xinhua News Agency
- Director of the Institute of Political Research
- Editor-in-chief of the CCP theoretical organ Red Flag, when it was established in 1958
- Vice President of the Chinese Academy of Sciences, overseeing Social and Political Sciences (these departments later branched out to form the Chinese Academy of Social Sciences)

In 1951, Chen wrote an article with the title Mao Zedong's theory of the Chinese Revolution is the combination of Marxism-Leninism with the Chinese Revolution and a book entitled Mao Zedong on the Chinese Revolution. These works made him one of the most important interpreters of Mao Zedong Thought, and in the 1950s he became one of Mao's closest associates, compiling many of the quotations eventually published in the Red Book.

In 1950 Chen accompanied Mao to Moscow to participate in the negotiations with Joseph Stalin that led to the signing of the 30-year treaty of alliance (February 1950) between China and the Soviet Union.

Following Mao's complaint that "the economic sector is blocking me and Comrade Liu," Chen was appointed in 1962 to serve as a vice director of the State Planning Commission.

In the 1960s, Chen Boda advocated the strategy of "electrocentrism", through which the electronics industry should develop technological advancements and become embedded at all levels of China's economy. This included small-scale enterprises (not just large enterprises) producing electronics and that China could use the methods of a people's war to "smash electronic mysticism" and rapidly develop in the age of electronics.

=== Cultural Revolution ===
From 1966 until 1969, Chen Boda was to play an important role in the Cultural Revolution. In May 1966, he was placed at the head of the newly formed Central Cultural Revolution Group (CCRG), a body established to oversee and direct the course of the Cultural Revolution. In time, this group would rise to become the most important political body in China, surpassing even the influence of the Politburo. Furthermore, Chen Boda was also placed as head of the Communist government's propaganda apparatus alongside Jiang Qing when the previous leader, Lu Dingyi (with whom he had often quarrelled), was deposed in 1966. He also became a member of the Standing Committee of the Politburo.

According to the Central Committee leadership, the Cultural Revolution Group began to show signs of ultra-leftism during the late 1960s. Boda's reputation began to wane after the 9th Party Congress in 1969 due to his ties with Lin Biao (with whom he had closely collaborated in the publication of the Little Red Book) and his opposition to Zhou Enlai's attempt to deescalate the Cultural Revolution and refocus on consolidating the Party. This marked the end of Chen Boda's involvement in the Cultural Revolution. As the leadership became more moderate in its outlook and the initial aims of the Cultural Revolution were sidelined, Chen's radicalism caused concern, and he was denounced at the 10th Party Congress in 1973 as a 'revisionist secret agent' for his associations with Lin Biao.

== Later life ==
After the Cultural Revolution, he was tried by the post-Mao government for collaboration with the Gang of Four. He was sentenced to eighteen years in prison, but was released under parole shortly afterwards due to his ill health, and his parole time ended in 1988. He died on 20 September 1989, at the age of 85.
