= Politics of Shanghai =

- National emblem of China
- Legislature: Shanghai Municipal People's Congress
- Website: www.shanghai.gov.cn

Communist Party
- Party: Shanghai Municipal Committee of the Chinese Communist Party
- Secretary: Chen Jining

Government
- Executive: Municipal People's Government
- Mayor: Gong Zheng
- Executive Deputy Mayor: Wu Qing
- Congress Chairperson: Huang Lixin
- Local CPPCC Chairman: Hu Wenrong
- Commission for Discipline Inspection Secretary: Liu Xuexin
- Supervisory Director: Liu Xuexin
- Court President: Liu Xiaoyun
- Procurator General: Chen Yong
- Military: People's Liberation Army Shanghai Garrison
- Commander: Liu Jie

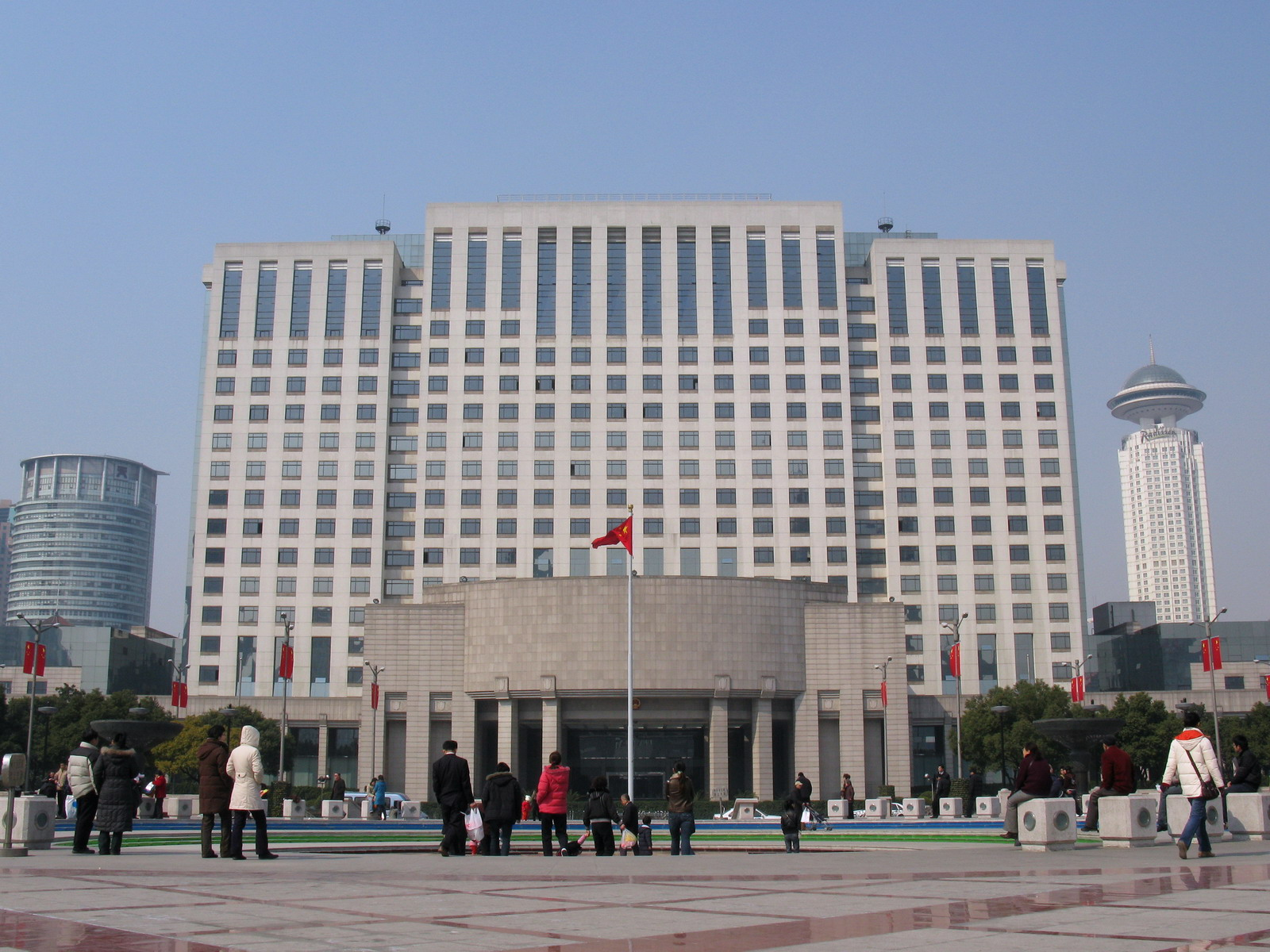
Shanghai Municipal Government building

The politics of Shanghai is structured in a dual party-government system like all other governing institutions in the mainland of the People's Republic of China (PRC). In the last few decades the city has produced many of the country's eventual senior leaders, including Jiang Zemin, Zhu Rongji, Wu Bangguo, Huang Ju, Xi Jinping, Yu Zhengsheng, Han Zheng, and Li Qiang.

== Overview ==
The Mayor of the Shanghai Municipal People's Government (上海市人民政府市长, shorten as 上海市市长 ie Mayor of Shanghai Municipality) is the highest ranking executive official in Shanghai. Since Shanghai is a direct-controlled municipality of China, the Mayor occupies the same level in the order of precedence as provincial governors. However, in the city's dual party-government governing system, the mayor has less power than the Shanghai Municipal Chinese Communist Party Committee Secretary (中国共产党上海市委员会书记, shorten as 中共上海市委书记), colloquially termed the "Shanghai CCP Party Chief" in English.

Before 1941, Shanghai had a split administration: the International Settlement (governed under the Shanghai Municipal Council), the French Concession, and the Chinese City. The Chinese city was invaded by the Japanese in 1937 and the International Settlement was occupied by the Japanese in 1941. After the occupation, the foreign powers formally ceded the territory to the Nationalist Government in Chongqing (a move largely symbolic until the Japanese surrender since the Nationalists no longer controlled Shanghai).

Political power in Shanghai has frequently been a stepping stone to higher positions in the central government. Since Jiang Zemin became the General Secretary of the Chinese Communist Party in June 1989, all former Shanghai party secretaries but one were elevated to the Politburo Standing Committee, the de facto highest decision-making body in China, including Jiang himself (Party General Secretary), Zhu Rongji (Premier), Wu Bangguo (NPC Chairman), Huang Ju (Vice Premier), Xi Jinping (current General Secretary), Yu Zhengsheng (CPPCC Chairman), Han Zheng (Vice Premier and Vice President), and Li Qiang (Premier). Zeng Qinghong, a former deputy party secretary of Shanghai, also rose to the Politburo Standing Committee and became the Vice President and an influential power broker. Li Xi, another former deputy party secretary of Shanghai, has become the Politburo Standing Committee and Secretary of CCDI member in 2022. The only exception is Chen Liangyu, who was fired in 2006 and later convicted of corruption.

== List of provincial-level leaders ==
=== CCP Committee Secretaries ===
No.	Portrait	Name	Took office	Left office	Ref.
1		Rao Shushi	1949	1950	
2		Chen Yi	1950	1954	
3		Ke Qingshi	1954	1965	
4		Chen Pixian	1965	1967	
5		Zhang Chunqiao	1971	1976	
6		Su Zhenhua	1976	1979	
7		Peng Chong	1979	1980	
8		Chen Guodong	1980	1985	
9		Rui Xingwen	1985	1987	
10		Jiang Zemin	27 November 1987	1 August 1989	
11		Zhu Rongji	1 August 1989	20 March 1991	
12		Wu Bangguo	20 March 1991	28 September 1994	
13		Huang Ju	28 September 1994	15 November 2002	
14		Chen Liangyu	15 November 2002	24 September 2006	
—		Han Zheng	24 September 2006	24 March 2007	
15		Xi Jinping	24 March 2007	27 October 2007	
16		Yu Zhengsheng	27 October 2007	20 November 2012	
17		Han Zheng	20 November 2012	29 October 2017	
18		Li Qiang	29 October 2017	28 October 2022	
19		Chen Jining	28 October 2022	Incumbent	

=== Chairpersons of Shanghai Municipal People's Congress ===
Chairman of the Standing Committee of the Shanghai Municipal People's Congress
- Incumbent; Dong Yunhu since January 15, 2023
- Status: Legislature leader
- Term length: Five years, renewable

Name	Took office	Left office
Yan Youmin	1979	1981
Hu Lijiao	1981	1988
Ye Gongqi (叶公琦)	1988	1998
Chen Tiedi (陈铁迪)	February 1998	February 2003
Gong Xueping (龚学平)	February 2003	January 2008
Liu Yungeng	January 2008	January 2013
Yin Yicui	February 2013	January 2020
Jiang Zhuoqing	January 20, 2020	January 15, 2023
Dong Yunhu	January 15, 2020	July 12, 2023
Huang Lixin	January 24, 2024	Incumbent

=== Mayors of Shanghai ===
Since communist victory in the Shanghai Campaign, Shanghai has been led by its Mayor and Party Secretary, all officeholders of which are members of the Chinese Communist Party.

No.	Officeholder	Term	Ref.
Mayor of the Shanghai Municipal People's Government
1	Chen Yi (1901–1972)	28 May 1949 – February 1955	
Mayor of the Shanghai Municipal People's Committee
(1)	Chen Yi (1901–1972)	February 1955 – November 1958	
2	Ke Qingshi (1902–1965)	November 1958 – April 1965	
3	Cao Diqiu (1909–1976)	November 1965 – February 1967	
Director of the Shanghai People's Commune Interim Committee
4	Zhang Chunqiao (1917–2005)	February 1967 – February 1967	
Director of the Shanghai Municipal Revolutionary Committee
(4)	Zhang Chunqiao (1917–2005)	February 1967 – October 1976	
5	Su Zhenhua (1912–1979)	October 1976 – January 1979	
6	Peng Chong (1915–2010)	January 1979 – December 1979	
Mayor of the Frontier Studiesai Municipal People's Government
(6)	Peng Chong (1915–2010)	December 1979 – March 1980	
7	Wang Daohan (1915–2005)	April 1981 – July 1985	
8	Jiang Zemin (1926–2022)	July 1985 – April 1988	
9	Zhu Rongji (1928–2026)	April 1988 – April 1991	
10	Huang Ju (1938–2007)	April 1991 – February 1995	
11	Xu Kuangdi (born 1936)	February 1995 – December 2001	
12	Chen Liangyu (born 1944)	December 2001 – February 2003	
13	Han Zheng (born 1955)	February 2003 – 26 December 2012	
14	Yang Xiong (1953–2021)	26 December 2012 – 17 January 2017	
15	Ying Yong (born 1957)	20 January 2017 – 13 February 2020	
16	Gong Zheng (born 1960)	23 March 2020 – 4 September 2026	
17	Zhu Zhongming (born 1972)	4 September 2026 – Incumbent	

=== Chairpersons of the Political Conference Shanghai Committee ===
Chairman of Shanghai Municipal Committee of the Chinese People's Political Consultative Conference
- Incumbent; Hu Wenrong since January 14, 2023
- Status: Local CPPCC leader
- Term length: Five years, renewable

1. Ke Qingshi (柯庆施): 1955–1958
2. Chen Pixian (陈丕显): 1958–1967
3. Peng Chong (彭冲): 1977–1979
4. Wang Yiping (王一平): 1979–1983
5. Prof. Li Guohao (李国豪): 1983–1988
6. Prof. Xie Xide (谢希德) (female): 1988–1993
7. Chen Tiedi (陈铁迪) (female): 1993–1998
8. Wang Liping (王力平): 1998–2003
9. Jiang Yiren (蒋以任): 2003–2008
10. Feng Guoqin (冯国勤): 2008–2013
11. Wu Zhiming (吴志明): 2013–2018
12. Dong Yunhu (董云虎): 2018–2023
13. Hu Wenrong (胡文容): 2023–incumbent

=== Chairpersons of the Shanghai Supervisory Committee ===
1. Liao Guoxun (廖国勋): January 2018 – March 2020
2. Liu Xuexin (刘学新): July 2020 – October 2022
3. Li Yangzhe (李仰哲): October 2022 – incumbent

== See also ==
- Circuit intendant of Shanghai
- Old City of Shanghai
- Politics of Beijing
- Politics of Chongqing
- Politics of Tianjin
- Zhuang Xiaotian
