= Wei Wenbo =

Chinese politician

- 魏文伯

Minister of Justice of the People's Republic of China
- In office 13 September 1979 – 4 May 1982
- Premier: Hua Guofeng; Zhao Ziyang
- Preceded by: Shi Liang
- Succeeded by: Liu Fuzhi

Deputy Secretary of the Central Commission for Discipline Inspection
- In office 22 December 1978 – 11 September 1982
- Secretary: Chen Yun

Member of the Central Advisory Commission
- In office 1983–1985
- Chairman: Deng Xiaoping

Vice-Minister of Justice (concurrently Party Secretary)
- In office December 1952 – February 1955
- Minister: Shi Liang

Personal details
- Born: 魏去非 Wèi Qùfēi; March 9, 1905 Huanggang, Hubei Province, Qing Empire
- Died: November 15, 1987 (aged 82) Shanghai, People's Republic of China
- Party: Chinese Communist Party (from 1926)
- Other political affiliations: Kuomintang (1925-1927)
- Spouse: Li Jingyi (李静一)
- Children: 6
- Education: Wuchang Chunghua University (Affiliate High School)
- Alma mater: Beiping Yuwen University
- Occupation: Politician, revolutionary, jurist, calligrapher

Wei Wenbo (Chinese: 魏文伯; pinyin: Wèi Wénbó; 1905–1987) was a Chinese Communist revolutionary and politician who played an extensive role in the building of China's legal system. He was also one of East China's most senior party leaders before being purged in the Cultural Revolution. Following his rehabilitation in 1979, he served as China's Minister of Justice and Deputy Secretary and Secretary-General of the Central Commission for Discipline Inspection before his retirement.

== Biography ==
=== Early life and activism ===
Wei was born into an educated peasant family in Xinzhou County (then part of Huanggang), Hubei, China on the 9th of March, 1905. After his father's death in 1921, he faced financial distress and could no longer afford school, and thus resorted to rigorous self-education at home. It was during this time when Wei was introduced to Marxist literature by his townsman Ye Wanhe (叶万鹤), a maternal cousin of Chen Tanqiu. In 1925, he joined both the Kuomintang's left wing and the Communist Youth League of China, organising a farmers' union in his hometown, shortly before he joined the Chinese Communist Party (CCP) in August 1926. His activities as the Organisation Department head of his local party branch included leading the workers of Yangluo in demanding better working conditions and organising an armed workers' self-defence team.

In 1927, upon hearing the news of the July 15 Incident, Wei transferred his self-defence team and farmers' union's rifles and silver dollars to He Long's Twentieth Army and proceeded to join the Nanchang Uprising as a staff officer, participating in the southward march to Shantou. After the uprising's failure, he escaped to Hubei and continued the underground struggle during the country's White Terror in Yichang.

In 1929, Wei was admitted to Beiping Yuwen University's political science school under an alias and subsequently involved himself in student revolutionary activities in Beiping (now Beijing), becoming the Secretary of the university's underground party branch. He then served as the Secretary-General of the CCP's Beiping Municipal Committee in 1930.

In the summer of 1933, Wei joined Feng Yuxiang's Counter-Japanese Army on the party's orders, serving as the Secretary of its Military Committee. In 1936, he covertly joined the Northeastern Army in Xi'an on the party's orders. He actively promoted Mao Zedong's anti-Japanese national united front policy as the propaganda member of the Northeast Army Party Working Committee, publishing news articles supporting the Communists' actions in the Xi'an Incident. Throughout his time in North China, he was arrested four times by Warlord and Kuomintang forces, participating in hunger strikes and contracting pulmonary tuberculosis while imprisoned.

=== Second Sino-Japanese War and the Chinese Revolution ===
In the outbreak of the Second Sino-Japanese War, Wei organised preparations for resistance efforts against the invading Japanese forces as the Party Committee Secretary for Yingshan County within his native province after returning from Shaanxi. He became the Chief of the United Front Section of the Jiangbei (江北) Command Post of the New Fourth Army in November 1939.

In 1940, Liu Shaoqi appointed Wei as the first magistrate of Dingyuan, Central China's first Anti-Japanese Democratic Government. Liu suggested he adopt his childhood literary name 'Wei Wenbo', which he used for the rest of his life. During his time as the county's leader, Wei implemented the 'Three Thirds System', reformed rural taxation, and organised defences against Japanese sweeps. Because he routinely wore a traditional scholar's cotton gown while organizing military defense, then New Fourth Army Deputy Commander Zhang Yunyi nicknamed Wei the ''Long Gown Commander'' (长褂司令).

In September 1941, Wei became both the Deputy Director and Party Group Secretary of the Office for Mutual Defence of Jinpu-Railway West Region, just after being elected as the region's President of the Assembly. In May 1942, the first and second sessions of the Assembly were held, during which 9 decrees and 17 resolutions were passed, including temporary measures which gave families of Chinese soldiers preferential treatment from the government, which boosted the popularity of the Communists in the areas they controlled. In August of 1942, his eldest son of sixteen from his first marriage, Wei Hongjue (魏宏觉), died while serving as an underground messenger for the CCP. Wei subsequently suffered from an immense amount of grief, and dedicated an elegiac poem to his fallen son.

In the summer of 1944, Wei enrolled in the Central China Bureau's Party School to study as part of the Yan'an Rectification Movement, working as a member of the school's propaganda committee as he was too sick to travel to Yan'an. After his studies, he served as Deputy Director and Party Secretary of the Wanjiang (Southern Anhui) Administrative Office, supervising the disarmament of surrendered local Japanese forces and organising the evacuation of the New Fourth Army's Seventh Division to Jiangsu.

Following the continuation of the Chinese Civil War in 1946, Wei concurrently served as Secretary-General and Head of Mass Mobilisation of the CCP Central Committee's East China Bureau, as well as a member of the East China Military and Political Committee. In May 1949, following the crossing of the Yangtze, he entered Shanghai alongside Deng Xiaoping, Chen Yi, and the rest of the East China Bureau, establishing the municipal takeover headquarters on Fuzhou Road.

=== After the founding of the People's Republic ===
After the Founding of the People's Republic of China, Wei took on multiple positions within the East China legal and party apparatus, serving in roles such as Procurator-General of the East China branch of the Supreme People's Procuratorate. In 1952, he founded and became the President of the East China University of Political Science and Law with the approval and backing of Marshal Chen Yi.

In November 1952, Wei was appointed as Vice Minister of Justice as well as Party Group Secretary of the Ministry of Justice. He was simultaneously made Secretary of the Supreme People's Court and Ministry of Justice's Joint Party Group. During this period, he led the drafting of the Organic Law of the People's Courts of the People's Republic of China among other bills, helping set the foundation of China's judicial system. A law pamphlet written by him around this time earned him the attention and praise of Mao Zedong, who ordered it to be published across China.

Wei was transferred to the Shanghai Government in 1955. In the same year, Wei was appointed as the Deputy Director of the CCP Central Committee's Leading Small Group for Schistosomiasis Control, later becoming its Director. He acted as the chief spokesperson of the Chinese government's efforts to eradicate schistosomiasis, which plagued rural China at the time. Wei coordinated medical research projects and took part in many on-the-ground eradication efforts with disease experts and barefoot doctors over a period of ten years, playing an important role in the disease's eradication in China. He also wrote a popular poem to promote awareness of disease prevention measures,《送瘟神三字经》in Chinese (Lit. 'The Three-Character Classic for Sending Away the Plague God').

Wei's time in the Shanghai Municipal Government saw him serve as Secretary of the Secretariat of the CCP Shanghai Municipal Committee and Vice Chairman of the Shanghai CPPCC. Right before the Anti-Rightist Campaign, Wei openly called for an offensive against ''intra-Party sectarianism and cronyism'', insisting that Party discipline rely on patient persuasion and "mild breeze and gentle rain" rather than factional coercion or ''crude'' struggle sessions.

In 1961, Wei was transferred to the East China Bureau of the CCP Central Committee again. He concurrently served as the Bureau's Alternate Secretary and Secretary-General before becoming a member of its Secretariat.

Throughout the Great Leap Forward and its aftermath, Wei personally exposed exaggerated crop yields in Maqiao Commune (present-day Minhang, Shanghai) in 1958, outright refused demands from Ke Qingshi to inflate suburban harvest statistics during the Lushan Conference, organised emergency famine relief efforts in Anhui in 1960, and went undercover in Anhui to personally investigate the state of the famine there, culminating in then Anhui First Secretary Zeng Xisheng's dismissal after he exposed the widespread unlawful abuses and mass starvation occurring in the province while at the Seven Thousand Cadres Conference in 1962.

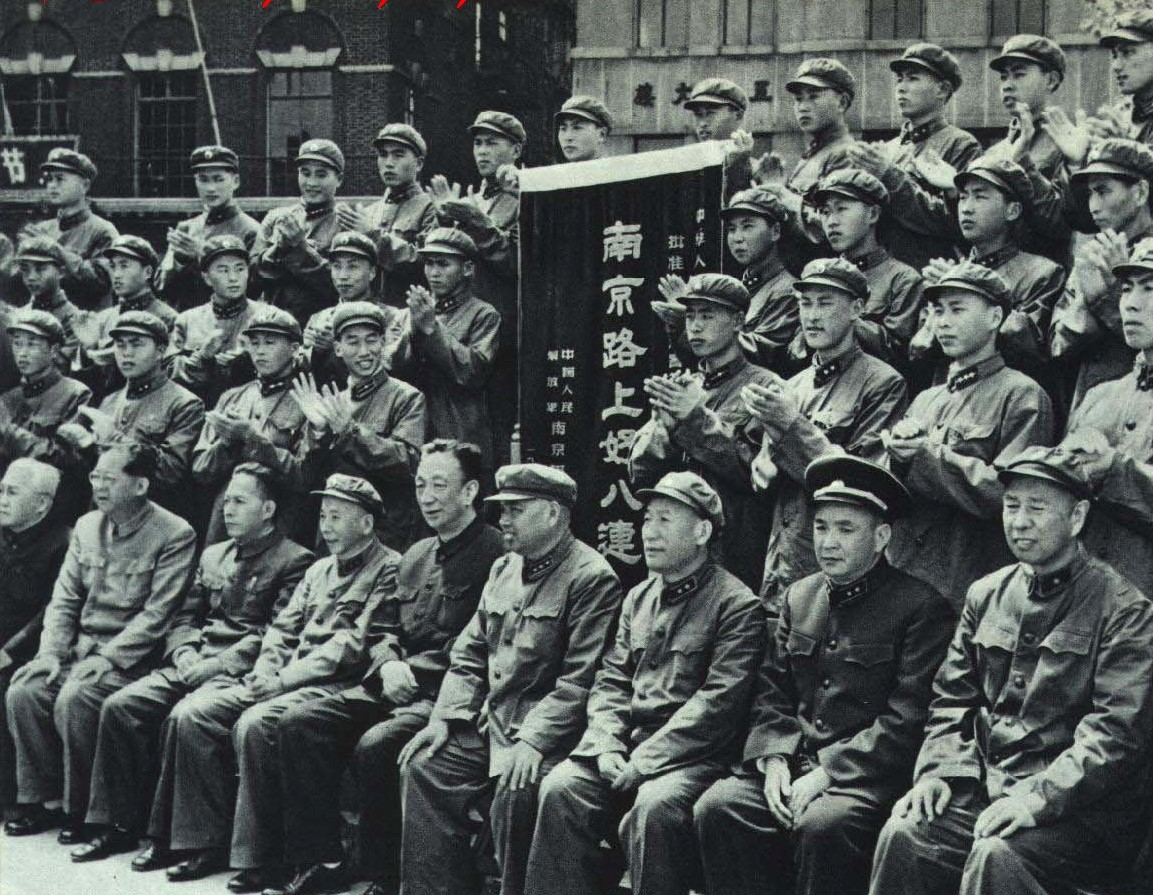
Wei Wenbo (front row, second from left, seated between Cao Diqiu and Chen Pixian) at the naming ceremony for the "Good Eighth Company'', a celebrated military unit, on Nanjing Road, Shanghai, 5 May 1963.

Ke's death in 1965 left the positions of Mayor of Shanghai as well as the First Secretary positions of both the East China Bureau and Shanghai Municipal Committee vacant. While Beijing chose not to appoint a new First Secretary of the East China Bureau, Wei was promoted to Secretary of the East China Bureau while his comrades Chen Pixian and Cao Diqiu took over as Shanghai's First Secretary and Mayor respectively, collectively forming the top leadership of Shanghai while Wei presided over the East China party apparatus's day-to-day affairs.

In late 1966, during a Central Work Conference in Beijing, Wei openly challenged Politburo Standing Committee member Chen Boda over the central leadership's backing of rebel factions, insisting that party members should be treated equally without factional bias. In internal leadership discussions, he warned that the radical ideologues in the Central Cultural Revolution Group were destabilising governance and damaging the national economy, criticising the disruption caused by frequent political campaigns to economic production and the livelihood of ordinary citizens. In 1967, Wei was completely ousted from power during the January Storm along with the rest of the Municipal Committee by the Gang of Four, leaving the East China Bureau defunct. As a result, he was stripped of all his posts and placed into solitary confinement alongside Chen and Cao at the Spanish villa of No. 71 Kangping Road.

Over 6 years in solitary confinement, Wei was subjected to over one hundred public struggle sessions and marathon sleep-deprivation interrogations, during which he collapsed from convulsions and possible cerebral hemorrhage during a continuous multi-day interrogation in March 1968. The Gang of Four branded him a "traitor," targeting his 1930s arrests and his role in the freeing of the ''61 Renegades'' from a Kuomintang prison in 1936, while systematically erasing the role he played in the eradication of snail-fever. Imprisoned once again, Wei adopted the personal sobriquet "Old Pine" (老松) to signify steadfast resistance. He was released from solitary confinement into house arrest in March 1973.

By 1979, Wei was thoroughly rehabilitated by the party and resumed work by joining the Central Commission for Discipline Inspection, serving as its Deputy Secretary and Secretary-General starting from December 1978 before being appointed as the Minister of Justice in September 1979. Wei's tenure as the Justice Minister was marked by the Trial of the Gang of Four and the restoration of China's heavily eroded legal system. He also barred former rebel faction members from working in the judicial system, re-established China's Law Press, and established what is now Legal Daily. Subsequently, he was elected as a representative to the 12th National Congress of the CCP and made a member of the Central Political and Legal Affairs Commission (CPLC). Wei also sat on Liu Shaoqi's Funeral Committee, which was formed in May 1980.

After retiring from his major posts in 1982, he was chosen to serve on the Central Advisory Commission (CAC) in October 1983, and was specially invited to the 13th National Congress of the CCP.

Wei Wenbo (right) vacationing with CAC Vice Chairman and fellow party elder Song Renqiong in Wuxi in 1986

=== Illness and death ===
Wei had suffered from strokes as early as 1980, as a result of overworking himself, feeling the need to make up for lost time after a decade of imprisonment. He initiated a proposal for his withdrawal from the CAC in 1985 at a party conference. In 1987, he insisted on attending the 13th National Congress of the CCP as a 'special invitee' despite his deteriorating health and Beijing's cold weather, attending all four of its plenary sessions and participating in its various group meetings in his wheelchair.

Wei Wenbo died in Shanghai due to illness on 15 November 1987, aged 82, only 11 days after his return from Beijing. His funeral was presided over by Jiang Zemin. He was eulogised as a 'time-tested proletarian revolutionary', a title given only to highly respected party elders and martyrs, acknowledging his years of participation in the CCP and its revolution.

A portion of his ashes was delivered to be stored in Babaoshan Revolutionary Cemetery on a special military charter plane, while the rest of his ashes were buried in Shanghai's Fushou Garden.

In 2004, a 520-square-meter tomb was built by the government in his hometown of Xinzhou, Wuhan to memorialise him.

== Personal life ==
Wei was a widely respected Chinese calligrapher. Chinese calligraphy had been his hobby since childhood. He was selected twice as an Honorary Director of the Chinese Calligraphers Association. His works have been selected for major calligraphy exhibitions both in China and abroad (notably Japan) and have been published in newspapers and magazines many times. They are collected or engraved in many museums, memorial halls and scenic spots across China, including within the Shanghai Botanical Garden. He also inscribed the masthead for the first iteration of Ezhou's municipal newspaper Ezhoubao (鄂州报) for his native province in 1984.

The former residence of Wei Wenbo in his hometown in Xinzhou was also the founding site of the Chinese Communist Party's branch in Western Huanggang (present-day Xinzhou, Wuhan). It has since been declared a protected site by the county government.

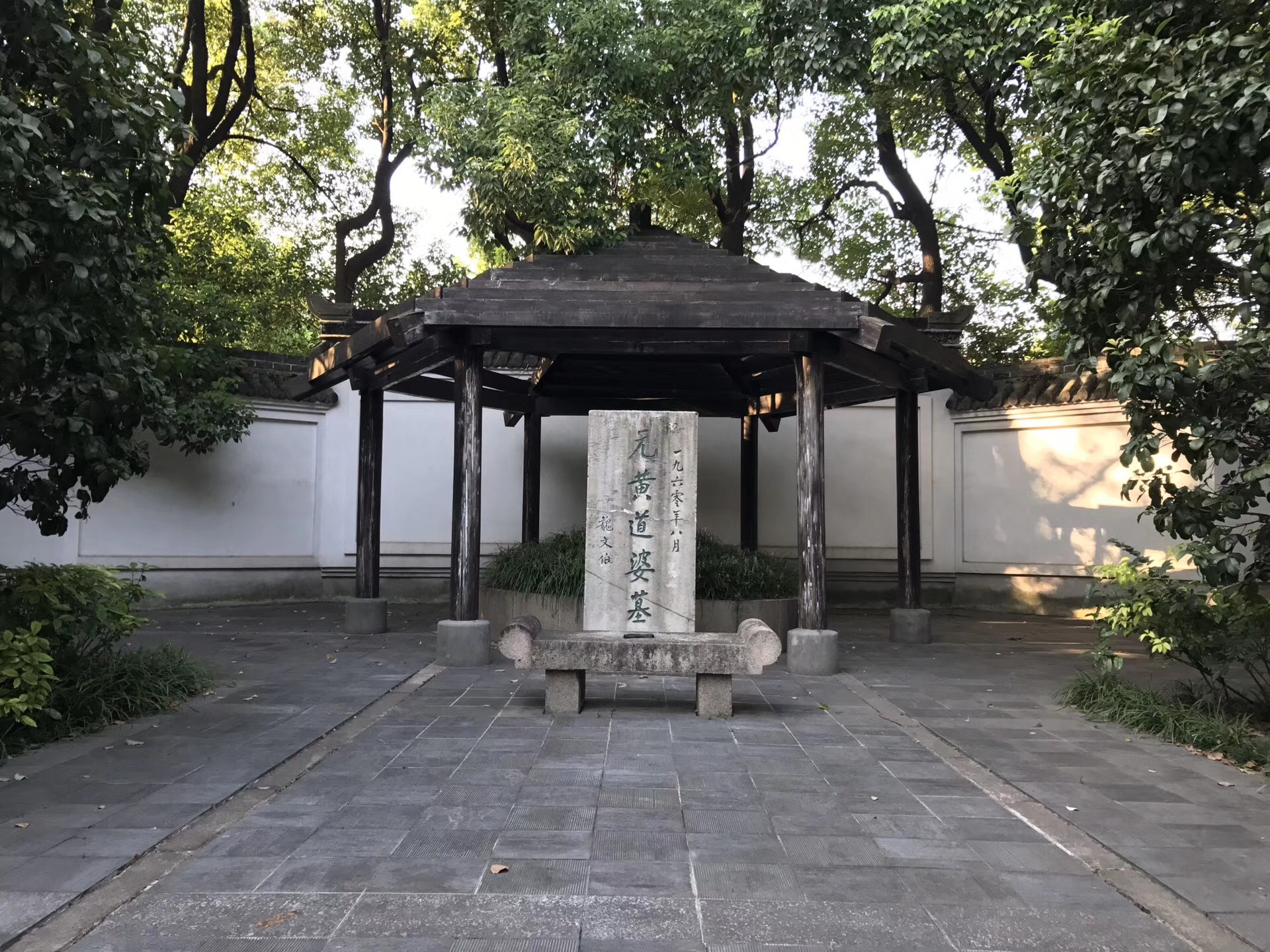
Huang Daopo's tombstone inscribed with Wei's calligraphy in Xuhui, Shanghai

Wei was also an educator. He first started teaching in 1926 when he opened an elementary school in his hometown using funds he received from selling off a parcel of his family land and a donation from his relative and later Eighth Route Army veteran Wei Menglin (alias Wang Baiping 王百评), where he and Ye Wanhe managed to enrol 40 peasant children. Aside from founding the ECUPL, he also served as the President of the Shanghai Institute of Socialism and taught political courses at Fudan University's Department of Law in 1958.

The Wenbo College at the ECUPL is named after him. The college was built as part of the university adopting a residential college system in 2017 and specialises in liberal arts education alongside politics, economics and law.

He was married to fellow revolutionary Li Jingyi (李静一). They had five children together. Li hailed from Anhui's Feidong County, and joined the Communist Party in 1932. She ran the East China Nursery, a school for the children of frontline cadres and revolutionary martyrs, together with Deng Liujin, mother of future Vice President Zeng Qinghong. Li would later serve as a Vice Chairwoman of the Shanghai Women's Federation and Deputy Party Secretary of Shanghai Medical College. She was notably a distant relative of Qing Dynasty statesman Li Hongzhang, belonging to the clan's Dao (道) generation.

== See also ==
- Legal history of China
- Ministry of Justice of the People's Republic of China
- East China University of Political Science and Law
- Central Commission for Discipline Inspection
- Legal Daily
- Schistosomiasis
- January Storm
- 61 Renegades

Academic offices
| Preceded by none | President of East China University of Political Science and Law; 1952–1955 | Succeeded by Zheng Wenqing |
Government offices
| Preceded by Shi Liang | Minister of Justice; 1979–1982 | Succeeded by Liu Fuzhi |
