= On the Abolition of Bourgeois Rights =

"On the Abolition of Bourgeois Rights" is a work written by Zhang Chunqiao. It was first published on September 15, 1958, in the sixth issue of the Liberation, a bimonthly magazine published in Shanghai, and later reprinted on October 13, 1958, by the People's Daily. It is considered one of the representative works of Zhang Chunqiao Thought and one of the principal documents of the Continuous Revolution Theory.

== Content ==
The article harshly criticized what it described as the "bourgeois right to protect inequality," arguing that "in reality, it is to replace the proletarian relation of equality with the rites and laws of the bourgeois hierarchical system." It highly praised the "communist supply system, which guaranteed the victory of the Chinese revolution," and advocated "thoroughly abolishing the bourgeois ideology of rights, establishing equal reciprocal relations with the masses, uniting all ranks completely as one, living, working, and laboring together, and striving collectively for socialism and communism."

== Reception ==
Mao Zedong: "Comrade Zhang Chunqiao's article appeared in the sixth issue of the Shanghai Liberation bimonthly, and is reprinted here for comrades to discuss. This issue needs discussion, because it is an important current issue. We believe Zhang's article is basically correct, but somewhat one-sided, that is, its explanation of the historical process is not complete. Yet he sharply raised the question and drew attention to it. The article is also simple and easy to read."

Philosophical Studies: "This article extols the supply system, criticizes the one-sided emphasis on stimulating personal material interests, and criticizes treating 'distribution according to labor' as an unshakable eternal principle. On these points, we fully agree. However, we feel that the article lacks theoretical analysis, has insufficient persuasiveness, and is somewhat one-sided, leaving many important issues unexplained."

Mao Zedong's Reading Notes Analysis: "Mao Zedong appreciated this article by Zhang Chunqiao and suggested that Zhang write another one. He later referred to it several times. For example, at the Zhengzhou Conference on November 6, 1958, Mao said: 'We have printed a booklet containing materials on the issue of abolishing bourgeois rights, published in the past month or two, including Zhang Chunqiao's article and those by several comrades. Read a few of them as examples to study the question of transition.' By specifically mentioning Zhang's article, Mao's emphasis on it is evident."

China Reform Information Database: "Basically correct and worth attention."

== See also ==
- Zhang Chunqiao Thought
- Continuous Revolution Theory
- Mao Zedong Thought
- Great Proletarian Cultural Revolution
- Gang of Four
- Zhang Chunqiao
