= Zhang Chunqiao =

Member of the Gang of Four (1917–2005)

Zhang Chunqiao Chang Chun-chiao
- 张春桥
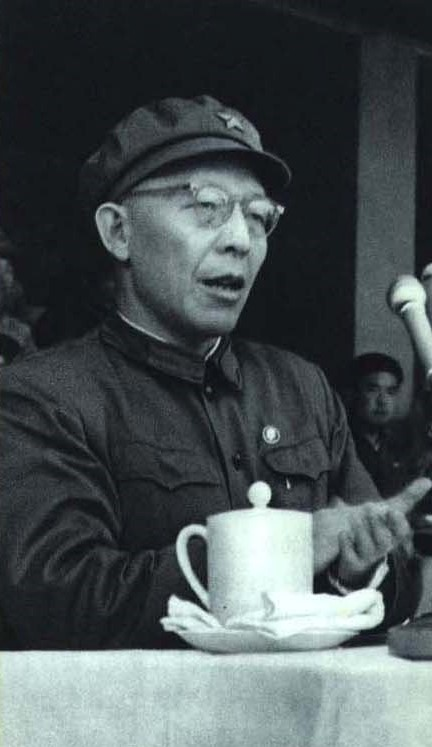

Vice Premier of China
- In office January 1975 – July 1977
- Premier: Zhou Enlai; Hua Guofeng
- Leader: Mao Zedong

Director of the Shanghai Revolutionary Committee (Note: Zhang was briefly the head of the Shanghai People's Commune in February 1967.)
- In office February 1967 – July 1977
- Preceded by: Cao Diqiu (as mayor)
- Succeeded by: Su Zhenhua

Personal details
- Born: 1 February 1917 Heze, Shandong, Republic of China
- Died: 21 April 2005 (aged 88) China
- Party: Chinese Communist Party (1938–1977; expelled)

Zhang Chunqiao
- Simplified Chinese: 张春桥
- Traditional Chinese: 張春橋
Transcriptions
Standard Mandarin
- Hanyu Pinyin: Zhāng Chūnqiáo
- Wade–Giles: Chang^{1} Ch'un^{1}-ch'iao^{2}
- IPA: [ʈʂáŋ ʈʂʰwə́ntɕʰjǎʊ]

Zhang Chunqiao (Chinese: 张春桥; 1 February 1917 – 21 April 2005), also spelled Chang Chun-chiao, was a Chinese political theorist, writer and politician who was a member of the radical group dubbed the "Gang of Four". A propaganda official in Shanghai after 1949, he came to Mao Zedong's attention in 1958 with an article attacking "bourgeois right", and became one of the leading organisers and theorists of the Cultural Revolution.

In 1966, Zhang became deputy head of the Cultural Revolution Group, and in February 1967 he proclaimed the short-lived Shanghai People's Commune, which was soon renamed the Shanghai Revolutionary Committee, with Zhang at its head. He joined the Politburo in 1969 and its Standing Committee in 1973, and by 1976 he was also a vice premier and director of the army's General Political Department. His standing was repeatedly challenged by accusations about his past, which the party used against him after his fall.

After Mao's death, Zhang was arrested in October 1976 with the other members of the Gang of Four. He remained silent throughout his trial in 1980, and in January 1981 he was sentenced to death with a two-year reprieve, later commuted to life imprisonment and then reduced to 18 years. He was released on medical parole in 1998, and died of cancer in 2005.

== Early life ==
Zhang was born in February 1917 in Juye County, Shandong. His great-grandfather and grandfather had both worked for many years as clerks who handled tax collection for the county government. His father Zhang Kaiyi graduated from the Shandong Public Medical School, and served as postmaster of Gaoyuan County and as head of the tobacco and liquor tax bureaus of Chenliu and Qi counties. Zhang was the eldest son, and had five younger brothers and a younger sister.

In 1927, Zhang and his mother Song Huiqing moved to Kaifeng to join his father, who was then serving in the army of Feng Yuxiang. There, Zhang finished primary school and entered the Minglun Middle School, but after Feng's defeat in the Central Plains War, his father returned to Jinan and Zhang went back to Juye. In the spring of 1931, at the age of 14, he moved to Jinan, and that autumn he entered the private Zhengyi Middle School. At school, he began writing poems and essays for newspapers and magazines in Jinan, Beiping and Shanghai, and by his third year his fees for these pieces covered his tuition and books. At the age of 15, he published a piece in the student supplement of the newspaper Minguo Ribao.

In the spring of 1933, Zhang, a senior student named Li Shuci and others founded a literary society, the Huadi Society, and Zhang published several pieces in its magazine. Li was a member of the Blue Shirts Society, and the name "Huadi" was both a transliteration of the English word "what" and an allusion to "Chinese fascisti". In 1956, Zhang said that he had at first thought of Li as just another young literary man, and that he had stopped writing for him after hearing that Li was a Blue Shirt. After the fall of the Gang of Four, the party used the episode as evidence that Zhang had been a Kuomintang agent.

Zhang graduated in the summer of 1934, and went to Beiping to sit an examination for railway trainees, but was rejected because of his severe short-sightedness. Back in Juye, he tried to make a living by writing, and in his literary criticism he sought attention by attacking well-known writers, among them Dai Wangshu, Lao She and Zang Kejia.

== Shanghai literary career ==
On 12 May 1935, Zhang left home without telling his family and went to Shanghai, where he stayed with the writers Chen Baichen and Yu Heiding. He soon found work as a proofreader at the Shanghai Magazine Company, but was dismissed because his punctuation of a classical text was full of errors. In October 1935, he joined the League of Left-Wing Writers and a leftist social science league.

After the league was dissolved, its members divided over the rival slogans of "national defence literature" and "mass literature of the national revolutionary war". On 15 March 1936, at the age of 19, Zhang published an article under the pen name Di Ke in Huoju, the supplement of the newspaper Da Wan Bao, in which he supported Zhou Yang's slogan of "national defence literature" and criticised Xiao Jun's novel Village in August as not true to life. Lu Xun, who had written the novel's preface, replied on 16 April with the essay "The Concession in March", defending Xiao Jun and mocking Di Ke, and Zhang then wrote to Lu Xun to defend himself. The supplement's editor Cui Wanqiu was later identified as an agent of the Nationalist intelligence service, and after 1976 the party accused Zhang of having attacked Lu Xun under Cui's direction.

In April 1936, Zhang joined a self-organised committee of probationary communists in Shanghai, which a man known as Lao Song had recruited him into. The group was later ordered to dissolve by a representative of the Chinese Communist Party (CCP), but Zhang counted his membership of it as joining the party. Chen Donglin notes that the procedure involved no formal screening or application.

== Yan'an and the war ==
After the Japanese attack on Shanghai in August 1937, Zhang left the city in September and returned to Jinan, where he stayed with Zhao Fucheng, a fellow townsman and former colleague of his father. According to the party's later account, Zhao was an agent of the Blue Shirts' Shandong leader Qin Qirong. In December 1937, shortly before the Japanese took Jinan, Zhang left Zhao's home for Yan'an, and Zhao later became police chief of Jinan under the Japanese-sponsored regime and gave Zhang's father a post. The party's official account after 1976 held that Zhang had infiltrated the communist base areas on Qin Qirong's orders, under Zhao's cover.

Zhang left Juye with his younger brother Zhang Qiuqiao in mid-December 1937, and they arrived in Yan'an on 7 January 1938. He was assigned to the political department of the Shaanbei Public School as secretary of the editorial committee of its magazine. In August 1938, he joined the CCP, and he became a full member in February 1939. In 1939, he became head of propaganda for the magazine of the school's Guanzhong branch, and later chief of the propaganda and then the student-life sections of North China United University. On 1 July 1941, he wrote the lyrics of "Song of Mao Zedong", which was set to music by Lu Su and became popular in the communist base areas, though it was criticised during the Yan'an Rectification Movement and again in 1951.

In 1942, Zhang was assigned to the propaganda department of the party's Beiyue district committee in the Jin-Cha-Ji Border Region, and in September 1943 he became deputy chief of the propaganda section of the Jin-Cha-Ji sub-bureau. In 1944, he joined the editorial board of the Jin-Cha-Ji Daily, becoming its deputy editor-in-chief in June, and in September 1945 he became head of its editorial department. When the party committee of Shijiazhuang launched its newspaper on 18 November 1947, Zhang became its editor-in-chief and a member of the city's party committee. In July 1948, he became president of the newspaper and secretary-general of the city government, under mayor Ke Qingshi.

== Shanghai, 1949–1966 ==
In May 1949, Zhang entered Shanghai with the People's Liberation Army. In March 1950, he was appointed managing director of the East China branch of the New China News Agency. He was also deputy president of Jiefang Daily, and in October 1951 he succeeded Yun Yiqun as its president. He was an honorary professor at Fudan University in the 1950s. During the "new Three-anti" campaign of 1953, the regional leaders Tan Zhenlin and Chen Pixian criticised the paper for attacking cadres too harshly, and Zhang made a self-criticism.

In January 1954, Zhang visited the Soviet Union in a press delegation led by Deng Tuo, and asked his former superior Deng to help him move to the People's Daily in Beijing. According to his daughter, the family had already packed when the move was called off, after Chen Yi asked Pan Hannian to keep him in Shanghai. In 1955, Zhang became editor-in-chief of Jiefang Daily. During the campaign against Hu Feng that year, he noticed a speech by Yao Wenyuan and invited him to work with the paper. He also took part in reforming the press and literary circles, and in the campaigns against rightists.

In April 1957, Zhang became a full-time member of the Standing Committee of the Shanghai party committee, in effect a senior secretary to its first secretary Ke Qingshi. The sociologist Andrew G. Walder writes that his association with Ke was crucial in shaping his political concerns over the following decade. As a cultural journalist in Shanghai, Zhang warned against the risk of sugarcoated bullets to newly victorious communist revolutionaries. He wrote that while "enemies with guns" could be seen at a glance, the "fragrant breezes" of sugarcoated bullets required longer-term vigilance. Zhang wrote that revolutionaries must not neglect small affairs like "handing over a lost penny, using a wash basin for eight years, and wearing clothes that have been patched up thirty-eight times."

In 1958, Zhang met Mao in Hangzhou, a conversation that he later described in a letter to his daughter in 1992. After the start of the Great Leap Forward, he published "Destroy the Ideology of Bourgeois Right", which criticised the graded wage system and praised the wartime supply system. Mao took notice of the article, and ordered it to be reprinted in the People's Daily on 13 October 1958, with an accompanying editor's note that expressed his mild approval. In the article, Zhang praised the egalitarian practice of the Red Army in the 1930s, including its communist relations not only among its own members but with the masses. He argued that comrades who had lived under the supply system had not envied wage labour, but that this system of equal relations had been attacked by the ideology of bourgeois right. "The core of the ideology of the bourgeois right," he wrote, "is the wage system."

Zhang was a major proponent of amateurs creating artistic and literary works. As part of this effort, in 1958 he cut the payments to writers by 50 per cent for all publications controlled by his department, an initiative that was later imitated at the national level. He became head of the propaganda department of the Shanghai party committee in May 1963, and was made a full secretary of the committee by March 1965.

According to Radio Free Asia, Zhang helped Mao to regain a political foothold in Shanghai after Mao lost influence following the Great Leap Forward, and allowed the city to serve as Mao's base for launching the Cultural Revolution. He hosted Jiang Qing's work on the revolutionary model operas in Shanghai. In 1965, with Mao and Jiang Qing, he organised the criticism of Wu Han's play Hai Rui Dismissed from Office in Shanghai, and guided Yao Wenyuan in writing the critique, which was published in the newspaper Wenhui Bao in November 1965.

== Cultural Revolution ==
=== Shanghai ===
In early 1966, on Mao's instructions, Zhang helped to revise the summary of Jiang Qing's forum on literature and art in the armed forces and the May 16 Notification, two of the founding documents of the Cultural Revolution. When the Cultural Revolution Group was formed on 28 May 1966, he became its deputy head, and he was regarded as Jiang Qing's right-hand man. At the 11th plenary session of the 8th Central Committee in August 1966, he took part in the criticism of Liu Shaoqi. On 18 December 1966, he told the student rebel leader Kuai Dafu to denounce Liu publicly by name, and Kuai later recalled that Wang Li had told him in 1991 that Zhang had acted on Mao's instructions.

On 10 November 1966, Shanghai mayor Cao Diqiu had a train of rebel workers bound for Beijing stopped at the Anting siding outside the city. Zhang arrived from Beijing the next day, and, against the instructions of the Shanghai party committee and of the Cultural Revolution Group's adviser Tao Zhu, he signed the five demands of the Workers' Headquarters led by Wang Hongwen. The demands included recognition of the organisation as legal and of the journey to Beijing as a revolutionary act, and a public self-criticism by Cao Diqiu. Cao was reportedly furious, complaining that Zhang "signs and catches us with our pants down", while Zhang replied that the central issue was not the maintenance of production but the attitude of leaders towards mass organisations. Mao later approved his action, saying that he could "act first and report later", and Zhang was not held to account.

On 3 January 1967, Mao sent Zhang back to Shanghai, where he, Yao Wenyuan and Wang Hongwen led the January Storm, which overthrew the city's party committee under Chen Pixian and set off seizures of power across the country. Walder argues that the seizure of power was not a takeover of the municipal administration by workers' organisations, but an effort organised by Zhang to bring mass political action under control. On 28 January, a rebel group known as the Red Revolutionaries tried to "bombard" Zhang, but collapsed after Mao dictated an urgent telegram from the Cultural Revolution Group in his support. On 5 February 1967, Zhang proclaimed the Shanghai People's Commune, telling its founding rally that "we also have the strong PLA standing at our side". Walder estimates that the commune was probably supported by less than a quarter of Shanghai's politically active working population.

On 12 February, Mao reportedly said that communes were too weak to suppress counter-revolution, and the following week the commune announced that it would be renamed the Shanghai Municipal Revolutionary Committee. Zhang had returned to Beijing on 12 February, and at a Politburo meeting at Huairen Hall on 16 February, his overthrow of Chen Pixian was fiercely criticised by Tan Zhenlin. When Zhang told him that the masses would have to be consulted and that the party was no longer of use, Tan angrily accused the Cultural Revolution Group of trying to purge all the veteran cadres, and other senior leaders joined in the criticism. That night, Zhang, Yao and Wang Li reported the meeting to Mao, who struck back, and the veterans' protest was labelled the "February Countercurrent". Zhang returned to Shanghai on 18 February, and with Mao's support he became chairman of the new revolutionary committee. In a televised speech on 24 February, he said that he had met Mao three times and had received his full support.

Zhang's post combined the former roles of mayor and party secretary, and this structure lasted until the post of party secretary was restored in 1971. Walder writes that his authority rested on the support of the People's Liberation Army, the approval of the party centre and the Workers' Headquarters. In 1967 and 1968, his duties as deputy head of the Cultural Revolution Group often took him away from Shanghai, to Beijing and to other provinces.

Early on 12 April 1968, rebel groups at the Second Military Medical University and the newspaper Wenhui Bao put up slogans across Shanghai attacking Zhang, which called for exposing him as a "black backer" and declared that Di Ke's attack on Lu Xun deserved death. According to the historian Song Yongyi, Zhang had backed a rival faction at the medical university against Qiu Huizuo, one of Lin Biao's generals, who then supported the university's "Red Flag" group in attacking Zhang and collecting material against him. That night, at Jiang Qing's request, the army's leadership ordered troops not to take part, and the campaign subsided.

=== Lin Biao and the 9th Congress ===
In early 1969, Mao rejected the political report that Chen Boda had drafted for the 9th Party Congress, and the congress instead used a draft by Zhang and Yao Wenyuan, which Mao revised several times. The report was built on the theory of continuing the revolution under the dictatorship of the proletariat, but Lin Biao, who delivered it, did not change a word and refused to sign it. In the elections to the Central Committee, Jiang Qing, Kang Sheng, Zhang and Yao received ten or more votes short of a full tally, because Huang Yongsheng, Wu Faxian and other generals had told some army delegates not to vote for them. Zhang asked for an investigation, but Mao stopped it, and the conflict between Lin Biao's group and Jiang Qing's grew sharper. At the first plenary session of the new Central Committee in April 1969, Zhang was elected to the Politburo.

On 25 April 1970, Mao took Zhang to Suzhou to visit Lin Biao, and asked Lin whom he would hand over to in the future, adding, "What do you think of Little Zhang?" Lin did not answer, and after a while said that the party should rely on Huang Yongsheng, Wu Faxian, Li Zuopeng and Qiu Huizuo, who had followed Mao since their youth. On 14 August 1970, at a meeting with Chen Boda, Kang Sheng and Wu Faxian on revising the constitution, Zhang argued with Wu over the description of Mao as having developed Marxism–Leninism "with genius, creatively and comprehensively". Wu reported the dispute to Ye Qun.

At the second plenary session of the 9th Central Committee at Lushan, Lin Biao spoke of Mao's "genius" in his opening speech on 23 August 1970, criticising Zhang without naming him, as part of the campaign by his supporters over the post of state chairman. In group meetings over the next two days, Zhang was fiercely attacked, with Xu Shiyou calling for the overthrow of "all careerists and conspirators". Mao, however, defended him, telling Huang Yongsheng on 30 August that Zhang "has no weapon in his hands" and asking the generals to let him watch Zhang for three more years. The plenum turned against Lin's supporters, Chen Boda was purged, and Wu Faxian and Ye Qun were made to write self-criticisms. A 1971 document of Lin Biao's group called for exposing Zhang as a traitor. After Zhou Enlai announced Lin's death in the Lin Biao incident of September 1971, Zhang paid for Moutai to toast the members of the Politburo. That year, he also argued for a modest decentralisation in the supervision of the arts.

=== Standing Committee ===
In February 1972, Zhang and Zhou Enlai hosted US president Richard Nixon at a banquet in Shanghai, where Nixon's toast honoured them both. On 30 August 1973, at the first plenary session of the 10th Central Committee, he was elected to the Politburo Standing Committee.

In 1973, when Zhou Enlai and his wife Deng Yingchao accompanied French president Georges Pompidou to Shanghai, Deng visited nearly all the new and veteran cadres in the city's party compound except Zhang. She remarked publicly that there was one home she had not visited, and that everyone could guess why, a reference to the alleged wartime betrayal of Zhang's wife Wen Jing. Zhang and Wen Jing separated soon afterwards. At the end of 1973, Zhang was a member of the group that criticised Zhou's diplomacy as "rightist capitulationism". In December 1974, at his last meeting with Mao on the appointments for the Fourth National People's Congress, Zhou raised Zhang's "historical problem" to block him from becoming premier.

=== 1975–1976 ===
On 5 January 1975, a central party notice appointed Deng Xiaoping chief of the general staff and Zhang director of the General Political Department. Zhang later complained to Wang Hongwen that he had no real control over army appointments, calling his department "nothing but a rubber stamp". In 1975, he entered the top ranks of the state leadership. By October 1976, he was a member of the Politburo Standing Committee, a vice premier of the State Council and director of the General Political Department.

In the party journal Red Flag in 1975, Zhang published "On Exercising All-Round Dictatorship Over the Bourgeoisie", which argued that the dictatorship of the proletariat must be exercised in every sphere because bourgeois right, commodity exchange and the wage system persisted under socialism. On 1 March 1975, in a speech to the heads of the army's political departments, he declared that empiricism was the main danger, and Jiang Qing and Yao Wenyuan joined in attacking Zhou and Deng, until Mao's criticism brought the campaign against empiricism to a halt. In December 1975, Zhang visited Democratic Kampuchea, and on his return he was met by Deng, but relations between the two were by then very cold.

Zhou Enlai died on 8 January 1976. At a Politburo meeting on 12 January, Zhang proposed that Ye Jianying give the eulogy at Zhou's memorial service, but Ye declined and proposed Deng instead, and most members agreed. After the appointment of Hua Guofeng as acting premier was announced on 2 February 1976, Zhang wrote a note titled "Feelings", which prosecutors at his trial later presented as evidence of his resentment at Hua's appointment. The historian Li Xun argues that the note was aimed at Deng's replacement rather than at Hua, and Zhang's daughter Weiwei has said that he had no personal ambition and saw himself as Mao's secretary.

On 25 March 1976, Wenhui Bao published a front-page report that was widely read as an attack on Zhou for trying to restore Deng to power. Days later, students and workers in Nanjing took to the streets, and slogans calling for Zhang to be dragged out and exposed as a careerist and conspirator appeared in the city and on trains bound for Beijing. The protests culminated in the Tiananmen incident of April 1976, and at a Politburo meeting on 5 April, Zhang accused Deng to his face of being another Imre Nagy.

== Allegations about his past ==
Questions about Zhang's political past followed him throughout his career. In 1955, he asked the Shanghai party committee to recognise 1936 as the date of his party membership, but the answers of those questioned were inconsistent and did not support his claim. In Shanghai, rival rebel factions campaigned to "bombard Zhang Chunqiao", accusing him of having a traitorous past and attacking his writings of the 1930s. Kang Sheng made allegations against him in 1975. Nevertheless, Chen writes that Mao never seriously criticised him in this period. In 1977, after his arrest, a central party document labelled him an agent of the Kuomintang, although Chen argues that the evidence did not prove that he had ever been arrested by the Nationalists.

== Arrest, trial and imprisonment ==
After Mao's death on 9 September 1976, Zhang was one of the four remaining members of the Politburo Standing Committee, with Hua Guofeng, Wang Hongwen and Ye Jianying. On the evening of 6 October 1976, Hua, Ye and Wang Dongxing had Zhang, Jiang Qing, Wang Hongwen and Yao Wenyuan, the other members of the Gang of Four, arrested at Huairen Hall in Zhongnanhai, under the pretext of a meeting. In April 1977, Zhang was moved to Qincheng Prison. In July 1977, the Central Committee expelled the four from the party and removed them from all their posts.

Zhang was one of ten defendants in the trial of the Lin Biao and Jiang Qing cliques, which opened before a special court on 20 November 1980. He remained completely silent throughout the trial, defying the court with his indifference. Like Jiang Qing, he was defiant in court. On 25 January 1981, the court sentenced him to death with a two-year reprieve. He was also deprived of his political rights for life. In January 1983, his sentence was commuted to life imprisonment. In December 1997, it was reduced to 18 years' imprisonment, with ten years' deprivation of political rights.

== Later life and death ==
In January 1998, Zhang was released on medical parole. The Independent wrote that he then lived in obscurity in Shanghai, while People's Daily Online reported that he lived with Wen Jing in Jiangyin, Jiangsu. In letters to his family from prison, he wrote that communism would surely be realised, and according to his daughter, he never lost his communist convictions. The Chinese University of Hong Kong Press published the letters in 2015.

Zhang died of cancer on 21 April 2005, at the age of 88. The South China Morning Post reported that he died in Beijing. The Xinhua News Agency announced his death on 10 May, 19 days later, describing him as one of the principal culprits of the counter-revolutionary cliques of Lin Biao and Jiang Qing. There had been earlier reports that he had died in prison in the early 1990s.

== Family ==
Zhang's wife Wen Jing was born Li Ruowen in 1916, the daughter of a deputy manager of the Tianjin branch of the Bank of China. A graduate of the journalism department of Yenching University, she met Zhang in the spring of 1943, when he was working in the propaganda department of the Beiyue district committee. She was wounded and captured during a Japanese sweep at the end of 1943, and according to Zheng Zhong's biography of Zhang, she took part in writing anti-communist material and in anti-communist performances while held in Shijiazhuang. Song Yongyi writes that she wavered in captivity but did not betray her organisation, and that the party approved her readmission in 1949. Shortly before the Japanese surrender in 1945, she left Japanese control and joined Zhang at the Jin-Cha-Ji Daily, where she took the name Wen Jing. The couple married in Zhangjiakou in 1947.

After Zhang rose to power in Shanghai, Wen Jing also gained political standing. Under political pressure over her past, the two divorced in 1973, with the approval of the party centre, but without public announcement. Their daughter Weiwei has said that they never obtained a legal divorce certificate. After Zhang's arrest, the official account accused Wen Jing of having surrendered and served as a Japanese agent, and accused Zhang of shielding her. She later developed Alzheimer's disease and was treated at Zhongshan Hospital in Shanghai.

Zhang and Wen Jing had four children, three daughters and a son. Their eldest daughter Zhang Weiwei was born on 6 January 1947. Zhang's younger brother Zhang Qiuqiao was a bureau chief and deputy editor-in-chief of the Liberation Army Daily, and he was placed under investigation after Zhang's arrest.

== Assessments ==
Traditional CCP histories portrayed Zhang as the "dog-headed military adviser" of the Gang of Four, and as a sinister careerist and conspirator who sought to usurp the party and state. Veteran revolutionaries dismissed him as a mere "petty literatus" and "petty journalist", and after joining the Standing Committee, Zhang himself asked his daughter which base area he had opened up, which army he had built and which battle he had won. General Xu Shiyou mocked him in a rhyme as a bespectacled man with a briefcase who was good at summing up and theorising, but who ran to the rear when fighting began.

Walder describes Zhang as a complex political figure, "both instigator and suppressor of political conflict, alternately champion and enemy of rebellion", who was throughout a protector of the ideals of his branch of Marxism. The US-based researcher Chen Guide called him "the spirit of the Cultural Revolution", and Song Yongyi described him as "the true inheritor of Mao Zedong Thought". Song has also argued that Zhang was a co-creator of Mao's late ideas rather than merely their interpreter, and that it would be naive to see him as a pure revolutionary idealist. The historian Gao Wenqian called him the true heir of Mao's late thought, and a political figure rather than an opportunist who trimmed his sails to the wind. The political scientist David Zweig said that many Chinese came to see Zhang as a power-seeking politician rather than a theorist, whose ideas conflicted with economic reform. Writing after his death, the journalist Huang Zhong regretted that Zhang had left no memoirs, since people deprived of political rights in mainland China also lost their freedom of publication.

== Works ==
=== Major writings ===
- "Destroy the Ideology of Bourgeois Right" (1958), reprinted in the People's Daily on 13 October 1958
- Political report to the 9th Party Congress (1969), drafted with Yao Wenyuan and delivered by Lin Biao
- "On Exercising All-Round Dictatorship Over the Bourgeoisie" (1975), first published in Red Flag, 1975, no. 4

=== Collections ===
- Zhang Chunqiao's Prison Letters to His Family (Hong Kong: Chinese University of Hong Kong Press, 2015)

== Reading list ==
- Zhang Chunqiao Reference Archive
- "On Exercising All-Round Dictatorship over the Bourgeoisie"

Political offices
Preceded by Cao Diqiu as Mayor of Shanghai	Chairman of the Revolutionary Committee of Shanghai; 1967–1976	Succeeded by Su Zhenhua
Preceded by Deng Xiaoping	First-ranking Vice Premier of China; 1976	Succeeded by Li Xiannian
Party political offices
Preceded by Chen Pixian; Vacant since 1967	Party Secretary of Shanghai; 1971–1976	Succeeded by Su Zhenhua
Military offices
Preceded by Li Desheng; Vacant since 1970	Director of the General Political Department of the People's Liberation Army; 1975–1976	Succeeded by Wei Guoqing; Vacant until 1977
