= Energy Development Trends and Major Energy Conservation Measures =

1989 article by Jiang Zemin

Energy Development Trends and Major Energy Conservation Measures (Chinese: 能源发展趋势及主要节能措施) is a paper published in the Journal of Shanghai Jiao Tong University in March 1989 by Jiang Zemin, then Party Secretary of Shanghai and a part-time professor at Shanghai Jiao Tong University. The paper is included in Jiang Zemin's collection of essays, Research on China's Energy Issues.

== Background ==
In 1989, Jiang Zemin, then Secretary of the Shanghai Municipal Party Committee, turned 63 and was about to retire. Jiang Zemin thought as Vice Chairman of the Standing Committee of the National People's Congress or Vice Chairman of the National Committee of the Chinese People's Political Consultative Conference were unattractive and wanted to become a professor at his alma mater, Shanghai Jiaotong University. Although Jiang Zemin could use his position as Secretary of the Shanghai Municipal Party Committee to secure a seat, he preferred to achieve it through his academic achievements.

Afterwards, Jiang Zemin submitted his resume and two papers to Shanghai Jiaotong University. After review, the university decided to hire Jiang Zemin as a professor. On the afternoon of March 24, Jiang Zemin rushed to the Xuhui campus and was hired as a part-time professor of electrical engineering. After the hiring ceremony, he gave an academic report entitled "Energy Development Trends and Major Energy-Saving Measures" on the first floor of Bao Zhaolong Library. He talked about the energy problems emerging in the economic development of the Yangtze River Delta. The lecture hall was packed and Jiang Zemin also used English in this report. Based on this speech, Jiang Zemin personally compiled a paper with the same title. The manuscript was then sent back and forth between him and the journal editorial department several times. After being revised, it was finally published in the Journal of Shanghai Jiao Tong University, Issue 3, 1989.

== Content ==
“Energy Development Trends and Major Energy-Saving Measures” reviewed the history of world energy development and looked forward to future energy development trends. This paper also proposed energy-saving measures based on Jiang Zemin's experience working at FAW.

== Follow-up ==
In the same year, Jiang Zemin delivered a second report at Jiaotong University, which was about the development of the microelectronics industry. Soon after the two reports were delivered, Jiang Zemin went to Beijing to serve as General Secretary of the Central Committee.

In 2009, Jiang Zemin mentioned during his inspection of the Second Institute of China National Machinery Industry Corporation that “At the beginning of 1989, I thought that I would soon retire and I thought I should become a professor. So I wrote a report to President Zhu Wuhua and Dean Zhang Zhongjun. They said they welcome me, but as a professor, I have to make a report. I made a report on the main energy-saving measures in the field of energy and development trends. This report was unanimously approved by hundreds of professors.”
