= Sugarcoated bullets =

Chinese Communist Party term for consumer temptations

- Simplified Chinese: 糖衣炮弹
Transcriptions
Standard Mandarin
- Hanyu Pinyin: Tángyī pàodàn

Sugarcoated bullets is a Mao Zedong-era political term in China used to describe the risk that revolutionaries might succumb to easy-living and consumer pleasures after the immediate success of the Chinese Communist Revolution. Warning against sugarcoated bullets was a major theme of the Three Antis Campaign in 1951 and the later Campaign to Emulate the Good Eighth Company of Nanjing Road, which was held up as an example for its resistance to the consumer pleasures of Shanghai in the immediate aftermath of the success of Chinese Communist Revolution.

== Concept ==
Mao Zedong first described the concept of sugarcoated bullets in his March 1949 Report to the Second Plenary Session of the 7th Central Committee of the Chinese Communist Party (CCP). Mao's conclusion to the speech cautioned against an immediate transition to socialism that might put the coalition formed via New Democracy at risk. Mao described the Chinese Communist Revolution as "a brief prologue to a long drama" in which socialism could be achieved through hard work.

In this context, Mao warned revolutionaries against succumbing to "love of pleasure and distaste for hard living." Having failed to defeat the revolution through violence, the bourgeoisie might, according to Mao, use the "sugarcoated bullets" of flattery and temptation to undermine the revolutionary commitment developed during the preceding decades.

The city of Shanghai was a primary site for worries about sugarcoated bullets following the success of the Chinese Communist Revolution. Rural CCP cadres entering the city were exposed to new forms of consumer pleasure not previously available to them. Zhang Chunqiao (at the time a journalist writing about culture in Shanghai, later a member of the Gang of Four), wrote that while "enemies with guns" can be perceived at a moment's glance," the "fragrant breezes" of sugarcoated bullets required longer term vigilance. Zhang wrote that revolutionaries must not neglect small affairs like "handing over a lost penny, using a wash basin for eight years, and wearing clothes that have been patched up thirty-eight times."

Warnings about the risk of sugarcoated bullets were a major theme of the 1951 Three Antis Campaign.

During the Great Leap Forward-era Campaign to Emulate the Good Eighth Company of Nanjing Road, the eponymous People's Liberation Army company was promoted as an example of resisting sugarcoated bullets. That company, charged with securing the main shopping boulevard of Shanghai, was praised for overcome the consumerist temptations of metropolitan Shanghai. Stories of their example were presented in the form of plays, and later the 1964 film Sentinels Under Neon Lights.

== See also ==
- Ideology of the Chinese Communist Party
- History of China (1949–1976)
- List of campaigns of the Chinese Communist Party
