= Mayor of Shanghai =

Mayor of the Shanghai Municipal People's Government
- 上海市人民政府市长
- National emblem of China

- Flag of China
- Incumbent; Zhu Zhongming since 4 September 2026
- Shanghai Municipal People's Government
- Type: Head of government
- Status: Provincial and ministerial-level official
- Reports to: Shanghai Municipal People's Congress and its Standing Committee
- Nominator: Presidium of the Shanghai Municipal People's Congress
- Appointer: Shanghai Municipal People's Congress
- Term length: Five years, renewable
- Inaugural holder: Chen Yi
- Formation: 28 May 1949
- Deputy: Deputy Mayors; Secretary-General

The mayor of Shanghai, officially the Mayor of the Shanghai Municipal People's Government, is the head of Shanghai Municipality and leader of the Shanghai Municipal People's Government.

The mayor is elected by the Shanghai Municipal People's Congress, and responsible to it and its Standing Committee. The mayor is a provincial level official and is responsible for the overall decision-making of the municipal government. The mayor is assisted by an executive vice mayor as well as several vice mayors. The mayor generally serves as the deputy secretary of the Shanghai Municipal Committee of the Chinese Communist Party and as a member of the CCP Central Committee. The mayor the second-highest-ranking official in the city after the secretary of the CCP Shanghai Committee. The current mayor is Zhu Zhongming, who took office on 4 September 2026.

== List of mayors ==
=== Republic of China ===
No.	Officeholder	Term	
No.	Officeholder	Took office	Left office
Mayor of the Shanghai Special Municipal Government
1	Huang Fu (1883–1936)	7 July 1927	14 August 1927
–	Wu Zhenxiu (1883–1966)	15 August 1927	16 September 1927
2	Zhang Dingfan (1891–1945)	17 September 1927	31 March 1929
3	Zhang Qun (1889–1990)	1 April 1929	29 June 1930
Mayor of the Shanghai Municipal Government
(3)	Zhang Qun (1889–1990)	1 July 1930	6 January 1932
4	Wu Tiecheng (1893–1953)	7 January 1932	31 March 1937
5	Yu Hung-chun (1898–1960)	1 April 1937	13 August 1945

==== Japanese occupation ====
No.	Officeholder	Term	
No.	Officeholder	Took office	Left office
Mayor of the Great Way Municipal Government of Shanghai
1	Su Xiwen (1889–1945)	5 December 1937	27 April 1938
Supervisor of the Shanghai Municipal Great Way Office
(1)	Su Xiwen (1889–1945)	28 April 1938	15 October 1938
Mayor of the Shanghai Special Municipal Government
2	Fu Xiaoan (1872–1940)	16 October 1938	11 October 1940
–	Su Xiwen (1889–1945)	11 October 1940	19 November 1940
3	Chen Gongbo (1892–1946)	20 November 1940	11 November 1944
–	Wu Songgao (1898–1953)	12 November 1944	14 January 1945
4	Zhou Fohai (1897–1948)	15 January 1944	12 September 1945

==== After World War II ====
No.	Officeholder	Term	Party
Mayor of the Shanghai Municipal Government
1	Qian Dajun (1893–1982)	12 September 1945 – 19 May 1946	Kuomintang
2	K. C. Wu (1903–1984)	20 May 1946 – 30 April 1949	Kuomintang
3	Chen Liang (1896–1994)	1 May 1949 – 24 May 1949	Kuomintang
–	Zhao Zukang (1900–1995)	24 May 1949 – 28 May 1949	Kuomintang

=== People's Republic of China ===
Since communist victory in the Shanghai Campaign, Shanghai has been led by its Mayor and Party Secretary, all officeholders of which are members of the Chinese Communist Party.

No.	Officeholder	Term	Ref.
Mayor of the Shanghai Municipal People's Government
1	Chen Yi (1901–1972)	28 May 1949 – February 1955	
Mayor of the Shanghai Municipal People's Committee
(1)	Chen Yi (1901–1972)	February 1955 – November 1958	
2	Ke Qingshi (1902–1965)	November 1958 – April 1965	
3	Cao Diqiu (1909–1976)	November 1965 – February 1967	
Director of the Shanghai People's Commune Interim Committee
4	Zhang Chunqiao (1917–2005)	February 1967 – February 1967	
Director of the Shanghai Municipal Revolutionary Committee
(4)	Zhang Chunqiao (1917–2005)	February 1967 – October 1976	
5	Su Zhenhua (1912–1979)	October 1976 – January 1979	
6	Peng Chong (1915–2010)	January 1979 – December 1979	
Mayor of the Shanghai Municipal People's Government
(6)	Peng Chong (1915–2010)	December 1979 – March 1980	
7	Wang Daohan (1915–2005)	April 1981 – July 1985	
8	Jiang Zemin (1926–2022)	July 1985 – April 1988	
9	Zhu Rongji (1928–2026)	April 1988 – April 1991	
10	Huang Ju (1938–2007)	April 1991 – February 1995	
11	Xu Kuangdi (born 1936)	February 1995 – December 2001	
12	Chen Liangyu (born 1944)	December 2001 – February 2003	
13	Han Zheng (born 1955)	February 2003 – 26 December 2012	
14	Yang Xiong (1953–2021)	26 December 2012 – 17 January 2017	
15	Ying Yong (born 1957)	20 January 2017 – 13 February 2020	
16	Gong Zheng (born 1960)	23 March 2020 – 4 September 2026	
17	Zhu Zhongming (born 1972)	4 September 2026 – Incumbent	
