= Falü chubanshe =

Chinese publisher

The Law Press (Chinese: Falü chubanshe 法律出版社) or Law Press·China is a publishing house located in Beijing, specializing primarily in legal books. It was established in 1954. It supervised and administered by the Ministry of Justice of the People's Republic of China. The publisher's logo is a left-facing Xiezhi, a mythical creature known as a symbol of justice.

Publications are f.e. the Xiyuan jilu 洗冤集录 by Song Ci 宋慈 or the Xin Han-Ying faxue cidian 新汉英法学词典 (A New Chinese-English Law Dictionary, 1998).

== See also ==
- China Legal Publishing House (中国法制出版社)
