= Chen Haosu =

Chinese poet and politician

- 陈昊苏
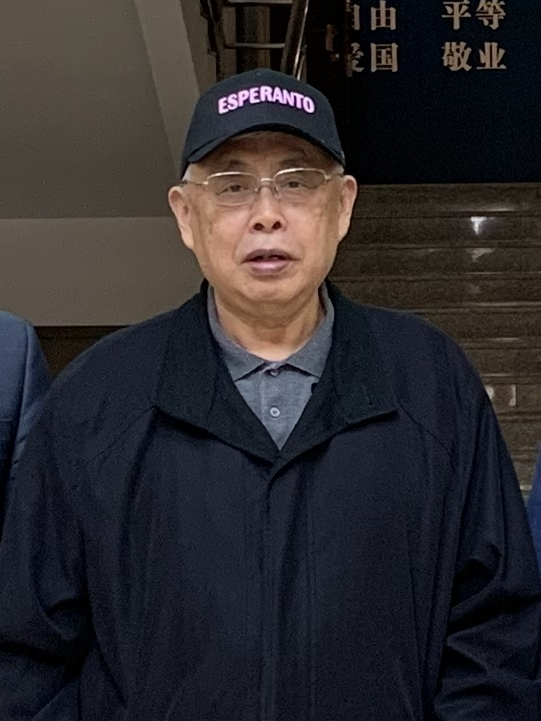

Chairperson of the Chinese People's Association for Friendship with Foreign Countries
- In office 2000–2011
- Preceded by: Qi Huaiyuan
- Succeeded by: Li Xiaolin

Personal details
- Born: May 1942 (age 83) Funing County, Jiangsu
- Party: Chinese Communist Party since 1965
- Spouse: Qin Zhao (秦昭)
- Parent(s): Chen Yi, Zhang Qian (张茜)
- Relatives: Chen Xiaolu (brother)
- Education: University of Science and Technology of China (BS)
- Occupation: Politician, poet

Chen Haosu (born 1942, Chinese: 陈昊苏) is a Chinese poet and politician. He served as Chairman of the Chinese People's Association for Friendship with Foreign Countries from 2000 to 2011. He is also President of the China International Friendship Cities Association, China-Russia Friendship Association and China-EU Association.

== Biography ==
Born in May 1942, Chen is son of the late Marshal and Foreign Minister Chen Yi. Following his graduation from elementary school in 1953, Chen Hao Su went to Shanghai and enrolled in Nanyang Model Middle School. In 1954, upon his father Chen Yi's appointment as Vice Premier of the State Council, the family relocated to Beijing, where he enrolled in Huiwen Middle School and Beijing No.4 High School. In 1959, following his high school graduation, he dedicated one year to the Preparatory Department of the Beijing Foreign Languages College to prepare for his studies in the Soviet Union. Nevertheless, owing to the animosity between China and the Soviet Union, he was unable to pursue that path and subsequently enrolled in the University of Science and Technology of China (USTC), specializing in Radiophysics.

Beginning in 1965, Chen was employed at the Second Research Institute of the 7th Ministry of Machinery and the Academy of Military Science of the People's Liberation Army (PLA). In 1981, he ascended to the position of secretary of the Secretariat of the Central Committee of the Communist Youth League. By 1983, he had become the deputy secretary of the Fengtai District Committee of Beijing Municipality, subsequently serving as vice mayor the following year, before his appointment as vice minister of the Film and Television Bureau in 1987, and member of the 9th Chinese People's Political Consultative Conference National Committee. Since 1990, he has served as Vice President of the Chinese People's Association for Friendship with Foreign Countries (CPAFFC) and was promoted to President in 2000.

Apart from his political involvement, Chen used to be researcher at the People's Liberation Army Academy of Military Sciences. He now serves in the Global Executive Committee and as Asia-Pacific President of the United Cities and Local Governments.

He is also a published poet.

== Works ==
- Chen Haosu poetry. New Star Press. 2006. ISBN 9787801489647.
- Flight of the poem. Foreign Languages Press. 2008. ISBN 9787119053806.

== Honors ==
- Order of Friendship of Russia, 1992.
- Order of Merit of Ukraine, 3rd Class, 2010.
- Order of the Rising Sun, 2nd Class, Gold and Silver Star, 2012.
