= Zhao Xinchu =

Chinese politician

Zhao Xinchu (Chinese: 赵辛初) (1915–1991), birth name Shuai Qitai (Chinese: 帅启汰) or Shuai Yinghai (Chinese: 帅英孩), courtesy name Qitai (Chinese: 启泰), was a Chinese politician, born in Huangmei County, Hubei Province. He was the Chinese Communist Party Committee Secretary and Governor of Hubei.

Preceded by Zeng Siyu	Governor of Hubei; 1978	Succeeded by Chen Pixian
