= Chen Xiaolu =

Chinese military officer and businessman

- 陈小鲁
- Born: 30 July 1946; Linyi, Shandong, China
- Died: 28 February 2018 (aged 71); Sanya, Hainan, China
- Education: Beijing No. 8 High School
- Occupations: Military officer, entrepreneur
- Organization: Anbang
- Political party: Chinese Communist Party
- Spouse: Su Huining (m. 1975; died 2018)
- Parent: Chen Yi
- Relatives: Chen Haosu (brother)

Chen Xiaolu (simplified Chinese: 陈小鲁; traditional Chinese: 陳小魯; pinyin: Chén Xiǎolǔ; 30 July 1946 – 28 February 2018) was a Chinese military officer and businessman. As a son of Marshal Chen Yi, he was one of China's most prominent princelings, or children of high officials. He held the rank of colonel when he quit his military and government posts in 1992 and entered business. His military background and princeling status helped his businesses expand to great sizes. He was an early director of privately held Anbang, which grew into an insurance giant. In 2013, he made national headlines when he publicly confessed and apologized for torturing and persecuting his teachers during the Cultural Revolution. He has been called the "conscience" of princelings.

== Early life ==
Chen was born on 30 July 1946 in the Yi-Meng Mountains in Linyi, Shandong, where his father Chen Yi was the commander of the Shandong Field Army during the Chinese Civil War. He was the youngest of Chen Yi's three sons and his name Xiaolu was from the Confucian classic text Mencius.

After the Communist victory in the Chinese Civil War and the establishment of the People's Republic of China, Chen Yi served as Mayor of Shanghai and Commander of the East China Military Region, and Xiaolu spent his early school years in Nanjing and Shanghai. When he was eight, his father was appointed Vice Premier and his family moved to Beijing, where he studied at Beijing No. 4 High School and Beijing No. 8 High School.

== Cultural Revolution ==
When the Cultural Revolution began in 1966, Chen joined the Red Guards and tortured and persecuted his teachers. He later confessed that he participated in organizing public struggle sessions against the teachers which often turned violent. He told Jane Perlez of The New York Times that the school's party chief, Hua Jia, committed suicide after being imprisoned in a storeroom and beaten for two weeks. She had been a party member for 30 years.

When more radical groups began to attack Communist Party leaders, Chen organized the "Beijing Xicheng District Red Guard Picket Corps" to defend the leaders such as his father. When Chen Yi, then serving as Foreign Minister of China, criticized the chaos of the Cultural Revolution, Mao Zedong sidelined him and the Red Guards occupied the Foreign Ministry. Premier Zhou Enlai sent Chen Xiaolu to the army for his safety.

=== Public apologies ===
In 2013, before the 50th anniversary of the Cultural Revolution, Chen issued a public apology to the teachers he and his classmates tortured. As president of the alumni association of Beijing No. 8 High School, he posted the following message on the alumni website:

As a student leader at Number Eight Middle School and the director of the school's Revolutionary Committee, I bear direct responsibility for the denouncing and criticism of school leaders, some teachers and students. In the early stages of the movement, I actively rebelled and organized the denouncements of school leaders. Later on when I served as the director of the school's Revolutionary Committee, I wasn't brave enough to stop the inhumane persecutions, because I feared I would be accused of protecting the old ways and being counter-revolutionary.

He explained that he was worried about the recent trend in China to reverse the repudiation of the Cultural Revolution, and concluded: "My official apology comes too late, but for the purification of the soul, the progress of society, the future of the nation, one must make this kind of apology." In October 2013, he apologized to his old teachers again in person when he visited the No. 8 School for an alumni reunion.

Chen's public apology made headlines nationwide and caused much online debate over the Cultural Revolution. Many praised him, but others criticized him for "picking over old wounds". Historian Xu Youyu considers his apology "very unusual", as former Red Guards generally describe themselves as victims of the Cultural Revolution and de-emphasize their own wrongdoings. Chen has been called the "conscience" of princelings.

== Career ==
After the Cultural Revolution, Chen worked for a few years as an assistant defence attaché in the Chinese embassy in London, before returning to China in 1985. He subsequently worked for the liberal Central Office for Political Structure Reform under Bao Tong, assistant to the reformist leader Zhao Ziyang, and called for the establishment of independent workers' unions. The proposed political reforms were aborted after the Tiananmen Square protests of 1989 and the subsequent crackdown. Chen, then with the rank of colonel, left the government and the military in 1992.

Chen started his own business after leaving the government, and his princeling status and military background helped his businesses expand to "staggering" sizes. He was an early director of Anbang, founded by Wu Xiaohui, which became a successful car dealership and insurance company and bought the Waldorf Astoria New York Hotel in 2014. However, Chen said he was merely an advisor and not a shareholder.

== Personal life ==
In 1975, Chen married Su Huining (粟惠宁), the daughter of Grand General Su Yu, Marshal Chen Yi's second in command.

== Death ==
On 28 February 2018, Chen died in Hainan following a heart attack, at the age of 71.
