= Party Secretary of Shanghai =

Municipal government position in China

Secretary of the Shanghai Municipal Committee of the Chinese Communist Party
- 中国共产党上海市委员会书记
- Emblem of the Chinese Communist Party

- Flag of the Chinese Communist Party

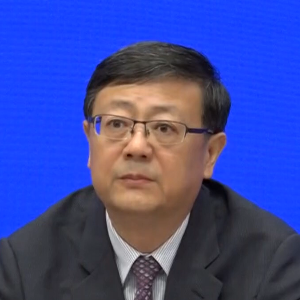
- Incumbent; Chen Jining since October 28, 2022
- Shanghai Municipal Committee of the Chinese Communist Party
- Type: Party Committee Secretary
- Status: Provincial and ministerial-level official
- Member of: Shanghai Municipal Standing Committee
- Seat: Huangpu, Shanghai
- Nominator: Central Committee
- Appointer: Shanghai Municipal Committee; Central Committee
- Inaugural holder: Rao Shushi
- Formation: 1949
- Deputy: Deputy Secretary; Secretary-General

The secretary of the Shanghai Municipal Committee of the Chinese Communist Party is the leader of the Shanghai Municipal Committee of the Chinese Communist Party (CCP). As the CCP is the sole ruling party of the People's Republic of China (PRC), the secretary is the highest ranking post in Shanghai.

The secretary is officially appointed by the CCP Central Committee based on the recommendation of the CCP Organization Department, which is then approved by the Politburo and its Standing Committee. The secretary can also be appointed by a plenary meeting of the Shanghai Municipal Committee, but the candidate must be the same as the one approved by the central government. The secretary leads the Standing Committee of the Shanghai Municipal Committee, and since at least 2007, the secretary has consistently been a member of the CCP Politburo. The secretary leads the work of the Municipal Committee and its Standing Committee. The secretary outranks the mayor, who is generally the deputy secretary of the committee.

The current secretary is Chen Jining, a member of the CCP Politburo, who took office on 28 October 2022.

== List of party secretaries ==
No.	Portrait	Name	Took office	Left office	Ref.
1		Rao Shushi	1949	1950	
2		Chen Yi	1950	1954	
3		Ke Qingshi	1954	1965	
4		Chen Pixian	1965	1967	
5		Zhang Chunqiao	1971	1976	
6		Su Zhenhua	1976	1979	
7		Peng Chong	1979	1980	
8		Chen Guodong	1980	1985	
9		Rui Xingwen	1985	1987	
10		Jiang Zemin	27 November 1987	1 August 1989	
11		Zhu Rongji	1 August 1989	20 March 1991	
12		Wu Bangguo	20 March 1991	28 September 1994	
13		Huang Ju	28 September 1994	15 November 2002	
14		Chen Liangyu	15 November 2002	24 September 2006	
—		Han Zheng	24 September 2006	24 March 2007	
15		Xi Jinping	24 March 2007	27 October 2007	
16		Yu Zhengsheng	27 October 2007	20 November 2012	
17		Han Zheng	20 November 2012	29 October 2017	
18		Li Qiang	29 October 2017	28 October 2022	
19		Chen Jining	28 October 2022	Incumbent	
