= Chen Guodong =

Chinese politician (1911–2005)

Chen Guodong (simplified Chinese: 陈国栋; traditional Chinese: 陳國棟; pinyin: Chén Guódòng; 15 September 1911 – 7 June 2005) was a member of the 12th and 13th Central Advisory Commission from Nanchang, Jiangxi. He was also known to be the former Shanghai CCP Shanghai Municipal Committee Secretary.

Chen joined the revolutionary movement in 1931 and gained membership in the Chinese Communist Party in March 1932. He was a long serving member of the Young Communist League, appointed as the special secretary for the Shanghai region. He also held appointments such as being the in Hudong District Organization Department, party secretary of Jiangsu Provincial Party Committee Organization Department of the Communist Youth League. During the Second Sino-Japanese War, he served in the Jiangsu region as the chairman of inland revenue and the director general of the district's salt bureau amongst other positions he held. During the Chinese Civil War, he was one of Jiangsu's deputy trade secretaries and was the Deputy Director of the Administrative Office of Sunan region.

After the establishment of China in 1950, he held positions in the Ministry of Finance and Chairman of the Transport Bank. He was persecuted during the Cultural Revolution. From December 1979 to June 1985, he was the CCP Shanghai Municipal Committee Secretary. He became the Director of the Shanghai Municipal Advisory Commission from 1985 till his retirement in 1992.

Party political offices
Preceded by Peng Chong	CCP Shanghai Municipal Committee Secretary; 1979–1985	Succeeded by Rui Xingwen
