= China Legal Publishing House =

Chinese publishing company

China Legal Publishing House (Chinese: 中国法制出版社) is a publishing company in China.

== History ==
The company is a state owned enterprise under the Legal Affairs Office of the State Council of China and was established on June 10, 1989. Its publications focus on official statutes and books related to the law.
