= Peng Chong =

Chinese politician (1915–2010)

Peng Chong

Peng Chong (Chinese: 彭冲; March 1915 – October 18, 2010), born Xu Tieru (許鐵如), was a member of the Chinese Communist Party (CCP) Central Committee (1969–87) and its politburo (1977–82); and Secretary General of the National People's Congress between 1988 and 1992.

== Pre-1949 ==
Peng Chong, originally named Xu Tieru (許鐵如), was born in Zhangzhou, Fujian in 1915. Unlike most CCP leaders of his generation, he graduated from middle school, and by the age of 15 was active in underground communist activities in his home county. As the leader of the local student movement, he joined the Communist Youth League in 1933, and the Party a year later, eventually rising to the post of local Organization Department Director. In 1938, Peng was a regimental political officer in the central Jiangsu New Fourth Army, a district administrator (1938–39) in Wuxian, and back to being a regimental cadre in 1940–42 in the 52nd Regiment of the 18th Brigade, 6th Division, under Tan Zhenlin and Rao Shoukun. At the close of the war, Peng was county CCP Secretary in Taizhou (1945).

During the post-war reorganization, the New Fourth Army was merged into the East China Field Army and, later, the Third Field Army. In 1947–49, Peng served as deputy political commissar for the 6th Division, under Rao Shushi.

== Post-1949 ==
Peng Chong emerged from the civil war as provincial government deputy secretary general, and Director of the Fujian Province CCP United Front Work Department, and deputy head of the East China's Bureau UFWD. The latter work put him in close contact with overseas Chinese groups, Hong Kong and Taiwanese communities outside Taiwan. Peng's work in Fujian put him in close contact with future leaders such as Ye Fei, Fang Yi and Xu Jiatun.

After working in Fujian reconstruction for several years, Peng served briefly in the party's East China Bureau in 1954, and then was named Mayor and CCP Deputy Secretary of Nanjing, in the summer of 1955. In 1956, he took over as 1st Secretary from Xu Jiatun. He appears to have warmly embraced the "Hundred Flowers" liberalization movement, and equally enthusiastically crushed it when the time came. His response to the Great Leap Forward was similar: in March 1958, Mao Zedong singled out Nanjing and Tianjin as laggards, after which Peng modestly increased his official enthusiasm. In January 1959, he was elevated to the provincial CCP Standing Committee, and some months later gave up his position as mayor of Nanjing.

In 1960, Peng moved into provincial-level work full-time and relinquished his position as head of the Nanjing party apparatus, a promotion that enabled him to visit the USSR in 1962. However, sometime between December 1962 and January 1964 (reports differ), Peng once again was identified as Nanjing's 1st Secretary, yet retained his provincial culture and media posts. At the end of 1965, he was elevated to the post of Secretary of the provincial CCP Secretariat, a role in charge of day-to-day party affairs.

== Cultural Revolution ==
The Jiangsu provincial leadership was broadly targeted for "struggle" in the Cultural Revolution, and responded with the typical effort to control the Red Guard, battle radicals with outside workers, and inevitably, violence. While the more forceful responses would have been the responsibility of more senior people such as Nanjing Military Region Commander Xu Shiyou, Peng's involvement in the first phases is clear.

Peng was denounced by the Red Guard in 1967 for his official visit to the USSR and his post-trip comment that China might learn something from Soviet art. Nevertheless, he was named the sole civilian provincial Revolutionary Committee Vice Chair in March 1968. Aligning his star with the armed forces led to being elected an alternate of the 9th Central Committee of the Chinese Communist Party. When order, and the provincial party committee were restored in 1970, Peng was made a Deputy Secretary, again as the sole civilian.

Xu Shiyou's 1974 transfer to Guangzhou opened up space for Peng Chong to become 1st CCP Secretary and Chairman of the Jiangsu Revolutionary Committee. This brief role positioned him to play a more pivotal role in neutralizing the Gang of Four's supporters in Shanghai following the October 1976 coup d'état. Peng, General Su Zhenhua and labor politico Ni Zhifu were sent to Shanghai to take power from the radical left, while long-time ally Xu Jiatun remained behind as Jiangsu secretary.

== National affairs ==
Although Peng was nominally 3rd CCP Secretary of Shanghai, his two nominal superiors' national-level responsibilities left him as de facto boss. As a reward for his loyalty and efficiency in purging Shanghai, he was elevated to the politburo in August 1977. Peng added a National People's Congress (NPC) Vice Chairmanship to his titles (1978–87), and was formally named Shanghai 1st Secretary in early 1979, due to Su Zhenhua's death, and mayor at the end of the year. He remained affiliated with Shanghai until 1981, when he was succeeded in the party and state roles by Chen Guodong and Wang Daohan, respectively. Among his top priorities was establishing a merit-based education system.

In 1980, Peng was promoted to work directly for Hu Yaobang in the CCP Central Committee Secretariat, his first move out of provincial politics. However, in September 1982, at the 12th National Party Congress, Peng Chong lost his politburo seat and that on the Secretariat. His last posts were as Vice Chairman and Secretary-General (1988–93) of the National People's Congress.

Party political offices
Preceded by Su Zhenhua	Party Secretary of Shanghai; 1979–1980	Succeeded by Chen Guodong
Government offices
Preceded by Su Zhenhua	Mayor of Shanghai; 1979–1981	Succeeded by Wang Daohan
