= Shanghai Municipal Supervisory Commission =

Governance body in Shanghai, China

The Shanghai Municipal Supervisory Commission (Chinese: 上海市监察委员会, 上海市监察委) is a provincial-level local state supervisory authority in Shanghai. The Commission is co-located with the Disciplinary Inspection Committee of the Shanghai Municipal Committee of the Chinese Communist Party. It was established in January 2018 to assume the functions of the former Shanghai Municipal Supervisory Bureau.

The director of the Shanghai Municipal Supervision Commission is elected by the Shanghai Municipal People's Congress and is accountable to the Congress, its Standing Committee, and the Supervision Commission of the People's Republic of China.

== History ==
On 29 January 2018, the Shanghai Municipal Supervisory Commission was officially constituted. This signified the implementation of Shanghai's governance structure in alignment with central government and the completion of the Supervisory Commission at both urban and municipal levels, co-located with the CCP's Shanghai Municipal Commission for Discipline Inspection.
