= Chen Pixian =

Chinese politician (1916–1995)

- 陈丕显
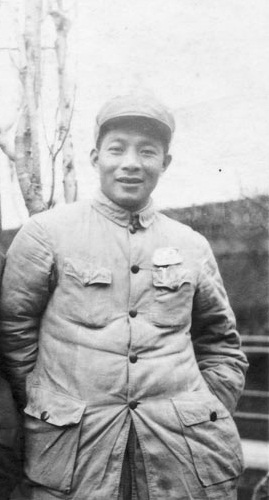
- Chen in 1949

Secretary of the Central Political and Legal Affairs Commission
- In office May 1982 – July 1985
- Preceded by: Peng Zhen
- Succeeded by: Qiao Shi

Party Secretary of Shanghai
- In office 1965 – December 1966
- Preceded by: Ke Qingshi
- Succeeded by: Post Temporarily Abolished in January Storm

Personal details
- Born: March 20, 1916 Shanghang County, Fujian, China
- Died: August 23, 1995 (aged 79) Beijing
- Party: Chinese Communist Party

Chen Pixian (simplified Chinese: 陈丕显; traditional Chinese: 陳丕顯; pinyin: Chén Pīxiǎn; March 20, 1916 – August 23, 1995) was a Chinese Communist revolutionary and politician. He served in several prominent roles, including party chief of Shanghai and party chief of Hubei province. He was purged at the beginning of the Cultural Revolution but was later rehabilitated.

== Biography ==
Chen Pixian was born in Shanghang County, Fujian in 1916. He joined the Chinese Communist Party (CCP) in 1931.

After the People's Republic of China was founded, Chen carried out the work of land reform, bandit suppression and post-war recovery in Jiangsu. After three years of hard work, the annual output of grain and cotton in southern Jiangsu exceeded the highest annual output before the Anti-Japanese War, and the output of most industrial products doubled. His outstanding performance in completing land reform and suppressing bandits once earned him the praise of Mao Zedong.

Chen was transferred to Shanghai to work as the Fourth Secretary of the Shanghai Municipal Committee of the Chinese Communist Party and a member of the East China Administrative Committee in 1952. From 1953 to 1954, he served concurrently as a member of the East China Bureau of the Central Committee of the Chinese Communist Party, and from 1954 to 1960, he served concurrently as a member of the Shanghai Bureau of the CCP Central Committee. In 1954, he became the second secretary of the Shanghai Municipal Committee. From February 1961 to the winter of 1966, he served concurrently as the Secretary of the Secretariat of the East China Bureau. From 1958, he served concurrently as the Chairman of the Shanghai CPPCC. From November 1965 to January 1967, he served as the First Secretary of the Shanghai Municipal Committee and the First Political Commissar of the Shanghai PLA Garrison, making him the leader of Shanghai's party organisation in that period.

From April to December 31, 1966, he was recuperating from nasal cancer. Cao Diqiu served as the acting First Secretary in his absence.

In 1967, Chen was ousted from power during the January Storm by radical elements led by Zhang Chunqiao. Chen spent much of the Cultural Revolution in solitary confinement.

On September 9, 1974, Chen wrote a letter to Mao in hopes of assigned a job, or to be released from isolation and participate in collective study, to no avail, due to Zhang and others' efforts to obstruct Chen's return to politics.

On February 20, 1975, Chen wrote to the recently rehabilitated Deng Xiaoping saying, "I have not yet returned to my organisational life and salary. I ask that the Central Committee approve my visit to Beijing for a medical examination and request a meeting with the Central leadership." Deng Xiaoping took the opportunity of accompanying Mao to meet with foreign guests to ask Mao whether Chen's organisational life and salary could be resumed first. Mao Zedong replied: "Of course." Thus on September 13 of the same year, the Shanghai Municipal Committee and the Shanghai Revolutionary Committee internally decided that Chen would be the Vice Chairman of the Shanghai Revolutionary Committee. The decision to make him Vice Chairman was reported to and approved by the Central Committee on September 16. Though in practice, the Shanghai Government did not assign Chen any tasks, and in fact excluded him from any decision-making.

In late September of the same year, Chen again wrote to Deng, requesting to leave Shanghai as soon as possible. Deng promptly wrote to Mao, requesting that he be considered for a transfer to Beijing and then be assigned a job in one of China's provinces due to his relative youth and abilities, simultaneously citing Chen's many requests for receiving medical treatment in Beijing. Mao soon after approved Deng's requests. On October 12 of the same year, Chen was flown to Beijing and stayed at the guesthouse of the Organization Department of the Chinese Communist Party.

Following the downfall of the Gang of Four, Chen became the Secretary of the Yunnan Provincial Committee and the Vice Chairman of the Yunnan Provincial Revolutionary Committee in February 1977.

In July 1977, Chen's work was transferred to Hubei province. From 1978, he served concurrently as Party Secretary of Hubei and its Governor (1980 onwards). During this time, he was also Political Commissar of the Wuhan Military Region and the First Political Commissar of the Hubei Military Region.

He became a Secretary of the Secretariat of the Chinese Communist Party in 1982, and was the Secretary of the Central Political and Legal Affairs Commission from 1982 to 1985. Chen Pixian died in Beijing on August 23, 1995, aged 79.

Political offices
Preceded by Ke Qingshi	Chairman of Shanghai CPPCC; 1958–1967	Succeeded by Peng Chong
Preceded by Ke Qingshi	Party Secretary of Shanghai; 1965–1967	Succeeded by Zhang Chunqiao
Preceded by Zhao Xinchu	Governor of Hubei; 1978–1980	Succeeded by Han Ningfu
Preceded by Zhao Xinchu	Party Secretary of Hubei; 1978–1982	Succeeded by Guan Guangfu
Preceded by Peng Zhen	Secretary of the Central Political and Legal Affairs Commission; 1982–1985	Succeeded by Qiao Shi
