= Zhuang Xiaotian =

Chinese politician and banker (1933–2023)

Zhuang Xiaotian (Traditional Chinese: 莊曉天, Simplified Chinese: 庄晓天; 1933 – 26 March 2023) was a Chinese politician and senior banker. He was the first President of the Shanghai Pudong Development Bank.

== Biography ==
Zhuang was born in 1933 in Zhenhai County (current Beilun District), Ningbo, Zhejiang Province. In 1945, he graduated from Weidou Elementary School. He went to Shanghai with his brother. He is a graduate of Shanghai University of Finance and Economics.

Zhuang was the vice mayor of Shanghai. He was mainly in charge of Shanghai's commerce, trade and industry. He was later president of the Foundation for Shanghai Elderly, the president of the Shanghai Urban Development Foundation, the chief supervisor for the Shanghai Charity Foundation, the president of Shanghai-Ningbo Economic Association (上海宁波经贸促进会), and the president of the Shanghai-Ningbo Chamber of Commerce (上海宁波商会).

Zhuang died in Shanghai on 26 March 2023.
