= Chen Yi (marshal) =

Chinese general, People's Republic of China (1901–1972)

Yuanshuai Chen Yi
- 陈毅
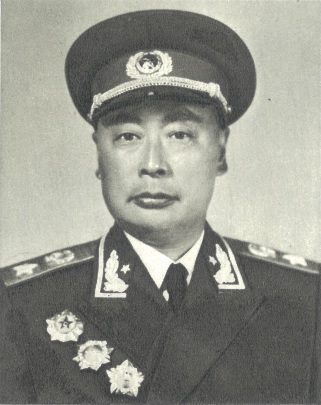

Vice Premier of China
- In office September 1954 – January 1972
- Premier: Zhou Enlai

Minister of Foreign Affairs
- In office 11 February 1958 – 6 January 1972
- Premier: Zhou Enlai
- Deputy: Luo Guibo
- Preceded by: Zhou Enlai
- Succeeded by: Ji Pengfei

Party Secretary of Shanghai
- In office 1950–1954
- Preceded by: Rao Shushi
- Succeeded by: Ke Qingshi

8th Mayor of Shanghai
- In office May 1949 – November 1958
- Preceded by: Zhao Zukang
- Succeeded by: Ke Qingshi

1st President of the China Foreign Affairs University
- In office 1955–1969
- Preceded by: none
- Succeeded by: Liu Chun; Closed until 1980

Personal details
- Born: Chen Shijun (陈世俊); 26 August 1901 Lezhi County, Sichuan, Qing China
- Died: 6 January 1972 (aged 70) Beijing, China
- Spouses: Xiao Juying (萧菊英) (m. 1930; died 1932) Lai Yueming (赖月明) (m. 1932) (later separated due to war, each believing the other deceased. She later remarried.) Zhang Qian (张茜) (m. 1940)
- Relations: Wang Guangya
- Children: Chen Haosu, Chen Xiaolu
- Nickname(s): 元帅诗人 (yuán shuài shī rén, "The poet marshal") 陈老总 (Chén lǎozǒng, "Old Chief Chen"); 501 (military call sign)

Military service
- Allegiance: China
- Branch/service: People's Liberation Army Ground Force
- Years of service: 1927–1972
- Rank: Marshal of People's Republic of China
- Commands: Commander, PLA Eastern China Field Army; Deputy Commander, PLA Central China Field Army
- Battles/wars: Northern Expedition; Sino-Japanese War; Hundred Regiments Offensive; Chinese Civil War; Nanchang Uprising; Long March; Menglianggu campaign; Shanghai Campaign

Chen Yi (Chinese: 陈毅; pinyin: Chén Yì; Wade–Giles: Ch'en I; August 26, 1901 – January 6, 1972) was a Chinese Communist military commander and politician. He served as Mayor of Shanghai from 1949 to 1958 and as Foreign Minister of China from 1958 to 1972. He is one of Ten Marshals of the People's Republic of China.

== Early life ==
Chen Yi was born on 26 August 1901 in Lezhi County, Sichuan, into a family of small landowners of Hakka ethnicity. Chen's family originally came from Xinning County, Hunan, and had moved to Sichuan during the migrations of the early Qing dynasty. By the time of his birth, its landholdings had shrunk from 800 mu to 40. His father, Chen Changli, was a village schoolteacher. He attended a private school from the age of five and a primary school from the age of nine, and in 1916, he entered the Class A Industrial School in Chengdu. In the spring of 1919, he went to France on the work–study programme. In Paris, he met Zhou Enlai, Cai Hesen and Li Fuchun, and he began to study Marxism.

In 1921, the Beiyang government's envoy, Zhu Qiqian, negotiated a large French loan secured on Chinese railway, mining and tax revenues. Chen joined the students' protests against the loan, during which students assaulted a secretary of the Chinese legation. After a failed attempt by students to occupy the Sino-French Institute in Lyon, he was deported to China in October 1921. In the autumn of 1922, on Cai Hesen's recommendation, he joined the Socialist Youth League.

In the spring of 1923, Chen became editor of the literary supplement of the Xin Shu Bao in Chongqing. In October, he enrolled at the Sino-French University in Beijing, and in November, he joined the Chinese Communist Party (CCP). In 1924, he joined the Literary Research Association and was elected president of the university's student union. In 1926, he helped to organize protests in Beijing and survived the March 18 Massacre. In August, Li Dazhao sent him to Sichuan to carry out party work in the army, and there he met Zhu De. In December, he joined Yang Angong, Zhu De, Liu Bocheng and others in launching the Luzhou–Shunqing uprising. In the spring of 1927, he joined the political department of the Central Military and Political Academy in Wuhan.

== Chinese Civil War (1927–1937) ==
After the Nanchang uprising of 1 August 1927, Chen joined the insurgent army at Fuzhou and became political instructor of its 73rd Regiment. He was left at Sanheba under Zhu De, and after the main force was defeated in the Chaoshan region, he helped Zhu to reorganize the surviving troops and lead them through the border region of Fujian, Guangdong, Jiangxi and Hunan.

In January 1928, Chen helped to lead the South Hunan Uprising as party representative of the 1st Division of the Workers' and Peasants' Revolutionary Army. In April, his forces joined those of Mao Zedong at Longshi, Ninggang, to form the Fourth Army of the Workers' and Peasants' Revolutionary Army (later the Red Fourth Army), in which he commanded the 12th Division, and he helped to establish the base area in the Jinggang Mountains. In January 1929, he moved with the army into southern Jiangxi and western Fujian, serving as party representative of its 1st Column. In June, as director of its political department and acting secretary of its Front Committee, he presided over the army's 7th Party Congress, at which he criticized Mao and was elected secretary of the Front Committee.

In August 1929, Chen went to Shanghai to report to the party leadership on the army's history, strategy and organization. He was then appointed to a three-man committee convened by Zhou Enlai, and he drafted the Central Committee's "September Letter" to the army, which he brought back, together with a request that Mao resume leadership of the Front Committee. In December 1929, he helped Mao to convene the Gutian Conference. In February 1930, he became political commissar of the Red 6th Army, and in June, he became commander of the Red 22nd Army. After the Futian incident, he was sent to deal with its aftermath. During the purges of the alleged AB League in 1931, he released detainees against whom there was no evidence, and Li Shaojiu suspected him of being one of the league's leaders, but Mao protected him.

In January 1932, Chen became commander and political commissar of the Jiangxi Military Region, and he took part in the fourth and fifth counter-encirclement campaigns. He was badly wounded while commanding at Laoyingpan, Xingguo, on 28 August 1934, and when the Long March began in October, he was left behind in the Jiangxi Soviet because of his injury, as director of the central government's office there. In March 1935, he and Xiang Ying led the remaining Red Army troops and guerrillas out of the Nationalist encirclement and began a guerrilla war. Cut off from the central leadership, they held out around Youshan, on the Jiangxi–Guangdong border, for three years. In the winter of 1936, while surrounded by the Nationalist 46th Division at Meiling, Chen wrote the poem Three Stanzas of Meiling (梅岭三章).

== Second Sino-Japanese War ==
After the Second United Front was formed, Chen negotiated with the Nationalist authorities in Ganzhou and Nanchang in September 1937. While visiting other guerrilla areas to persuade the units there to come down from the hills and be reorganized, he was nearly executed in error by Tan Yubao, the leader of the Hunan–Jiangxi border guerrillas. When the New Fourth Army was formed, he became commander of its 1st Detachment. In May 1938, he led it behind Japanese lines into southern Jiangsu, where he established a base area around Mount Mao, and in November 1939, he became commander of the army's Jiangnan Headquarters.

In July 1940, Chen led his main force north of the Yangtze and became commander of the Subei Headquarters. In October, he and Su Yu defeated the forces of Han Deqin at the Battle of Huangqiao, destroying more than 10,000 of Han's troops, and the New Fourth Army then linked up with the Eighth Route Army at Yancheng. In November, Chen became deputy commander and acting commander of the joint headquarters of the two armies in central China. After the New Fourth Army incident of January 1941, he became acting commander of the rebuilt New Fourth Army, and with its political commissar, Liu Shaoqi, he reorganized its 90,000 troops into seven divisions and an independent brigade. After Liu returned to Yan'an in the spring of 1942, Chen led the army, which grew to 135,000 men. In October 1943, the army's acting political commissar, Rao Shushi, criticized him at a meeting, in what became known as the Huanghuatang incident, and in November, he went to Yan'an to attend the forthcoming party congress. In 1945, he was elected to the Central Committee at the 7th Party Congress.

== Chinese Civil War (1945–1949) ==
After the war, Chen became deputy secretary of the CCP's East China Bureau and commander of the New Fourth Army, the Shandong Military Region and the Shandong Field Army. In October 1945, he directed the Jinpu campaign, which, according to Chinese Communist accounts, destroyed 28,000 Nationalist troops and delayed the Nationalist advance north. In 1946, his forces won at Chaoyangji but were defeated at Sixian. After the Nationalists took Huaiyin and Huai'an in September 1946, his Shandong Field Army and Su Yu's Central China Field Army began to operate together. On 11 October 1946, Mao directed that major decisions be made jointly under Chen's leadership, with Su Yu in charge of campaign command, and Chen, Su and Tan Zhenlin went on to direct the Subei and Lunan campaigns.

In January 1947, the two armies were merged as the East China Field Army, with Chen as commander and political commissar, and he also commanded the East China Military Region. Chen was responsible for overall policy, while Su Yu directed most operations. In February 1947, the army destroyed Li Xianzhou's forces in the Laiwu campaign, and in May, it destroyed the Nationalist Reorganized 74th Division at Menglianggu, where its commander, Zhang Lingfu, was killed. In August 1947, Chen and Su led eight columns into the Henan–Anhui–Jiangsu border region after a victory at Shatuji. In May 1948, Chen also became second secretary of the Central Plains Bureau and first deputy commander of the Central Plains Military Region and the Central Plains Field Army, while keeping his posts in East China. In the Huaihai campaign of late 1948, he was a member of the standing committee of the General Front Committee.

In January 1949, Chen became commander and political commissar of the Third Field Army, as the East China Field Army was now known. In April, he, Deng Xiaoping and others directed the Yangtze River Crossing campaign, in which Communist forces took Nanjing, Hangzhou and Shanghai. Before the Shanghai Campaign, he issued rules of conduct for troops entering the city, including a ban on entering private homes. After Shanghai fell in late May 1949, he became mayor and head of its military control commission. The city faced shortages of coal and grain and rapid inflation. With Chen Yun, Chen moved to stabilize its economy: they suppressed speculation in silver dollars, closing the Shanghai securities exchange, and used state reserves of grain, cotton and coal from across East China to bring down prices.

== People's Republic of China ==
After the founding of the People's Republic in October 1949, Chen remained commander of the East China Military Region and the Third Field Army. As mayor of Shanghai, he oversaw campaigns against speculation, land reform, the Three-anti and Five-anti Campaigns and the socialist transformation of industry and commerce. In the factional struggle around the 4th Plenary Session of the 7th Central Committee in early 1954, he opposed Gao Gang and Rao Shushi and supported Mao. A CIA file dated 23 July 1951 named Chen Yi as a military advisor to North Vietnamese forces then being stationed in Inter-Region 4. (Note: Vietnam's "Inter-Region 4" was labeled as "Intersector IV" and "Bình-Trị-Thiên Front" in this document.)

In September 1954, Chen became a Vice Premier and a vice-chairman of the National Defence Council, with responsibility for science, political and legal affairs, and culture. In April 1955, he accompanied Zhou Enlai to the Bandung Conference. On 27 September 1955, he was made a Marshal of the People's Republic of China. In February 1956, he became chairman of the State Scientific Planning Commission, and in September, he was elected to the Politburo at the 8th Party Congress. In March 1962, in speeches in Guangzhou to national conferences of scientists and playwrights, he called for intellectuals to be treated with greater respect.

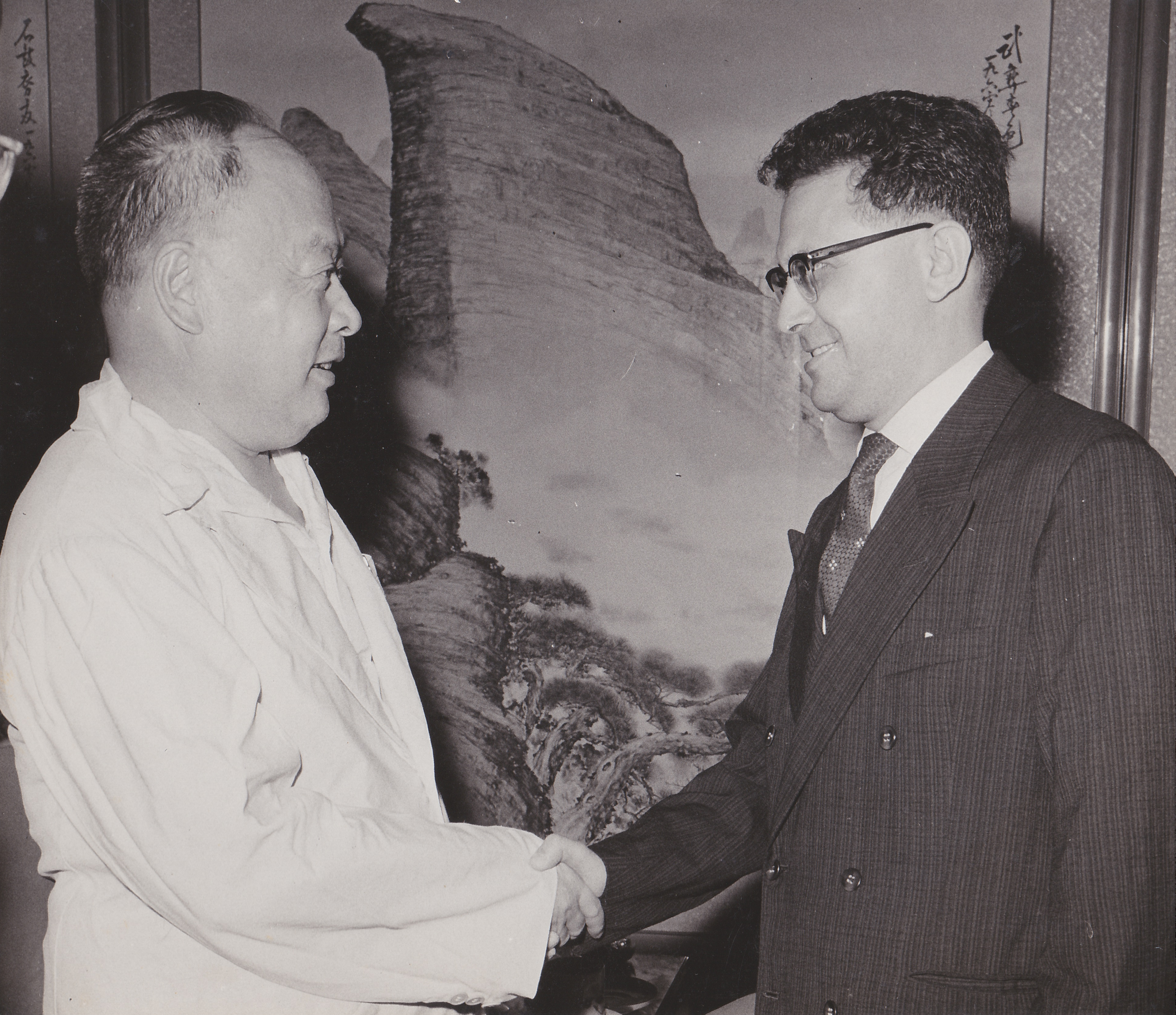
In 1961, Chen Yi, then Head of the Foreign Affairs Group, meets with Tunisia's Ambassador to USSR, Poland and Czechoslovakia Ahmed Mestiri in Beijing to discuss China's support at the UN Security Council in the conflict between France and Tunisia around the Bizerte Naval Base.

In February 1958, Chen succeeded Zhou Enlai as Foreign Minister, and in 1961, he also became president of the Foreign Affairs College (now China Foreign Affairs University). In June 1958, Mao changed the Party and government structure by establishing groups in charge of finance, legal matters, foreign affairs, science, and culture and education which bypassed the State Council. Chen was made the head of the Foreign Affairs Group. As foreign minister, he concluded boundary settlements with Burma, Nepal and Afghanistan, accompanied Zhou on several visits to Asian and African countries, established diplomatic relations with France and developed unofficial ties with Japan. In 1961, he attended the Geneva Conference on Laos. He remained involved in military affairs as a member of the standing committee of the Central Military Commission from September 1959. In 1961, during a debate on the nuclear weapons programme, he said that China must build an atomic bomb "even if we have to pawn our trousers". As Vice Premier, he was present during the breakup of Sino-Soviet relations. In August 1960, Chen Yi attempted to ease tensions with the Soviets, declaring on one instance to the Soviet Ambassador to Beijing that Moscow should stop "severing the friendship between the two nations," and two weeks later to the Soviet Deputy Foreign Minister that Moscow and Beijing should both try to save the alliance.

In 1962, Chen called for some market-style experiments in the cultural field. In comparison to most other top leadership in China, he was more supportive of artistic autonomy. Like other Chinese policymakers, Chen viewed the July 1963 Limited Nuclear Test Ban Treaty as demonstrating a US-USSR re-alignment against China. Chen described it as "targeted against us."

Addressing China's support for revolution in the context of principles of self-reliance, Chen stated in 1963 that "China will support revolutions both morally and politically. We are Marxists. We must support them... But it must be noted, Chinese troops will not cross our borders to advance revolution."

== Cultural Revolution and death ==
At the start of the Cultural Revolution in 1966, Chen sent eight work teams into the foreign affairs system, following a decision of the Politburo. After Mao condemned the work teams in July, Chen accepted responsibility for them. On 13 November 1966, he, Ye Jianying, He Long and Xu Xiangqian addressed more than 80,000 military academy students at the Workers' Stadium in Beijing and criticized ultra-left behaviour. At a meeting on 16 February 1967, he, Tan Zhenlin and Li Xiannian denounced the Central Cultural Revolution Group. After the group reported to Mao and Mao sided with it, they were condemned for the "February Countercurrent", for their criticisms of the Cultural Revolution for creating social disorder and undermining China's leadership. As a result, he was required to request a leave of absence and undertake self-criticism, but he was never dismissed, so Zhou Enlai performed the duties of Foreign Minister in his place. After a speech by the radical Wang Li on 7 August 1967, rebels seized control of the Foreign Ministry, and Chen was repeatedly denounced. Zhou Enlai reportedly told the rebels that they would have to step over him to seize Chen. Chen was criticized again at the 12th Plenary Session of the 8th Central Committee in October 1968 and at the 9th Party Congress in April 1969.

In February 1969, Chen was sent to work at a railway vehicle factory at Nankou, outside Beijing. From March, he met weekly with Ye Jianying, Xu Xiangqian and Nie Rongzhen to review the international situation, and he proposed resuming the ambassadorial talks between China and the United States. In October 1969, after Lin Biao's "Order No. 1" placed the army on emergency alert, he was sent away from Beijing to Shijiazhuang. At the 2nd Plenary Session of the 9th Central Committee in August 1970, he spoke in defence of the claim that Mao was a "genius", and he was accused of joining forces with Chen Boda. He returned to Beijing for medical treatment in October 1970, and in January 1971, he was diagnosed with colon cancer during surgery. After Marshal Lin Biao's death in 1971, he was restored to favour, although not to his former power. Chen did not enjoy his rehabilitation for long. He died in Beijing on 6 January 1972 at the age of 70. Mao Zedong attended Chen's funeral in 1972 at Babaoshan on 10 January, and Zhou Enlai delivered the eulogy. This was Mao's last public appearance and his first appearance at anyone's funeral during the Cultural Revolution. It was also the only time Mao Zedong attended a memorial service for a Party and state leader after the founding of the People's Republic.

== Personal life ==
Chen married three times. In 1930, in Xinfeng, Jiangxi, he married Xiao Juying, a 19-year-old student, who died in 1931 after falling into a well. In 1932, he married Lai Yueming, a Red Army soldier from Xingguo, but they lost contact after he sent her home to hide in 1934. In 1937, he became engaged to Hu Lanqi, but the party opposed the marriage, judging it more important that she continue her undercover work as a major general in the Nationalist army. In 1940, he married Zhang Qian (1922–1974). Their children are Chen Haosu (born 1942), a former vice-mayor of Beijing and president of the Chinese People's Association for Friendship with Foreign Countries; Chen Danhuai (born 1943), a major general; Chen Xiaolu (1946–2018), a businessman; and a daughter, Cong Jun (born Chen Shanshan in 1950), a former ambassador to Estonia, who is married to the diplomat Wang Guangya.

Chen was a keen Go player and promoted its revival in mainland China. The Nihon Ki-in gave him honorary seventh- and eighth-dan ranks, and in 2012, he became the first non-Japanese person elected to Japan's Go Hall of Fame. When not in military uniform, Chen Yi was known for his trademark sunglasses and white shirt. He was an avid weiqi player and was prominent in promoting the game to a professional level in China.

== Honours ==
=== Domestic ===
Red Star Medal of the Chinese Soviet Republic (2nd Class Medal) (1933)
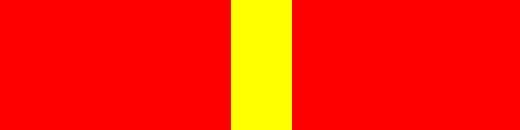
Order of 1 August (1st Class Medal) (1955)
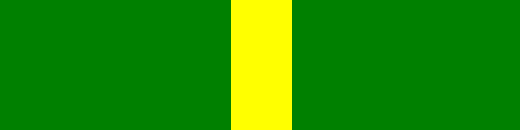
Order of Independence and Freedom (1st Class Medal) (1955)
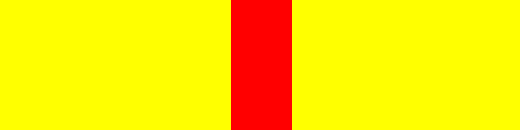
Order of Liberation (1st Class Medal) (1955)

=== Foreign ===
Grand Commander of the Order of the Union of Burma (Burma, 4 January 1961)
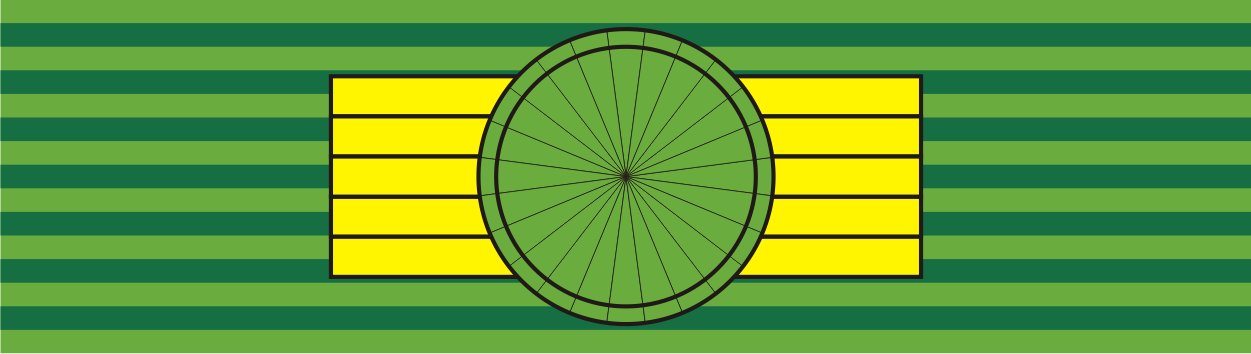
Grand Cross of the Royal Order of Sowathara (Cambodia, 18 February 1956)
Knight Grand Cross of the Royal Order of Cambodia (Cambodia, 25 December 1960)
Grand Cordon of the Order of the Nile (Egypt, 14 December 1963)
Second Class of the Star of the Republic of Indonesia (Indonesia, 29 March 1961)

== See also ==
- List of officers of the People's Liberation Army
- Historical Museum of French-Chinese Friendship

== Notes ==
Government offices
Preceded by Zhao Zukang	Mayor of Shanghai; 1949–1958	Succeeded by Ke Qingshi
Preceded by Zhou Enlai	Minister of Foreign Affairs; 1958–1972	Succeeded by Ji Pengfei
Party political offices
Preceded by Rao Shushi	Secretary of the CPC Shanghai Committee; 1950–1954	Succeeded by Ke Qingshi
Academic offices
New title	President of the China Foreign Affairs University; 1955–1969	Succeeded by Liu Chun; Closed until 1980
