= Rui Xingwen =

Chinese politician

Rui Xingwen (Chinese: 芮杏文; pinyin: Ruì Xìngwén; 1 April 1927 – 5 June 2005) was a Chinese politician who served as the Party Chief of Shanghai from 1985 to 1987, and as a member of the Secretariat of the 13th Central Committee of the Chinese Communist Party beginning in 1987. He was born in Lianshui County, Jiangsu, and joined the Chinese Communist Party in 1945. He died prior to an illness on 5 June 2005.

Party political offices
Preceded by Chen Guodong	Party Secretary of Shanghai; 1985–1987	Succeeded by Jiang Zemin
