= Rao Shushi =

Chinese communist

- 饶漱石
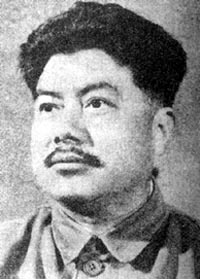
- Premier: Zhou Enlai

Party Secretary of Shanghai
- In office 1949–1950
- Premier: Zhou Enlai
- Preceded by: Position established
- Succeeded by: Chen Yi

Head of the Organization Department of the Chinese Communist Party
- In office 1953–1954
- Preceded by: Peng Zhen
- Succeeded by: Deng Xiaoping

Personal details
- Born: 1903 Jiangxi Province, Qing Empire
- Died: 1975 (aged 71–72) Beijing, People's Republic of China
- Party: Chinese Communist Party

Rao Shushi (simplified Chinese: 饶漱石; traditional Chinese: 饒漱石; pinyin: Ráo Shùshí; Wade–Giles: Jao Shu-shih; 1903—1975) was a Chinese politician and a Chinese Communist Party (CCP) leader before he was purged in 1954 alongside Gao Gang. He was imprisoned in 1955 and died in custody in 1975.

== Early years ==
As a native of Lingchuan (灵川), Jiangxi, Rao was among the few senior leaders of early stage of CCP who received a higher education. He became educated at Shanghai University in his early days and later joined the Chinese Youth, and turned into a CCP member in 1925. Around 1928 Rao worked in the northeast of Jiangxi with central delegations of CCP. Then he was sent to Zhejiang to mobilize youth, and once was Secretary of Communism Youth League for that province. When the 1920s revolution was oppressed by Kuomintang, Rao went abroad for study in England, France and the Soviet Union for approximately a year. He went back to China and worked in northeast China in 1929, being appointed as the Secretary of Communism Youth League, once as Acting General Secretary of CCP of the northeast, as the superior of Liu Shaoqi, who was Propaganda Minister of the CCP northeast division. As Liu was so young and had been voted as Central Commissioner of CCP in the Sixth National Congress of CCP, he was the one who was most likely to get promoted as General Secretary of the northeast CCP, and Liu actually attained the position before long, which brought great threat to Rao and sowed the seeds of resentment and jealousy for several decades.

Between 1930 and 1931, Rao was put in jail by Kuomintang for more than a year. After that he was released in 1932 and transferred to Shanghai to work on labor union, once as Propaganda Minister and Secretary General of Chinese State Labor Union, while his rival Liu became superior again as the Chairman of China State Labor Union.

In 1935 Rao was sent to study abroad in Soviet Union again, and in 1936 to the United States and France to do alliance work with Chinese living overseas, in which he published several newspaper such as Herald, Motherland Defence Times to publicize CCP policies on alliance against Japanese.

== Return to China ==
In 1939 Rao returned to China and worked in the New 4th Army, acting as Deputy General Secretary of Southeast Bureau of CCP. In 1941 when New 4th Army was attacked by Kuomintang army and lost most of its senior leaders, Rao had to work for Liu again, who was appointed as Commissar, and Rao as Acting Director of Political Department. Furthermore, the Central Committee of CCP decided to merge Southeast Bureau with Central Plain Burean into Central China Bureau, Liu as general secretary, Rao as his deputy.

In 1942, Rao replaced Liu who was called back to Yan'an as Acting general secretary and Commissar of New 4th Army. In the Seventh National Congress of CCP in 1945, Rao was voted as Central Commissioner, which meant he had entered the central stage of political life of CCP, and in August of the same year, both of his acting position turned into regularity.

In 1946, Rao was one of the CCP delegates to work with delegates of Kuomintang and the United States on peace talks, with rank of Lieutenant General, many of his counterparts who got rank of Colonel General and General after they defeated Kuomintang in 1949 only got rank of Major General at that time, which could indicated Rao's appeal and importance to Mao Zedong. After the outbreak of Chinese civil war, Rao held the position of Commissar of Shandong Field Army, East China Field Army and East China Military Area, which controlled troops more than 360,000. In 1948 Rao was appointed as General Secretary of East China Bureau of CCP. Although Chen Yi as Commander was No1 in East China but he only took in charge of the military, in contrast to Rao's having more influence on cadres appointment and promotion, which built his power base in East China.

== Post-People's Republic of China establishment and death ==
After the formal establishment of People's Republic of China in 1949, Rao held the position of Chairman of Military and Political Committee of East China besides General Secretary of East China Bureau of CCP. And in the same year, Rao, Gao Gang, Lin Biao, Peng Dehuai, Liu Bocheng were appointed respectively as the Chairman of East China, Northeast China, South Central China, Northwestern China and Southwestern China.

In 1953 Rao was transferred to Beijing and got promotion as Minister of Organization Department of CCP, which was in charge of senior cadres promotion and candidate recommendation. It was said that Gao Gang who was transferred to Beijing in 1953 too, competed with Liu Shaoqi as heir to Mao Zedong, exploiting Rao's hostilities to Liu and set up ally with Rao. Unfortunately, Gao and Rao obviously underestimated Mao's fear of being a puppet and Liu's influence in the CCP. Both of them were purged in 1954 and stripped of CCP membership in 1955.

Gao Gang expressed his resistance by way of suicide in 1954, Rao was put in jail in humiliation in 1955. After ten years in jail, Rao suffered from schizophrenia. Mao showed his clemency by releasing Rao and taking Rao custody in a farm until his death in 1975.

Party political offices
Preceded by none	Party Secretary of Shanghai; 1949–1950	Succeeded by Chen Yi
Preceded by Peng Zhen	Head of the Organization Department of the Chinese Communist Party; 1953–1954	Succeeded by Deng Xiaoping
