= Su Zhenhua =

Chinese Communist general and politician

- 苏振华
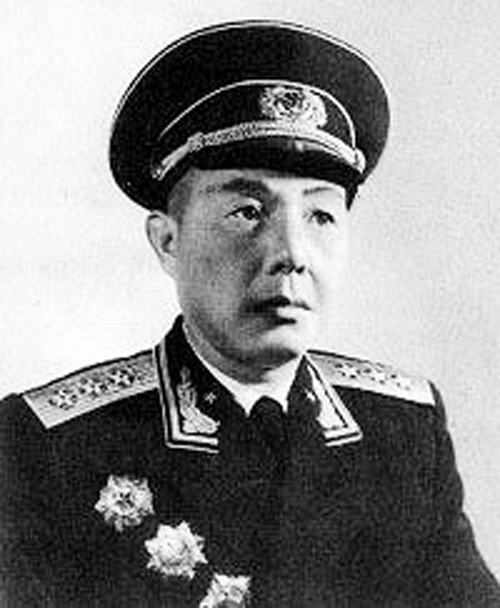

First Secretary of the Guizhou CPC Committee
- In office 1949–1954
- Preceded by: Position created
- Succeeded by: Zhou Lin

Political Commissar of the People's Liberation Army Navy
- In office 1957–1967
- Preceded by: Zhang Aiping
- Succeeded by: Li Zuopeng

Mayor of Shanghai
- In office 1976–1979
- Preceded by: Zhang Chunqiao
- Succeeded by: Peng Chong

Personal details
- Born: 2 June 1912 Yangzhou, Jiangsu, Republic of China
- Died: 7 February 1979 (aged 66)
- Party: Chinese Communist Party
- Occupation: Politician, military officer

Military service
- Allegiance: People's Republic of China
- Branch/service: People's Liberation Army Navy
- Rank: Admiral

Su Zhenhua (simplified Chinese: 苏振华; traditional Chinese: 蘇振華; June 2, 1912 – February 7, 1979), born Su Qisheng (蘇七生), was a Chinese Communist general and politician. He fought for the Communists in the Chinese Civil War. After the founding of the People's Republic, Su became an admiral in the People's Liberation Army Navy, the Party Secretary of Guizhou province, the First Secretary of Shanghai, and a member of the Politburo of the Chinese Communist Party.

Su was born in Pingjiang County, Hunan province. Su joined a guerrilla fighting force in 1926 at age 14, and entered the Communist Youth League three years later. He joined the Red Army in June 1930 and the Communist Party several years later. He participated in the Long March and was instrumental in the Communist takeover of Zunyi. He then served successively in a series of roles as political commissar. In December 1949, following the Communist takeover of Guizhou province, Su became the Party Committee Secretary of Guizhou. In April 1954, he became a deputy political commissar in the PLA Navy. He joined the Central Military Commission in 1959. During the Cultural Revolution, Su was purged and called "a time bomb in the navy planted by Deng Xiaoping." He was rehabilitated in 1972 and became the First Political Commissar of the Navy.

Su played a pivotal role during the arrest of the Gang of Four in 1976, when he was commissioned by Hua Guofeng and Ye Jianying to 'invade' the Xinhua News Agency, central television and radio stations, and the People's Daily headquarters, which were all then under the control of elements friendly to the Gang of Four. In order to prevent a coup by the Gang of Four in their power base of Shanghai, Su was then sent to Shanghai as First Secretary to oversee the party organization in collaboration with Ni Zhifu and Peng Chong.

He was an alternate member of the 8th Central Committee of the Chinese Communist Party, and a full member of the 10th and 11th Central Committees. He was also a member of the 11th Politburo of the Chinese Communist Party. He died on February 7, 1979, and was eulogized with high honours.

Government offices
Preceded by Zhang Chunqiao	Mayor of Shanghai; 1976–1979	Succeeded by Peng Chong
Party political offices
Preceded by Zhang Chunqiao	Chairman of the Revolutionary Committee of Shanghai; Communist Party Secretary of Shanghai; 1976–1979	Succeeded by Peng Chong
Preceded by First	First Secretary of the Guizhou CPC Committee; 1949–1954	Succeeded by Zhou Lin
Military offices
Previous: Liu Daosheng	Director of Political Department of the People's Liberation Army Navy; 1953–1957	Next: Duan Dezhang
Preceded by Zhang Aiping	Political Commissar of the People's Liberation Army Navy; 1957–1967	Succeeded by Li Zuopeng
