= Three-anti and Five-anti Campaigns =

1951–52 Chinese reform movements led by Mao Zedong

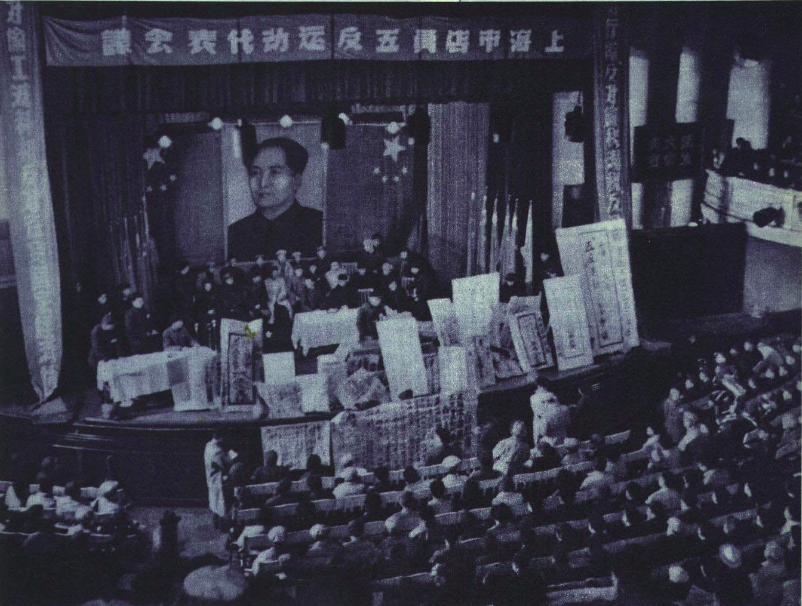
- A campaign conference in Shanghai (1952)
- Native name: 三反五反运动
- Location: China (Nationwide, concentrated in Beijing)
- Date: 1952; January 1952 – April 1952
- Target: Allegedly corrupt officials, government bureaucrats, "bureaucraticism", capitalists and business owners
- Attack type: Political Persecution
- Deaths: 100,000+ (allegedly through suicide)
- Victim: 10,000 (Estimated)
- Perpetrators: Chinese Communist Party, CCP Cadres, political fanatics
- Motive: Attack of political opponents of Mao Zedong, the state bureaucracy, elimination of political enemies and consolidation of power

The Three-anti Campaign (1951) and Five-anti Campaign (1952) (Chinese: 三反五反; pinyin: sān fǎn wǔ fǎn) were reform movements originally issued by CCP Chairman Mao Zedong a few years after the founding of the People's Republic of China in an effort to rid Chinese cities of corruption and enemies of the people. The result turned into a series of campaigns that consolidated Mao's power base by targeting political opponents and capitalists, especially wealthy capitalists.

== The Three-anti campaign ==
Three-anti and Five-anti Campaigns
- Simplified Chinese: 三反五反
- Traditional Chinese: 三反五反
- Literal meaning: Three-anti Campaign
Transcriptions
Standard Mandarin
- Hanyu Pinyin: sān fǎn wǔ fǎn
- Wade–Giles: san^{1} fan^{3} wu^{3} fan^{3}

The Three-anti Campaign was launched in Northeast China at the end of 1951. The initial motivation for the campaigns appears to have been mainly economic and fiscal. To cover the rising costs of the Korean War, it was essential to cut all non-military expenses. To boost the struggling national economy, the government proposed a massive production drive. The "Three-Anti" campaign was subsequently expanded into the "Five-Anti" movement to target business people across the country in order to tax and redistribute wealth. It was aimed at members within the Chinese Communist Party (CCP), former Kuomintang members and bureaucratic officials who were not party members.

The 3 antis imposed were:

- anti-corruption (反贪污)
- anti-waste (反浪费)
- anti-bureaucratism (反官僚主义)

The Three-Antis campaign reduced corruption and resulted in declining trade and market activity. As a result of the economic decline, the Northwest Bureau subsequently revised policies in an effort to continue the "struggle to strike tigers" while stabilizing the economy.

== The Five-anti campaign ==
The Five-Antis Campaign occurred in the midst of the Korean War and was a key campaign in the Communist Party's effort to eliminate private property. It both extracted funds from the private sector to support China's involvement in the war and further restrained the power of Chinese capitalists.

The 5 antis were:

- bribery (反行贿)
- theft of state property (反盗骗国家财产)
- tax evasion (反偷税漏税)
- cheating on government contracts (反偷工减料)
- Theft of state secrets (反盗窃国家经济情报).

An estimated 20,000 cadres and 6,000 trained workers began spying on the business affairs of fellow citizens. The media encouraged compliance with the government policies. Up to 15,000 trained propagandists were working in Shanghai by late 1951. By February 1952, parades of anti-capitalist activists went door-to-door to visit business leaders. It created immense psychological pressure. Shanghai wards were set up to receive criticism letters from any employees. As many as 18,000 letters came in the first week of February 1952, and 210,000 came in by the end of the first month. Cadres of party members would join in on the attack. Some big companies would voluntarily make 1,000 confessions a day to try to protect themselves from the government. A prime example was the Dahua copper company owner who originally over-confessed by claiming to have illegally obtained 50 million yuan. The employees continued to criticize the owner for greater crime until he reconfessed to having obtained 2 billion yuan.

== Mass mobilization ==
The Communist Party effectively used mass organizations to evoke emotions of hate and fear, essential for the class war, through continuous propaganda and successive mass movements. A "mass investigation movement" was launched, encouraging everyone to fulfill their "patriotic duty" by exposing corrupt activities, rewards for informers and safety. Since they heavily relied on the emotions and frustrations of the working class to fuel their campaign, they had to make sure these emotions were not fleeting and translated into actual compliance. Specific stages were introduced to sustain engagement such as enlarging the Three-anti campaign into a Five-anti campaign to keep the sentiments and volatile emotions of the working class growing. The campaigns targeted merchants and industrialists, linking their actions to national misfortunes, especially in the Korean War, to exploit patriotic sentiments and maintain public support. One way this was done was through blaming and accusing merchants and business owners for selling ineffective medicines, producing defective first-aid materials, and providing inferior raincoats, which allegedly caused casualties among soldiers during the war against Korea.

== Role of Chinese youth ==
=== Recruitment and indoctrination ===
Youth were mobilized through organizations, schools, indoctrination classes, and mass meetings (Chen & Chen, 1952, p. 15). In fact, after the Three-anti campaign, many government positions were left empty. Campaigns were launched to recruit new cadres. Government offices across the country were told to enlist new cadres from workers with strong political beliefs and activists from the Three-Anti Campaign which often ended up being young students aiming to achieve these positions within the governments.

=== Family surveillance ===
Young people were instructed to expose their parents' crimes and assist cadres in persuading them to confess. Children were encouraged to compete in persuading or informing on their parents, facing ridicule if their parents were suspected of wrongdoing. Reports in the Communist press highlighted instances where children pleaded with their parents to confess to avoid social ostracism.

== Aftermath ==
=== Effect on China's class structure ===
The Three-Anti and Five-Anti Campaigns significantly reshaped China's class structure by targeting the bourgeois, capitalist ideologies and essentially of western capitalism. These campaigns included a "thought-reform movement" aimed at students, intellectuals, artists, and professionals to eliminate "bourgeois ideas" and promote "proletarian ideology" or more communist/collectivist ways of thinking. Schools and colleges became battlegrounds for these ideological purges, forcing intellectuals to publicly confess and renounce their free market and western believes that aligned with capitalist values. This resulted in a significant change in the class composition of the government and Party membership. Workers with demonstrated support for Mao's communist ideology were promoted to executive and managerial roles in factories and industries, with diminishing importance on their qualifications and literacy rate. In fact standards of membership qualification were reduced to join the Chinese Communist Party. The recruitment and advancement of cadres prioritized those of working-class origin, thereby reinforcing the proletarian nature of the Party and the new Chinese state.

=== Effects on private business owners ===
Many were fined during the Five-Antis campaign or prosecuted on charges such as tax evasion, bribery, misappropriation of public property, stealing state economic information, or cheating on labor materials. As the Communist Party later acknowledged, the amount of illegal income attributed to those punished was often overestimated, and some of those punished were forced to confess, suffered physical violence, or were executed.

According to Mao, "We must probably execute 10,000 to several tens of thousands of embezzlers nationwide before we can solve the problem." There were hundreds of thousands of suicides (though it is debatable whether many of these were voluntary) that were a direct result of these campaigns. The campaigns negatively impacted the economy of big cities such as Shanghai, Tianjin and Chongqing, forcing many businessmen to commit suicide. In Shanghai alone, from January 25 to April 1, 1952, at least 876 people committed suicide.

Through these campaigns, the Communist Party demonstrated that it would no longer protect private business, and that Chinese capitalists would receive treatment no better than foreign. The Korean War initially provided opportunities in Northern China, giving rise to a new class of capitalists, many of whom would be prosecuted under the Marxist policies of the Communist Party. Many of these people eventually borrowed money from the government to pay off government fines, creating a complex financial pattern. A series of anti campaigns were launched by the Chinese government in the following years.

== See also ==
- List of campaigns of the Chinese Communist Party
- Gu Zhun
- Mass line
- Economy of China
- Socialist transformation of ownership of the means of production
