= Ke Qingshi =

Chinese politician (1902–1965)

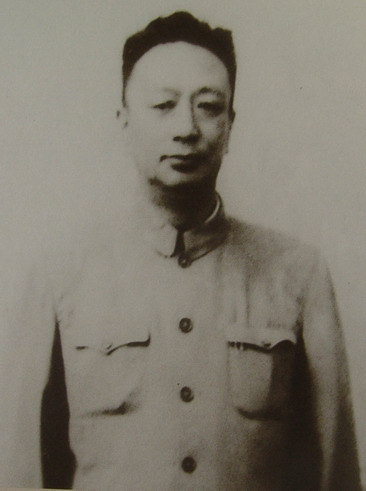

Mayor of Shanghai
- In office 1958–1964
- Preceded by: Chen Yi
- Succeeded by: Cao Diqiu

Party Secretary of Shanghai
- In office 1954–1965
- Preceded by: Chen Yi
- Succeeded by: Chen Pixian

Personal details
- Born: 10 October 1902 She County, Anhui, Qing Empire
- Died: 9 April 1965 (aged 62) Chengdu, Sichuan, China
- Party: Chinese Communist Party
- Children: Ke Liuliu, Ke Youning, Ke Youjin, Ke Youshen

Ke Qingshi (Chinese: 柯庆施; October 10, 1902 – April 9, 1965) was a senior leader of the People's Republic of China and Chinese Communist Party in 1950s and 1960s.

== Biography ==
Born in She County, Anhui Province, Ke joined Chinese Socialist Youth League in 1920, and the Chinese Communist Party in 1922. Ke led the Party in Beijing during the 1930s, until it was sabotaged by the Kuomintang, although Ke escaped arrest because he was in Suiyuan at this time.

During the Yan'an period he served as deputy director of China Women's College and later, since 1939, as deputy director of the Central Committee's United front Department. He was purged during the Rectification Campaign in 1943, allegedly due to his antagonism with Liu Shaoqi, who at that time was second in command of the Party. Following the end of the Rectification Campaign he started rising within the Party and became closer to Mao Zedong.

After the establishment of the People's Republic of China, Ke served as the secretary of CCP Nanjing municipal committee, the mayor of Nanjing, a member of East China Military and Political Commission, Party chief of CCP Jiangsu Provincial Committee, first secretary of CCP Shanghai municipal committee, mayor of Shanghai, the first political commissioner of Nanjing Military Region, first secretary of CCP East China Bureau, and vice premier of the State Council. Ke was a member of 8th CCP politburo.

On April 9, 1965, Ke died in Chengdu. When the Cultural Revolution ended he was criticized because he was one of the few people that knew Mao's plan of purging Liu Shaoqi.
