= Smashing gong-jian-fa =

Persecution of China's judiciary and police during the Cultural Revolution (1966–76)

Smashing gong-jian-fa (simplified Chinese: 砸烂公检法; traditional Chinese: 砸爛公檢法), or smashing the Police, the Procuratorate and the Court, was a movement launched during the Chinese Cultural Revolution (1966–1976) with the support of Mao Zedong. The movement aimed at destroying the "old" public security organizations (公; gong), the public prosecution organizations (检; jian), and the judicial system (法; fa), which were subsequently being placed under military control. More than 34,000 police officers nationwide (some says 340,000) were persecuted during the movement, with over 1,200 killed and over 3,600 crippled.

== History ==
=== Background ===
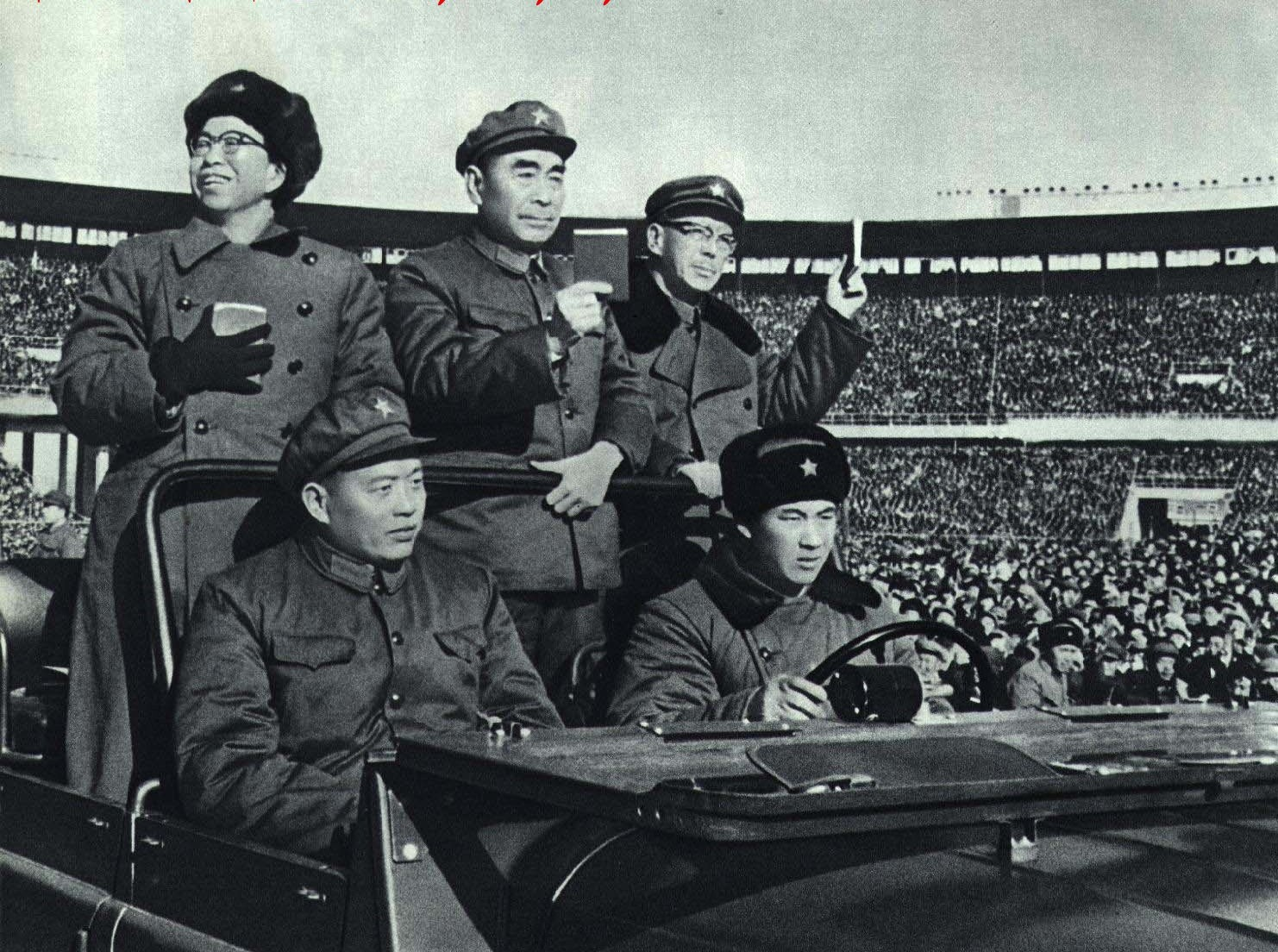
From left to right (standing): Jiang Qing, Zhou Enlai and Kang Sheng. They were holding the Little Red Book of Chairman Mao and were meeting Red Guards in December 1966.

In May 1966, Mao Zedong launched the Cultural Revolution in mainland China. According to official documents of the Chinese Communist Party (CCP), Jiang Qing, Mao's wife and a key member of the Gang of Four, said to the representatives of Red Guards in Beijing in December 1966 that the police, the procuratorate and the court were all copied from capitalist countries, functioning above the CCP and the government, and had fought against Chairman Mao for years. Jiang encouraged the Red Guards to rebel, and suggested placing military control over the public security organizations.

On January 13, 1967, the Six Articles of Public Security was published in order to punish "counter-revolutionaries" and to protect the revolutionary masses of the Cultural Revolution. On January 31, an article titled "In Praise of Lawlessness" ("无法无天"赞) appeared on People's Daily, condemning the "so-called laws" as "capitalist laws" which were meant to be smashed by proletarian rebel groups.

=== Enforcement ===
On August 7, 1967, Xie Fuzhi, then Minister of Public Security, publicly proposed the slogan of "smashing gong-jian-fa" and actively cut off the connections between the Ministry and local public security organizations nationwide. Xie claimed that Chairman Mao mentioned smashing gong-jian-fa at least seven or eight times in front of him, and that Mao was happy about the slogan. Subsequently, a large number of officials in the Ministry of Public Security were persecuted and jailed, as "traitors", "spies", "counter-revolutionaries", or "capitalist roaders". Five former deputy directors were arrested, with Xu Zirong (徐子荣) being persecuted to death. The Ministry of Public Security was effectively placed under military control with Xie Fuzhi staying as the director and Li Zhen being the deputy director, meanwhile the total number of officials working in the Ministry reduced from 1,200 to around 100 in early 1969. Nationwide, within a period of two to three years, more than 34,000 police officers (some say 340,000) were persecuted during the movement: over 1,200 were killed, over 3,600 were crippled, and over 1,300 were arrested and jailed.

In December 1968, the Supreme People's Procuratorate as well as all local procuratorates in mainland China were abolished, and the officials in the Supreme People's Procuratorate were sent to labor camps such as the May Seventh Cadre School in February 1969. At the same time, the courts in mainland China were also "trimmed" and were taken over by the Military Control Committee (军事管制委员会), which became a tool of the CCP to persecute "counter-revolutionaries" and class enemies. Consequently, judicial interpretation became nothing more than an explanation of the CCP's policies that superseded the law. Legal workers were among the first groups of subjects to be sent to the rural areas in order to receive "re-education" from peasants, and the only law in mainland China at the time was the words of Chairman Mao and a few others.

== See also ==
- Revolutionary committee
- January Storm
- Seizure of power
- Rebel Faction
- Cleansing the Class Ranks
- Red August
