= Left communism in China =

Radical anarchist and Marxist thought after the Cultural Revolution

In the People's Republic of China since 1967, the terms "ultra-left" and "left communist" (simplified Chinese: 共产主义左翼; traditional Chinese: 共產主義左翼; pinyin: Gòngchǎn zhǔyì zuǒyì) refers to political theory and practice self-defined as further "left" than that of the central Maoist leaders at the height of the Cultural Revolution. The terms are also used retroactively to describe some early 20th century Chinese anarchist orientations. As a slur, the Chinese Communist Party (CCP) has used the term "ultra-left" more broadly to denounce any socialist orientation it considers further "left" than the party line or "left in form, but right in essence". The accused position does not need to actually represent a left communist tendency to be denounced by the Party as such. According to the latter usage, the CCP Central Committee — disapproving of the turmoil brought about during the Cultural Revolution — posthumously denounced Mao Zedong in 1978 as having been "ultra-left" and deviant from the party line in the period from 1956 until his death in 1976.

This article only concerns:

1. the self-defined ultra-left of the Cultural Revolution (GPCR)
2. more recent theoretical trends and tendencies who have drawn inspiration from the ultra-left of the GPCR, China's anarchist legacy, and international left-communist traditions.

== Beginning of the concept ==
The "ultra-left" argued for a change to the system of organization prevalent in the Cultural Revolution. While they agreed with the revolutionary goals of the "Revolutionary Committees", they worried that these new committees contained only the same old organizational structure. In this sense, they drew on a classical Maoist concern with the persistence of capitalist prerogatives or bourgeois right. The masses could achieve democratic control over production and distribution only through "a new political power of the Paris Commune type".

When the central Maoist leaders launched the GPCR in the spring of 1966, they launched a campaign for students and academics to criticize "bourgeois" or otherwise "counter-revolutionary" ideas within China's "superstructural" apparatus. As the Central Committee put it in August:

Although the bourgeoisie has been overthrown, it is still trying to use the old ideas, culture, customs, habits, practices, traditions, philosophies, and thinking of the exploiting classes to corrupt the masses, capture their minds and endeavour to stage a comeback. The proletariat must do the exact opposite: it must meet head-on every challenge of the bourgeoisie in the ideological field and use the new ideas, culture, customs and habits of the proletariat to change the mental outlook of the whole of society. At present, our objective is to struggle against and overthrow those persons in authority who are taking the capitalist road, to criticize and repudiate the reactionary bourgeois academic 'authorities' and the ideology of the bourgeoisie and all other exploiting classes and to transform education, literature and art and all other parts of the superstructure not in correspondence with the socialist economic base, so as to facilitate the consolidation and development of the socialist system.

Although the 16 Points called on not only students but also "the masses of the workers, peasants, soldiers, revolutionary intellectuals, and revolutionary cadres" to carry out this struggle and although it encouraged activists to "institute a system of general elections, like that of the Paris Commune, for electing members to the Cultural Revolutionary groups and committees and delegates to the Cultural Revolutionary congresses", this and other proof of the central Maoist leaders made clear that this was to be wen (文) struggle rather than a wu (武) struggle. The leaders used these terms to emphasize that "martial" (wu) or physical violence should be avoided in favor of "verbal" (wen) struggle (big-character posters, debates, rallies and so on); though the 16 Points announced the GPCR, a great political revolution, armed struggle or challenge towards armies was not excepted. The rationale was that China's economic structure or "base" had already completed its transition to socialist productive relations (Mao had announced this "good news" in 1956), so now the next logical step before full communization was to complete the superstructural transformation. After the conservative Lin Biao made a failed coup, Mao recognized: "Even now China practices an eight-grade wage system, distribution according to work and exchange through money, and in all this differs very little from the old society. What is different is that the system of ownership has been changed. Our country at present practices a commodity system, the wage system is unequal, too, as in the eight-grade wage scale, and so forth. Under the dictatorship of the proletariat such things can only be restricted. Therefore, if people like Lin Biao come to power, it will be quite easy for them to rig up the capitalist system. That is why we should do more reading of Marxist-Leninist works". Zhang Chunqiao took some measures on the direct management of workers and peasants in Shanghai.

When in late 1966 over a million workers in Shanghai extended their activism into a general strike calling for improved salaries and democratic control over workplace management and city governance, Maoist worker representatives such as Wang Hongwen criticized some demands as "economistic" violation (which referred to another strategy of capitalist-roader Cao Diqiu to bribe workers and cause crisis) of point 14 of the 16 Points: "embrace the revolution while stimulating production (抓革命，促生产)". With some police assistance, these representatives managed to silence the more radical rank-and-file demands (called "far-rightist under a leftist form") and absorb their energy into the nominal January Storm, which replaced the city government and party committee with a Shanghai People's Commune ruled by Wang and Zhang Chunqiao. Some intransigent rebels called for democratic control over the Commune and even the abolition of all "heads". When Mao heard of this, he told Zhang to transform the Commune into a revolutionary committee in which mass representatives would share power with army and party representatives and recommended that this model of "power seizure" be propagated throughout China lest people get the wrong idea from Shanghai's invocation of the Paris Commune.

It was out of this momentary radicalization of GPCR mass politics and its sudden suppression and redirection that the ultra-left currents were born under the direct order from Zhou Enlai, first independently within rebel groups scattered throughout China, then by late 1967 in increasing dialogue until their suppression during the following years. The earliest record GPCR scholar Wang Shaoguang has found of something resembling an ultra-left position is an open letter from two high school students to Lin Biao, published under the pseudonym Yilin-Dixi in November 1966.

The Shengwulian was a self-styled ultraleft group, and was the GPCR's most famous such group. It sought to emulate the Paris Commune as the historical example of popular power and argued that China's "new bureaucratic bourgeoisie" would have to be destroyed to establish a genuinely egalitarian society. The group's significant political writings include its Program and Yang Xiguang's "Whither China?" Whither China? argued that the central conflict in China during the Cultural Revolution was not between Mao Zedong's proponents and opponents, or between the proletariat and the former wealthy, but instead between the masses and a "Red capitalist class" that was "decadent" and impeding historical progress.

== See also ==
- Anarchism in China
- Mao-Spontex
- Maoism
- New class
