= Xiang River Storm and Thunder =

Red Guards organization in Hunan, China

The Maoist Red Guards Xiang River Storm and Thunder Advancement Column (simplified Chinese: 毛泽东主义红卫兵湘江风雷挺进纵队; traditional Chinese: 毛澤東主義紅衛兵湘江風雷挺進縱隊; pinyin: Máozédōng zhǔyì hóng wèibīng xiāngjiāng fēngléi tǐngjìn zòngduì), better known simply as the Xiang River Storm and Thunder (simplified Chinese: 湘江风雷; traditional Chinese: 湘江風雷; pinyin: Xiāngjiāng fēngléi), was a Maoist rebel group founded in October 1966 with the help of the rebel organizations in Beijing during the Cultural Revolution. By early 1967, it had become the largest rebel organization in Hunan, with over one million members.

== History ==
The organization was established in mid-October 1966 and was supported by the rebels in Beijing. The organization takes its name from a river that flows through Hunan, the Xiangjiang River. The organization grew thereafter until the conflict in Shanghai spilled over into Hunan, creating a confrontation between the organization and the People's Liberation Army (PLA). In January 1967, some disgruntled PLA members formed an alliance with the Xiang River Storm and Thunder, and the following month, senior PLA officers called for the suppression of the Xiang River Storm and Thunder, citing the "black five categories" as the reason.

The Xiang River Storm and Thunder resumed its activities after the summer of 1967, after which a member became involved in the local revolutionary committee. However, the Xiang River Storm and Thunder and the other rebels still had serious disagreements over whether they should cooperate with the original government. Much later that year, a significant portion of the members of the Xiang River Storm and Thunder were involved in the founding of the Hunan Provincial Proletarian Revolutionary Great Alliance Committee.

On February 21, 1968, the Xiang River Storm and Thunder and other major rebel organizations announced that they were disbanding and joining the local revolutionary committee.
