= Hangzhou incident =

1975 industrial actions and violent conflicts in mainland China

- Part of the Cultural Revolution
- Date: 1974 - 1975
- Location: Hangzhou, Zhejiang, China
- Goals: Seizure of power
- Methods: Industrial action; Violent struggle
- Result: Suppression of the uprising: Martial law imposed; Military occupation of factories; Local officials replaced

Parties
Rebels: Zhejiang Provincial Revolutionary Rebel United Headquarters; Red Storm	People's Republic of China: Chinese Communist Party; People's Liberation Army; Public Security Corps

Lead figures
Zhang Yongsheng; Weng Senhe; He Xianchun	Mao Zedong; Wang Hongwen; Deng Xiaoping; Tan Qilong

The Hangzhou incident of July 1975 was a series of industrial actions and violent struggles among the industrial workers in the city of Hangzhou, Zhejiang during the Cultural Revolution, which ended with a massive deployment of People's Liberation Army troops into the city and factories in July 1975.

== Background ==
In January 1967 during the "power seizure phase" of the Cultural Revolution in Zhejiang, the officially sanctioned Maoist rebel organization, the Zhejiang Provincial Revolutionary Rebel United Headquarters (Chinese: 浙江省革命造反联合总指挥部; pinyin: Zhèjiāng shěng gémìng zàofǎn liánhé zǒng zhǐhūibù, subsequently United Headquarters) organized a rally to humiliate and attack Jiang Hua, then the first secretary of the Communist Party Zhejiang Provincial Committee. But another rebel organization, the Red Storm (Chinese: 红色暴动派; pinyin: Hóngsè bàodòngpài) broke up its rally, allegedly backed by provincial party elites, allowing Jiang to fly to safety in Beijing. This started a row between the two rebel groups, which lasted during the next few years during the Cultural Revolution in Zhejiang. Many armed struggles and political struggle occurred throughout major cities in the province. In 1969, when the tide of "leftism" subsided, both organizations formally disbanded, but the core members retained some sort of underground organization.

In early 1974, the Anti-Lin Anti-Confucius campaign took place, and some activists associated with the old United Headquarters seized opportunity to resume activism to try to take power from the local party elites. The most notable rebel leaders on the United Headquarters side were Zhang Yongsheng, Weng Senhe, and He Xianchun. The rebel leaders controlled the Trade Union Council, which in turn mobilized workers into urban militia who substituted the military and public security forces in keeping social order. The rebel leaders used these urban militia to carry out raids and intimidation against their political opponents. Combined with their allies in the party bureaucracy, they paralyzed the local administration. Many workers feared the violence at their workplaces and this paralyzed production.

In late 1974, both Wang Hongwen and Deng Xiaoping made trips to Hangzhou to try to quell the factional fighting.

== Incident ==
In July 1975, Zhejiang radio reported that more than 10,000 PLA troops were ordered into 13 factories of Hangzhou to "help with production". Three important officials were replaced, as well as a commander in the provincial military district. Tan Qilong who was previously purged was rehabilitated as the military commander. This was the first time since the ascendancy of Lin Biao that the party ordered troops into factories.

== Related event ==
Beside Hangzhou, there were similar dispatch of troops into other areas with factional fighting, for example in Fujian.

== Bibliography ==
- Forster, Keith (1985). The Hangzhou incident of 1975: the impact of factionalism on a Chinese provincial administration (PhD thesis). Adelaide: University of Adelaide. hdl:2440/21447. OCLC 220299984.
- Harris, Nigel (2015) [1978]. The Mandate of Heaven. Chicago: Haymarket Books. pp. 140–143. ISBN 9781608464654. OCLC 915662854.
