= Violent Struggle =

Factional conflicts in China during the Cultural Revolution

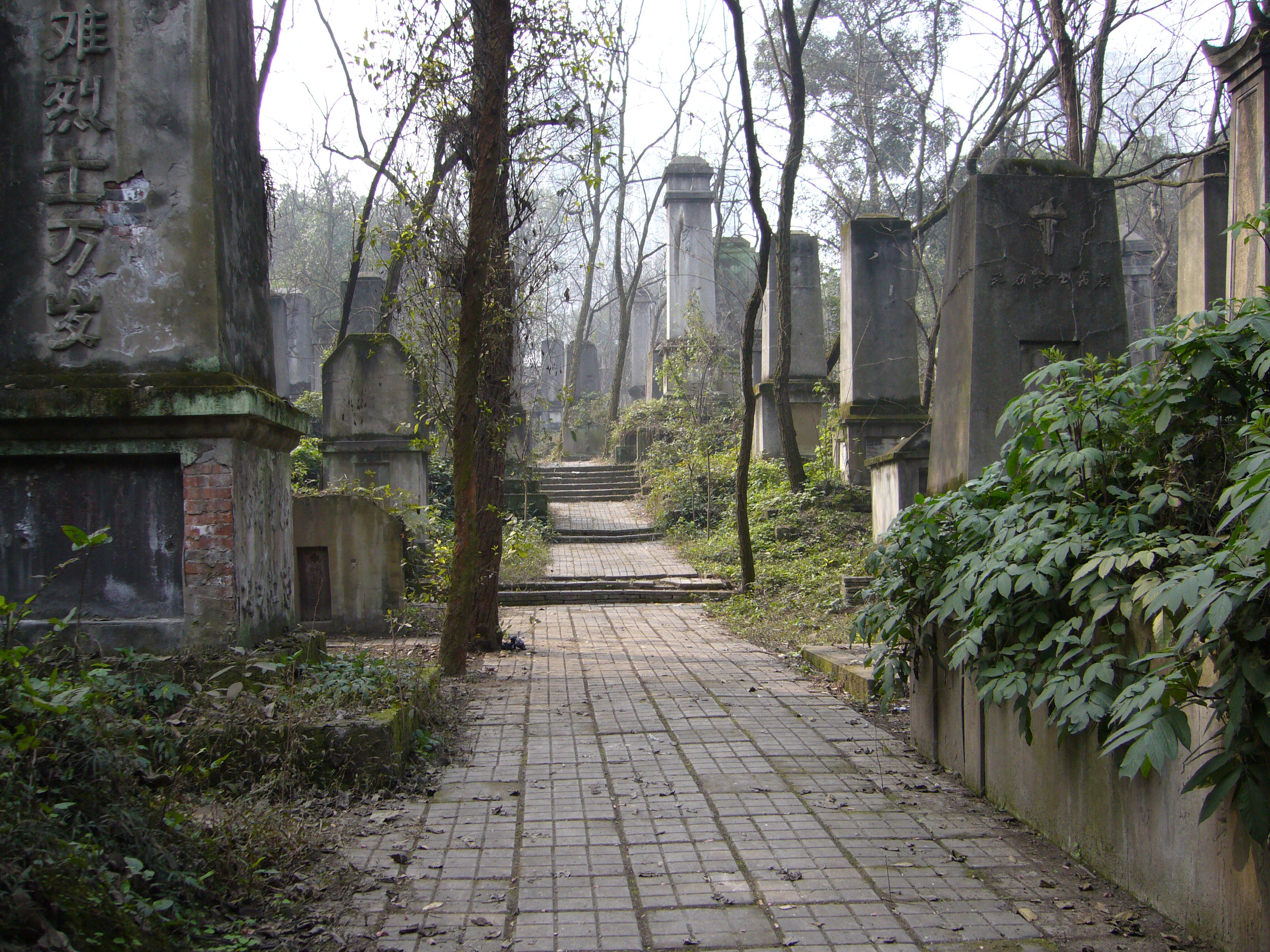
The Cultural Revolution Cemetery in Chongqing, China. At least 1,700 people were killed during the violent faction clash in Chongqing, with 400–500 of them buried in this cemetery.

The Violent Struggle (simplified Chinese: 武斗; traditional Chinese: 武鬥; pinyin: wǔdòu), also known as Wudou or Factional Conflicts, refers to the violent conflicts between different factions (mostly of Red Guards and "rebel groups" composed mostly of students and workers) during the Chinese Cultural Revolution (1966–1976). The factional conflicts started in Shanghai and Chongqing in December 1966, and then spread to other areas of China in 1967 which brought the country to the state of civil war. Most violent struggles took place after the power seizure of rebel groups, and gradually grew out of control in 1968, forcing the Central Committee of the Chinese Communist Party as well as the Chinese government to take multiple interventions in the summer of 1968.

During much of the fighting weapons were either acquired by the rebel groups through raids on arms depots or direct support from local military establishments. Weapons used in armed conflicts included some 18.77 million guns (some say 1.877 million), 2.72 million grenades, 14,828 cannons, millions of other ammunitions and even armored cars and tanks. Researchers have said that the death toll in violent struggles ranged from 300,000 to 500,000, while certain documents from the Chinese Communist Party say 237,000 people were killed and another 7,030,000 were injured or permanently disabled. Notable violent struggles include the battles in Chongqing, in Sichuan, and in Xuzhou.

== History ==
=== Origins ===
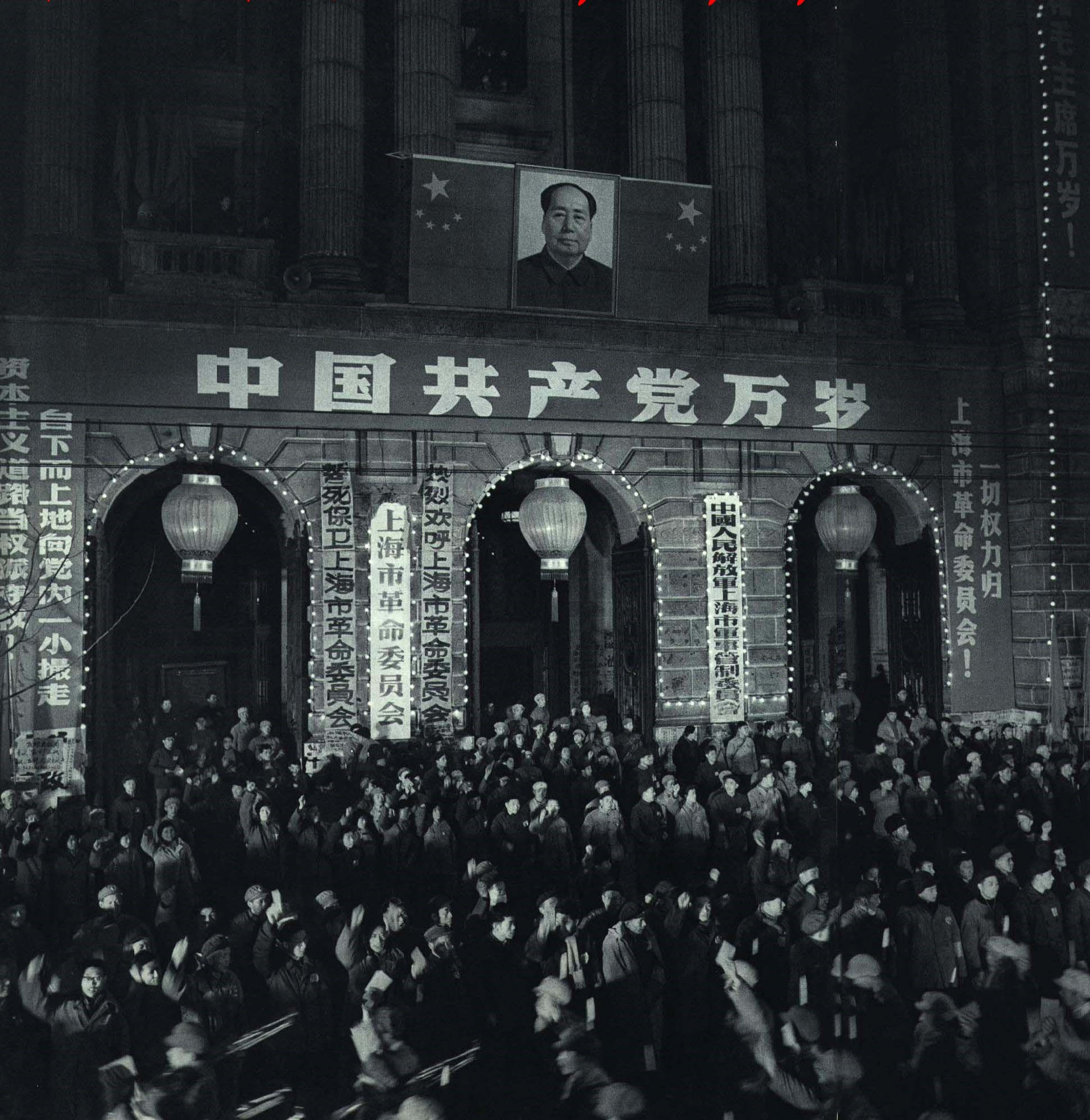
Establishment of the Shanghai Revolutionary Committee, 1967

The violent faction clashes in Shanghai and Chongqing in December 1966 were regarded as the first large-scale violent struggles in mainland China. In January 1967, factions in Shanghai started the "January Storm" during which Shanghai People's Commune was established. After receiving the support from Mao Zedong himself, the "Shanghai model" spread to other regions of China where factions began to grab power from the local governments, establishing the revolutionary committees. These seizures of power were successful in the provinces of Shanxi, Heilongjiang, Shandong and Guizhou with PLA support, but succeeded nowhere else. The violent struggles across China escalated significantly in the summer of 1967 after Jiang Qing, the wife of Mao Zedong, promoted the idea of "Wen Gong Wu Wei (文攻武卫)", meaning "attack with reason, defend with force". During this time, a dizzying array of political groups and factions rose and fell throughout China - a situation which often led to bloody conflict between groups.

=== Motivations and ideology ===
The Cultural Revolution brought to the forefront numerous power struggles both within the Communist Party, and against it from the left. Factional conflict between Red Guard and rebel organizations happened for a wide range of reasons: some purely for the seizure and dominance of political power, others were fought over pre-existing class resentments, while still more struggled to stay afloat in the turmoil of changing alliances. One of the primary reasons for the emerging factionalism was about social discontent and access to privileges. In Guangdong, for instance, fighting between student-based Red Guards was often predicated on the ability to apply to join the Communist Youth League and perceived prospects for upward advancement. Andrew Walder writes that the political orientation of Red Guard factions could often reflect the social group of its members, with deep-seated economic and social motivations being a driver for conflict. One of the decisive factors pushing students to conservative or radical factions was their relation to the Maoist system of ranking people by their "class background." Many of those lacking a 'good class background', and its associated privileges, were more likely to engage in left factions. Students in families with cadre associations skewed conservative, and were more likely to defend existing political authorities or otherwise pursue much more moderate actions. These 'conservative' factions tended to characterize the radicals as full of 'petty-bourgeois revolutionary spirit' and acting against proper revolutionary authorities. Factions existed not just among students and workers, but also within the People's Liberation Army. Wading into a complicated web of shifting alliances and political positions, local army units often had to contend with the dual tasks of interpreting contradictory orders from above, and then actually carrying them out within the constraints of chaotic regional conditions. For example, from 1967 to 1969, military units in Xuzhou became embroiled in civilian factional politics and sharply divided into 'Kick' (tipai 踢派) and 'Support' (zhipai 支派) factions based on whether they wished to support the left or kick it out. These splits were driven by ideological beliefs, personal rivalries and ambitions, as well as pragmatic attempts to make sense of orders from the central government.

Splits between factions were not solely a question of broader social issues though. Questions of strategy and tactics were also a factor. In these debates, the question of whether a faction was 'radical' or 'conservative' could become increasingly muddy. As a rule, the clean division between 'conservative' and 'radical' became harder to sustain as 1967 progressed, and sub-groupings would drive conflict even within existing factions. An illustrative example is the situation in Guangzhou, where a group of 'radicals' collapsed into two distinct factions over the question of whether power should be seized immediately (and thus minimizing both public participation and shakeup of party officials) or later on with a broader political base to draw from. These sub-factions, in different localities, sometimes collapsed into even further infighting over minute ideological points, which were driven forward by changing circumstances on the national stage. Often in these cases, there was no such distinct social class that these factions represented. The fighting increasingly became an attempt to dominate the political scene and ensure the continued control of one's own faction at the expense of others. Events going on at the elite level of politics had a significant influence on the movement as well, and a crucial part of Violent Struggle was the constant attempt not to end up on the wrong side of the political battle being waged in the bureaucracy and in the halls of power. Attempts to win elite favor could lead competing factions to engage in a spiral of increasingly radical acts that were detached from the core ideological beliefs of its members, as happened with escalating violent confrontations at Tsinghua University throughout 1967 and 1968. Sometimes, support received from the center could be arbitrary or based on misperceptions about the relative conformity that one faction had versus their rivals. Nevertheless, at varying points the passion and political convictions of factions participants were equally important determiners and should not dismissed in favor of wholly cynical and pragmatic motivations.

=== Escalation and height ===
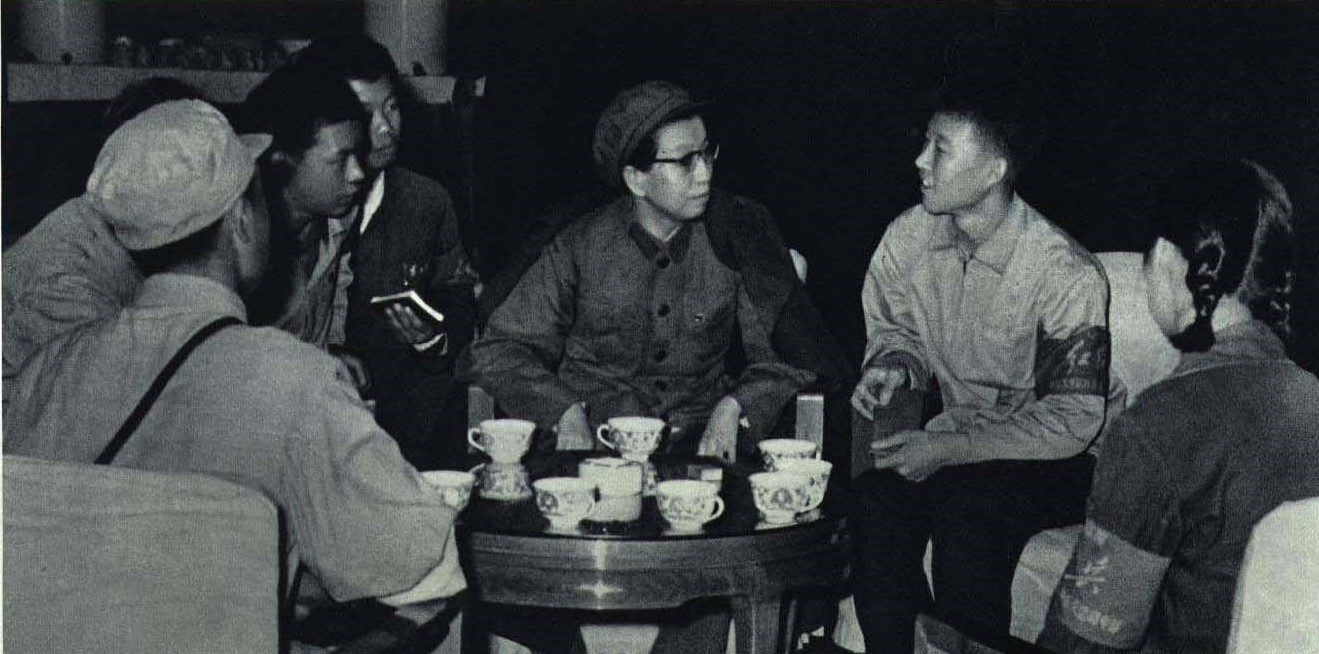
Jiang Qing, the wife of Mao Zedong at the time, talking with Red Guards (August 1967)

Much of the early phase of faction clashes involved street brawls, brick throwing, and low level violence. However, after the Wuhan incident on July 20, 1967, Jiang Qing thought that counter-revolutionaries appeared in the military and thus publicly proposed the idea of "Wen Gong Wu Wei (文攻武卫)", or "attack with reason, defend with force". Jiang's idea was published by Wenhui Bao on July 23. At the same time, Chairman Mao called for a "nationwide arming of the left", which emboldened radicals and swayed some PLA formations onto the side of the rebels. Faction clashes subsequently entered into a new phase of violence which rocked the nation. Weapons such as guns, grenades, cannons and even tanks were used in battles. According to some documents, different factions received weapons from supporting army branches, while some factions even raided local armories or created their own guns. The total number of guns used in the violent struggles was approximately 18.77 million (some say 1.877 million). These developments brought many regions of the country into a state of virtual civil war.

=== End ===
In the summer of 1968, the violent struggles had grown out of control in a number of places, Ultimately, the PLA was the only organization which was capable of restoring order to the country, and so the Central Committee of the Chinese Communist Party was forced to issue several announcements to stop the battles. As a result, the factions gradually turned in their weapons and dissolved their armed teams, or were crushed by the force of the PLA. Factional violence on a local level declined precipitously after this point, and the purges carried out during the Cleansing the Class Ranks campaign would herald the end of this portion of the Cultural Revolution.

== Death toll ==
Chinese researchers have pointed out that the death toll in violent struggles ranged from 300,000 to 500,000. Serious cases of violent struggles included the battles in Luzhou, Xuzhou and Chongqing, each of which saw deaths of at least thousands of people.

An official document (建国以来历史政治运动事实) from the Chinese Communist Party in 1996 claims that 237,000 people died due to the violent struggles, and another 7,030,000 were injured or permanently disabled.

Andrew G. Walder argues, however, that the death toll caused by the violent struggles committed at the hand of insurgent Red Guards or rebel groups is only a fraction of the deaths caused by the violent purges at the hands of state forces, for example during the Cleansing the Class Ranks campaign. Walder put the deaths at the hand of insurgent organizations from 1966 to 1971 at 37,046. In comparison, Walder put the deaths at the hand of state forces during the same period at 130,378.

== See also ==
- Power seizure
- Revolutionary committee
- January Storm
- Struggle session
- Red Terror
- Hangzhou incident
- Wuhan incident
