= Shanghai Revolutionary Committee =

Political authority in Shanghai from 1967 to 1979

Overview
- Type: Provincial revolutionary committee
- Elected by: State Council (de facto); Shanghai Municipal People's Congress (suspended)

History
- Established: 23 February 1967
- Disbanded: December 1979
- Preceded by: Shanghai Municipal Committee
- Succeeded by: Shanghai Municipal People's Government

Leadership
- Chairman: Peng Chong (final)
- Deputy Chairmen: Ni Zhifu (final)
- Executive organ: Standing Committee

Meeting place
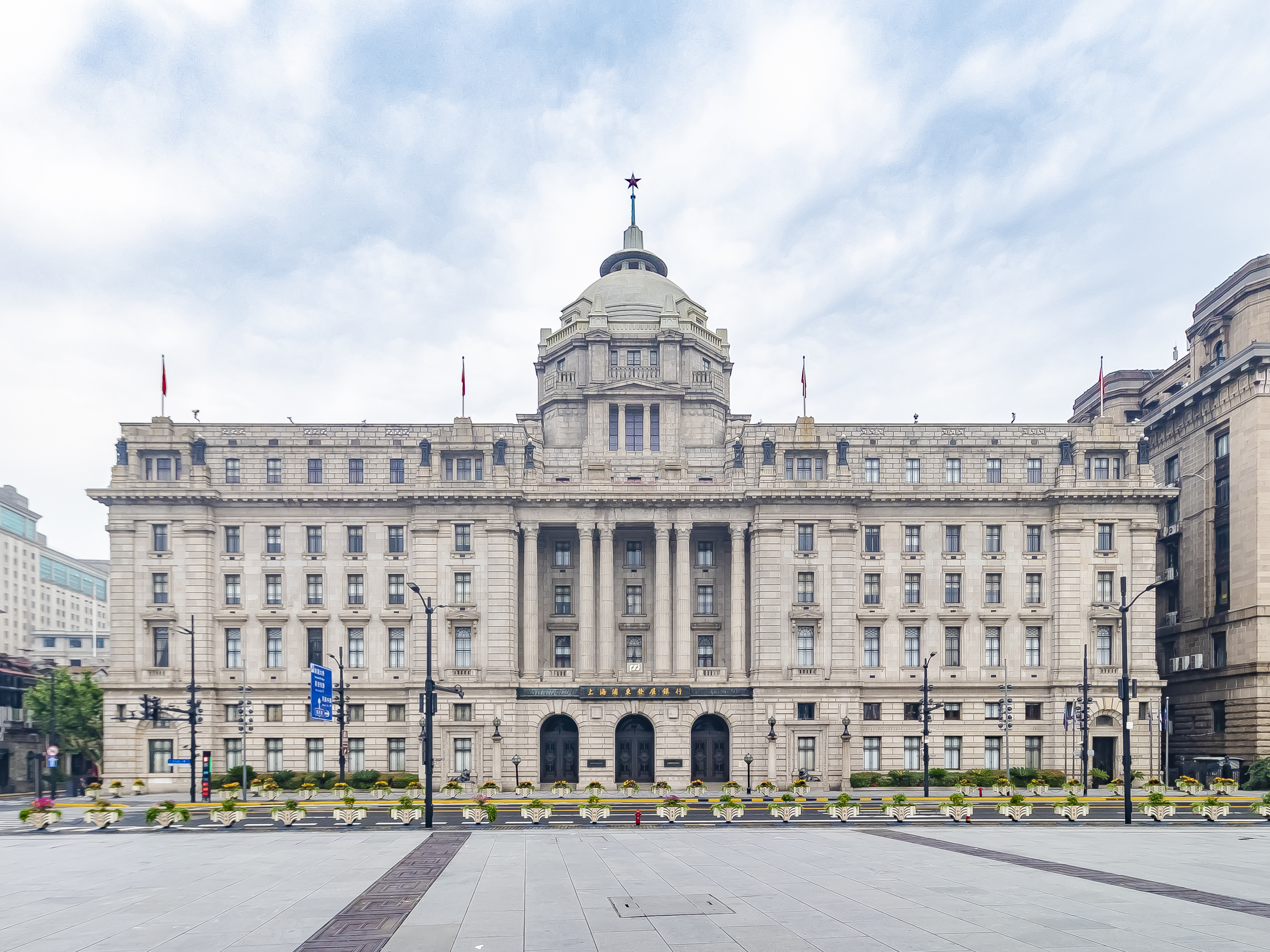
- Municipal Government Building, 12, The Bund

The Shanghai Revolutionary Committee was a revolutionary committee that had administered the city of Shanghai, People's Republic of China between 1967 and 1979. It was established on 24 February 1967, following the collapse of the Shanghai People's Commune during the Cultural Revolution, and replaced the former Shanghai Municipal Committee of the Chinese Communist Party following its overthrow in the January Storm. The revolutionary committee was the first of its kind in the PRC, and employed a "triple alliance" model where military personnel, revolutionary cadres, and the revolutionary masses jointly administered the government. Zhang Chunqiao was the committee's first chairman, while Peng Chong was its last chairman. The committee was eventually disbanded during reforms in December 1979, when the Shanghai Municipal People's Government was reintroduced.

== Background ==
During the Cultural Revolution, influenced by Maoist leaders of the Cultural Revolution Group and the publication of the Sixteen Articles, rebel factions in Shanghai overthrew the Shanghai Municipal Committee of Chen Pixian and Cao Diqiu in January 1967. On 5 February, rebel factions under the leadership of Zhang Chunqiao created a new transitional revolutionary committee under the Shanghai People's Commune. It was modeled after the Paris Commune, and was to adopt direct democracy as its method of electing its leadership. The events in Shanghai influenced other provinces to undertake similar actions, which resulted in the collapse of preexisting bureaucratic authorities, replaced by revolutionary committees modeled after Shanghai.

However, on 12 February 1967, following a discussion between Mao Zedong and top CRG leaders, Mao retracted his support for the commune as he was concerned that it would reduce the power of the Central Committee and State Council. On 23 February, the decision was made to dissolve the commune and reform it as the Shanghai Revolutionary Committee, with the temporary committee made permanent. A "triple alliance" system was employed in the committee, consisting of PLA military personnel, CRG revolutionary cadres, and the revolutionary masses from thirty-two major rebel factions in the city. In 1971, the Shanghai Municipal Committee was reconvened, and some of the powers of Shanghai Revolutionary Committee's powers were transferred to it. In December 1979, the Shanghai Municipal People's Government was reestablished, replacing the Shanghai Revolutionary Committee.

== Organisation ==
Throughout different periods of time, there were nine departments in the Shanghai Revolutionary Committee. Several departments originally composed within the Shanghai Municipal People's Government were suspended due to political changes in the Cultural Revolution, and were not resumed until the abolition of the authority in December 1979.

- Combined planning statistical department (after October 1969)
- Industrial and transport department (after April 1968)
- Infrastructural development department (after January 1977)
- Rural development department (after February 1968)
- Science and technical department (after March 1967)
- Economic trade department (after May 1967)
- Culture and education department (after October 1968)
- Sports department (after June 1967)
- Family planning department (after December 1973)

== Leadership ==
=== Directors ===
- Zhang Chunqiao (February 1967 – October 1976)
- Su Zhenhua (October 1976 – January 1979)
- Peng Chong (January 1979 – December 1979)

==== First deputy directors ====
- Yao Wenyuan (February 1967 – October 1976)
- Ni Zhifu (October 1976 – January 1979)
- Vacant (January 1979 – December 1979)

== See also ==
- January Storm
- February Countercurrent
- Gang of Four
