= Scarlet Guards =

Loyalist political organizations formed during GPCR

Scarlet Guard (Chinese: 赤卫队; pinyin: chìwèi duì) organizations were political organizations formed during the Cultural Revolution in China to oppose the more radical Red Guards.

== Origin of term ==
The term "Scarlet Guard" developed in opposition to the term "Red Guard" adopted by student rebels during the Cultural Revolution. The Chinese term translated into English as "Red Guard" -- hongwei bing -- was a new, non-standard phrase coined by the radical students. "Scarlet Guards" used an older term (chiwei dui) which was used to refer to "Red Guards" who fought for the Bolsheviks during the Russian Civil War. This name signaled the Scarlet Guards' political orthodoxy.

== Background ==
The early phase of the Cultural Revolution (1966–1968) was characterized by mass movement and political mobilization. Virtually anyone could create a political organization, with or without the Chinese Communist Party (CCP)'s approval. Radical organizations arose, first in schools and universities, and later in factories and other institutions. Mao Zedong encouraged these Red Guards to "bombard the headquarters" and rebel against "capitalist roaders" within the CCP. Beginning with the January Storm of 1967, a wave of power seizures by radical groups began.

Two forms of Scarlet Guard organizations developed in response to the mobilization of Red Guards. First, Scarlet Guard groups composed of loyal staff within organs of the party-state formed to defend their offices and superiors from rebels and to insulate their superiors from confrontations with them. For example, they responded to rebel groups staging protests or sit-ins at government or party offices. These Scarlet Guard groups existed for a relatively short period: at the October 1966 Central Work Conference convened by Mao, their activities were denounced as examples of the "bourgeois reactionary line" (资产阶级反动路线; zichanjieji fandong luxian).

The second type of Scarlet Guard organizations arose later and only in major cities. These latter groups of Scarlet Guards were composed of industrial workers whose mobilization was aided by the CCP apparatus and its subordinate trade unions. They confronted rebel groups in factories, on school campuses, and eventually in the streets.

A Scarlet Guard organization had a major role during the events of the January Storm in Shanghai. An alliance of radical political organizations known as the Shanghai Workers Revolutionary Rebel General Headquarters organized and presented a list of demands to the Shanghai Municipal Party Committee, with a focus on replacing the old bureaucracy with new political organs that had more widespread support. When their demands were refused, delegates attempted to travel by train to Beijing to meet with the Central Group of the Cultural Revolution but were stopped by the authorities. The impasse ultimately was broken with a negotiated solution that recognized the Workers General Headquarters but required the group to address its grievances locally in Shanghai. Not viewing themselves as bound by the negotiated resolution, local Shanghai party officials leveraged party organizations within factories and the officials trade unions to establish a loyalist Scarlet Guard organization. Composed mainly of skilled workers and technicians, the group called itself the Workers' Scarlet Guards for the Defense of Mao Zedong Thought and ultimately boasted over 800,000 members. It opposed the radicals, but soon condemned the Shanghai Municipal Party Committee for having capitulated. By mid-December 1966, Shanghai was largely divided between the Workers General Headquarters and the Scarlet Guards, who sought to maintain the pre-Cultural Revolution political order. Ultimately, the Scarlet Guards were defeated when the Workers General Headquarters learned how they had been bought off by the local CCP officials and the Workers General Headquarters succeeded in rallying more workers to their side.
