= Shengwulian =

Ultra-left group during Cultural Revolution

Hunan Provincial Proletarian Revolutionary Great Alliance Committee 湖南省无产阶级革命派大联合委员会
- Abbreviation: Shengwulian
- Founded: 1967
- Dissolved: 1968
- Headquarters: Hunan
- Ideology: Left communism
- Political position: Far-left

Shengwulian
- Simplified Chinese: 湖南省无产阶级革命派大联合委员会
- Traditional Chinese: 湖南省無產階級革命派大聯合委員會
- Literal meaning: Hunan Provincial Proletarian Revolutionary Great Alliance Committee
Transcriptions
Standard Mandarin
- Hanyu Pinyin: Húnán shěng wúchǎn jiējí gémìng pài dà liánhé wěiyuánhuì
- Wade–Giles: Hun-an sheng wu-ch'an chieh-chi ko-ming p'ai ta lien-ho wei-yüan-hui

The Shengwulian or Sheng-wu-lien (simplified Chinese: 省无联; traditional Chinese: 省無聯), derived from the Chinese acronym for the full name of Hunan Provincial Proletarian Revolutionary Great Alliance Committee, (Note: "湖南省会无产阶级革命派大联合委员会" [Hunan Capital Proletarian Revolutionary Great Alliance Committee] is the official name in Chinese. However, it is more often referred to as the "湖南省无产阶级革命派大联合委员会" [Hunan Provincial Proletarian Revolutionary Great Alliance Committee] in both Chinese and English.) was a radical ultra-left group formed in 1967 during the Cultural Revolution. The rebel group became known for its opposition to local authorities installed by Beijing and for creatively re-interpreting the Cultural Revolution's official doctrine, becoming active during a period when the political trends of the Cultural Revolution were moving away from mass political mobilization.

In stark contrast to other Red Guard factions during the Cultural Revolution, Shengwulian was notable for its willingness to criticize Mao Zedong from a communist perspective.

== Background ==
The Shengwulian was formed in 1967 during the Cultural Revolution, at a stage when the overall political trends were moving away from mass political movement. It arose in Hunan province. The group attracted many people with grievances from having been marginalized in Chinese social life or having been politically targeted. An organization with loose structure and fluid membership, its ranks included People's Liberation Army veterans, "Black Devils" (victims of political campaigns, especially people categorized as bourgeois rightists in the 1950s), and rusticated urban youth. It had ties with economistic groups and drew broad popular support in Hunan from small neighborhood cooperatives (where wages were generally inferior compared to the state-sector industry). The ultimate commonality was "all had been persecuted or shortchanged by the state and Party apparatus before and during the Cultural Revolution." The Shengwulian comprised more than 20 such organizations, which coordinated their activities through a Central Committee (where a representative from each constituent organization sat) and a smaller standing committee. These groups were forced to unite when the political balance of power swung in favor of rebel Red Guards deemed more reliable by the party center.

Ultimately, the Shengwulian was denounced, including by Kang Sheng, who denigrated the group as "anarchists" and "Trotskyists," and suppressed by the Chinese leadership.

== Ideology ==
The Shengwulian was a self-styled ultra-left group. It sought to emulate the Paris Commune as the historical example of popular power and argued that China's "new bureaucratic bourgeoisie" would have to be destroyed to establish a genuinely egalitarian society. Historian Maurice Meisner writes that one of its inspirations may have been Qi Benyu, one of the last ultra-left intellectuals remaining in the Cultural Revolution Group (and who was purged in 1968 around the same time authorities suppressed the Shengwulian).

The Shengwulian opposed revolutionary committees, arguing that the committees failed to transform the political system and had the practical effect of excluding radical Red Guards from power. The group's tone "was one of frustration at the limitations of the Cultural Revolution, which the Shengwulian faulted for holding back from a structural solution to China's political problems." As Meisner summarized:

The Shengwulian combined the original ideals of the Cultural Revolution with the theory of a new bureaucratic ruling class, a notion Mao had briefly entertained but abandoned ... They praised the Cultural Revolution for having awakened the masses and for having stimulated popular democracy but criticized its leaders proclivity to attack individuals instead of searching for the social class roots of China's social and political problem. They found these roots in China's "new bureaucratic bourgeoisie," which still controlled the old state machine and had usurped the power of the new revolutionary committees. Their proposed remedy was "smashing" the existing state state apparatus in favor of a "People's Commune of China" based on the popular democratic principles of the Paris Commune. The Shengwulian, or at least its leaders, were radical Maoists -- but too radical for Mao in 1968.

Maoist leadership rejected these ideas, but the Shengwulian's views nonetheless spread beyond its local environment in China and also into the West. Its legacy is one of creative re-interpretation of the official doctrine arising during the Cultural Revolution.

The group's significant political writings include its Program and Yang Xiguang's "Whither China?" Whither China? argued that the central conflict in China during the Cultural Revolution was not between Mao Zedong's proponents and opponents, or between the proletariat and the former wealthy, but instead between the masses and a "Red capitalist class" that was "decadent" and impeding historical progress. It was passed hand-to-hand among Rebel Red Guards, spread by authorities as "material to be criticized," and reached a readership of many hundreds of thousands during the Cultural Revolution.

Alluding to Mao's comment that 95% of Party cadres were good or comparatively good while 5% should be purged, the Shengwulian argued that 90% of the cadres formed a red capitalist class that should be removed and replaced by a political system modeled after the Paris Commune.

== Academic analysis ==
Sociologist Andrew G. Walder writes that the Shengwulian's opposition to a "red capitalist class" "did not issue from a coalition of the marginalized, but [was] instead the product of a split over tactics within the rebel movement, a rhetorical framing of diehard resistance that was not widely shared even within the splinter faction that generated the [Whither China?] essay."

According to Jonathan Unger, the Shengwulian became the Cultural Revolution's most famous ultra-left grouping.
