= Wu Di (film critic and historian) =

Wu Di (Chinese: 吴迪; pinyin: Wú Dí; a.k.a. Wuzhala; born 1951) is a film critic and historian based in Beijing. He is the author of the definitive history of the Cultural Revolution in the Chinese autonomous region of Inner Mongolia, as well as editor of a major collection of archival material documenting the development of the film medium in Mao Zedong's China.

== Stir ==
Wu Di caused somewhat of a stir in Chinese academic circles in the winter of 2006–2007 when he published in the journal Contemporary Cinema (当代电影) a powerful critique of plagiarism and declining ethical standards in China's sectors of higher education and film research. In 2007, he founded the Academic Anti-Corruption Work Office, a non-profit organization that supports the exposure and "outing" of members of China's social science and humanities community practicing plagiarism.

In September 2008, together with He Shu, Wu Di launched the electronic journal Remembrance (记忆), currently the only PRC publication of its kind, devoted exclusively to publishing and promoting academic research on the Cultural Revolution.
