= Xiaokai Yang =

Chinese-Australian economist

- 杨小凯
- Born: Yang Xiguang (杨曦光); 6 October 1948; Dunhua, Jilin, China
- Died: 7 July 2004 (aged 55); Melbourne, Victoria, Australia
- Citizenship: Australian

Academic background
- Education: Chinese Academy of Social Sciences; Hunan University; Princeton University

Xiaokai Yang (born as Yang Xiguang; Simplified Chinese: 杨小凯; 6 October 1948 – 7 July 2004) was a Chinese-Australian economist. He was one of the world's pre-eminent theorists in economic analysis, and an influential campaigner for democracy in China.

== Biography ==
=== Early life ===
Yang's family came from Hekou, Xiangtan County, Hunan Province, and he was born in Dunhua, Jilin Province. At the time when he was born, Jilin was just taken by the Fourth Field Army led by Lin Biao. Yang was later taken to Changsha, Hunan and was raised there. Yang's parents were Chinese Communist Party officials. His parents' status meant that he initially had a privileged life, receiving an excellent education by Chinese standards at the time.

=== Life under the Maoist government ===
His life changed dramatically in the early days of the Cultural Revolution. Yang was a Red Guard in Hunan who was part of the Rebel faction Shengwulian. On behalf of the group, Yang wrote and published an influential political treatise titled "Whither China?", a scathing critique of Mao Zedong's communist regime from a farther left perspective.

Yang contended that the essential conflict in China was between the new "red capitalist class", consisting of CCP cadres and their families, and the masses of the Chinese people. This was a left-wing deviation from the view that class conflict was occurring between “capitalist roaders” and “socialist roaders” within the Communist Party itself. Yang's essay was read by hundreds of thousands of Chinese during the Cultural Revolution. It could not be read openly, and was passed secretly between trusted friends, provoking lively debate across China. So great was his influence that some members of the 1980s Democracy Movement in China viewed Yang Xiaokai as "the forerunner of the Thinking Generation".

=== Imprisonment and release ===
Yang was arrested and sent to prison for 10 years. At one point, Yang learned that he was scheduled to be executed, though this never eventuated. Nevertheless, distraught by her son's treatment, Yang's mother, Chen Su, committed suicide.

While in prison, Yang managed to learn English and calculus. He learnt from and deeply admired a fellow prisoner who happened to be a mathematics professor and a devout Christian; but Yang did not convert yet at that time. When he was released, Xiguang (his original name from birth) changed his name to Xiaokai Yang (his childhood nickname), so that he could find a job.

=== Professional career ===
Yang gained admission to the Institute of Economics at the Chinese Academy of Social Sciences with the help of economist Yu Guangyuan, then the deputy director of the Academy. Yu admitted him as a student of mathematical economics. He later joined Hunan University and published two highly influential books on economics. He then studied at Princeton University, where he obtained a Ph.D. in economics.

Following his study at Princeton, Yang accepted a postdoctoral fellowship at Yale University. In 1988, he moved to Australia and took up a position as lecturer at Monash University. He quickly gained widespread international attention, publishing numerous English-language articles and books. He was made senior lecturer in 1989, reader in 1993, and was awarded a personal chair in Economics in 2000. In 1993, he was elected fellow of the Australian Academy of Social Sciences. He was twice nominated for the Nobel Prize in Economics (2002 and 2003).

He collaborated with some of the world's leading economists, including Yew-Kwang Ng and Jeffrey Sachs, the latter of whom stated that "Yang is one of the world's most penetrating and exacting economic theorists, and one of the most creative minds in the economics profession". In 2002, Nobel Prize Winner Professor James M. Buchanan said that: "In my view, the most important and exciting research in economics in the world is done at Monash, and it is done by Xiaokai Yang."

Yang was a neoclassical economist. He is praised by his colleagues for having cleared up many unhelpful digressions in economic writing, and returning the discipline to the fundamental insights of Adam Smith. His work is founded on the ideal that all persons (potential traders) are equal in all relevant respects. He moved from this to develop an extensive explanatory apparatus. His work encompasses equilibria that involve more behavioral adjustments than those defined in orthodox neoclassical models of general equilibrium. According to Buchanan, this approach has major implications for a wide range of issues in economics, such as globalisation, outsourcing, as well as interoccupational and locational mobility.

=== Illness and religious conversion ===
Yang was diagnosed with lung cancer in September 2001. Doctors predicted that it would kill him soon, but he lived more years than initially expected. In 2002, Yang converted to Christianity and made it public, becoming a member of the Anglican Church. Six months later, he was baptized and wrote a second testimony about his new belief in The Bible.

He died on 7 July 2004, survived by his wife, Xiaojuan; and three children, Xiaoxi, James, and Edward. His eventful life is described in his memoir, Captive Spirits: Prisoners of the Cultural Revolution.

== Legacy ==
Yang's major contribution at the time of his death was the development of infra-marginal economics, which are those discrete decisions that dictate future path dependencies.

He was a prolific author in economics, but Yang simultaneously wrote a large body of influential political essays in Chinese, including a best-selling book. He championed democracy, decentralization of Chinese political power, and privatization of the Chinese economy. When he died, Southern Weekend, the most influential reformist magazine in China, published a long obituary, praising Yang, and discussing the pervasive impact of his writings.
