= Seizure of power (Cultural Revolution) =

Rebel-led series of events during the Cultural Revolution

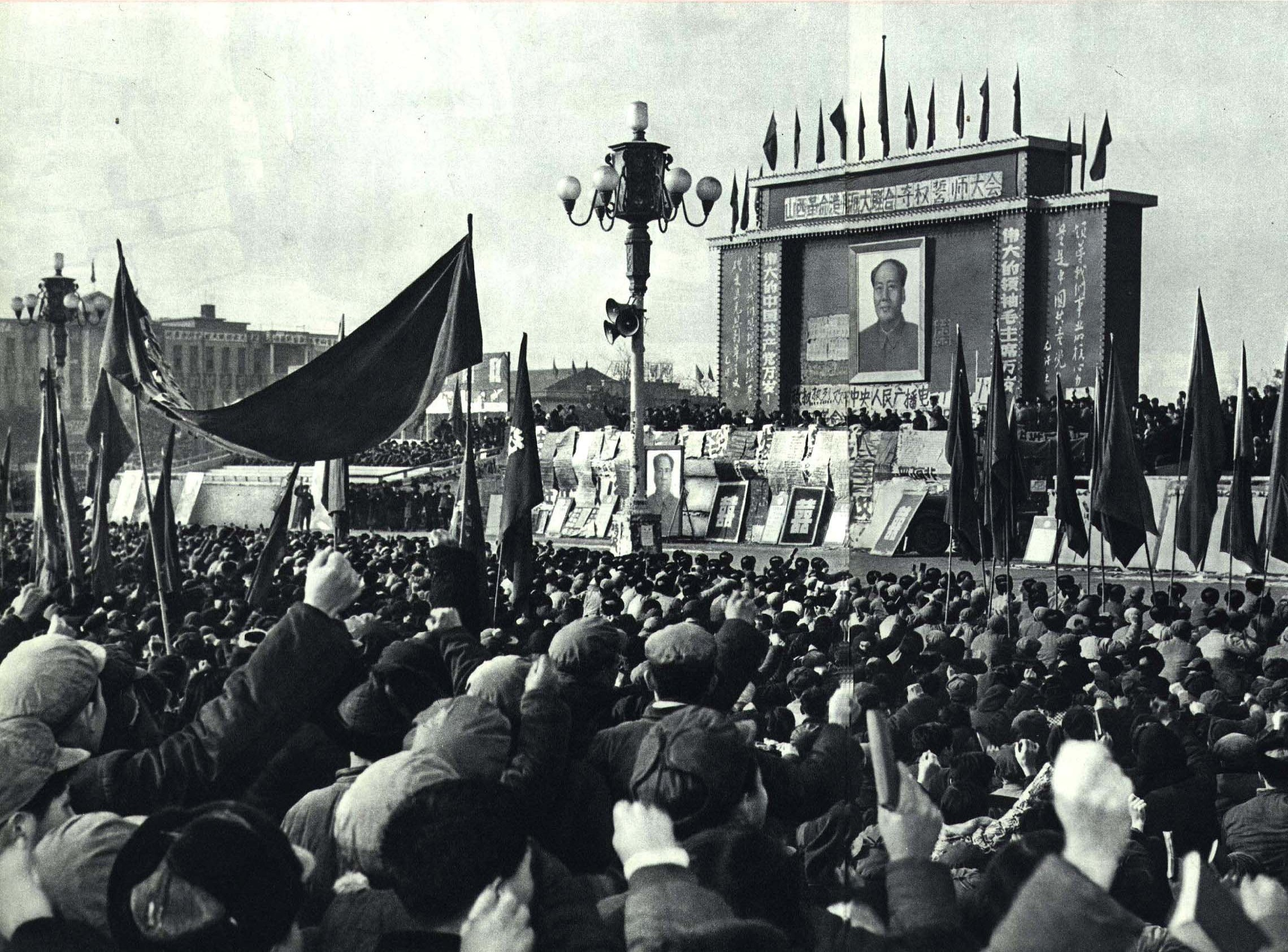
The rally of power-seizure movement in Shanxi, China (April 1967).

The seizure of power (simplified Chinese: 夺权; traditional Chinese: 奪權), or power-seizure movement (simplified Chinese: 夺权运动; traditional Chinese: 奪權運動) during the Cultural Revolution was a series of events led by the "rebel groups", attempting to grab power from the local governments in China and local branches of the Chinese Communist Party (CCP). The seizure of power began in the "January Storm" of Shanghai in 1967, and rapidly spread to other areas of China. The power seizure usually culminated in the establishment of local revolutionary committees, which replaced the original governments as well as communist party branches, and wielded enormous power that often caused much chaos in Chinese society.

== January Storm ==
Mao Zedong launched the Cultural Revolution in May 1966. In January 1967, the January Storm in Shanghai marked the beginning of power-seizure movement, which then spread to other areas of China. As China's most industrialized city, Shanghai's workforce consisted of both unskilled, poorer laborers and specialized or managerial workers. As the Cultural Revolution reached the city, ideological factions generally formed along these dividing lines, with laborers taking inspiration from Mao's August 1966 “Sixteen Articles” and thus explicitly setting themselves against those in local positions of authority within the CCP. Several labor-based rebel groups coalesced into the Workers’ General Headquarters (WGH), and were opposed by the Scarlet Guards, a conservative worker group formed just weeks after the WGH. These Scarlet Guards were composed of the more specialized class of workers, who were largely existing and future party cadres

Like the Red Guards in Beijing, the Scarlet Guards presented themselves as supporters of Maoist orthodoxy. However, their close ties to the established Shanghai Party Committee (SPC) set them against local and national rebel factions as they appealed to Mao's “Bombarding the Headquarters” rhetoric. The situation deteriorated after an outbreak of violence between the Scarlet Guards and the WGH at Shanghai party headquarters on December 30, 1966, leading members of both groups to leave their jobs to demonstrate and brawl in the streets.

Over the next week, WGH-aligned rebels seized administrative and party positions throughout the city, legitimized through Mao's endorsement of the radical Zhang Chunqiao as the movement's leader. Mao's recognition of the rebels’ actions as ideologically in line with his rhetoric shattered the Scarlet Guards, and signalled his approval for similar actions elsewhere. The SPC was reorganized into the autonomous Shanghai Commune, which was short-lived and unstable. Through the intervention of Mao, Shanghai's government was reorganized again into a more centralized revolutionary committee, the first of many. In the next three weeks, 24 more province-level governments were overthrown. Rebel groups across China, such as those in Shanxi, Heilongjiang, Guizhou and Shandong, started their own seizure of power as early as late January. The Cultural Revolution thereafter entered a new phase.

== Nature of seizures ==
Mao's decision to favor the radical over the more conservative faction in Shanghai served to publicly reinforce his “to rebel is justified” slogan. While this had the effect of inspiring many other provincial-level seizures in the same radical vein, mass movements were not the only origin of overthrows. Sociologist Andrew G. Walder writes that most power seizures resulted not from popular rebellions, but were instead "organized or unilaterally carried out by government functionaries who worked in party and government agencies." Seizures in large cities and at the provincial and prefectural levels tended to have high rebel participation, though never completely without the involvement of aligned cadres; in the countryside, cadres had greater freedom of action. Walder describes a pattern of unilateral action on the part of cadres in these cases, whether out of opportunism or in reaction to a perceived danger of overthrow from a rival cadre or rebel faction.

Following Mao's endorsement of radical factions, the radical-conservative binary generally broke down across the country, but disputes between rebel groups continued to provoke disorder in many provinces. In Nanjing, like Shanghai, violent disputes between conservative and rebel forces were resolved by Mao's intervention, and contentions regarding which rebel group should hold power became the main source of the continuing instability. After the Nanjing government had been seized by rebels at the encouragement of the central government, a split developed as “the rebels now realized that the Centre demanded absolute authority over power seizures.” Violence continued in the province as each competing group struggled to establish material and ideological authority, culminating in Beijing's decision to send in the PLA under orders to “support the left”, establishing temporary military rule in preparation for the CCP's preferred civilian government. This kind of conflict was more common at the provincial level than those between clear-cut radical and conservative factions.

== Revolutionary committees ==
The end product of the power seizures were the revolutionary committees, which were established to wield the power grabbed from local governments and communist party committees. The revolutionary committees possessed enormous power. Between January and March 1967, there was relatively little disagreement between the Party elite regarding the revolutionary committees approved following provincial power seizures. Mao and his radical allies viewed the revolutionary committees as victories, while pragmatists like Zhou Enlai welcomed the establishment of such committees as a restoration of order and end to economic disruptions.

To manage the perpetual factionalism which had characterized the initial phase of rebellion, the central government prescribed the revolutionary committees form “three-in-one” alliances first provincially, then at each lower administrative level. These alliances were so named for their appearance of accommodating the interests of the masses, the cadres, and the PLA, and were first implemented in provinces with the most rebel activity in order to stabilize them. In practice, Beijing sought influence as much as stability in the provinces, as by some accounts the central government had effectively ceased to wield control outside the capital from late 1966 to mid 1967.

The role of the PLA in resolving the provincial power struggles has been viewed in terms of the military, and Beijing by extension seeking practical rather than ideologically pure solutions to the widespread unrest in this period. In this view, the PLA rose to prominence in the revolutionary committees due to being the only organization able to restore order. As a result, they tended to side with the conservative factions, representing the established cadres with support from Beijing, over the radical factions, representing local rebels and mass organizations.

More recent scholarship has emphasized that the radical-conservative binary rapidly lost relevance after Mao's endorsement of the radical factions in early 1967, with subsequent conflicts occurring between radical groups over competing claims of legitimacy. PLA forces initially sent to Nanjing in January 1966 to support a particular rebel faction after a split were drawn into partisan politicking as the stance of Beijing remained vague. Each side courted the local PLA both as a means of control and as an indicator of the central government's support, leading to fissures even within the military until the direct intervention of Mao decided the issue. Jiangsu province remained under martial law until the conclusion of negotiations for the establishment of a revolutionary committee some months later.

The influence of individual rebels, officers, and cadres on how events in Nanjing occurred was substantial, and local factors were significant in the struggle between the largely similar radical factions, as was the case in every other province subject to power seizures in this period; generalizations about the compositions and motivations of the factions involved are therefore difficult.

After the Cultural Revolution, the revolutionary committees were gradually abandoned during the Boluan Fanzheng and "Reforms and Opening-up" period.

== Further analysis ==
Walder argues that while party cadres are generally portrayed as targets of a popular insurgency during the power seizures of the Cultural Revolution, cadres were themselves a major force in the national wave of power seizures. Walder writes, "The rebellion was a form of bureaucratic politics in a setting characterized by rapidly shifting signals and high uncertainty, in which rebels' motives were generated after the onset of the Cultural Revolution. In his view, "the collapse of civilian political authority in this vast political hierarchy was more an 'inside out' than a 'bottom up' process."

By 1969, the central government's proxy control of the revolutionary committees through the PLA domination had given way to a more direct control, transforming the ostensibly autonomous bodies into a centralized bureaucratic arm of the state.

== See also ==
- January Storm
- Revolutionary committee
- Six Articles of Public Security
- Violent Struggle
