= He Shu =

He Shu (Chinese: 何蜀; born 1948 in Chongqing) is a magazine editor and historian of the Chinese Cultural Revolution. Barred from entering high school in 1964 because of his father's "rightism", he ended up becoming a temporary contract laborer. In 1972, permanently employed as a worker in the Chongqing Steel Plant. In 1981, transferred to the Chongqing People's Broadcasting Station where he became an editorial assistant in the cultural and historical programs department. In May 1989, helped launch the Chongqing magazine Red Crag Spring and Autumn Annals （《红岩春秋》）of which he is (in 2009) deputy editor-in-chief.

He Shu has since 1989 published close to a hundred articles on various aspects of the history of the Cultural Revolution in the People's Republic of China, Hong Kong, and on the internet. In March 2006, he helped organize an unofficial conference of Chinese and foreign scholars and historians of the Cultural Revolution in a resort outside Beijing. In September 2008, together with Wu Di, he launched the electronic journal Remembrance (《记忆》), the only publication of its kind in China, devoted exclusively to publishing academic research on the Cultural Revolution.
