= February Countercurrent =

Opposition within the Chinese Communist Party to the beginning of the Cultural Revolution

- Part of the Cultural Revolution
- Date: 11 February 1967 – 18 February 1967 (1 week)
- Location: Huairen Hall
- Caused by: January Storm; High ranking party members feeling threatened by the Cultural Revolution
- Result: Cultural Revolution Group victory, party elders criticized and are made to conduct self-criticism

Parties
State Council	Cultural Revolution Group; Ministry of Public Security

Lead figures
Tan Zhenlin; Li Fuchun; Li Xiannian; Chen Yi; Ye Jianying; Xu Xiangqian; Nie Rongzhen	Kang Sheng; Chen Boda; Jiang Qing; Zhang Chunqiao; Xie Fuzhi

The February Countercurrent (Chinese: 二月逆流; pinyin: Èryuè nìliú), or the February Adverse Current, was a group within the Chinese Communist Party (CCP) that opposed the early direction of the Cultural Revolution, as led by the "radicals" of the Cultural Revolution Group (CRG). Following the January Revolution and similar power-seizures around the country, top Party leaders were meeting to discuss these events and the future course of the Cultural Revolution.The Countercurrent included senior party and People's Liberation Army officers (PLA) - the "old guard" - who protested the revolution's high-level purges and persecutions. In February 1967, arguments between the Countercurrent and the radicals led to the intervention of Mao Zedong who resolved the confrontation by supporting the CRG. The leaders of the Countercurrent were punished, but not purged; Mao wanted to prevent the "old guard" from uniting against him.

== Background ==
The CRG was created by the 16 May Notification in 1966 to write Cultural Revolution policy for the Politburo Standing Committee (PSC). In practice, it led the Cultural Revolution. The CRG reported directly to Mao, and its organization expanded to replace the Central Committee Secretariat. Jiang Qing, Mao's wife and a leading radical, was the CRG's deputy director from September 1966. The meetings were chaired by Premier Zhou Enlai.

The Cultural Revolution spread during 1966. The Red Guards waged a destructive campaign against the "Four Olds". University students persecuted faculty. Concerns over economic disruption were raised by the end of the year. In early January 1967, Red Guards broke into Zhongnanhai and persecuted senior party and PLA members and their families. That same month Mao made the state an acceptable target. The frequency of such persecutions increased.

The position of the PLA was unclear. It was required to support the revolution on ideological grounds, but also to oppose it to maintain order. In general, the PLA had been noninterventionist. By January 1967, military effectiveness was being impaired as the revolution spread into the organization and senior officers were being attacked. Marshal Lin Biao, the vice-chairman of the Central Military Commission and head of the PLA, sought to prevent the further erosion of his power base. In late-January, Lin persuaded Mao to allow the PLA to suppress the revolutionaries under limited circumstances to maintain order.

Mao was not entirely pleased with how the CRG operated. In December 1966 and January 1967, the radicals accused Tao Zhu - the head of the party's propaganda department - of holding the same views of other recently purged officials. Mao agreed to replace Tao at the end of January, but complained that the CRG had neither sought his input nor permission before attacking Tao. On February 10, Mao explicitly directed these criticisms against Jiang Qing and CRG director Chen Boda. Given Mao's often contradictory and mercurial behaviour, this clear indication of Mao's displeasure with senior radical leaders may have emboldened the Countercurrent to confront the radicals.

According to Chinese historians, the Countercurrent sought clarification from the CRG on the future composition of the country's leadership - and whether the existing leadership was to replaced wholesale - and its effects on the PLA.

== Events ==
The confrontations occurred during two meetings of the Central Caucus, an unofficial party body that handled routine political matters after August 1966 and whose creation increased the power of the radicals. It functioned - in membership and responsibilities - as an enlarged PSC and was chaired by Zhou Enlai. The agenda for the meetings was "grasping revolution and promoting production" but leadership issues were actually discussed. Jiang did not attend the meetings do to illness.

The first meeting was held on February 11 at Li Fuchun's home. The meeting became a "verbal brawl" between the CRG—represented by Chen Boda, Kang Sheng, and Wang Li—and the moderate faction of PLA marshals and vice premiers of the State Council. Marshals Ye Jianying - the day-to-day head of the PLA - and Xu Xiangqian accused the CRG of making a "mess" of the country, and trying to undermine the PLA ("a pillar of the dictatorship of the proletariat") by inciting radical insurgency against the troops.

The Central Caucus met again on February 16. Vice Premier Tan Zhenlin labelled the radicals as "reactionary" for rejecting the leadership of the party and for persecuting individuals based on their family (" reactionary blood lineage theory"). Marshal Chen Yi defended the revolutionary credentials of purged leadership members and accused the radicals of revisionism, comparing their ascension to power to the Soviet transition from Joseph Stalin to Nikita Khrushchev.

Zhou Enlai did not support the old guard during the meetings.

== Response ==
The radicals moved to control the narrative. In the evening of February 16, Zhang Chunqiao, Wang Li and Yao Wenyuan - on Jiang Qing's instructions - reported the meeting to Mao. According to Wang Li, Mao seemed unconcerned with events until coming to Chen Yi's comment; Mao found Chen's comments to be particularly offensive. On February 19, Mao told members of the Politburo that he supported the CRG, and ordered Tan Zhenlin, Chen Yi, and Xu Xiangqian to "request leave of absence to self-criticize." Kang Sheng later remarked that he had never seen Mao so angry. Tan Zhenlin, Chen Yi, and Xu Xiangqian underwent criticism sessions from late-February to mid-March, involving many of the Politburo members. Yu Qiuli, who held a post junior to others in the Countercurrent, was permitted to retain his position; he became a target of the Red Guards in Beijing and was subjected to struggle sessions.

== "Second" Adverse Current ==
In March 1968, Lin Biao and the Gang of Four accused Yang Chengwu, Yu Lijian (second secretary of the Party Committee of the Air Force), and Fu Chongbi (commander of the Beijing garrison) of "overturning the case of the February Countercurrent." This event became known as the "Yang, Yu, Fu Incident." Based on allegations later deemed by the Party to be false, the Gang of Four and their allies contended that Yang, Yu, and Fu had sought to seize power with respect to the air force and the Beijing garrison. Yang, Yu, and Fu were persecuted and some of their allies attacked and even killed.

At a plenum of the Central Committee in October 1968, Zhou Enlai and Lin Biao denounced the Countercurrent. Lin's denunciation was noticeably stronger than that of Zhou's. At the end of the plenum, Mao concluded in conciliation that - as party members - the Countercurrent had been correct to communicate their views and that they had been honest in doing so. As in February, Mao did not purge the Countercurrent's members and recommended that their election to the next party congress. According to MacFarquhar and Schoenhals, Mao effectively pardoned the convicted members of the Countercurrent to avoid alienating the old guard; Mao valued the old guard - and its members with long histories of loyalty and support to Mao - as a fall back position.

== Reassessment ==
The post-Mao CCP reversed the judgment of the February Countercurrent, particularly following the downfall of the Gang of Four. On November 25, 1978, Hua Guofeng announced at a meeting of the Standing Committee of the Politburo of the Central Committee that the Politburo would openly and thoroughly redress a number of historic matters, including the February Countercurrent.

In March 1979, the Central Committee issued a Notice of Open Rehabilitation and repudiated the allegations made by the Gang of Four during the "Yang, Yu, Fu Incident." The Central Committee resolved that the accusations were slanderous, officially restored the reputations of those targeted in the incident, and paid compensation for those who were injured or killed as a result.

== Sources ==
- MacFarquhar, Roderick; Schoenhals, Michael (2006). Mao's Last Revolution. Cambridge, MA: Harvard University Press. ISBN 978-0-674-02332-1.
