= Yilin-Dixi Incident =

The Yilin-Dixi Incident (Chinese: 伊林、涤西事件) is an event during the Cultural Revolution in which two students from the Affiliated High School of Beijing Agricultural University published an open letter titled "An Open Letter to Comrade Lin Biao," criticizing Lin Biao's cult of Mao Zedong and Maoism.

== Incident ==
In September 1966, Lin Biao made a public speech in Beijing, placing Mao Zedong and his ideology above any other Marxist thinker in history, including Karl Marx, Friedrich Engels, Vladimir Lenin, and Joseph Stalin, and he also stated in the speech that:

Bombard the headquarters means to bombard a handful of capitalist roaders. Our state is a socialist one under the proletarian dictatorship. The leadership in our country is in the hands of the proletariat. The purpose to struggle against capitalist roaders is to strengthen our proletarian dictatorship. Obviously, a handful of reactionary bourgeois, landlords, rich peasants, counter-revolutionaries, bad elements and rightists hate the dictatorship so that they attempt to bombard our proletarian headquarters in every possible way. We will brook no such activities.

On November 15, two students from the Affiliated High School of Beijing Agricultural University stepped forward to challenge Lin Biao. They posted a big-character poster at Tsinghua University accusing Lin Biao of distorting Mao Zedong's directive. These two high school students emphasized that the significance of "Bombard the Headquarters" did not lie in exposing the crimes of individual bureaucrats, and pointed out:

The problems that have been revealed in the brief course of the Cultural Revolution demonstrate that the proletarian dictatorship needs to be ameliorated, the socialist system needs to be reformed, and the forms of the Party and the government need to be amended. Founded seventeen years ago, the People's Republic based upon the principle of the people's democratic dictatorship has become obsolete. We must create a brand-new state machinery to replace the old one.

The two high school students insisted their stance was firmly grounded in Marxism and Maoism. They reminded Lin Biao that Mao Zedong had recently mentioned the model of the Paris Commune on multiple occasions. These two authors firmly believed that Mao Zedong's Cultural Revolution was steering the entire nation toward a new system free of bureaucracy, inequality, and manipulation. In their letter, they declared that "an Oriental Commune replacing [the People's Republic of] China is already on the horizon."

After Yilin Dixi's big-character poster was put up, it was torn down that very afternoon, denounced as "counterrevolutionary" and "poisonous weeds." Three days later, the two printed the open letter as pamphlets and continued distributing them. In November, another student, Li Hongshan from Beijing Forestry College, published multiple works attacking the Central Cultural Revolution Group.

In December, Kang Sheng stated at a symposium that "severely suppressing counterrevolutionary elements is the greatest form of democracy [...] Li Hongshan is a minor counterrevolutionary leader." That same month, Yilin, Dixi, and Li Hongshan were subjected to struggle sessions by rebels at Tsinghua University, Peking University, Beijing Institute of Geology, and other institutions, and were subsequently arrested by police and imprisoned. Following the Lin Biao incident, the two were released and exonerated.
