= January Storm =

Short coup d'état in Shanghai in 1967

- Part of the Cultural Revolution
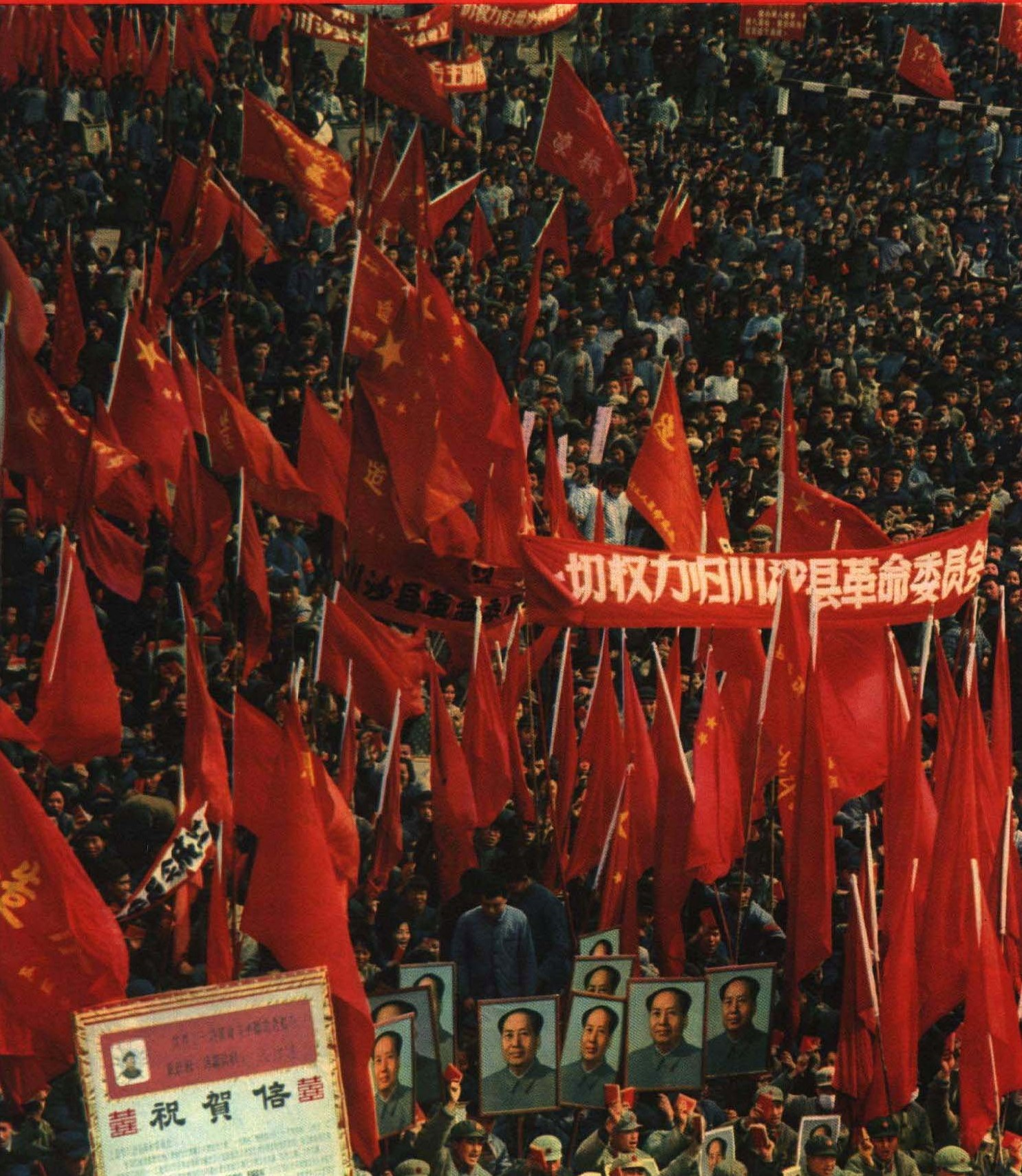
- The formation of the Chuansha County Revolutionary Committee at Shanghai, c. May 1967.
- Date: 5 January – 23 February 1967 (49 days)
- Location: Shanghai, China
- Caused by: Rising radicalism of the Cultural Revolution
- Goals: Seizure of political power in Shanghai
- Result: Coup successful: Shanghai Municipal Committee overthrown; formation of the Shanghai People's Commune; formation of the Chuansha County Revolutionary Committee circa. in May 1967; Increased intensity of seizure of powers and violent struggles; Outbreak of the February Countercurrent

Parties
Rebel Factions; Workers' Headquarters; Workers' Third Army; Workers' Eight Army; Workers' Second Regiment; Supported by: Central Committee; State Council; Central Military Commission; Cultural Revolution Group; Shanghai Garrison	Shanghai Municipal Committee; Shanghai People's Committee; East China Bureau of the Central Committee; Shanghai Municipal People's Congress; Supported by: People's Liberation Army; Dissenting rebels: Red Revolutionary Society; Shanghai Revolutionary Rebel Coalition Committee

Lead figures
Zhang Chunqiao; Yao Wenyuan; Wang Hongwen; Xu Jingxian; Geng Jinzhang; Supported by: Mao Zedong; Liao Zhengguo	Chen Pixian; Cao Diqiu; Wei Wenbo; Supported by: Ye Jianying; Tan Zhenlin; Chen Yi; No centralized leadership

January Storm
- Simplified Chinese: 一月风暴
- Traditional Chinese: 一月風暴
- Literal meaning: "January Storm"
Transcriptions
Standard Mandarin
- Hanyu Pinyin: Yī yuè fēngbào
- Wade–Giles: i^{1}-yüeh^{4}feng^{1}-bao^{4}
Yue: Cantonese
- Jyutping: jat^{1}-jyut^{6}fung^{1}-bou^{6}

Formal name
- Simplified Chinese: 一月革命
- Traditional Chinese: 一月革命
- Literal meaning: "January Revolution"
Transcriptions
Standard Mandarin
- Hanyu Pinyin: Yī yuè gémìng
- Wade–Giles: i^{1}-yüeh^{4}-ko^{2}-ming^{4}
Yue: Cantonese
- Jyutping: jat^{1}-jyut^{6}gaak^{3}-ming^{6}

The January Storm, formally known as the January Revolution, was a coup d'état in Shanghai that occurred between 5 January and 23 February 1967, during the Cultural Revolution. The coup, precipitated by the Sixteen Articles and unexpected local resistance towards Maoism in Shanghai, was launched by Maoist rebel factions against the city's party leadership under the directives of the Cultural Revolution Group (CRG) through Maoist leaders such as Zhang Chunqiao, Wang Hongwen and Yao Wenyuan, with backing from Mao Zedong, Kang Sheng, and Jiang Qing. The coup culminated in the overthrow of the Shanghai Municipal Committee of Chen Pixian, Wei Wenbo and Cao Diqiu, and led to the creation of the Shanghai People's Commune on 5 February 1967.

Modeled after the Paris Commune, the CRG leaders in Shanghai planned to introduce direct democracy for the city's new leadership, but the nature of its implementation generated severe opposition among the Chinese Communist Party (CCP)'s top echelons, who viewed it as a potential threat towards the Central Committee and State Council grip of power on China's domestic affairs. Meanwhile, the political instability from seizure of powers and rise of violence through violent struggles between rebel factions alarmed top generals of the People's Liberation Army, resulting in joint efforts by several CCP veterans to resist the radicalism of the Cultural Revolution in the February Countercurrent. Ultimately, the commune collapsed within 18 days after Mao Zedong retracted his support, and was reformed under a revolutionary committee jointly administered by a "triple alliance" of military personnel, revolutionary cadres, and the revolutionary masses.

Although the commune in Shanghai ended in failure, it was influential in inspiring rebel factions throughout China to form revolutionary committees of their own, which eventually started a series of seizure of powers that led to armed violent struggles nationwide throughout 1967, effectively marking a new and more violent stage in the Cultural Revolution.

== Background ==
On 16 May 1966, Mao Zedong, paramount leader of China, launched the Cultural Revolution through the 16 May Notification. At the end of 1966, it became evident that Mao and the Cultural Revolution Group (CRG) in Beijing had underestimated the ability of local party organizations to resist attacks from the Red Guards. While Maoist influence was strong around the capital, many regional party divisions resisted by merely paying lip service to Maoist teachings while countering attacks of local Maoists. To break the stalemate which had begun to form, Maoist leaders called for the "seizure of power by proletarian revolutionaries", a concept originally mentioned in the Sixteen Articles, an influential party statement of the aims of the Cultural Revolution approved by the Chinese Communist Party in August 1966.

In July 1966, Mao had bitterly complained on the massive size of the State Council of China and preferred power be concentrated within the Cultural Revolution Group. The Central Committee Secretariat along with the Party's 6 regional bureaus were been dissolved by early 1967, replaced by the CRG.

=== Rising radicalism and discontent against Shanghai's leadership ===
Throughout the 1960s, Shanghai was the most industrialized city in China and accounted for almost half of the country's industrial production. When the Cultural Revolution began in the summer of 1966, the city experienced the formation of Red Guard groups proclaiming their loyalty to Mao. The movement quickly became highly radicalised and factionalised with attacks on local bureaucratic authorities and government buildings, challenging the administration of Cao Diqiu, the Mayor of Shanghai, Chen Pixian, the head of the Shanghai Municipal Committee, and Wei Wenbo, the head of the Party's East China Bureau.

By autumn 1966, social unrest spread from institutions to factories. On 6 November, several rebel groups formed an alliance under the Headquarters of the Revolutionary Revolt of Shanghai Workers, led by Wang Hongwen, a textile worker and mid-level party functionary.

The formation of the Workers' Headquarters perplexed Shanghai's leadership; even Maoist leaders of the CRG did not take a clear position initially. The Shanghai bureaucracy under Chen and Cao opposed the group and declared it illegal, viewing the group as counterrevolutionary. Tensions escalated on 8 November 1966, when the Workers' Headquarters presented several demands to the Shanghai Municipal Committee that attempted to challenge the party's power. The committee refused, causing a three-day siege at Anting. The reaction from Beijing was one of caution. Their first response was to send a telegram drafted by Chen Boda, which urged them to back down and return to work. However, the telegram was shunned by the Workers' Headquarters in an unprecedented manner.

After the impasse, the CRG sent Zhang Chunqiao to address the situation in Shanghai. The CRG did not give Zhang a specific mandate on his mission. Upon his arrival in Shanghai on 11 November, Zhang performed a thorough investigation and thereafter accepted their demands. After intense negotiations, Zhang reached an agreement with the Workers' Headquarters by officially recognising the group's legitimacy while resolving their disputes through local conferences in Shanghai, rather than with the Beijing leadership. Zhang's response was praised by the CRG and Mao.

=== Dismantling party authority in Shanghai ===
Although the crisis at Anting was dismantled, tensions remained with the Shanghai leadership because the agreement negotiated by Zhang contradicted the city's position. Local party officials responded by establishing the Scarlet Guards, a "loyalist" group composed of skilled factory workers and technicians, aimed at opposing the Workers' Headquarters in favour of the legitimacy of local authorities. Further incidents occurred in December 1966, when the Workers' Headquarters accused the Shanghai Municipal People's Government of causing several controversial political incidents, which severely disrupted the city's social order.

The conflict between the Workers' Headquarters and Scarlet Guards reached a high point in the early morning of 30 December 1966, when a riot erupted between both groups in the Shanghai party headquarters at Kangping Road. The violent struggle, the first of its kind in Shanghai, injured 91 and led to over 300 arrests. By afternoon, a mission of ten thousand members of the Scarlet Guard left Shanghai for Beijing in an attempt to seek support from the Central Committee for negotiations to resolve the conflict. On 31 December, the Scarlet Guards launched a general strike amidst chaos, paralysing Shanghai's economy. In a last ditch attempt, the city's officials attempted unsuccessfully to raise wages and bonuses to quell the unrest. On the other hand, the mission to Beijing was intercepted by the Workers' Headquarters while travelling towards Kunshan, causing another riot which damaged the Shanghai–Nanjing railway. Even though party officials tried to call off the mission, six to seven thousand members continued and reached Beijing. After the incident at Kunshan, the group was dissolved and ceased to exist.

== History ==
=== Launch of coup ===
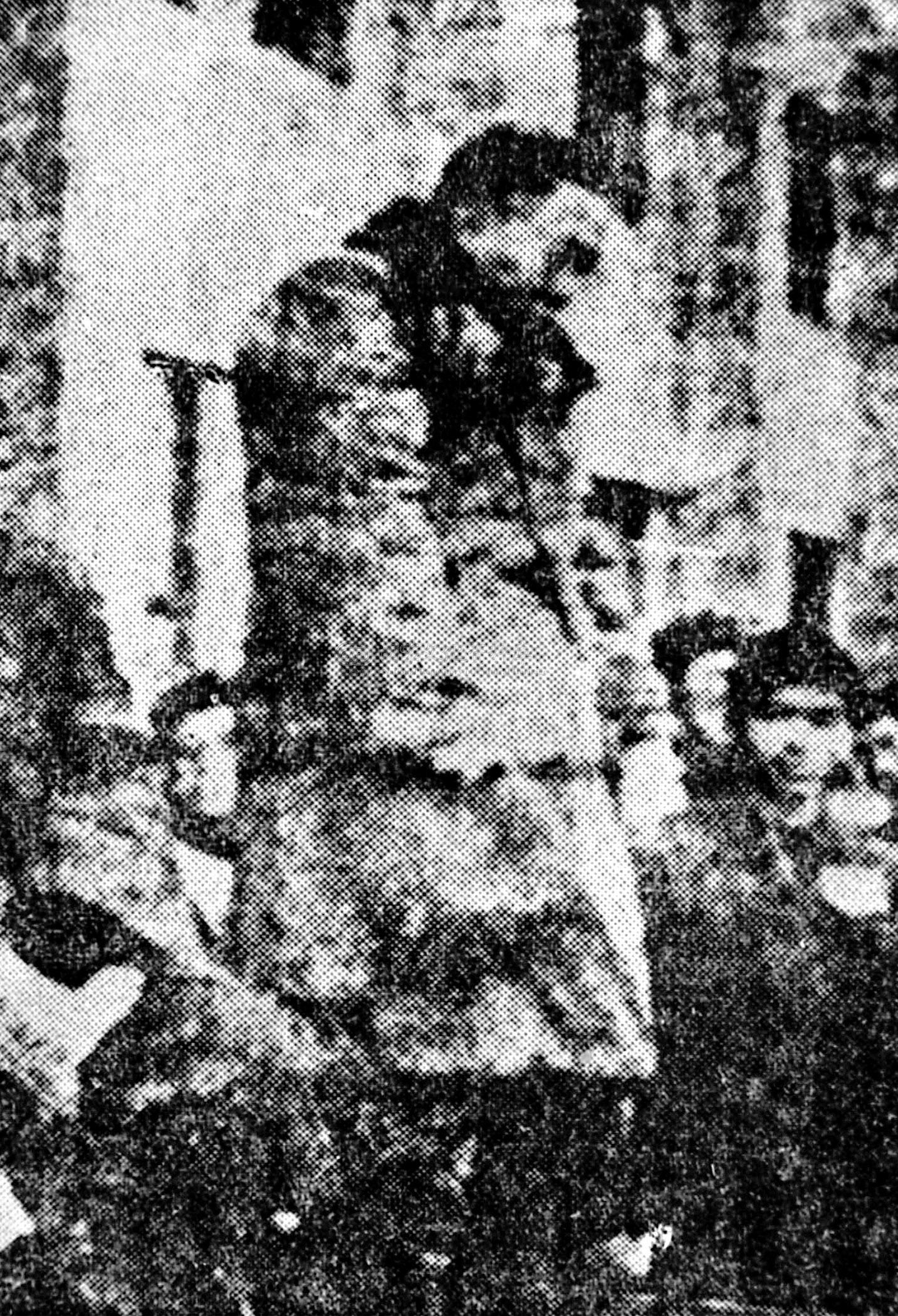
Chen Pixian condemned by the Red Guards in a struggle session at People's Square, 6 January 1967.

On 1 January 1967, the People's Daily published a New Year editorial drafted by Guan Feng and finalized by Mao which predicted that 1967 would be "a year of nationwide all-round class struggle", in which "the proletariat will join the revolutionary masses in a general offensive against the capitalist roaders and society's freaks and monsters." Zhou ordered Shanghai Party secretary Chen Pixian, then recovering from cancer, to get back to work to ensure Shanghai could on no account be allowed to descend into chaos. An urgent meeting was called by Chen, which issued an order to the Kunshan petitioners to withdraw and drafted a letter calling upon the people of Shanghai to "grasp revolution, promote production, and throughly smash the new attack by the bourgeois reactionary line".

On 4 January 1967, rebel factions seized control of Wenhui Daily. A coalition of twelve rebel factions under the Workers' Headquarters reprinted the letter drafted on 1 January and distributed across the city. Message to all the people of Shanghai appeared as the front-page article of the same newspaper the next day. On 5 January, rebels seized control of Jiefang Daily. The next day, 32 rebel factions under the leadership of the Workers' Headquarters initiated a struggle session aimed at "overthrowing the Shanghai Municipal Committee". Those condemned and humiliated in the session included hundreds of bureaucrats involved within the party's East China bureau, the Shanghai Municipal Committee, and the Shanghai People's Committee, notably against Chen Pixian, Cao Diqiu, and Wei Wenbo. The struggle session, witnessed by a million people, passed three resolutions:

1. Cao Diqiu is dismissed as the mayor of Shanghai;
2. Chen Pixian must explain his "anti-revolutionary crimes", and;
3. The Central Committee must reshuffle the Shanghai Municipal Committee.

After the meeting, all party leaders were dismissed from their positions, while the administrative powers of the committee and the People's Committee were terminated. This struggle session is seen as the start of the coup d'état. On 7 January 1967, rebel factions took control of Shanghai Radio and Television. On 8 January, Zhang and Yao ordered the creation of the Shanghai Revolutionary Production Line Headquarters. The pair then created the Committee on Protecting the Cultural Revolution as the city's de facto judicial body. Later that day, rebel factions agreed to draft an Urgent Notice for the city, which was published in Wenhui Daily on 9 January under the agreement of Chen Pixian.

=== Mao proclaims support ===
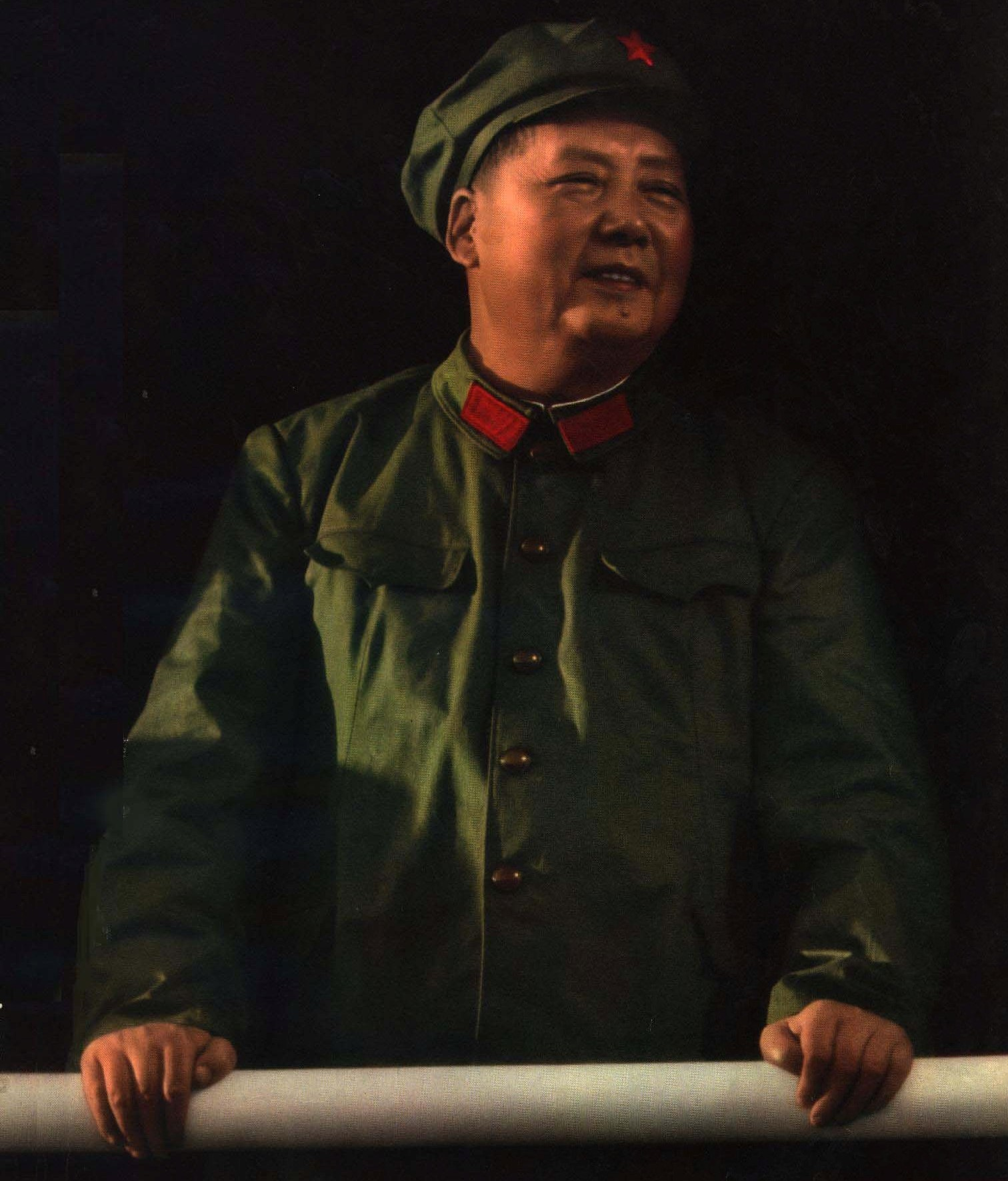
Mao Zedong, March 1967.

On 8 January 1967, during a conversation with members of the CRG, Mao Zedong declared his support of the Shanghai rebel's actions. He stated that the events showed "a class overthrowing another class, [that] it is a great revolution", and stated that "[rebels] seizing powers of two newspapers is a national issue. We must support their seizure." He believed the "revolution" in Shanghai provided "hope" for China, in that the events would not just influence East China but nationwide. Under the instructions of Mao, the CRG represented the Central Committee and the State Council in penning the congratulatory letters hailing all "revolutionary rebel factions" in Shanghai, and urged other revolutionaries in China to follow the Shanghai rebel's actions.

On 9 January 1967, the People's Daily published an editorial supervised by Mao, which stated that "the CRG represents the wave of the great red flag towards the Great Cultural Revolution of Chairman Mao", and "blows the signal of the continuing offensive against the capitalist roaders". On 11 January, under the direction of Mao, the Central Committee, State Council, Central Military Commission, and CRG issued a joint-statement congratulating the Shanghai rebel factions and added that the "series of revolutionary acts have become a model to follow for all workers, all people, and all revolutionaries." The statement was published in People's Daily the next day.

On 16 January, the party journal Red Flag published Proletarian Revolutionaries, Unite, an editorial approved by Mao. The article stated, "The working class of Shanghai...have seized power from the small party faction of capitalist roaders". For the first time, Mao urged revolutionaries to seize local power for the Central Committee. Seizure of power became legitimised under the leadership.

=== Creation of the Shanghai commune and faction infighting ===
Shanghai People's Commune 上海人民公社
- People's commune of China
- 1967
- Location of Shanghai in China
- Government: Revolutionary committee
  - Type: People's commune
- Chairman
  - 1967: Zhang Chunqiao
- Historical era: Cultural Revolution
  - Established: 9 January 1967
  - Proclaimed: 5 February 1967
  - Disestablished: 23 February 1967

On 19 January 1967, Zhang Chunqiao arrived at Shanghai and met several leaders of local rebel factions. On the same day, all rebel factions would open a meeting at the Shanghai Communist Party School, and proposed seizing power at the city to form a people's commune modeled after the Paris Commune. They named their coup d'état as the "January Revolution", intended to resonate with the similarly termed October Revolution, which received approval from members of the Gang of Four.

After discussions, it was agreed that the body was to be named as the "New Shanghai People's Commune". Thirty-two major rebel factions were tasked to draft a proclamation, which was titled All hail the January Revolution – The proclamation of the New Shanghai People's Commune. On 22 January, People's Daily published an editorial titled Proletarian Revolutionaries, Form a Great Alliance to Seize Power from Those in Authority Who are Taking the Capitalist Road! The article described the January Revolution as a "revolutionary storm". Even though Maoists rebel factions under the CRG and Workers' Headquarters were in a minority, the group had the backing of the central leadership in Beijing. After 23 January, the central leadership ordered local units of the People's Liberation Army to support the Maoist cause, thus the Shanghai Garrison under its commander Liang Zhengguo was compelled to provide assistance.

Despite the uniform stance of rebel factions during the toppling of the Shanghai bureaucracy, following the coup, a power vacuum had formed as no party had agreed on a united authority. Radical groups like the Workers' Second Regiment criticised this new commune as one imposed from Beijing rather than self-determined by the workers. Violence again broke out in between workers groups in the city and lasted through February 1967. Throughout this period, there were several coup attempts made by other organisations, but they were suppressed by Zhang's forces.

As early as 10 January, the headquarters of the Eighth Rebel Workers Army (Workers' Eighth Army) occupied the Shanghai party headquarters, declaring they had assumed control of the city. By 15 January, the headquarters of the Shanghai Third Red Guard Revolutionary Rebel Faction Army (Workers' Third Army) and the Workers' Headquarters Second Regiment declared a coup, announcing that they would assume control of the Shanghai Municipal Committee and the East China Bureau. Both factions sent a telegram to the Central Committee demanding that Zhang Chunqiao and Yao Wenyuan be appointed as the mayor and deputy mayor of Shanghai, although Zhang did not endorse the attempt.

On the morning of 22 January 1967, the Workers' Third Army declared a new coup by taking control of the municipal committee, claiming to have received support from fifty rebel groups. On the night of 24 January, the Shanghai Vocational Schools Red Guards Revolutionary Committee (Red Revolutionary Society), whom had been a staunch ally of the Workers' Headquarters, declared a countercoup by claiming support from 23 rebel factions. Between 28 and 30 January, the Red Revolutionary Society initiated the 28 January Anti-Zhang Chunqiao Campaign, which resulted in violent struggles; On the morning of 30 January, the CRG issued an emergency telegram to the Red Revolutionary Society, condemning the Red Revolutionary Society's actions and halting the campaign. After this incident, the rebel group was dissolved. On 2 February, members from the Workers' Second Regiment declared the formation of the Shanghai Revolutionary Rebel Coalition Committee, which announced another minor countercoup, but did not succeed.

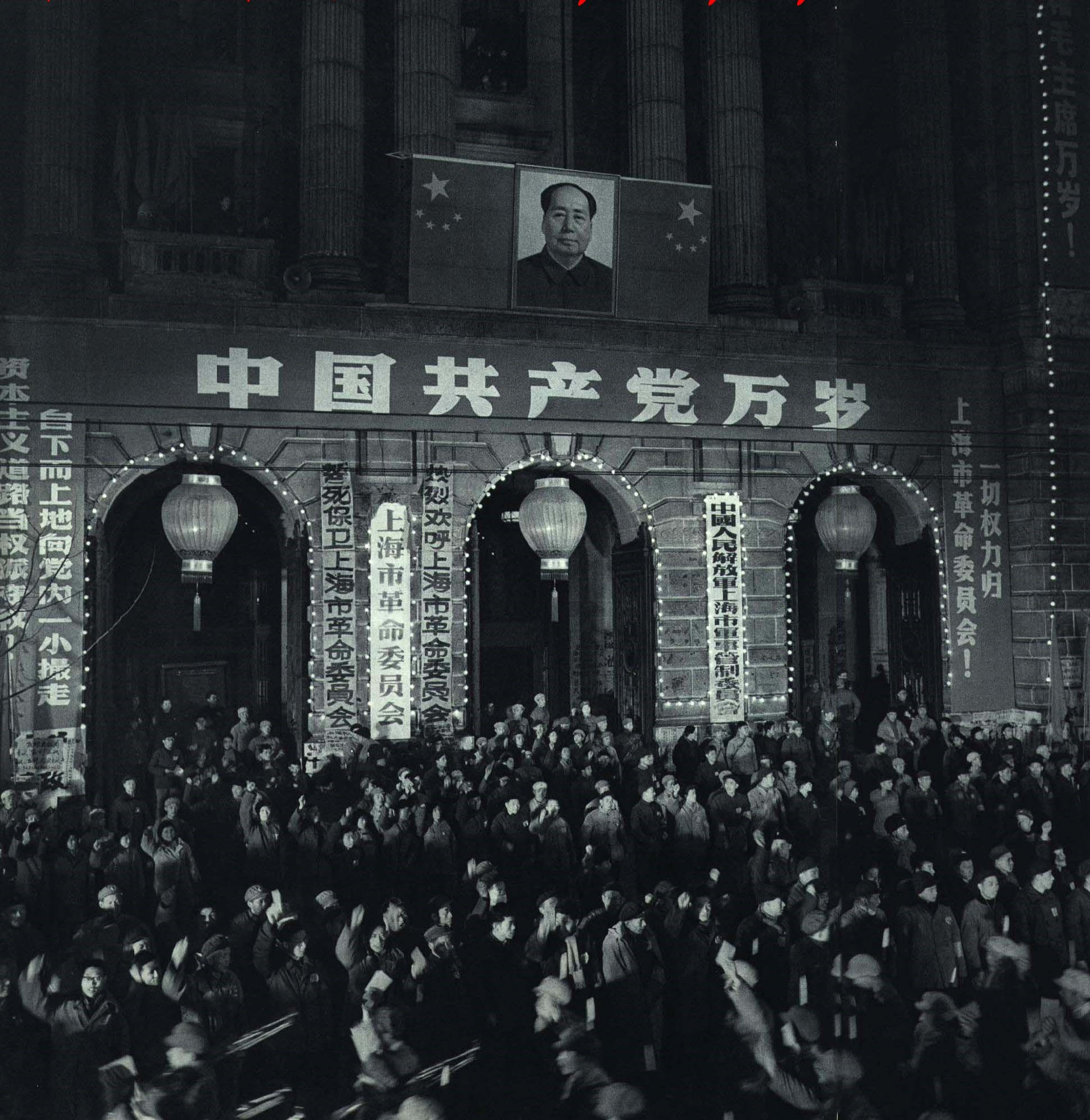
On 23 February 1967, the Shanghai People's Commune was renamed as the Shanghai Revolutionary Committee.

Following the coup's success, Mao Zedong recommended that the people's commune in Shanghai be renamed as the "Shanghai Commune". After receiving a telephone call from Wang Li, Zhang ordered the rebel factions to rename the local authority as the "Shanghai People's Commune", receiving approval from his superiors. On 5 February, the Shanghai People's Commune was formally established. In his inaugural speech, Zhang hailed the formation of the commune "as the collapse of the totalitarian capitalist rule of the municipal committee and people's committee" and the "seizure of power of the revolutionary proletariat of Shanghai."

Controversy once again ensued over the declaration. While finalising the Proclamation, the thirty-two major rebel factions responsible for its drafting had disputes over the order of signatures, with most organisations attempting to put their names on top of the signatories. Furthermore, when news of the commune's founding was publicly announced, over six hundred independent rebel factions fought to join the commune's newly created regime. Zhang compromised with the rebel factions by promising the creation of a temporary "triple alliance" administrative authority, composed of military personnel, revolutionary cadres, and the revolutionary masses of the thirty-two major rebel factions.

=== Mao retracts support and collapse of commune ===
你们这摊子有错误。所有省市都叫人民公社，那全国就叫中华人民公社啦，也不要中央、国务院了。[This is a mistake. Once all the provincial cities are called people's communes, why not just call our country the People's Commune of China, and ditch the Central Committee and State Council?]

— Mao Zedong in a private meeting, 6 February 1967

The proclamation stated that leadership of the commune was to be selected through democratic elections similarly employed in the Paris Commune; while a revolutionary committee was to be appointed as a transitional authority. In a meeting on the afternoon of 6 February with Zhou Enlai, Chen Boda, Jiang Qing and Ye Jianying, Mao in turn criticised the Shanghai proclamation, calling it a "mistake". He refuted the proclamation's contents and feared that its implementation would reduce the Party Central Committee and State Council's influence and role in domestic affairs. He also ordered all newspapers to prevent the commune from publishing the proclamation. While a telegram sent by the commune's leadership to Beijing stated that the hostile takeover was inspired by Mao's campaign, Mao was publicly silent on the events in Shanghai. Subsequently, the Xinhua News Agency and People's Daily were muted on developments in Shanghai, in contrast to the latter's extensive coverage of the establishment of the people's commune in Heilongjiang.

Between 12 and 18 February 1967, Zhang Chunqiao and Yao Wenyuan returned to Beijing. In their consultations with Mao, Mao backtracked on his suggestion of calling the city government a "commune", stating that such a body is not compatible with the party as the Party's authority should be paramount. Zhang and Yao would return to Shanghai to relay Mao's instructions.

On 23 February, the Shanghai People's Commune was reformed as the Shanghai Revolutionary Committee. The original transitional revolutionary committee remained, while the system of direct democracy modeled after the Paris Commune was abandoned. Zhang was appointed as the committee's director, while Yao, Wang Hongwen, and Xu Jingxian were appointed as deputy directors. Information of this change was made public in a televised address by Zhang on 24 February 1967, who was forced to explain the reasons for the withdrawal after the views of Mao's support towards the founding of the commune and its Marxist leadership were widely publicized. This address marked the collapse of the commune after only 18 days in existence.

== Aftermath ==
=== Start of seizure of powers ===
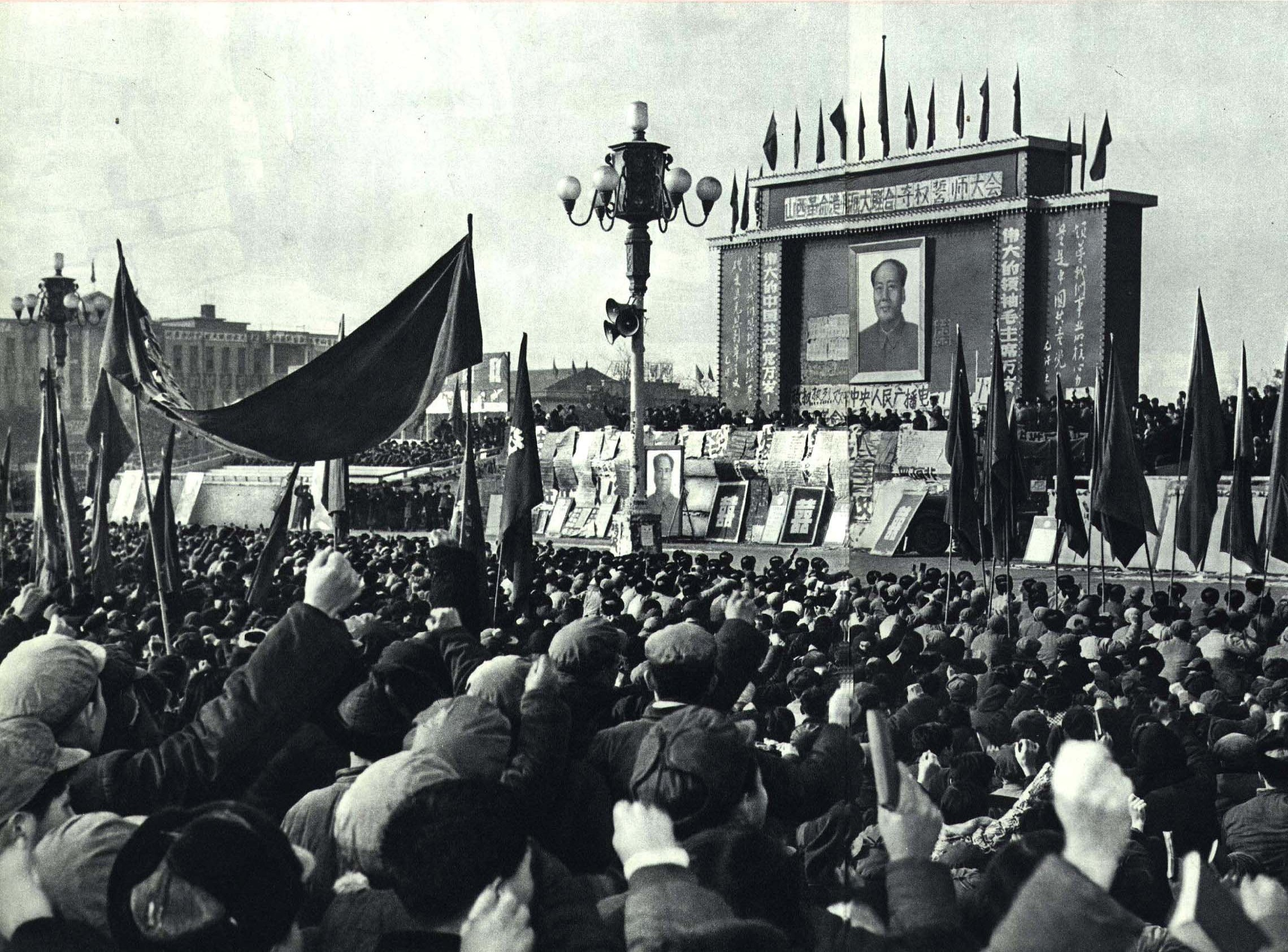
Shanxi rebel factions organising a seizure of power ceremony, c. April 1967.

After the outbreak of the January Storm, it created a ripple effect throughout China, causing a series of revolutions and seizures of power in several provinces, such as in Shanxi, Shaanxi, Guizhou, Heilongjiang, and Shandong. Revolutionary committees sprung up after violent seizure of powers, while rebel factions gained a foothold within the country's politics. From now on, the Cultural Revolution would take a new and more violent stage.

=== Violent struggles between rebel factions ===
During the coup, several rebel factions under the leadership of the Revolutionary Red Society initiated anti-Zhang protests throughout Shanghai, which was met with violent struggles with different rebel factions. He Shu opined that the events in Shanghai did not result in a successful seizure of power as intended by the CRG, instead it backfired by generating infighting within the CCP through factional attacks on the CRG.

Influenced by the events in Shanghai, coup attempts occurred in numerous regions across China, but due to power struggles among different rebel factions, violent struggles became common. During the January Storm, factional conflicts increased in intensity as rebel factions began to attack soldiers and arsenals, who opposed the "capitalist roaders" within the PLA, seizing weapons and creating militias, with some regions declared under military administration due to the inflamed violence. On 6 June 1967, the Central Committee, State Council, CMC and CRG issued the June 6 Order in an attempt to halt violence within the Cultural Revolution. However, by summer, with the endorsement of Jiang Qing, nationwide violence escalated. In July, rebel factions in Shanghai engaged in armed shootouts, resulting in 25 deaths by September 1967.

Following the events in January 1967, the Workers' Headquarters began to experience a factional split. A power struggle occurred between the central leadership of the organisation under Wang Hongwen and the lumpenproletariat, notably the Workers' Second Regiment under Geng Jinzhang, which threatened urban warfare in Nanshi. During alleged peace talks, Geng was ambushed and imprisoned for over two months by Wang's forces, which resulted in the dissolution of the Workers' Second Regiment. Zhang's loyalty towards the party was also in question among the Central Committee. In late-March, Zhang had gone absent in two major conferences which was attended by top party officials such as Lin Biao, Zhou Enlai, and Mao Zedong. This absence spiraled into accusations of treachery, which was published in an article titled Ten Reasons in Wenhui Daily on 12 April 1967. On 20 April, a second Anti-Zhang Chunqiao Campaign was initiated in Shanghai, with a turnout well exceeding the first held by the Red Revolutionary Society.

In the months following the events in Shanghai, the nationwide political climate changed rapidly. Most independent rebel factions weakened and collapsed from constant conflict. In almost every city and work unit, rebel factions would combine into two rival factions only. As time went on, the head-on clashes between rival factions became increasingly formalist and lacking in political content. Between 1968 and 1976, a million skilled workers from Shanghai were sent to rural underdeveloped areas in Inner China to share their "revolutionary experiences" and to assist in national development. Some radical leaders who had opposed the January Revolution were publicly executed in April 1968.

=== Military opposition towards the coup ===
你们把党搞乱了，把政府搞乱了，把工厂、农村搞乱了，你们还嫌不够，还一定要把军队搞乱。这样搞，你们想干什么？[You people [CRG] have messed up the party, messed up the government, messed up the factories and villages, and yet you think its not enough, and now you tried to mess up the army. What are you trying to gain from this?]

— Ye Jianying, Zhongnanhai, 11 February 1967
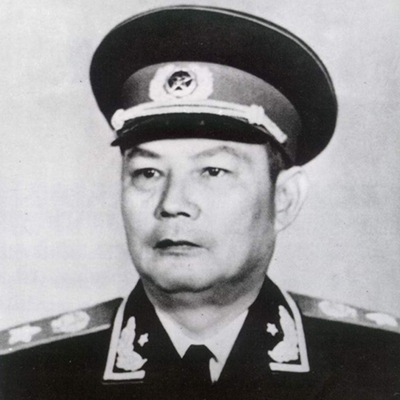
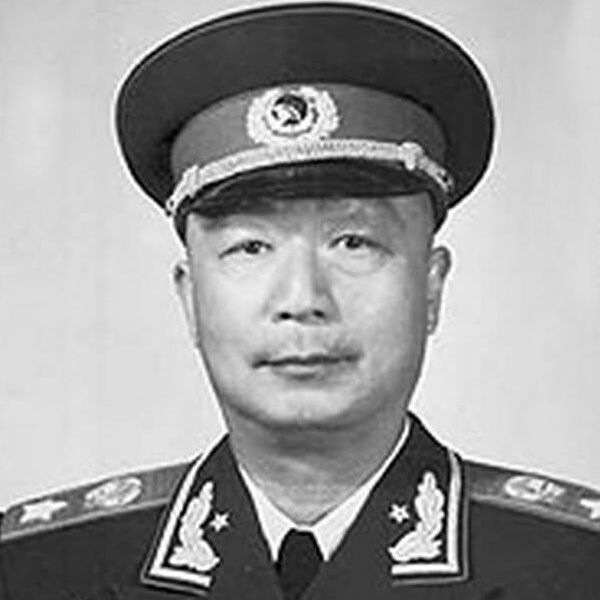
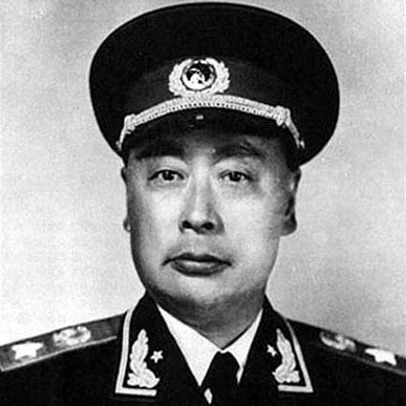
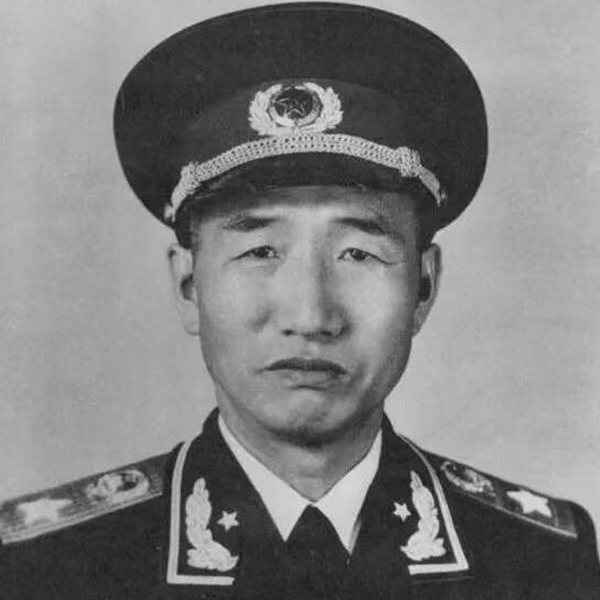
The four marshals of the Three Olds and Four Marshals that opposed the Cultural Revolution.

Clockwise from top-left:

- Ye Jianying, 1897–1986
- Nie Rongzhen, 1899–1992
- Xu Xiangqian, 1901–1990
- Chen Yi, 1901–1972

As the chaotic events unfolded, the People's Liberation Army (PLA) was increasing in a bind. On one hand, it had to maintain security and some semblance of law and order; on the other hand, it had played a crucial role in the rebels' early seizure of power. The PLA' behavior became the most powerful factor in shaping the course of the Cultural Revolution and increasing sucked into the political maelstrom, as they began to come under attack by the CRG and other radicals, as they desired to expand their influence within the PLA.

On 11 February 1967, during a Politburo meeting at Zhongnanhai, seven top generals in the PLA, Ye Jianying, Nie Rongzhen, Chen Yi, Xu Xiangqian, Tan Zhenlin, Li Xiannian, and Li Fuchun, collectively nicknamed as the Three Olds and Four Marshals expressed their dissatisfaction on the events in the Cultural Revolution, blaming the CRG for promoting revolutionary behaviour among soldiers, creating instabilities within the army. In a confrontation at Huairen Hall, Ye condemned the CRG's actions in the presence of Kang Sheng, Chen Boda and Zhang Chunqiao, questioning the motives of the CRG that had shrugged the Politburo's power.

A separate confrontation on the afternoon of 16 February in Zhongnanhai escalated the conflict between the politicians. When a request by Tan Zhenlin to reverse Chen Pixian's dismissal was ignored by Zhang Chunqiao, Tan furiously slammed Zhang for attempting to "eradicate the old party elements". On that night, Zhang, Wang Li, and Yao Wenyuan organised the statements made by the generals in the meeting, and under the arrangements of Jiang Qing and Kang Sheng, were sent to Mao for briefing on the morning of 17 February. On the night of 18 February, Mao chaired a Politburo meeting with other top leaders to express his support for the Cultural Revolution. He angrily criticised the seven generals for their remarks, stating that "if someone opposes the CRG I will resolutely oppose him!" Mao also threatened that "if the Cultural Revolution fails, I will personally leave Beijing with him (Lin Biao), and we will fight a guerilla war on the Jinggang Mountains." He even taunted Chen Yi, stating that he and Tan Zhenlin that they could return the exiled Wang Ming and Zhang Guotao to the party, and said, "if we're still adamant that we're weak, why not let us ask the United States and Soviet Union to come along?"

Mao ordered investigations to be made on Tan, Chen and Xu. He declared that the group was merely expressing its views, but required the three generals to conduct self-criticisms." From 22 February to 18 March 1967, the Central Committee conducted seven meetings evaluating the generals, with Jiang, Kang and Chen Boda labeling this particular opposition as the February Countercurrent. The generals were also denounced by Lin Biao as a "serious anti-party act". Afterwards, the Politburo would be suspended, with the CRG assuming its powers, becoming China's top decision making authority. Ye Jianying would be influential in executing the Huairen Hall coup in October 1976 after Mao Zedong's death, which led to the dissolution of the CRG and the downfall of the Gang of Four.

== Evaluation ==
=== Consolidation of power and the "triple alliance" model ===
The Sixteen Articles of August 1966, an influential enactment which dictated Mao Zedong's leadership in the Cultural Revolution, included requirements of direct elections in the country for the creation of the CRG and related committees such as those in the Paris Commune. However, the decision by Mao Zedong in early-February 1967 to enact a "triple alliance" administrative model for the newly reformed-Shanghai Revolutionary Committee represented a complete deviation from the CRG's initial interpretations of the principles as dictated by the Sixteen Articles. Maurice Meisner wrote that the events in February 1967 "revealed that all political power in China ultimately resided in, and attributed to, one man (Mao Zedong) and his 'thought'," and that "the cult of Mao Zedong had now become all-persuasive that the Chairman could decide not only the fate of individuals but the destiny of social movements." Meisner concluded that the revolution in Shanghai effectively warned the proletariat that the "right to rebel" as encouraged in the Cultural Revolution, was "not a right inherent in the people but one granted them by the authority of the deified Mao."

No democratic elections of any kind were held in Shanghai as of 1970; the SRC's leadership was instead appointed and approved only by the Central Committee. Although Mao denied universal suffrage in Shanghai, in other regions in China, the "triple alliance" model had indeed accommodated local elections. In spite of this, these electoral results proved to be heavily disadvantaged against the rebel factions and pro-CRG politicians, as conservative CCP politicians won landslide victories, such as in the Tianjin revolutionary committee elections of 23 March 1967. These events served to strengthen Mao and the CRG's distaste on direct elections in subsequent years.

=== Interpretation of the coup in China and reassessment ===
During the Cultural Revolution, propaganda magazines such as Red Flag portrayed the January Storm as the starting point for seizures of power throughout the country in 1967. In a political report from the 9th National Congress in April 1969, the overthrown bureaucrats of the Shanghai Municipal Committee and Shanghai People's Committee were described as capitalist roaders whose power "had been seized under the leadership and support of Chairman Mao and the headquarters of the proletariat".

However, reassessments of the coup after the end of the Cultural Revolution were negative, as the event became a typical example of politicking from the disgraced Gang of Four. CCP-sanctioned historian Jin Chunming wrote in 1988 that the January Storm was a proxy used by the Gang of Four to consolidate inner-party power. He wrote that the events in Shanghai "is not a revolutionary storm, but an anti-revolutionary countercurrent", and that the chaos resulted from the coup d'état was used advantageously by "a small group of nefarious individuals...to control the party's power". He Shu, on the other hand, argued that the actual importance of the coup was overblown by Mao, who "did not cared for the rebel factions who seized local political power in other provincial cities, but had sole affection towards the workers rebel factions in Shanghai who took the credit". Official histories published by the CCP described the January Storm as an event approved by the government that was "uncontrollable" and ended in "complete chaos" as "[the revolution] that is 'against anything'... causing uncountable conflicts, even leading to deadly armed struggles".

== Cultural adaptations ==
- January Revolution, documentary shot by Tianma Studios, January 1967.
- January Storm, a play written by the Shanghai Theatrical Society, 1967.
- January Storm, a 16-page periodical published by the editing department of the Gong Zongsi, June 1967.
- A grand festival, movie directed by Xie Jin, 1976; movie remains unfinished due to the downfall and arrest of the Gang of Four.

== See also ==
- February Countercurrent
- Revolutionary committee
- Violent struggle
- October Revolution
- Paris Commune
