= Cleansing the Class Ranks =

Movement in China during the Cultural Revolution

Cleansing the Class Ranks (Chinese: 清理阶级队伍, Pinyin: Qīnglǐ jiējí duìwǔ), or Cleansing of Class Ranks Campaigns, was a Maoist campaign during China's Cultural Revolution. The primary purpose of the movement was to eliminate "class enemies who have sneaked into the revolutionary organization", namely "traitors, spies, capitalist roaders, counter-revolutionaries and members of the Five Black Categories". The campaign particularly targeted purported supporters of Liu Shaoqi, who were referred to as "stubborn bourgeois power holders".

On May 13, 1968, Yao Wenyuan submitted a document ("《北京新华印刷厂军管会发动群众开展对敌斗争的经验》", The experience of the Military Management Committee of Beijing Xinhua Printing Factory in mobilizing the masses to carry out the struggle against the enemy) to Mao Zedong, in which Yao wrote "this document summarizes some of the policies in cleansing the class ranks". On May 19, Mao commented on the document, "Wenyuan: I suggest nationwide circulation and publication of this document; it is the best-written piece among all relevant files I have seen." As a result, the Cleansing the Class Ranks campaign was launched on May 25, 1968.

The campaign targeted many rebels from the earlier populist phase of the Cultural Revolution. They were not ideologically homogeneous, as well as being staffed by many people who turned out to be incompetent or opportunistic, and so attracted the hostility of Jiang Qing and others in her radical faction who drove forward the Cleansing the Class Ranks campaign.

Systematic torture, trial by suspicion, conviction by forced confessions, massacres and other forms of mass killings all took place during the Cleansing. Around 30 million people are estimated to have been persecuted, with an estimated death toll of 0.5-1.5 million. After the Cultural Revolution, the Chinese Communist Party as well as the Chinese government admitted that many of the cases in the Cleansing movement were "unjust, false, mistaken" cases.

== See also ==
- Cultural Revolution
- List of campaigns of the Chinese Communist Party
- Great Purge
- Inner Mongolia incident
