= Six Articles of Public Security =

The Six Articles of Public Security (Chinese: 公安六条), more formally known as the Regulations on Strengthening Public Security Work in the Great Proletarian Cultural Revolution (Chinese: 关于无产阶级文化大革命中加强公安工作的若干规定), was a directive promulgated on January 13, 1967, by the Central Committee of the Chinese Communist Party and the State Council of the People's Republic of China. Its six points directed state and Party organisations to take steps to punish counterrevolutionaries, strengthen the dictatorship of the proletariat and defined categories of "bad members of society". It was one of the main formal justifications for the mass persecution of millions of people in the Cultural Revolution. In 1979, the Central Committee cancelled it after the directive had been blamed for the large numbers of unjust punishments and false accusations that accompanied the Cultural Revolution.

== The six articles ==
The directive is subdivided into six points, from which it takes its name. The points are:

1) Punishment shall be carried out according to the law for counterrevolutionary elements who commit murder, arson, poisoning or looting, secretly carry out assassinations through staged traffic accidents, or make open attacks on prisons or institutions where criminals are kept, or who have illicit relations with foreign countries, steal state secrets, and engage in destructive activities.

2) Punishment shall be carried out according to the law for those who attack and slander the great leader Chairman Mao and his close comrade-in-arms, Lin Biao, by mailing out counter-revolutionary anonymous letters, overtly or covertly posting and disseminating counter-revolutionary pamphlets, and writing and shouting reactionary slogans.

3) The revolutionary masses and revolutionary mass organizations shall be protected. Leftists shall be protected. Fighting is strictly prohibited. Punishment shall be carried out to those who are the principal culprits in, who are heavily involved in, or who conspire behind the beating up of the revolutionary masses.

4) Landlords, rich peasants, counter-revolutionaries and rightists are not permitted to participate in the great exchange of revolutionary experience, sneak into revolutionary organizations, or establish their own organizations.

5) Disseminating reactionary statements under the guise of greater democracy or other means is prohibited.

6) Punishment shall be carried out against party, state, military, and public security officials who violate the stipulations above or suppress the revolutionary masses on fabricated charges.

== Impact ==
The Six Articles gained notoriety for their use in the Cultural Revolution to persecute millions on bogus charges of opposing Mao or other counter-revolutionary activity, or simply of being the wrong class. They were used by the radical Party faction led by the Gang of Four to punish dissidents and anyone else considered an enemy. Following the fall of the Gang of Four, the Central Committee annulled the document on 17 February 1979 and charged the Gang and former Minister of Security Xie Fuzhi with a variety of crimes.
