= Revolutionary committee (China) =

Government body established during the Chinese Cultural Revolution

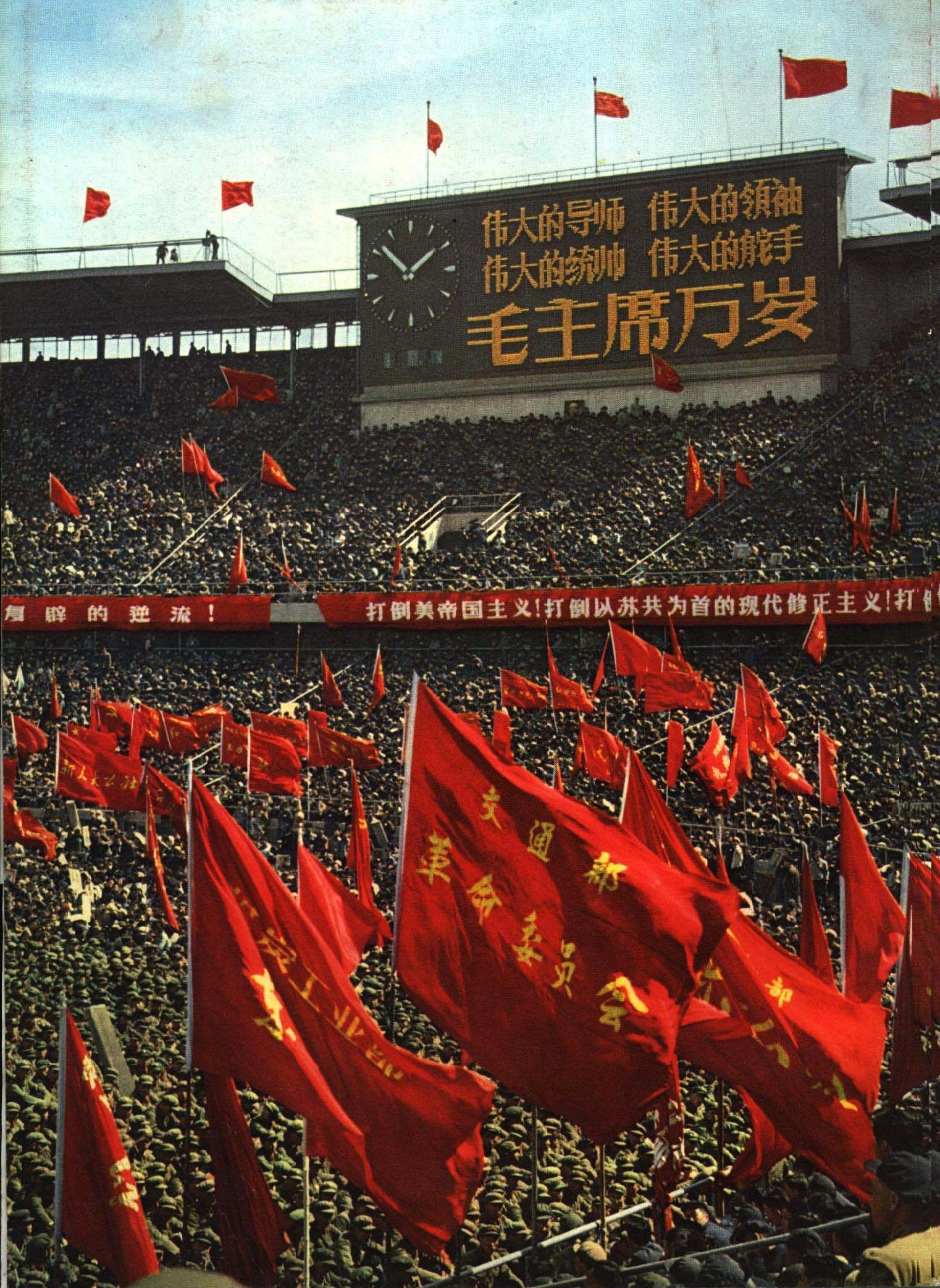
Inaugural meeting of the Beijing Revolutionary Committee, 1967.

Revolutionary committees (Chinese: 革命委员会; pinyin: Gémìng wěiyuánhuì) were tripartite bodies established during the Cultural Revolution (1966–1976) in the People's Republic of China to facilitate government by the three mass organizations in China – the people, the People's Liberation Army (PLA), and the Chinese Communist Party (CCP). They were originally established in the power-seizure movement as a replacement to the government of China. Some have argued that it quickly became subordinate to it, whereas others have argued that it effectively supplanted the old apparatus, replacing it with an accountable system elected annually by the people through mass organizations, for the duration of the Cultural Revolution.

== Background ==
As the spirit of the Cultural Revolution spread across China in the latter half of 1966, it soon became clear to the Maoist leadership in Beijing that the ability of local party organizations and officials to resist the attempts by the Red Guards to remove them from power was greater than had been thought. As a result, Mao Zedong proposed dramatic seizures of power by the various Red Guard and workers' groups and the establishment of new local governments based on Karl Marx's Paris Commune model. The first of these planned power seizures was to come with the founding of the Shanghai Commune in February 1967.

However, in January and February 1967, in Shanxi province and in Harbin, the capital of Heilongjiang province, two other power seizures of power had occurred, with People's Liberation Army (PLA) soldiers assisting workers and the Red Guards in overthrowing the old CCP authorities – the Harbin revolutionary committee (established on 1 February) was to be the first to be endorsed by Beijing. In both cases, the victors had established 'triple alliances' of the rebel people's organisations, the army and CCP cadres. These alliances were soon to be known as revolutionary committees. The leadership including Mao Zedong, who had originally advocated the commune system of government, was attracted to this new type of government, and by the end of February it had publicly stated that revolutionary committees were the only acceptable way of reorganizing government.

== Role during the Cultural Revolution ==
With the decision of the leadership to support the concept of revolutionary committees, from February 1967 onwards mass organizations were encouraged to ally with cadres and the army to establish this new type of government. However, by the end of April 1967, only six of China's twenty-seven provinces (Beijing, Shanghai, Heilongjiang, Shanxi, Guizhou and Shandong) had established revolutionary committees with official approval, due to the continued resistance by old CCP organizations and the lack of agreement amongst mass organizations and the PLA over which party cadres were appropriate choices for the committees. By the end of 1967, only two more revolutionary committees (in Inner Mongolia and in the city of Tianjin) had been formed, despite a call from Mao in September for the forging of these alliances.

Following the founding of nine more revolutionary committees (including in Fujian and Jiangxi provinces) by March, in the summer of 1968, as the Red Guard movement was virtually extinguished by PLA suppression, in an effort to restore some unity to the Cultural Revolution there was another drive by the leadership to establish provincial level revolutionary committees. As a result, by the end of September 1968, all of China's provinces and autonomous regions had provincial-level organisations in place (with the last revolutionary committee being formed in Xinjiang province), and these groups were given the task of facilitating the establishment of similarly structured committees at a district, county and municipal level.

Some have alleged that the majority of revolutionary committees created rapidly came to be dominated by the PLA, because the army had military force at its disposal to enforce its will. For example, in the leadership of the revolutionary committee in Shanghai, seven out of the thirteen members were army officers. Twenty out of twenty-nine provincial revolutionary committees were chaired PLA officers, and in several provinces PLA soldiers chaired up to 98% of revolutionary committees above the county level. More often than not, in the interests of stability and order, the PLA allied with cadres on the revolutionary committees against the more radical organisations of the masses. Therefore, at the end of September 1968, only revolutionary committees in Shaanxi and Hubei provinces were chaired by civilians. Furthermore, the majority of those that sat on the revolutionary committees as representatives of the people were those who had had a stake in the pre-Cultural Revolution order of things rather than radicals from the movement itself.

Some have also argued that by 1969, it was also the case that both urban and rural revolutionary committees at all levels quickly became subordinate to existing or revived Party committees. The leadership of both organisations was often almost identical, and revolutionary committees became little more than instruments of the Party committees' bidding. This was particularly evident with the factory revolutionary committees – heralded as one of the great achievements of the Cultural Revolution, they were often little more than bureaucratic extensions of Party power.

However some, such as Dongping Han, have argued that, at the local level at least, the Revolutionary Committees were an important tool of popular power, accountable and representative of the people throughout the Cultural Revolution.

== Role after the Cultural Revolution ==
With the winding down of the radical phase of the Cultural Revolution in 1969 and 1970, the revolutionary committees became increasingly bureaucratic and an organizational and ideological formality. Although originally tasked with the representation of the Cultural Revolution's mass organizations (the Red Guards and the worker's groups), the dispersal of these mass groups made the revolutionary committees increasingly defunct, especially as the Party had regained administrative control of China. However, they were maintained for their increasingly effective bureaucratic role (they were more efficient than the conventional Party apparatus of government) and as the leadership did not want to undermine the ideological success of the Cultural Revolution.

The future role of the revolutionary committees was to be formalised at the 4th National People's Congress held in January 1975. This congress ratified a new version of the constitution of the People's Republic of China, in which the revolutionary committees were established as permanent fixtures of the country's administration, but they were not given any role in the formulation of policy. In addition, the three members of the 'triple alliance' principle on which the revolutionary committees were founded were redefined as 'the old, the middle aged and the young'.

However, in 1978, after an eleven-year history, revolutionary committees were abolished by the post-Mao government.

== See also ==
- Power seizure
- January Storm
- Violent struggle
- Revolutionary committee (Soviet)
