= Shanghai Municipality (1927–1949) =

Municipality of the Republic of China

Coordinates: 31°10′N 121°28′E

Shanghai abbr. 滬, 滬市
- Special municipality of Republic of China
- 1927–1949
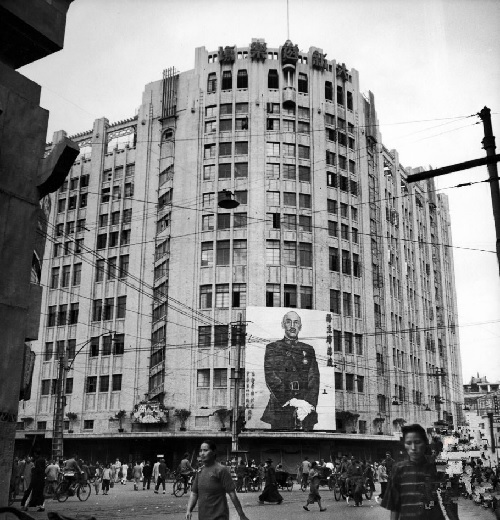
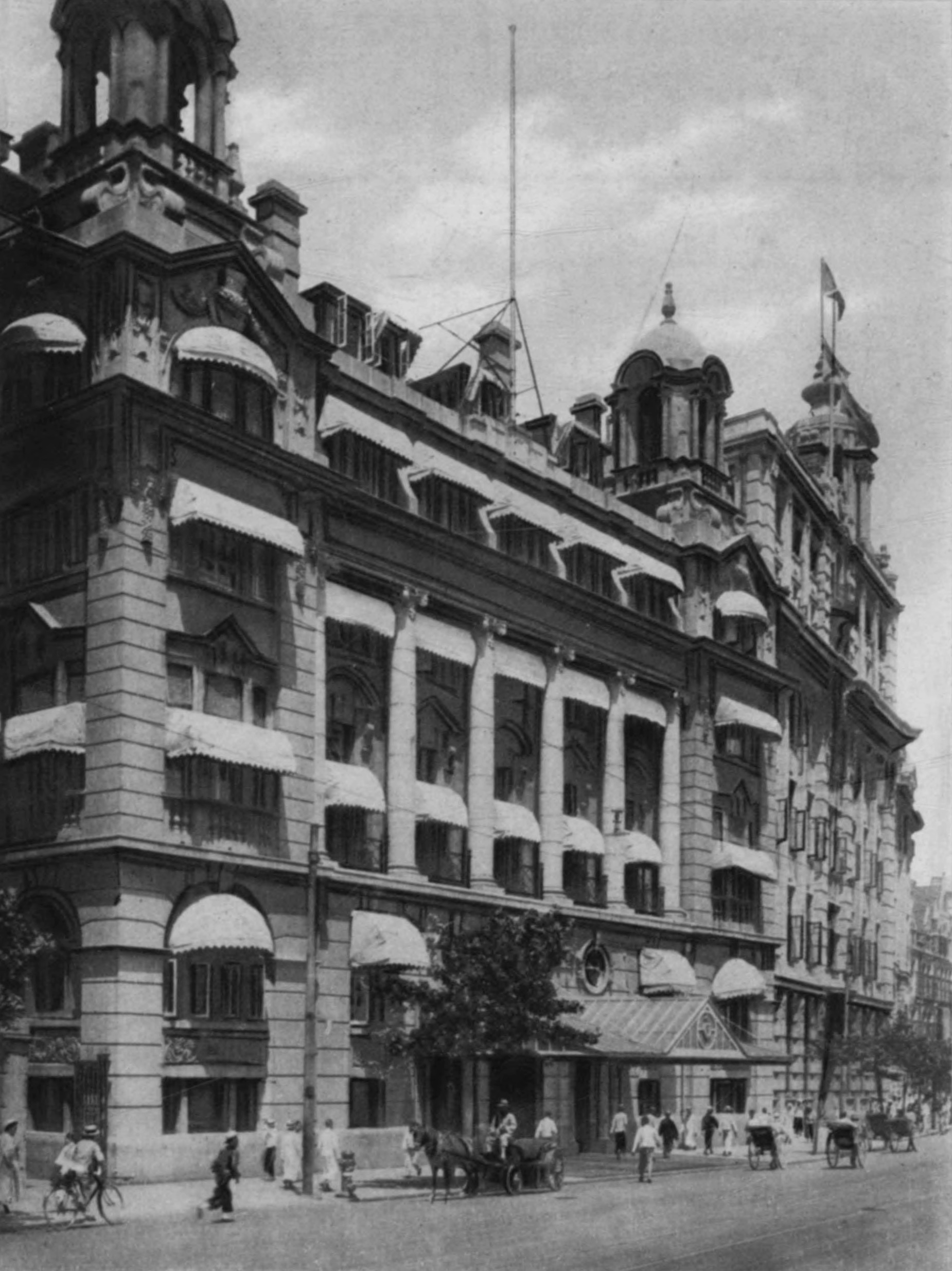
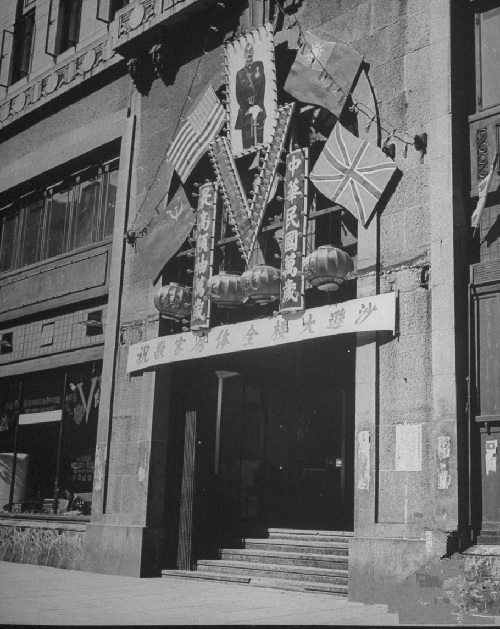
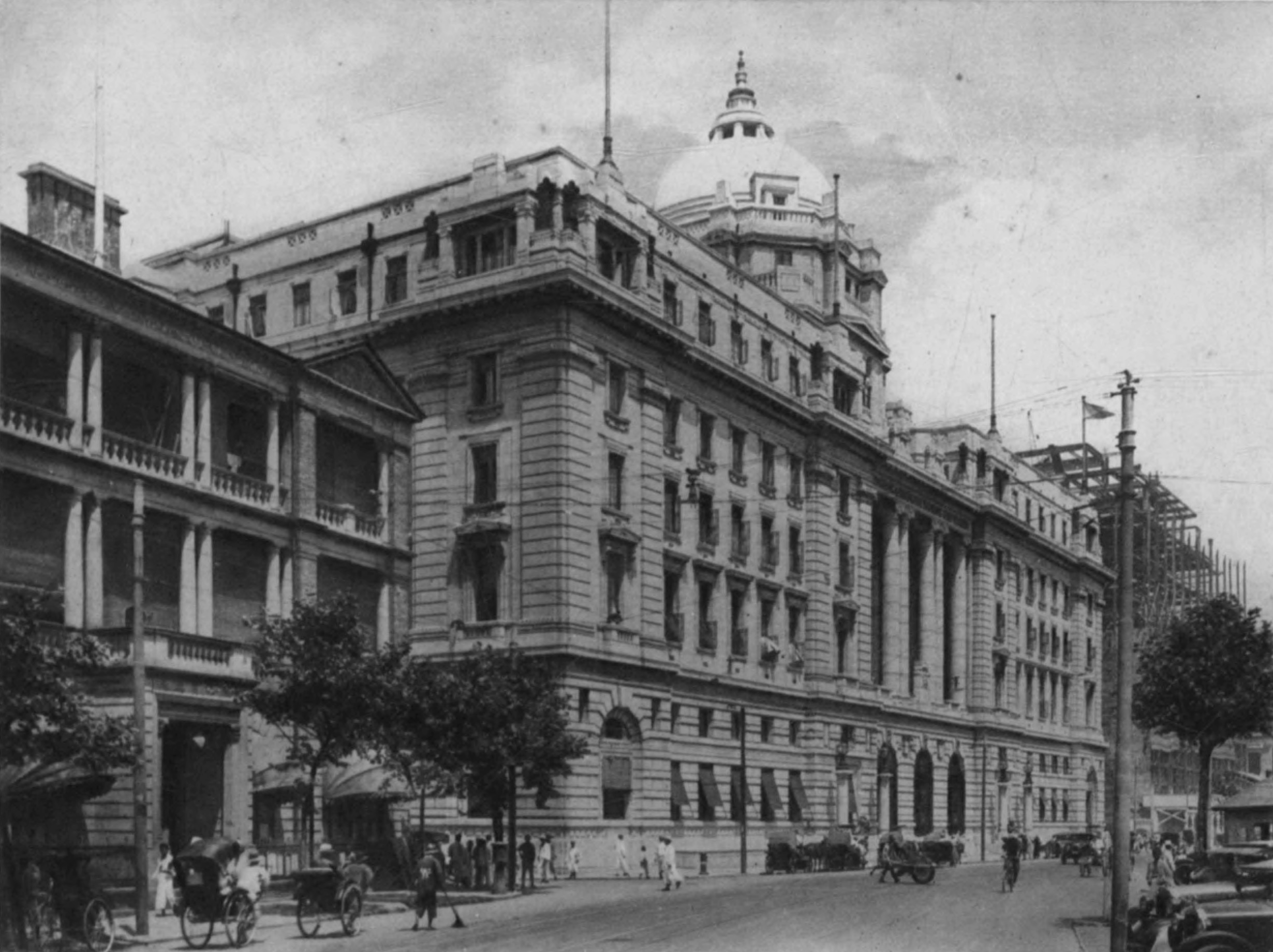
- Top to bottom, left to right: The Bund in 1930; a portrait of Chiang Kai-shek displayed at the Liu Xin Recreation Park to celebrate victory in the Second Sino-Japanese War; Sassoon House in 1945; the Shanghai Club in 1927; the Hongkong and Shanghai Banking Corporation building in 1927

- Location of Shanghai Municipality within the Republic of China, 1948
- Area
  - 1946: 617.995 km^{2} (238.609 sq mi)
- Population
  - 1948: 5,448,466
- History
  - Reorganised from the planned Songhu Special Municipality, which had been proposed in 1925 to be formed by merging parts of Shanghai County and Baoshan County: 29 March 1927
  - Reorganised as Shanghai: May 1930
  - "January 28" Incident: demilitarisation of Shanghai: 3 March 1932
  - Imperial Japanese Armed Forces invasion of Shanghai; Battle of Shanghai begins: 13 August 1937
  - Surrender of Japan; the Nationalist government recovers Shanghai: 15 August 1945
  - People's Liberation Army captures Shanghai: 27 May 1949
Preceded by
1925: Songhu Special Municipality (planned, not realised)
1943: International Settlement
French Concession
1945: Shanghai Special Municipality
Succeeded by
1937: Great Way Government
1949: Shanghai
- Today part of: China, Shanghai

Shanghai Municipality (上海市), commonly known as Shanghai (上海, postal romanization: Shanghai; Wade–Giles: Shang-hai (Note: Gwoyeu Romatzyh: Shanqhae; Morrison romanization: Shanghae)), abbreviated as "Hu" (沪), was one of the 12 direct-controlled municipalities established by the Republic of China in mainland China, and at the time was the largest city in the Far East and Asia, as well as China's most important treaty port and industrial centre, and was known as the "Paris of the Orient". It was described by the then-chairman of the National Government Chiang Kai-shek as "the focal point of Chinese and foreign attention".

In 1927, the Shanghai Special Municipality was established as a direct-controlled municipality. Following the January 28 incident of 1932, China and Japan signed an armistice agreement after negotiations, and Shanghai became a demilitarised zone. During the Battle of Shanghai in 1937, Japanese forces occupied the Chinese-administered areas of Shanghai and parts of the Shanghai International Settlement, and subsequently propped up puppet regimes including the Great Way Municipal Government of Shanghai.

After victory in the Second Sino-Japanese War in 1945, the National Government took over Shanghai, ending the long-established concession system. The Chinese Communist Party reignited fighting in Manchuria, triggering the Second Chinese Civil War. Shanghai's economy was severely damaged by the war, and after the civil war resumed, inflation caused by the fighting led to soaring prices. In 1948, the ROC government's Gold Yuan reform failed, causing Shanghai's economy to collapse further.

In May 1949, the People's Liberation Army launched the Battle of Shanghai; after several days of fierce fighting, it took control of the entire city on 27 May, and the central government relocated part of its assets and personnel to Taiwan. On 28 May, the Shanghai Municipal Government ceased operations, and acting mayor Zhao Zukang transferred power to the CCP-appointed mayor Chen Yi.

== History ==
=== Early period of direct administration ===
In 1925, the Beiyang government had already planned to carve out the northern part of Shanghai County and the southern part of Baoshan County to create the Songhu Special Municipality, but this was never realised. On 29 March 1927 (the 16th year of the Republic), the Wuhan National Government established the Shanghai Special Municipality in areas of Shanghai outside the concessions, and established the Provisional Municipal Government of Shanghai Special Municipality to administer it. At the same time, 17 urban and rural areas previously belonging to Shanghai County and Baoshan County under Jiangsu Province were incorporated, giving a total area of 494 square kilometres. Shanghai formally separated from Jiangsu Province's jurisdiction and came under the direct authority of the Executive Yuan. After the April 12 incident, the Provisional Municipal Government of Shanghai Special Municipality effectively ceased operations and was ultimately taken over by the Kuomintang Shanghai Provisional Political Committee.

After the establishment of the National Government of China (hereafter "National Government"), the Shanghai Special Municipality Government was formally constituted on 7 July 1927 in accordance with the Provisional Regulations of the Shanghai Special Municipality. (Note: Works related to Provisional Regulations of the Shanghai Special Municipality at Wikisource in Chinese.) Subsequently, the promulgation of the Organic Law of the Shanghai Special Municipality and the Organic Law of Shanghai Municipality gradually established a two-tier administrative management system at the municipal and district levels.

Because of its proximity to the ROC capital Nanjing and its role as a centre of foreign trade, large numbers of financial institutions—including the four major banks—established their headquarters in Shanghai, further consolidating its status as the national economic and financial centre. As Nanjing was designated the ROC capital, many politicians who had previously gathered in Beiping and Tianjin moved south, and many chose to settle in the Shanghai concessions. Both the concession areas and the Chinese-administered areas of Shanghai developed rapidly during the subsequent Golden Decade of the National Government.

In May 1930, the National Government issued the Organic Law of Shanghai Municipality, reorganising the Shanghai Special Municipality as Shanghai Municipality, and in July of the same year established the Shanghai Municipal Government.

=== Demilitarisation ===
After the Mukden incident in 1931 (the 20th year of the Republic), anti-Japanese sentiment ran high among the Chinese public, and Japan announced it would take self-defence measures to protect the interests of Japanese nationals. On 18 January 1932 (the 21st year of the Republic), Japanese monks passing the gate of the Sanyou Industrial Factory on Mayan Road in the Chinese-administered area adjacent to the eastern district (Yangshùpu) of the Shanghai International Settlement were beaten by factory pickets, resulting in one death; this became known as the Japanese monks' incident. Japanese residents retaliated violently, burning down the Sanyou factory, killing Chinese police constables in the concession, and attacking Chinese shops. At 23:30 on 28 January, Japanese naval landing forces advanced westward from North Sichuan Road to occupy the Songhu Railway defence line, where they met fierce resistance from the 19th Route Army at Tiantong'an station. In the early morning of 29 January, Japanese aircraft bombed the Chinese-administered areas of Zhabei; the Commercial Press at 584 Baoshan Road and the Oriental Library (China's largest private library, housing over 300,000 volumes) were both destroyed. Intense military conflict between China and Japan in the Zhabei district of Shanghai lasted over a month; Japan committed a total force of three divisions and 70,000 troops, while Zhang Zhizhong's 5th Army also joined the fighting in Shanghai, and the Nanjing National Government even temporarily relocated to Luoyang to demonstrate its resolve not to capitulate (returning to Nanjing at the end of the year). It was not until 2 March, when Japanese forces landed at Taicang Liuhe and Chinese troops found themselves threatened from the rear, that a withdrawal began; a ceasefire was declared the following day. On 5 May, China and Japan signed the Songhu Ceasefire Agreement. Japanese troops returned to their pre-war positions (the northern and eastern districts of the Shanghai International Settlement and their extraterritorially built roads), while ROC troops temporarily remained at their current positions (from Anting on the Jing–Hu Railway to Hupu on the Yangtze). Shanghai was demilitarised. Some 4,204 businesses in the Chinese-administered Zhabei area were destroyed, along with 19,700 dwellings; this event is historically known as the January 28 incident.

=== Japanese occupation ===
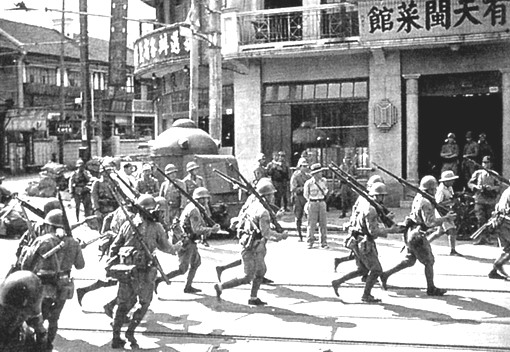
Japanese army troops invading Shanghai during the Battle of Shanghai

On 13 August 1937 (the 26th year of the Republic), the Battle of Shanghai broke out, marking the beginning of the full-scale war of resistance. Chiang Kai-shek mobilised approximately 700,000 Chinese troops (including most of his elite forces) and fought a fierce three-month battle against Japanese forces near Shanghai. Although the National Revolutionary Army paid an enormous price, it was ultimately defeated by the superior Japanese forces, and Japanese troops occupied all of Shanghai except the concessions. During the Battle of Shanghai, the previously bustling Zhabei and Nanshi districts suffered severe damage and the Chinese-administered areas largely became slums. The northern half of the Shanghai International Settlement—comprising present-day Hongkou and Yangpu—served as a Japanese military zone and sphere of influence, and was as devastated as the Chinese-administered areas. Tongji University (Wusong), Fudan University (Jiangwan), and Shanghai Law College were all bombed. The Shanghai French Concession and the portion of the Shanghai International Settlement south of Suzhou Creek found themselves in a unique situation, giving rise to the Isolated Island Period that lasted over four years. In October 1938, Shanghai was renamed Shanghai Special Municipality. After the outbreak of the Pacific War in 1941 (the 30th year of the Republic), Japanese forces began occupying the concessions, and from 1943 (the 32nd year of the Republic) the concessions ceased to exist.

=== Post-war period ===
In 1945 (the 34th year of the Republic), Shanghai was recovered after the victory in the war of resistance and the National Government took control of Shanghai from the Japanese. Soon after the end of hostilities, in 1946 (the 35th year of the Republic) large-scale conflict broke out in Manchuria between the National Government-controlled National Revolutionary Army and the Chinese Communist Party-led Northeast Democratic Allied Army. The fighting initially took place in Manchuria and had not yet affected Shanghai, but as the conflict expanded, the economic burden of war mounted and the economy progressively collapsed. Shanghai's economy fell into crisis, prices soared, and the government's economic and currency reform launched in 1948 (the 37th year of the Republic) also ended in failure. At the end of that year, the Huaihai Campaign, fought by the Nationalist and Communist forces near Xuzhou, resulted in the destruction of nearly 600,000 Nationalist troops; the People's Liberation Army seized the vast area north of the middle and lower reaches of the Yangtze River. The principal Nationalist forces on the East China and Central Plains fronts were largely annihilated, and the capital Nanjing as well as the financial centre Shanghai came under direct threat from the PLA.

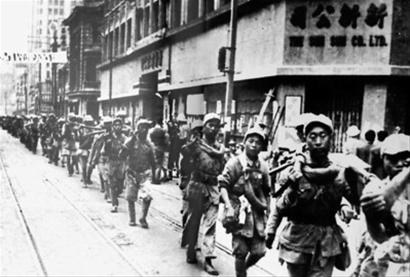
The People's Liberation Army entering Nanjing Road, Shanghai on 25 May 1949.

On the night of 20 April 1949 (the 38th year of the Republic), the People's Liberation Army launched the Jing–Hu–Hang Campaign (Yangtze Crossing Campaign), and by the early morning of the 22nd had successfully breached the Nationalist ROC Army's lower Yangtze defence line. On the 23rd, the PLA captured Nanjing, and the Republic of China government relocated its capital to Guangzhou. In Shanghai, Nationalist forces relied on 250,000 troops and numerous fortifications to hold the city. The PLA decided to avoid directly attacking the urban area to reduce losses, and postponed the attack until after 10 May, concentrating forces in preparation for a pincer assault to encircle Shanghai.

The PLA launched an offensive on two lines—north and south—against Shanghai's outer defences. The northern forces gradually broke through Nationalist defensive lines at Wusong, Yuepu and other places, while the southern forces captured key towns surrounding Pudong and cut off Nationalist supply lines. After several days of fierce fighting, the PLA broke through the main Nationalist positions, blockaded the sea area east of Gaoqiao, and forced the main Nationalist forces to contract towards Wusong and the surrounding urban area. At this point, the outer Nationalist defensive system had been completely destroyed.

On the night of 23 May, the PLA launched its general offensive on the Shanghai urban area. On the 25th, the Nationalist garrison surrendered en masse, including the deputy commander of the Songhu Garrison, Liu Changyi, and multiple units. By the afternoon of the 27th, the PLA had completely occupied the Shanghai urban area. On the 28th, the Shanghai Municipal Government ceased operations, and acting mayor Zhao Zhukang transferred power to the CCP-appointed mayor of Shanghai, Chen Yi. On the same day, the Shanghai Municipal People's Government was formally established at the former site of the Shanghai Municipal Government.

Although the government was dissolved, the ROC on Taiwan would continue to claim Shanghai as part of its territory, but the democratization and constitutional reforms would downplay the claims of it.

== Images ==
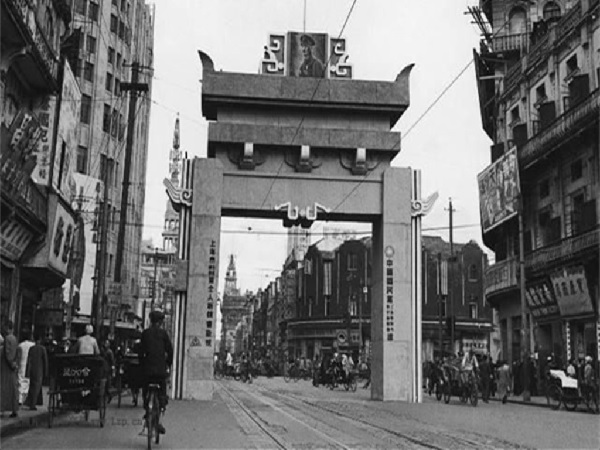
The victory arch on Nanjing Road, Shanghai, after the victory in the Second Sino-Japanese War, 1945

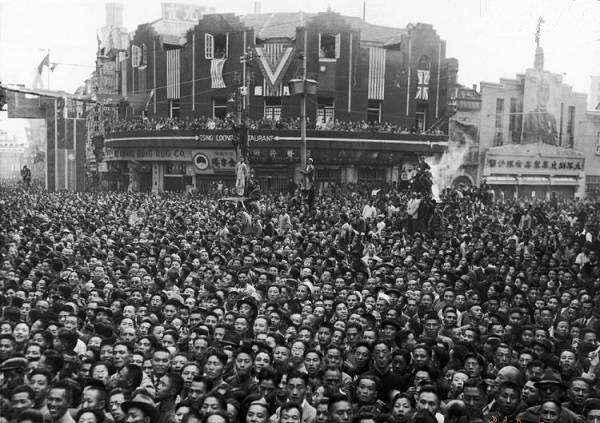
Crowd at the 1945 victory parade, with a blurred portrait of Chiang Kai-shek visible in the upper right corner

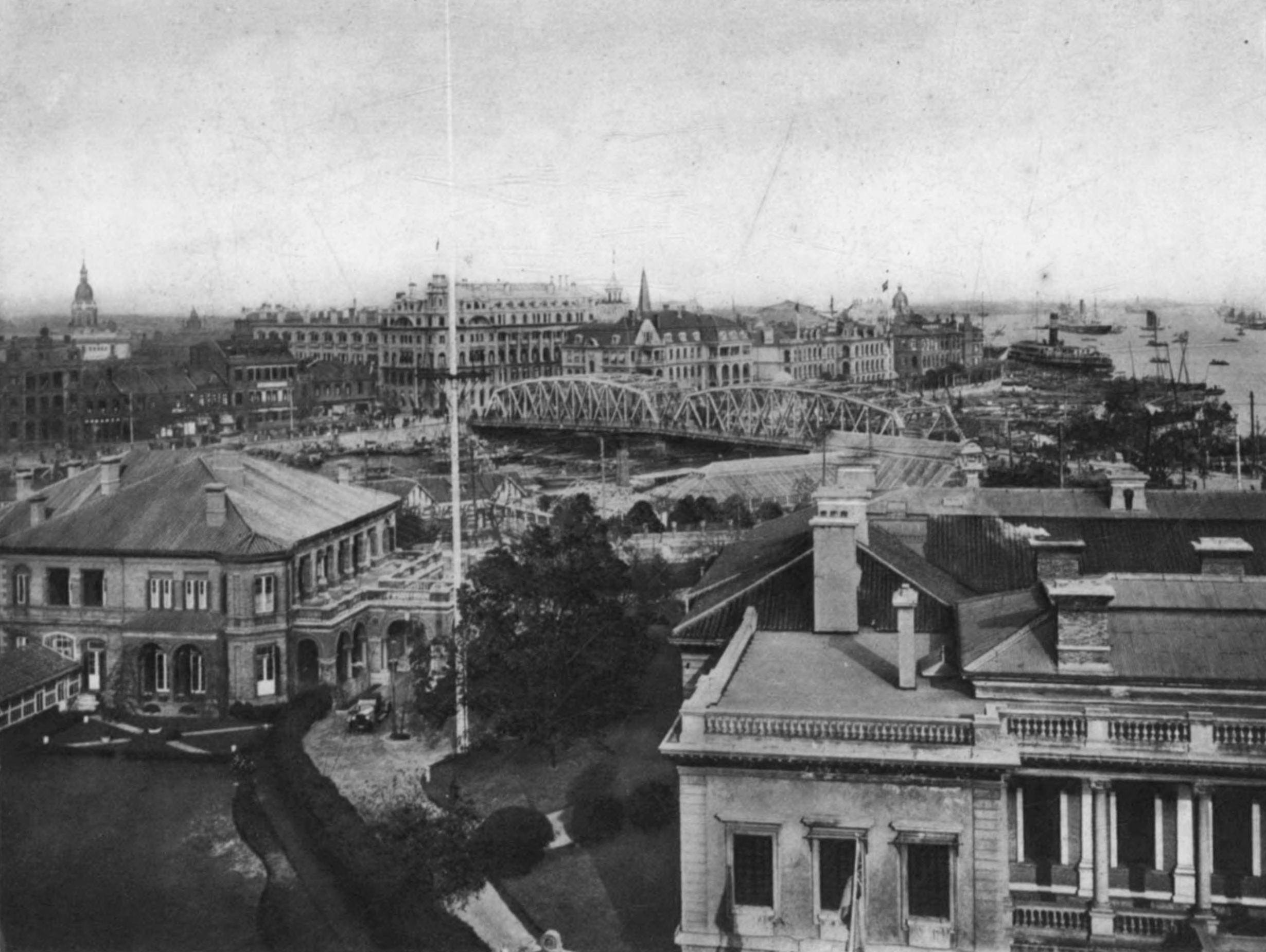
The British Consulate-General in Shanghai office in 1927, photographed at the present site of the Former British Consulate-General Shanghai

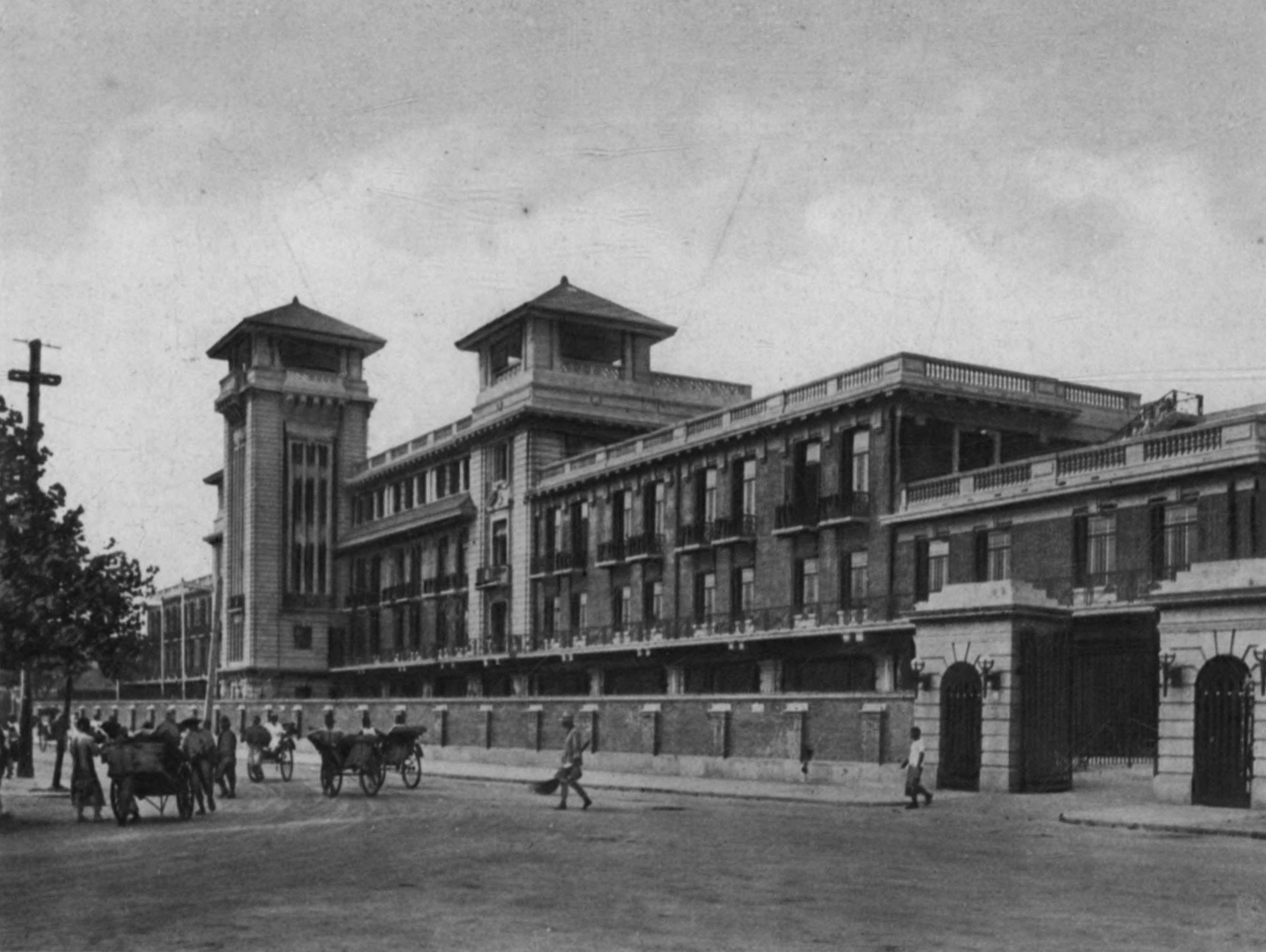
The Shanghai Racecourse in 1927

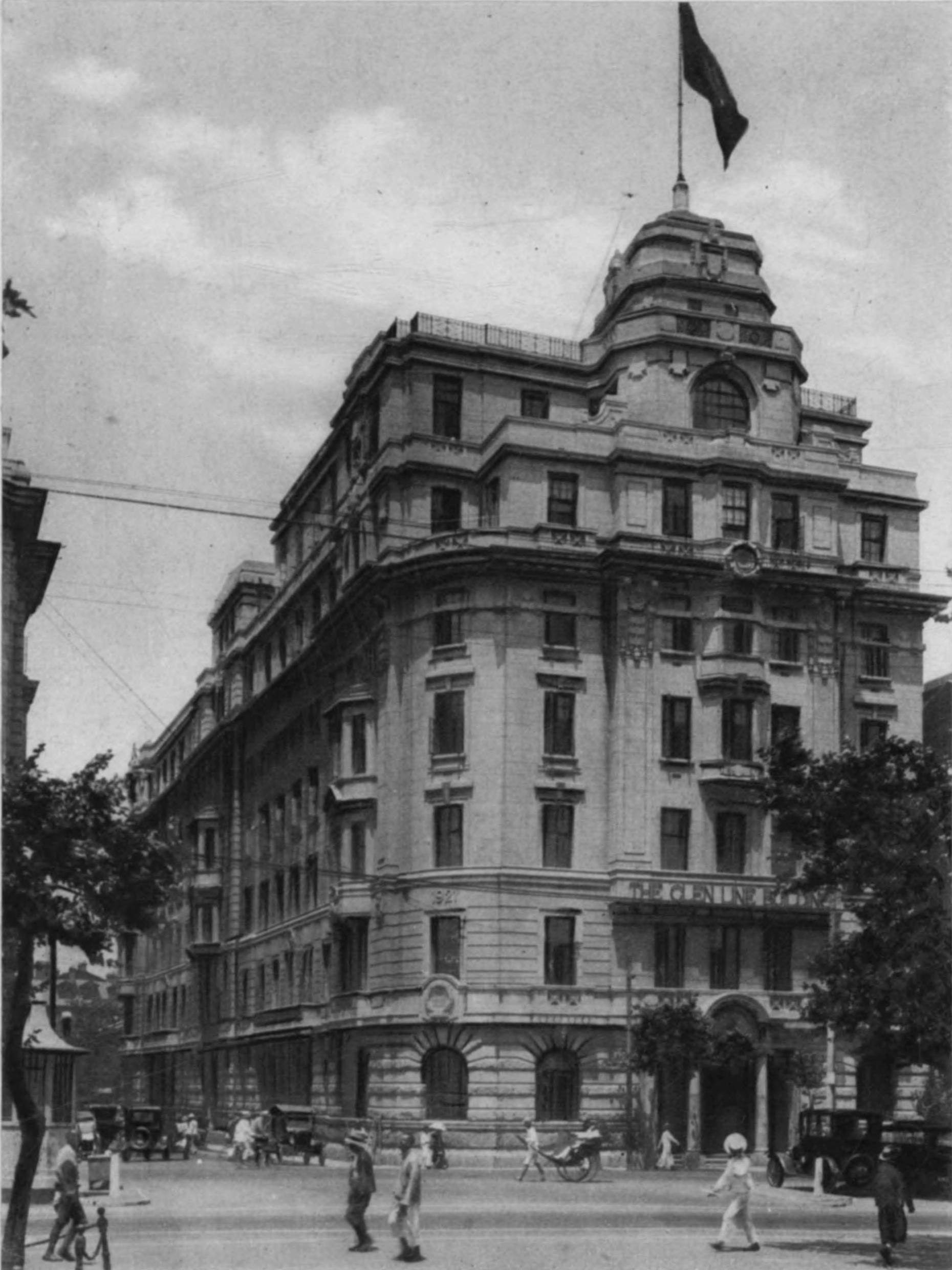
The Glen Line Building in 1927

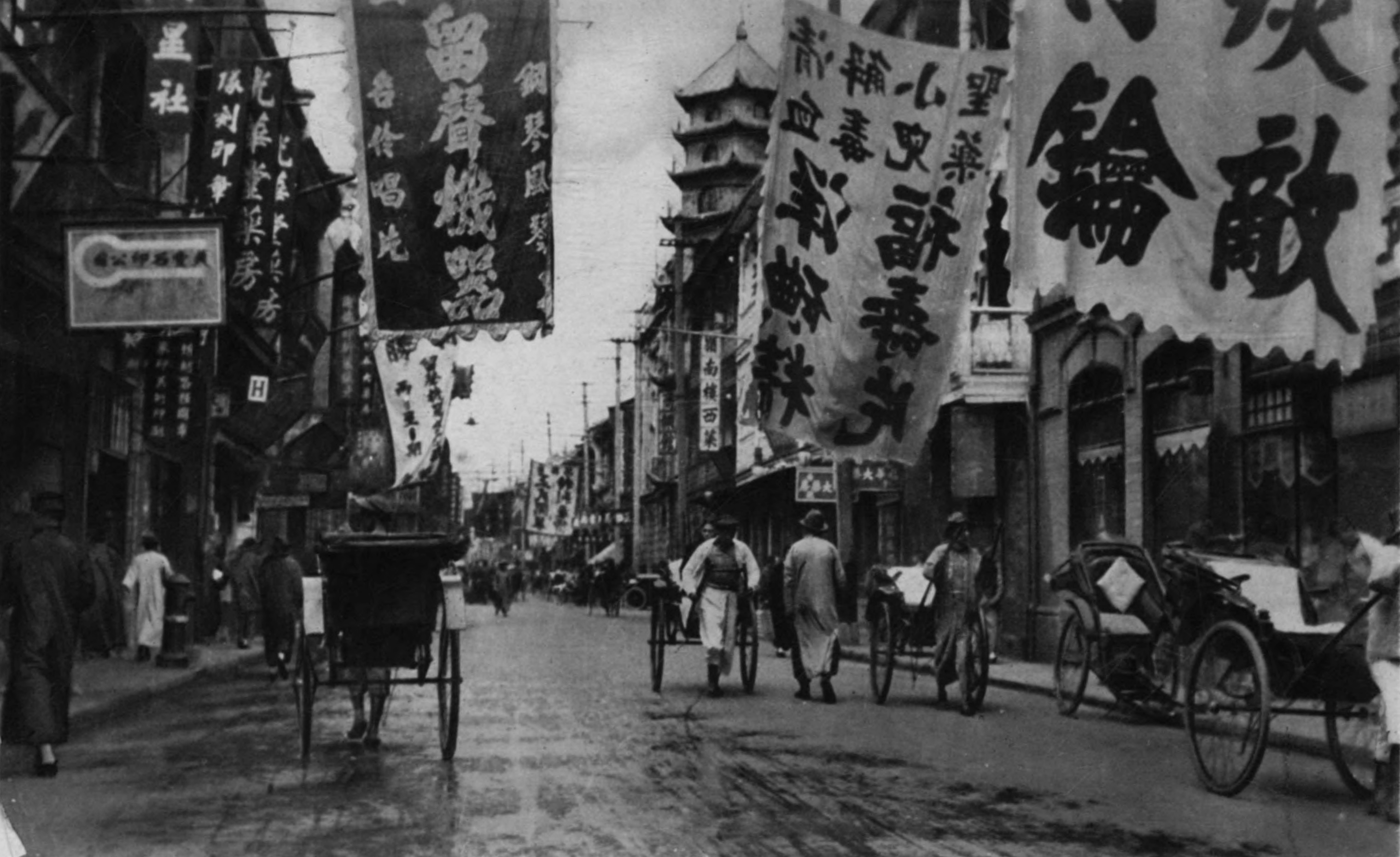
Fuzhou Road in 1927

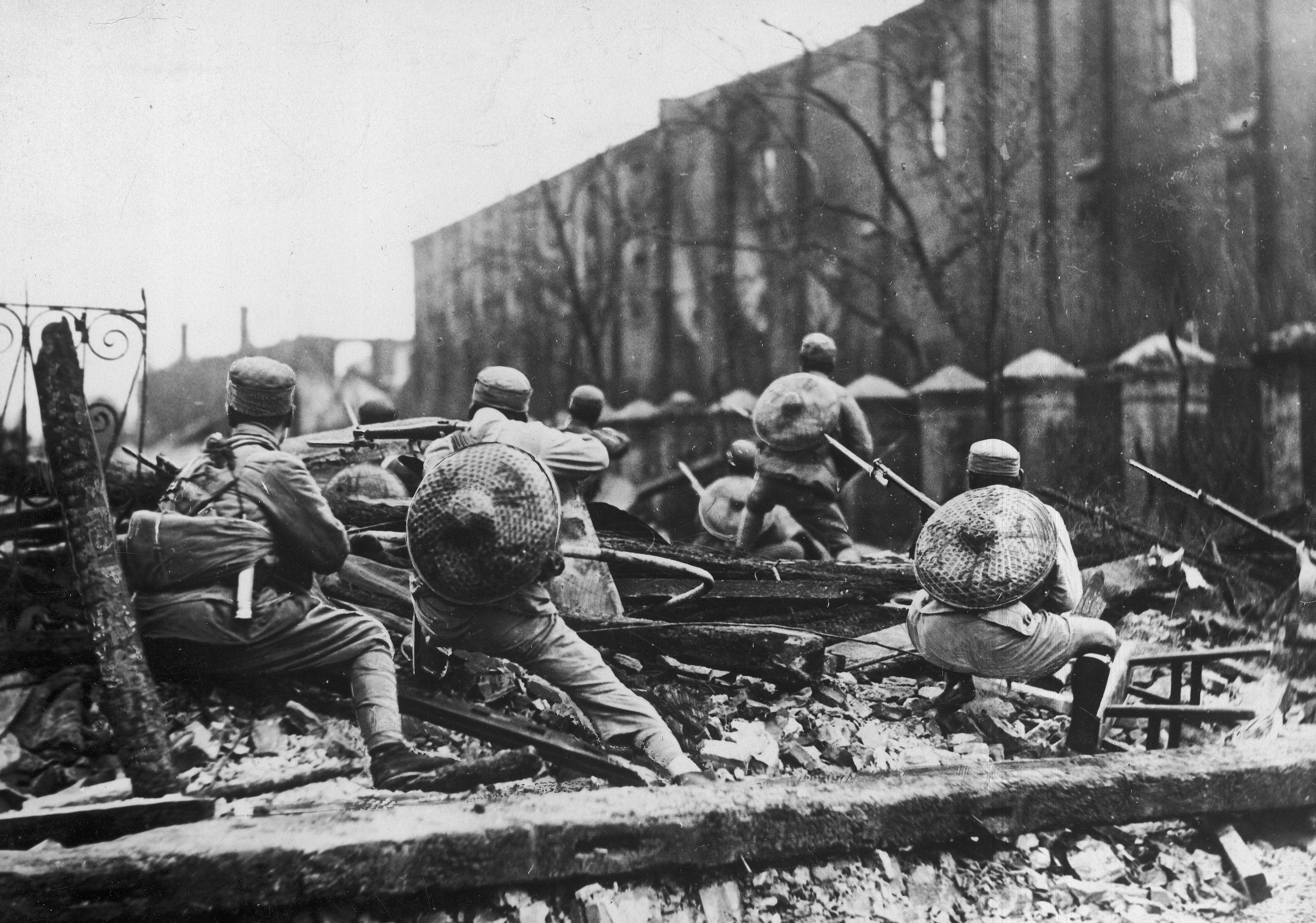
The 19th Route Army during the January 28 incident in 1932

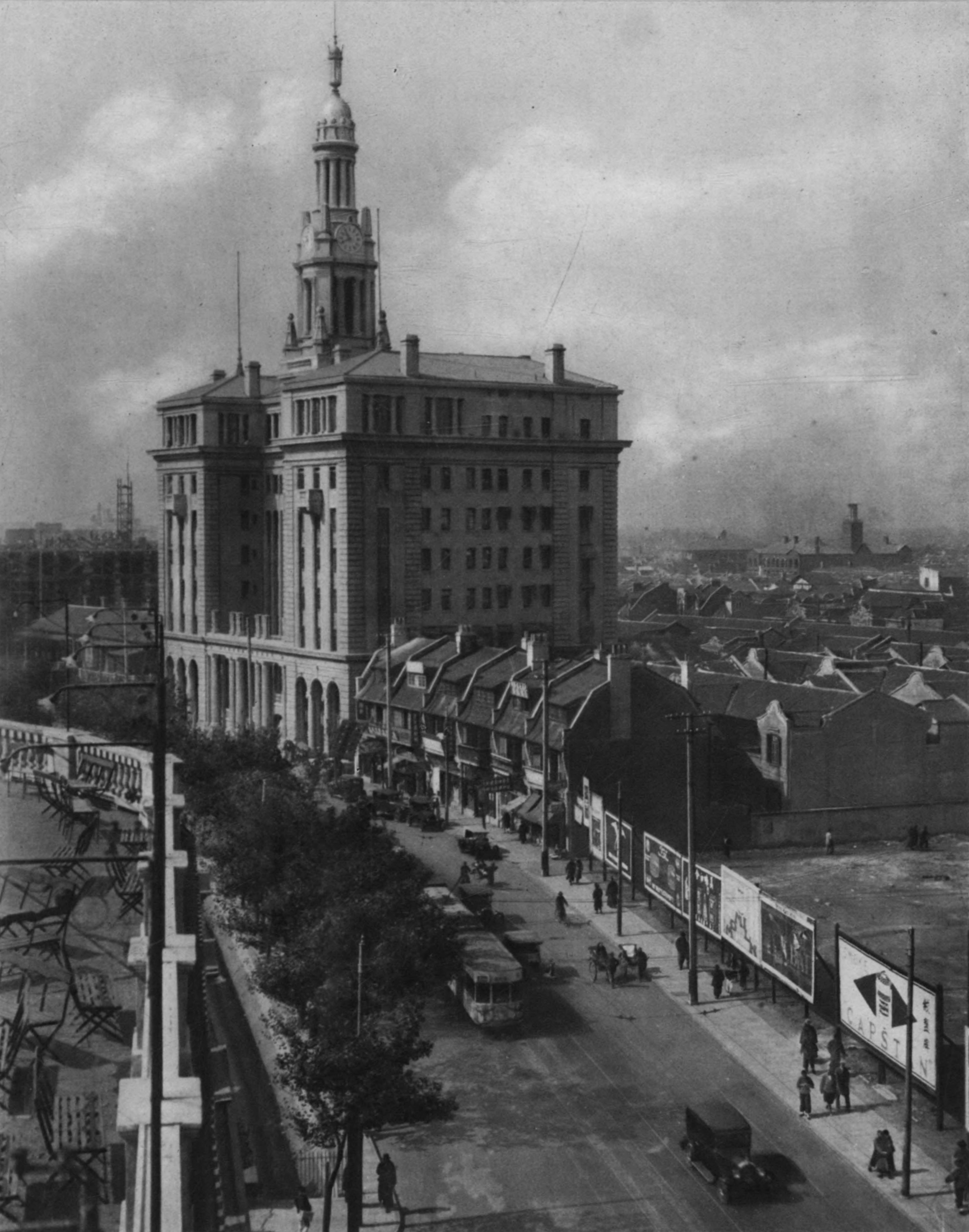
The United China Assurance Company building on Bubbling Well Road in 1927

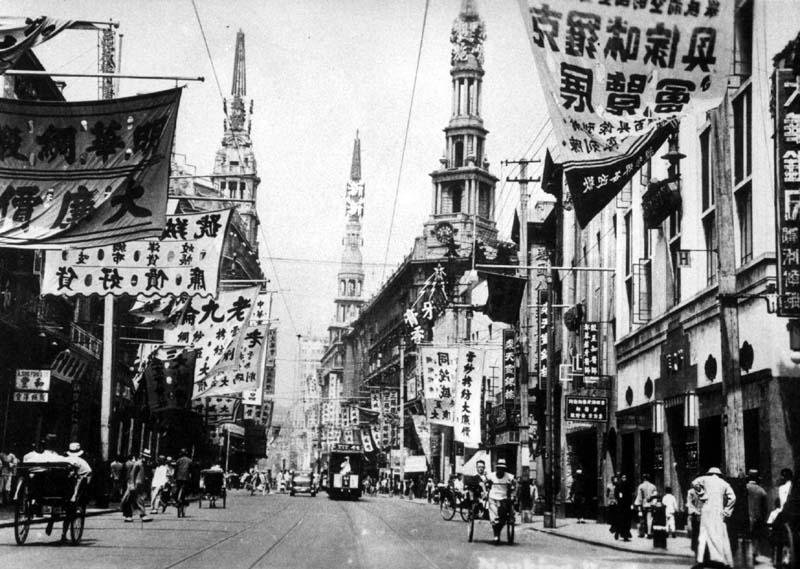
Nanjing Road in the 1930s

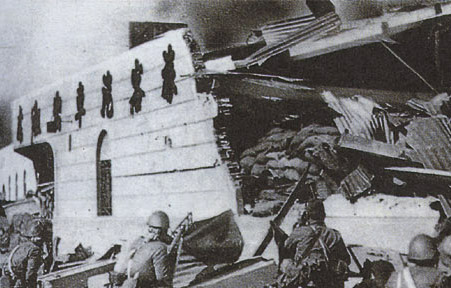
The Battle of Shanghai, 1937

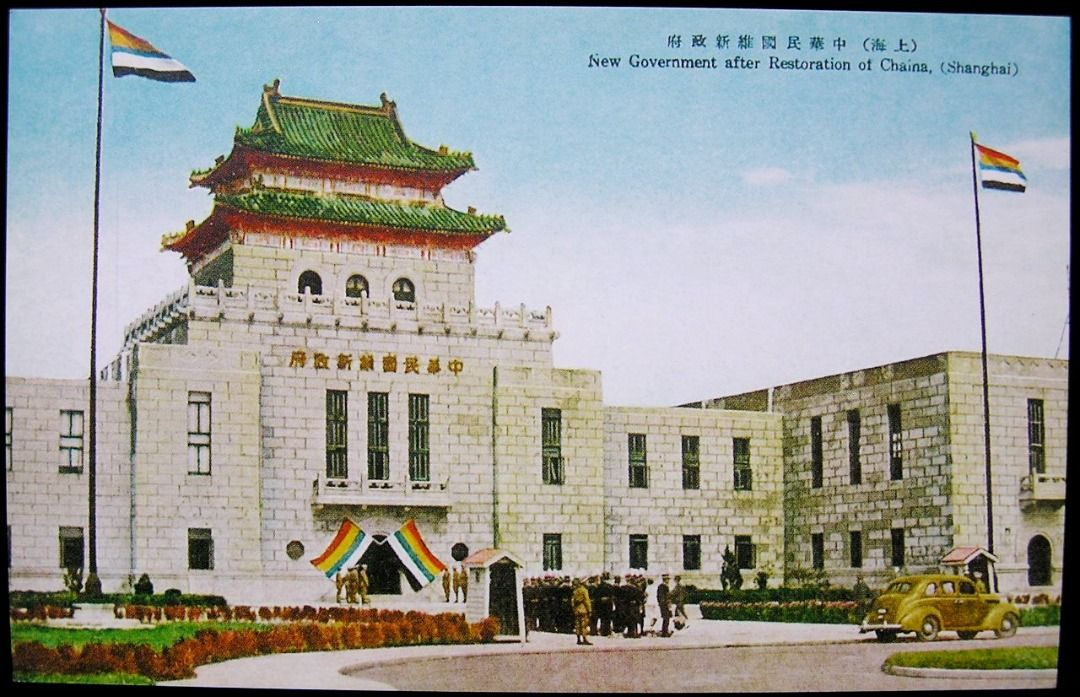
The Reorganised Government of the Republic of China puppet regime established by Japan in Shanghai

== Administrative divisions ==
=== Territory ===
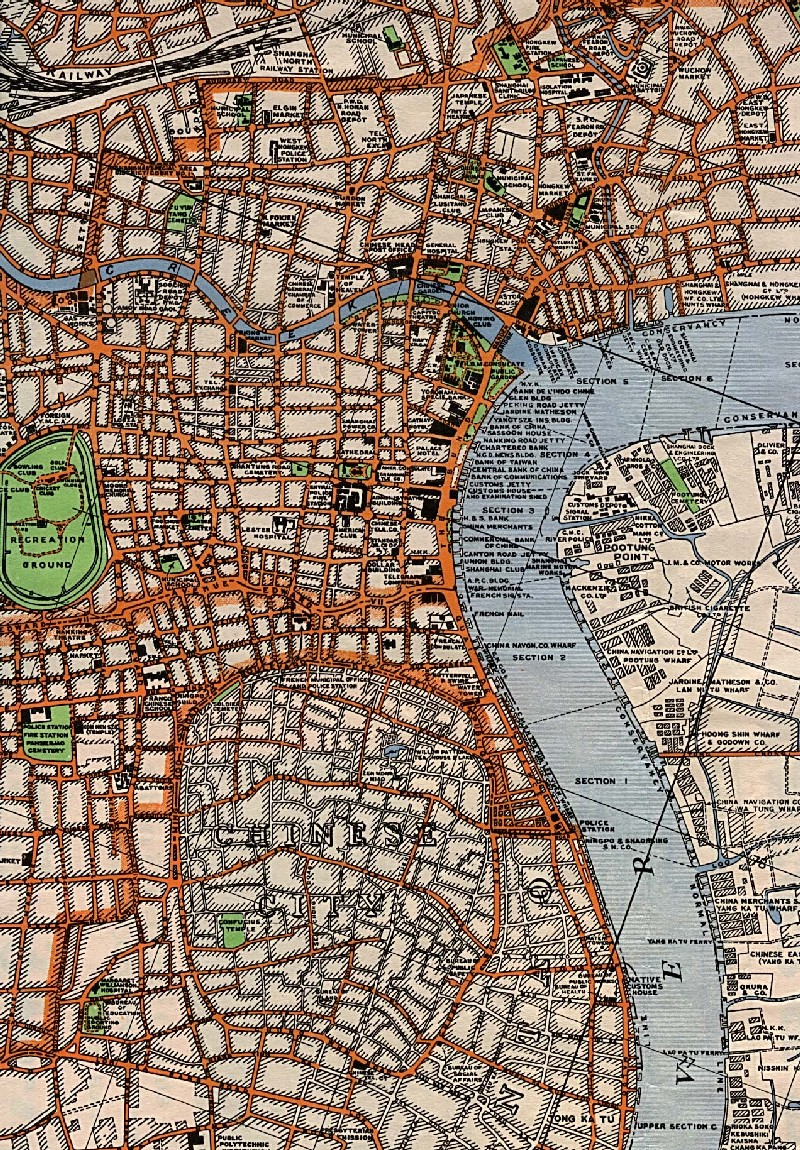
The central urban area of Shanghai in 1933 (the 22nd year of the Republic), which broadly corresponds to the full extent of Shanghai circa 1899 (the 25th year of the Guangxu era): the Chinese-administered Nanshi in the south, the International Settlement on both banks of the Suzhou Creek to the north, and the French Concession between them

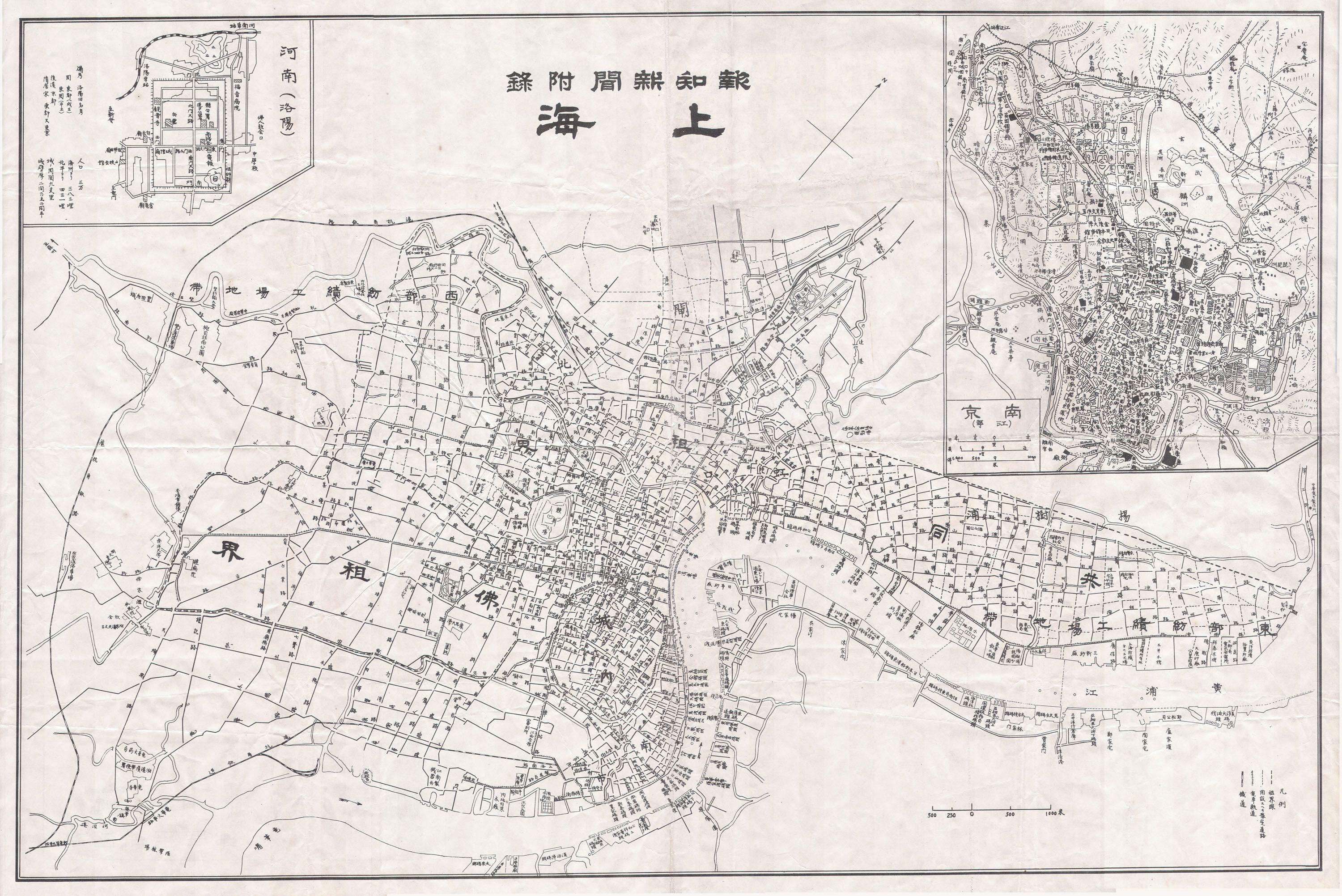
1932 map of Yangshùpu and Hongkou areas of Shanghai, including the Shanghai city proper, French Concession and Shanghai International Settlement at the time.

From the Shanghai Special Municipality to the Shanghai Municipality, although the city boundaries changed frequently during this period, the area was generally on both sides of the Pujiang River, with a total area of 617 square kilometres.

In February 1925 (the 14th year of the Republic), the Autonomy Council composed of Shanghai's municipal directors and the Special Provisional Municipal Assembly drafted the Songhu Special Municipality Convention, proposing that the special municipality's area include the full territory of Shanghai, Baoshan, and Chuansha counties, as well as the Yuanbei District of Nanhui County and the Liuhe District of Taicang County, comprising 8 townships and 32 rural areas. However, this was not approved by the Beiyang government.

In May 1926 (the 15th year of the Republic), the warlord Sun Chuanfang established the Songhu Treaty Port Supervisory Office at Longhua Town, Shanghai County, and declared that the commercial port area would encompass the entire territory of Shanghai County and 25 urban and rural areas of Baoshan County including Wusong, Gaoqiao, Yinxing, Jiangwan, Zhenru, and Pengpu.

On 7 May 1927 (the 16th year of the Republic), the 89th meeting of the KMT Central Political Council resolved to pass and promulgate the Provisional Regulations of the Shanghai Special Municipality. Article 4 of the Regulations stipulated that "the original Songhu area belonging to Shanghai and Baoshan Counties shall constitute the administrative area of the Special Municipality", encompassing the entire territory of Shanghai County, half of Baoshan County, and small portions each of Songjiang, Qingpu, and Nanhui counties. Since Shanghai County was one of the wealthiest counties in Jiangsu Province at the time, incorporating the entire county into the Shanghai Special Municipality would have greatly affected Jiangsu Province's tax revenues. Jiangsu Province and Shanghai County therefore persistently refused to agree to transfer the entire county to Shanghai. To this end, officials from relevant central government departments, the Jiangsu Provincial Government, and the Shanghai Special Municipality Government held joint discussions in Nanjing on 15–16 March 1928 (the 17th year of the Republic), and ultimately reached a consensus. The Jiangsu Provincial Government agreed to fully transfer administrative authority over 17 urban-rural areas to the Shanghai Special Municipality Government, namely: from Shanghai County—Shanghai City, Pusong Town, Yangjing Town, Yinxianggang Township, Fahua Township, Caoheqing Township, Gaohang Township, Luhang Township, Tangqiao Township, and Yansi Township; and from Baoshan County—Wusong Township, Yinxing Township, Jiangwan Township, Pengpu Township, Zhenru Township, and Gaoqiao Township. Receipt of the following areas from Shanghai County was temporarily deferred: Chenhang, Tangwan, Beiqiao, Zhuanqiao, Maqiao, Minxing, Caohang, and Sanlin townships; Zhoupu Town from Nanhui County; Qibao Township from Songjiang and Qingpu counties; Xinzhuang Township from Songjiang County; and Yanghang and Dachang townships from Baoshan County, "to be reported to the National Government and negotiated with the Jiangsu Provincial Government for transfer of administrative authority when expansion of operations makes it necessary to do so." As a result, the actual administrative area of the Shanghai Special Municipality was greatly reduced, to a total area of 494.69 square kilometres (excluding the concessions).

After the victory in the war of resistance, the Dachang Township originally belonging to Baoshan County was incorporated. In 1946 (the 35th year of the Republic), Shanghai Municipality requested that the not-yet-received urban and rural areas be transferred to its jurisdiction, but in practice this did not occur. In 1948 (the 37th year of the Republic), following multiple negotiations between Shanghai and Jiangsu, the western boundary of Shanghai Municipality south of the Suzhou Creek was defined by rivers running north–south such as the Xiaolai Tang and Zhugong.

=== Districts ===
Administrative map of Shanghai Municipality, 1948

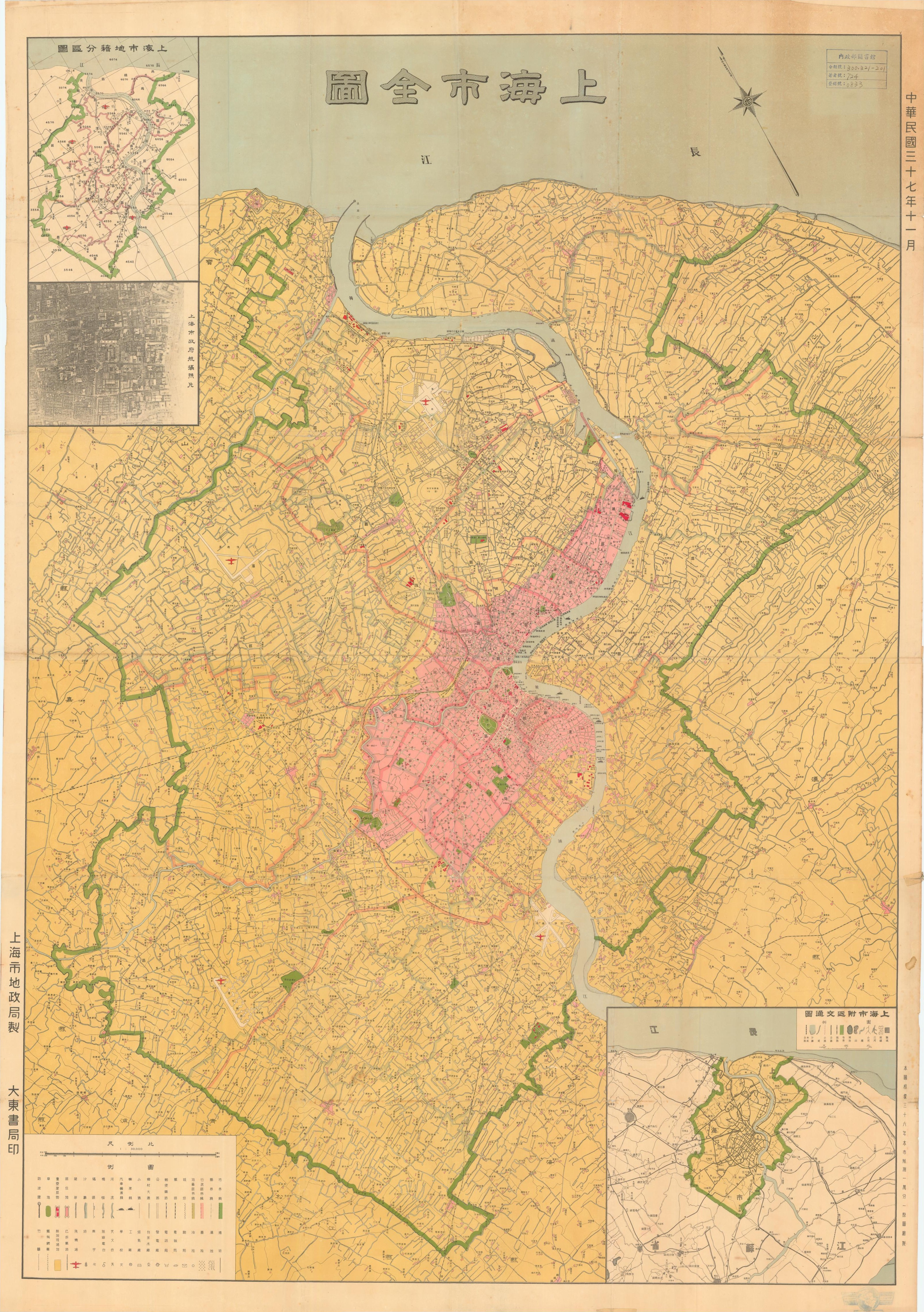
Complete Map of Shanghai Municipality, produced by the Shanghai Municipal Land Administration Bureau and printed by the Dadong Bookstore, November 1948 (the 37th year of the Republic)

The Shanghai Special Municipality was established on 7 July 1927 (the 16th year of the Republic). The Nanjing National Government had originally intended to assign to the Shanghai Special Municipality 31 townships including Dachang and Yanghang townships of Baoshan County, parts of Qibao Township shared between Songjiang and Qingpu counties, part of Xinzhuang Township in Songjiang County, part of Zhoupu Township in Nanhui County, and certain areas of Shanghai County. However, when the Shanghai Special Municipality came to take over the various townships from Jiangsu Province in July 1928 (the 17th year of the Republic), a dispute arose with the province. After mediation by the Executive Yuan, the Shanghai Special Municipality first received the following 17 urban-rural areas from Jiangsu Province: from Shanghai County—Shanghai City, Pusong Town, Yangjing Town, Yinxianggang Township, Fahua Township, Caoheqing Township, Gaohang Township, Luhang Township, Tangqiao Township, and Yansi Township; and from Baoshan County—Zhabei Town, Wusong Township, Yinxing Township, Jiangwan Township, Pengpu Township, Zhenru Township, and Gaoqiao Township. The International Settlement and French Concession were declared Special Districts. On 1 July of the following year, the 17 urban-rural areas were reorganised into districts, giving Shanghai its first district-level administrative units.

Shanghai fell in November 1937 (the 26th year of the Republic). In October 1938, the Japanese occupation authorities divided the Chinese-administered areas and the northern half of the Shanghai International Settlement into 6 districts: Nanshi, Hubei, Huxi, Pudong North, Pudong West, and City Centre. In December, Chuansha, Nanhui, Fengxian, Chongming, Baoshan, and Jiading counties of Jiangsu Province, as well as the area of Shanghai County west of the Huangpu River, were transferred to the jurisdiction of the Wang Jingwei regime's Shanghai Municipal Government. In 1943, after Britain, the United States, and France returned their concessions in Shanghai, the Shanghai Special Municipal Government reorganised the International Settlement and the French Concession as the 1st and 8th districts, reorganised the original 6 districts as the 2nd through 7th districts, and classified the sub-districts into three tiers: urban, suburban, and county. The urban area included the former concessions, Nanshi, Zhabei, and Huxi; the suburban area included Jiangwan, Zhenru, Yangjing, Pudong South, and Pudong North; and the county area included Nanhui, Fengxian, Chuansha, Jiading, Baoshan, and Chongming. The Shanghai Special Municipal Government also established 32 police districts within the urban and suburban areas.

Administrative divisions of Shanghai Municipality (1927–1937)
Code	District	District Office (before November 1937)	History
Undetermined	Hunan District	Old town area of present-day Huangpu District, Shanghai	Originally Shanghai City, Shanghai County, Jiangsu Province; transferred to the Shanghai Special Municipality in July 1927 (16th year of the Republic). Reorganised as Hunan District on 1 July 1928 (17th year of the Republic).
Undetermined	Zhabei District	Present-day Jing'an District, Shanghai	Originally Zhabei Town, Shanghai County, Jiangsu Province; transferred to the Shanghai Special Municipality in July 1927. Reorganised as Zhabei District on 1 July 1928.
Undetermined	Pusong District	Present-day Beixinjing Subdistrict, Changning District, Shanghai	Originally Pusong Town, Shanghai County, Jiangsu Province; transferred to the Shanghai Special Municipality in July 1927. Reorganised as Pusong District on 1 July 1928.
Undetermined	Yangjing District	Present-day Yangjing Subdistrict, Pudong New Area, Shanghai	Originally Yangjing Town, Shanghai County, Jiangsu Province; transferred to the Shanghai Special Municipality in July 1927. Reorganised as Yangjing District on 1 July 1928.
Undetermined	Yinxiang District	Yinxianggang neighbourhood, present-day Yangpu District, Shanghai	Location of the Municipal Government. Originally Yinxianggang Township, Shanghai County, Jiangsu Province; transferred to the Shanghai Special Municipality in July 1927. Reorganised as Yinxiang District on 1 July 1928.
Undetermined	Fahua District	Fahua area, present-day Changning District, Shanghai	Originally Fahua Township, Shanghai County, Jiangsu Province; transferred to the Shanghai Special Municipality in July 1927. Reorganised as Fahua District on 1 July 1928.
Undetermined	Caoheqing District	Caoheqing area, present-day Xuhui District, Shanghai	Originally Caoheqing Township, Shanghai County, Jiangsu Province; transferred to the Shanghai Special Municipality in July 1927. Reorganised as Caoheqing District on 1 July 1928.
Undetermined	Gaohang District	Gaohang area, present-day Pudong New Area, Shanghai	Originally Gaohang Township, Shanghai County, Jiangsu Province; transferred to the Shanghai Special Municipality in July 1927. Reorganised as Gaohang District on 1 July 1928.
Undetermined	Luhang District	Luhang area, present-day Pudong New Area, Shanghai	Originally Luhang Township, Shanghai County, Jiangsu Province; transferred to the Shanghai Special Municipality in July 1927. Reorganised as Luhang District on 1 July 1928.
Undetermined	Tangqiao District	Tangqiao area, present-day Pudong New Area, Shanghai	Originally Tangqiao Township, Shanghai County, Jiangsu Province; transferred to the Shanghai Special Municipality in July 1927. Reorganised as Tangqiao District on 1 July 1928.
Undetermined	Yansi District	Yansi area, present-day Pudong New Area, Shanghai	Originally Yansi Township, Shanghai County, Jiangsu Province; transferred to the Shanghai Special Municipality in July 1927. Reorganised as Yansi District on 1 July 1928.
Undetermined	Wusong District	Present-day Wusong Subdistrict, Baoshan District, Shanghai	Originally Wusong Township, Baoshan County, Jiangsu Province; transferred to the Shanghai Special Municipality in July 1927. Reorganised as Wusong District on 1 July 1928.
Undetermined	Yinxing District	Yinxing area, present-day Yangpu District, Shanghai	Originally Yinxing Township, Baoshan County, Jiangsu Province; transferred to the Shanghai Special Municipality in July 1927. Reorganised as Yinxing District on 1 July 1928.
Undetermined	Jiangwan District	Present-day Jiangwan Town Subdistrict, Hongkou District, Shanghai	Originally Jiangwan Township, Baoshan County, Jiangsu Province; transferred to the Shanghai Special Municipality in July 1927. Reorganised as Jiangwan District on 1 July 1928.
Undetermined	Pengpu District	Present-day Pengpu Town, Zhabei District, Shanghai	Originally Pengpu Township, Baoshan County, Jiangsu Province; transferred to the Shanghai Special Municipality in July 1927. Reorganised as Pengpu District on 1 July 1928.
Undetermined	Zhenru District	Present-day Zhenru Town, Putuo District, Shanghai	Originally Zhenru Township, Baoshan County, Jiangsu Province; transferred to the Shanghai Special Municipality in July 1927. Reorganised as Zhenru District on 1 July 1928.
Undetermined	Gaoqiao District	Present-day Gaoqiao Town, Pudong New Area, Shanghai	Originally Gaoqiao Township, Baoshan County, Jiangsu Province; transferred to the Shanghai Special Municipality in July 1927. Reorganised as Gaoqiao District on 1 July 1928.
Additionally, in 1927 (the 16th year of the Republic), the International Settlement and French Concession were designated as Special Districts.

After Shanghai was recovered in August 1945 (the 34th year of the Republic), 29 districts were established based on the jurisdictions of the original 31 police districts (the 27th District—Maqiao—and the 28th District—Tangwan—reverted to Shanghai County). The Shanghai Municipal Government also returned the various counties to Jiangsu Province's jurisdiction. The Dachang District, which had belonged to Baoshan County and which Shanghai had failed to take over smoothly in 1928 due to the presence of an airport within its boundaries, was agreed by Jiangsu Province to be assigned to Shanghai Municipality. In 1946 (the 35th year of the Republic), Zhenru District was added; this remained unchanged until May 1949 (the 38th year of the Republic).

Administrative divisions of Shanghai Municipality (1945–1949)
Code	District	Grade	Seat (before June 1949)	Notes
Undetermined	Huangpu District	A	Cishu Building, 451 East Nanjing Road, Shanghai	Established as District 1 in 1945 (34th year of the Republic); renamed Huangpu District in January 1947 (36th year) due to the district's proximity to the Huangpu River. Borders: east to the Huangpu River, south to Xin Kaihe Road/Minguo Road (today's Renmin Road), west to South Zhejiang Road/Middle Shandong Road/South Shanxi Road, north to Suzhou Creek.
Undetermined	Louza District	A	Inside the old Louza Police Station, 101 Guizhou Road	Established as District 2 in 1945; renamed Louza District in January 1947 after the old water lock (today's Fujian Road Bridge) within the district. Borders: east to South Zhejiang Road/Middle Shandong Road/South Shanxi Road, south to Zhongzheng East Road (today's East Yan'an Road), west to Tibet Middle Road, north to Suzhou Creek.
Undetermined	Yimiao District	A	116 Middle Fangbin Road → Qingxuetang, Yu Garden → Guan Di Temple, East Fuxing Road → Guangfu Temple, Fangbin Road	Established as District 3 in 1945; renamed Yimiao District in January 1947 after the City God Temple within the district. Borders: east to the Huangpu River, south to Laobai Ferry Road/East Fuxing Road, west to Zhonghua Road/Minguo Road, north to Minguo Road/Xin Kaihe Road.
Undetermined	Penglai District	A	121 Penglai Road (former Customs Office) → 285 Wangjia Wharf Road	Established as District 4 in 1945; renamed Penglai District in January 1947 after Penglai Road within the district. Borders: east to the Huangpu River, south to the Huangpu River, west to No. 6 Road/Gaoxiong Road/Zhaozhoupu Road/West Tibet South Road, north to West Fangbin Road/Zhonghua Road/East Fuxing Road/Laobai Ferry Road.
Undetermined	Songshan District	A	Songshan area, present-day Huangpu District, Shanghai	Established as District 5 in 1945; renamed Taishan District in January 1947 after Taishan Road (today's Dongtai Road) within the district, then shortly after renamed Songshan District after Songshan Road within the district. Borders: east to South Zhejiang Road/Minguo Road/West Fangbin Road/Tibet South Road/Zhaozhoupu Road/Zhazhuju Road/Gaoxiong Road/No. 6 Road, south to the Huangpu River, west to Ping'an Road/Luban Road/South Chongqing Road/Middle Chongqing Road, north to Zhongzheng East Road.
Undetermined	Lujiawan District	A	Lujiawan area, present-day Huangpu District, Shanghai	Established as District 6 in 1945; renamed Lujiawan District in January 1947 after Lujiawan within the district. Borders: east to Middle Chongqing Road/South Chongqing Road/Luban Road/Ping'an Road, south to the Huangpu River, west to Rihui Harbour/East Rihui Road/west section of Xujiahui Road (today's Zhaojiabang Road)/South Shaanxi Road, north to Zhongzheng Middle Road.
Undetermined	Changshu District	A	Changshu area, present-day Xuhui District, Shanghai	Established as District 7 in 1945; renamed Changshu District in January 1947 after Changshu Road within the district. Borders: east to South Shaanxi Road/west section of Xujiahui Road/East Rihui Road/Rihui Harbour, south to the Huangpu River/Longhua Harbour, west to Jinji Road (today's South Wanping Road)/Wanping Road/Xingguo Road, north to Huashan Road/Changle Road.
Undetermined	Xujiahui District	B	Present-day Xuhui District, Shanghai	Established as District 8 in 1945; renamed Xujiahui District in January 1947 after Xujiahui within the district. Borders: east to Wanping Road/Jinji Road, south to today's Huarong Road/West Longhua Road, west to the Hu-Hang Railway, north to Linsen West Road (today's West Huaihai Road).
Undetermined	Facao District	A	Present-day Changning District, Shanghai	Established as District 9 in 1945; renamed Changning District in January 1947 after Fahua Town and Caojia Du (ferry crossing) within the district. Renamed Facao District in September 1948 (37th year of the Republic). Borders: east to Changning Road/Jiangsu Road/Xingguo Road, south to Linsen West Road, west to the Hu-Hang Railway, north to Suzhou Creek.
Undetermined	Jing'an District	A	792 Yuyuan Road	Established as District 10 in 1945; renamed Jing'an District in January 1947 after Jing'an Temple within the district. Borders: east to Taixing Road/North Maoming Road, south to Zhongzheng Middle Road/Changle Road/Huashan Road, west to Jiangsu Road, north to Kaiyuan Road (today's West Wuding Road)/Fanwang Ferry Road (today's Wanhangdu Road)/Xinzha Road.
Undetermined	Xincheng District	A	360 North Chengdu Road	Established as District 11 in 1945; renamed Xincheng District in January 1947 after Xinzha Road and Chengdu Road within the district. Borders: east to Tibet Middle Road, south to Zhongzheng East Road/Middle Chongqing Road/Zhongzheng Middle Road, west to North Maoming Road/Taixing Road, north to Suzhou Creek.
Undetermined	Jiangning District	A	511 Jiangning Road	Established as District 12 in 1945; renamed Jiangning District in January 1947 after Jiangning Road within the district. Borders: east to Suzhou Creek/Taixing Road, south to Xinzha Road/Fanwang Ferry Road/Kaiyuan Road, west to Changning Road/Changshou Road, north to Anyuan Road.
Undetermined	Putuo District	A	Buddhist Studies Institute, Yufo Chan Temple, Anyuan Road	Established as District 13 in 1945; renamed Putuo District in January 1947 after Putuo Road within the district. Borders: east to Suzhou Creek, south to Anyuan Road/Changshou Road, west to Suzhou Creek, north to Suzhou Creek.
Undetermined	Zhabei District	A	Present-day Zhabei District, Shanghai	Established as District 14 in 1945; renamed Zhabei District in January 1947 after the new water lock (today's Xinzha Bridge) adjacent to the district. Borders: east to Songgong Park Road (today's northern section of North Tibet Road)/North Tibet Road, south to Suzhou Creek, west to Suzhou Creek, north to North Zhongshan Road.
Undetermined	Beizhan District	A	Beizhan area, present-day Zhabei District, Shanghai	Established as District 15 in 1945; renamed Beizhan District in January 1947 after Shanghai Station (today's Shanghai North Station) within the district. Borders: east to Baoxing Road (today's East Baoxing Road)/Songhu Railway/North Henan Road, south to Suzhou Creek, west to North Tibet Road/Songgong Park Road, north to North Zhongshan Road.
Undetermined	Hongkou District	A	181 Minxing Road	Established as District 16 in 1945; renamed Hongkou District in January 1947 after Hongkou Harbour adjacent to the district. Borders: east to Hongkou Harbour, south to Suzhou Creek, west to North Henan Road/Songhu Railway, north to Yuqing Creek.
Undetermined	North Sichuan Road District	B	1172 Liyang Road	Established as District 17 in 1945; renamed North Sichuan Road District in January 1947 after North Sichuan Road (i.e., North Sichuan Road) within the district. Borders: east to Shajing Harbour, south to Yuqing Creek, west to Baoxing Road/West Baoxing Road/North Baoxing Road/Yuqing Creek, north to around today's East Wenshui Road/Shuidian Road (eastern section of today's East Wenshui Road).
Undetermined	Tilanqiao District	A	25 Pingliang Road	Established as District 18 in 1945; renamed Tilanqiao District in January 1947 after Tilanqiao within the district. Borders: east to Dalian Road/Qinhuangdao Road, south to the Huangpu River, west to Hongkou Harbour/Shajing Harbour/Shahong Harbour (today's East Shahong Road), north to Xingang (today's Xingang Road).
Undetermined	Yulin District	A	Yongye Li, Fulu Street, Pingliang Road	Established as District 19 in 1945; renamed Yulin District in January 1947 after Yulin Road within the district. Borders: east to Yangshupu Creek, south to the Huangpu River, west to Qinhuangdao Road/Dalian Road, north to around today's Kongjiang Road/Benxi Road.
Undetermined	Yangshupu District	A	1551 Linqing Road	Established as District 20 in 1945; renamed Yangshupu District in January 1947 after Yangshupu Creek adjacent to the district. Borders: east to the Huangpu River, south to the Huangpu River, west to Yangshupu Creek, north to around Changyang Road/Longchang Road/Hejian Road/today's Aiguo Road/Zhoujiazui Road/Fuxing Island Canal.
Undetermined	Xinshi Street District	B	Taiwan Bank, Xieye Road (Guoquan Road intersection), Qimei Road (today's Siping Road)	Established as District 21 in 1945; renamed Xinshi Street District in January 1947 because the district had been the core of the Greater Shanghai Plan. Roughly corresponds to the central part of today's Yangpu District and the eastern part of Hongkou District.
Undetermined	Jiangwan District	B	Dai residence, Kuizhao Road, Jiangwan Town	Established as District 22 in 1945; renamed Jiangwan District in January 1947. Roughly corresponds to the northern part of today's Yangpu District, the northern part of Hongkou District, the Linfen Road area of Jing'an District, and Gaojing in Baoshan District.
Undetermined	Wusong District	B	45 Guizhi Road, Wusong Town → 23 Songxing Road, Wusong Town	Established as District 23 in 1945; renamed Wusong District in January 1947. Roughly corresponds to the Wusong and Songnan areas of today's Baoshan District.
Undetermined	Dachang District	B	Present-day Dachang Town, Baoshan District, Shanghai	Established as District 24 in 1945; renamed Dachang District in January 1947. Roughly corresponds to the northern part of today's Jing'an District, Ganquan Road in Putuo District, and Dachang, Miaohang, and Zhangmiao in Baoshan District.
Undetermined	Xinjing District	B	15 Da Jinjia Lane, Gubei Road	Established as District 25 in 1945; renamed Xinjing District in January 1947. Roughly corresponds to most of today's Changning District, Xinhong and Huacao in Minhang District, and Jiangqiao in Jiading District.
Undetermined	Longhua District	B	3, Lane 177, Longhua Town	Established as District 26 in 1945; renamed Longhua District in January 1947. Roughly corresponds to most of today's Xuhui District and Xinzhuang, Qibao, Hongqiao, and Meilong in Minhang District.
Undetermined	Yansi District	B	South Street, Yansi Town	Established as District 29 in 1945; renamed Yansi District in January 1947. Roughly corresponds to the Shanggang New Village, Zhoujiadu, South Wharf Road, Tangqiao, and Qiantan areas of today's Pudong New Area.
Undetermined	Yangjing District	A	Laiyidu Pawnshop Lane, Pudong	Established as District 30 in 1945; renamed Yangjing District in January 1947. Roughly corresponds to the Lujiazui, Linyi New Village, Yangjing, Jinyang New Village, Puxing Road, and Jinqiao areas of today's Pudong New Area.
Undetermined	Gaoqiao District	B	West Market, Gaoqiao Town, Shanghai	Established as District 31 in 1945; renamed Gaoqiao District in January 1947. Roughly corresponds to the Gaoqiao, Gaodong, Gaohang, and Hudong New Village areas of today's Pudong New Area.
Undetermined	Zhenru District	A	Present-day Zhenru Town, Putuo District, Shanghai	Established as District 32 in 1946 (35th year of the Republic) by splitting off areas from Dachang and Xinjing districts; renamed Zhenru District in January 1947. Roughly corresponds to most of today's Putuo District and the Xinzhen area of Jiading District.

== Population ==
Historical population of Shanghai Municipality
Year	Pop.	±%
1932	3,133,782	—
1933	3,404,435	+8.6%
1934	3,572,792	+4.9%
1935	3,701,982	+3.6%
1936	3,914,315	+5.7%
1945	3,370,230	−13.9%
1946	3,830,039	+13.6%
1947	4,494,390	+17.3%
1948	5,448,466	+21.2%

From the 2nd year of Xuantong (1910) to the 16th year of the Republic (1927), Shanghai's population grew from approximately 1.289 million to over 2.641 million, an average annual growth rate of 4.3%. At the same time, population mobility was active, as large numbers of people gathered in Shanghai, and the city rapidly developed into the largest city in the country. After the August 13 Incident in 1937 (the 26th year of the Republic), a second large-scale wave of migration from other regions to Shanghai occurred. Shanghai's population grew from 3.852 million in 1937 (the 26th year of the Republic) to 3.920 million in 1942 (the 31st year of the Republic).

Population of Shanghai Municipality (1945)
District	Households	Population		
District	Households	Male	Female	Total
Huangpu District	20,294	83,088	28,962	112,050
Laozha District	24,866	82,014	47,676	129,690
Xincheng District	53,785	155,487	146,650	302,137
Jing'an District	27,274	83,446	85,149	168,595
Jiangning District	37,290	108,646	94,214	202,860
Putuo District	23,640	53,195	45,633	98,828
Taishan District	63,313	165,613	153,240	318,853
Lujiawan District	26,940	72,784	71,158	143,942
Changshu District	22,317	90,833	33,224	124,057
Changning District	24,511	66,256	56,114	122,370
Xujiahui District	12,806	35,982	32,669	68,651
Yimiao District	32,041	77,647	66,847	144,494
Penglai District	41,048	91,378	85,358	176,736
Xinshi Street District	4,266	10,904	10,533	21,437
Zhabei District	21,440	34,551	27,950	62,501
Yangshupu District	12,944	33,850	32,108	65,958
Yulin District	84,783	66,617	58,127	124,744
Tilanqiao District	26,133	77,259	61,755	139,014
Hongkou District	19,225	57,905	45,453	103,358
North Sichuan Road District	6,627	23,841	15,267	39,108
Beizhan District	33,191	84,406	69,978	154,384
Jiangwan District	9,079	20,939	19,971	40,910
Longhua District	3,127	8,107	6,775	14,882
Xinjing District	23,593	42,252	39,347	81,599
Dachang District	12,922	36,311	29,633	65,944
Gaoqiao District	22,792	46,638	47,653	94,291
Yansi District	14,821	28,588	30,672	59,260
Yangjing District	34,888	99,708	90,865	190,573
Total	739,956	1,838,245	1,532,981	3,371,226

After the victory in the Second Sino-Japanese War in 1945 (the 34th year of the Republic), most residents returned to their hometowns and Shanghai's population declined. Following the outbreak of the civil war, a third large-scale wave of migration from other regions to Shanghai occurred. Statistics released by the Bureau of Statistics of the Executive Yuan's Directorate-General of Budgets, Accounts and Statistics of the National Government in 1948 (the 37th year of the Republic) put Shanghai's population at 4,300,630. Shanghai's population grew from over 3.3 million at the time of victory in the war of resistance to over 5.4 million at the beginning of 1949 (the 38th year of the Republic).

Historical population of Shanghai Municipality

Population of Shanghai Municipality (1932–1934)
Year	1932			1933			1934		
Nationality District	Chinese	Foreign	Total	Chinese	Foreign	Total	Chinese	Foreign	Total
Direct-controlled urban area	1,571,089	9,347	1,580,436	1,786,622	9,331	1,795,953	1,914,694	11,084	1,925,778
First Special District	1,030,554	44,240	1,074,794	1,065,554	46,392	1,111,946	1,100,496	48,325	1,148,821
Second Special District	462,342	16,210	478,552	478,755	17,781	496,536	479,294	18,899	498,193
Total	3,063,985	69,797	3,133,782	3,330,931	73,504	3,404,435	3,494,484	78,308	3,572,792

Population of Shanghai Municipality (1935–1936)
Year	1935			1936		
Nationality District	Chinese	Foreign	Total	Chinese	Foreign	Total
Direct-controlled urban area	2,032,399	11,615	2,044,014	2,145,317	10,400	2,155,717
First Special District	1,120,860	38,915	1,159,775	1,241,727	39,242	1,280,969
Second Special District	479,294	18,899	498,193	454,231	23,398	477,629
Total	3,632,553	69,429	3,701,982	3,841,275	73,040	3,914,315

Note: Population figures for the direct-controlled urban area from the 21st year of the Republic (1932) to the 25th year (1936) are based on the annual September population survey reports of the Shanghai Municipal Government's Public Security Bureau. The First Special District is the former International Settlement; figures for the 19th year (1930) and the 24th year (1935) are based on direct surveys, while the remaining five years are estimates. For the Second Special District (the former French Concession), the 24th year (1935) was not surveyed, so the figures in the table retain those from the 23rd year (1934).

Population of Shanghai Municipality (1945–1947)
Year	Bao units	Jia units	Households	Population		
Year	Bao units	Jia units	Households	Total	Male	Female
1945	2,115	26,430	739,956	3,370,230	1,837,245	1,532,985
1946	1,056	25,144	759,361	3,830,039	2,149,578	1,680,461
1947	1,088	26,605	884,443	4,494,390	2,487,595	2,006,795

The Ministry of the Interior's Household Registration Department's 1990 (the 79th year of the Republic)

household and housing census report recorded 31,182 people of Shanghai Municipality origin in the Taiwan and Fujian area, representing 1.15% of the 2,694,917 non-Taiwan Province natives.

== Politics ==
=== Municipal government ===
Municipal administrative structure

On 22 March 1927 (the 16th year of the Republic), the second session of the Shanghai Citizens' Representative Assembly elected the Provisional Government of the Shanghai Special Municipality. Niou Yung-chien, Bai Chongxi, Yang Xingfo, Wang Xiaolai, and Wang Shouhua were elected as the five Standing Committee members. The Municipal Government was subordinate to the Wuhan National Government, and was approved by resolution of the KMT Central Political Council in Hankou on the 25th of the same month. On 29 March, the Municipal Government Committee held its inauguration ceremony and formally established the provisional government. On 12 April, Chiang Kai-shek launched the party purge, forcing the Provisional Municipal Government of the Shanghai Special Municipality to cease operations; it was closed down on 14 April. The KMT Shanghai Provisional Political Committee took control of Shanghai's municipal government.

On 7 May, the 89th meeting of the KMT Central Political Council resolved to pass and promulgate the Provisional Regulations of the Shanghai Special Municipality. The Regulations stipulated that Shanghai would be a special municipality under the direct jurisdiction of the central government, outside the provincial and county administrative hierarchy, with a status equivalent to a province. The Municipal Government comprised one mayor, several counsellors, and ten bureaux under it: Finance, Public Works, Public Security, Health, Public Utilities, Education, Land, Port, Agriculture, Industry and Commerce, and Public Welfare. On 18 May, the National Government appointed Huang Fu as Mayor of the Shanghai Special Municipality. On 7 July, the Shanghai Special Municipality Government was inaugurated. On 27 June 1930 (the 19th year of the Republic), in accordance with the Organic Law of Municipalities, the Shanghai Special Municipality was reorganised as Shanghai Municipality under the direct jurisdiction of the Executive Yuan; apart from the Port Bureau (whose establishment was deferred by order and abolished at the end of December), the names of all other bureaux and departments remained unchanged.

Shanghai fell in November 1937 (the 26th year of the Republic). In August 1945 (the 34th year of the Republic), Shanghai was recovered, and the Municipal Government was re-established on 12 September. The mayor took up his post on 14 August, and the government comprised 8 bureaux—Police, Finance, Social Affairs, Education, Health, Public Works, Public Utilities, and Land Administration—as well as 6 offices: Secretariat, Personnel, General Affairs, Finance (renamed Accounting Office on 12 November), Investigation (added 1 November), and Civil Administration (added 5 November), along with the Counsellors' Office and Confidential Office, for a total of 4 offices and 6 rooms in the main headquarters. In January 1946 (the 35th year of the Republic), a Statistics Office was added; in April, the Research Office formerly under the Secretariat was placed under the direct leadership of the Secretary-General, and an External Affairs Office was also added; in June, the Inspection Office was abolished. In August, a News Office was added and the Translation Office previously under the Secretariat was abolished, with its functions transferred to the News Office. In October 1947 (the 36th year of the Republic), the Civil Administration Office was upgraded to a Civil Administration Bureau. By this point the Municipal Government's organisational structure was essentially settled, comprising 9 bureaux, 7 offices, and 4 rooms. On 27 November, the Executive Yuan promulgated the Organic Regulations of the Shanghai Municipal Government, with the Municipal Government subordinate to the Executive Yuan, comprising one mayor, one secretary-general, six counsellors, and nine bureaux including the Civil Administration Bureau. The Municipal Government ceased to exist in late May 1949 (the 38th year of the Republic) with the withdrawal of the Nationalist forces.

Mayors

Mayors of the Shanghai Special Municipality Government

- Huang Fu (7 July 1927 – 14 August 1927)
- Wu Zhenxiu (15 August 1927 – 16 September 1927, Municipal Government Secretary-General acting as Mayor)
- Zhang Dingfan (17 September 1927 – 31 March 1929)
- Zhang Qun (1 April 1929 – 29 June 1930)

Mayors of the Shanghai Municipal Government

- Zhang Qun (1 July 1930 – 6 January 1932)
- Wu Tiecheng (7 January 1932 – 31 March 1937)
- Yu Hung-chun (1 April 1937 – 12 November 1937; acting until 26 July)
- Qian Dajun (12 September 1945 – 19 May 1946)
- Wu Kuo-chen (20 May 1946 – 30 April 1949)
- Chen Liang (1 April 1949 – 24 May 1949; acting as mayor in his capacity as Secretary-General of the Shanghai Municipal Government until 30 April)
- Zhao Zukang (24 May 1949 – 28 May 1949; acting as mayor in his capacity as Director of the Shanghai Municipal Public Works Bureau)

Public housing policy

In 1928, the Shanghai Special Municipality Government's council resolved to build public housing, forming a "Committee for the Construction of Public Housing." By 1931, three public housing projects had been completed. The first public housing estate was located on Quanjia'an Road (today's North Linping Road), covering 22.863 mu (15,242 square metres), with 94 single-storey brick-and-timber units. The second estate was located at No. 628 Lane, Xietu Road, covering 23.998 mu (15,993 square metres). The third estate was located on Jiaotong Road, covering 15.543 mu (10,362 square metres).

In April 1935, the Shanghai Special Municipality Government established the "Shanghai Municipal Civic Welfare Committee", and subsequently built additional public housing at Qimei Road (today's Siping Road) covering 39.452 mu (26,301.3 sq m), Pushan Road covering 48.595 mu (32,396.6 sq m), Damu Bridge Road covering 22.725 mu (15,150 sq m), and Zhongshan Road covering 34,963 sq m; these public housing estates were named "people's villages" (Pingmin Cun). These housing estates were severely damaged during the Second Sino-Japanese War. After the war ended, the Shanghai authorities raised 1.55 billion fabi (legal tender) to fund expansion.

In September 1946, the Shanghai Municipal Public Works Bureau formulated the "Second Phase Public Housing Construction Plan", proposing to build 3,000 housing units of various types. The expansion plan was ultimately not implemented.

== See also ==
- History of Shanghai
- Shanghai
- Shanghai Municipal People's Government

== Bibliography ==
- 鄭寶恆 (2001). 民國時期政區沿革 [Evolution of Administrative Regions During the Republican Period] (in Chinese). 湖北教育出版社. ISBN 9787535126610.
- 傅林祥, 鄭寶恒 (2007). 中國行政區劃通史‧中華民國卷 [General History of Chinese Administrative Divisions: Republic of China Volume] (in Chinese). Shanghai: 復旦大學出版社. ISBN 9787309056044.
- National History Institute Geography Gazetteer Compilation Committee (1990). 中華民國史地理志（初稿） [Geographical Gazetteer of the History of the Republic of China (Draft)] (in Traditional Chinese). Taipei: Academia Historica. ISBN 9579042020.
- Surveys Department, Joint Logistics Command (1970). 《中華民國分省地圖》 [Provincial Maps of the Republic of China] (in Traditional Chinese). Ministry of National Defense Intelligence Deputy Chief of Staff Office.
