= Shanghai Commune =

Shanghai Commune may mean:

- Shanghai Commune of 1927, established through a workers movement organized by the Chinese Communist Party
- Shanghai People's Commune, established during the Cultural Revolution
