= Oriental Library =

Oriental Library may refer to:

- Bibliothèque orientale, a 1697 encyclopedic work by Barthélemy d'Herbelot
- Bibliothèque Orientale (Saint Joseph University), a research library in Beirut, Lebanon
- Tōyō Bunko, a library in Tokyo, Japan
- Oriental Library, Shanghai, a former library in Shanghai, China

== See also ==
- Government Oriental Library (disambiguation)
