= Zhu Zhongming =

Chinese politician

- 朱忠明

Mayor of Shanghai
- Incumbent
- Assumed office 4 September 2026; Acting until 30 September 2026
- Preceded by: Gong Zheng

Deputy Party Secretary of Shanghai
- Incumbent
- Assumed office July 2024
- Secretary: Chen Jining

Secretary of the Political and Legal Affairs Commission of the Shanghai Party Municipal Committee
- In office August 2024 – August 2026
- Preceded by: Wu Qing

Vice Governor of Hunan
- In office April 2020 – July 2021
- Governor: Xu Dazhe; Mao Weiming

Personal details
- Born: April 1972 (age 54) Haining, Jiaxing, Zhejiang, China
- Party: Chinese Communist Party
- Education: Wuhan University; Zhejiang University; Central Party School

Zhu Zhongming (Chinese: 朱忠明; pinyin: Zhū Zhōngmíng; born April 1972) is a Chinese politician who is currently the mayor of Shanghai, deputy secretary of the Shanghai Municipal Committee of the Chinese Communist Party, and secretary of the Party Leadership Group of the Shanghai Municipal People's Government.

He graduated from the Department of Finance and Auditing, School of Economics, Wuhan University, with a bachelor's degree and a master's degree in public administration. He previously served as a member of the Chinese Communist Party (CCP) Hunan Leadership Group and Vice Governor of Hunan, a member of the Party Leadership Group of the Ministry of Finance and Vice Minister of Finance, and Secretary of the Political and Legal Affairs Commission of the Shanghai Municipal Committee of the Chinese Communist Party.

== Early life and education ==
Zhu was born in April 1972 in Haining, Zhejiang province. After graduating from the Department of Finance and Auditing, School of Economics, Wuhan University in 1993, majoring in Auditing, he joined the Zhejiang Provincial Department of Finance, rising to the position of deputy director. During this time, he pursued part-time studies in public administration at the School of Economics, Zhejiang University, earning a Master of Public Administration degree, and also participated in the training program for young and middle-aged cadres at the Central Party School.

== Political career ==
In January 2012, he was transferred to the position of Vice Mayor of Wenzhou Municipal People's Government. In August 2012, he became a member of the Standing Committee of the Wenzhou Municipal Committee of the Chinese Communist Party and Secretary of the Party Committee of the Oujiangkou New Area Development and Construction Management Committee. In July 2015, he became Deputy Secretary of the Party Group and deputy director of the Zhejiang Provincial Audit Department. In April 2017, he was promoted to Secretary of the Party Group and Director of the Zhejiang Provincial Audit Department. From March to July 2018, he studied at the training program for young and middle-aged cadres at the Central Party School . In January 2020, he was reassigned as Secretary of the Party Group and Director of the Zhejiang Provincial Department of Finance.

In April 2020, he was promoted to a member of the Party Leadership Group and Vice Governor of the Hunan Provincial People's Government. In July 2021, he went to Beijing to serve as a member of the Party Leadership Group and Vice Minister of the Ministry of Finance. In July 2024, he was transferred to the Shanghai Municipal Committee of the Chinese Communist Party as a member, standing committee member and deputy secretary. In August of the same year, he also served as secretary of the Political and Legal Affairs Commission of the Municipal Committee.

On 29 August 2026, he was promoted to Secretary of the Party Group of Shanghai Municipal People's Government. On 4 September 2026, he was appointed Vice Mayor and Acting Mayor of Shanghai Municipal People's Government, and promoted to the ministerial level. On 30 September 2026, he was elected the Mayor of Shanghai.
