= Shanghai Municipal People's Government =

Local government of Shanghai

Shanghai Municipal People's Government 上海市人民政府

Leadership
- Mayor: Zhu Zhongming since 4 September 2026
- Deputy Mayors: Zhang Xiaohong, Liu Duo, Hua Yuan, Jie Dong (CNDCA), Zhang Yahong, Chen Jie, Chen Yujian
- Secretary-general: Ma Chunlei
- Parent body: Central People's Government; Shanghai Municipal People's Congress
- Elected by: Shanghai Municipal People's Congress

Meeting place
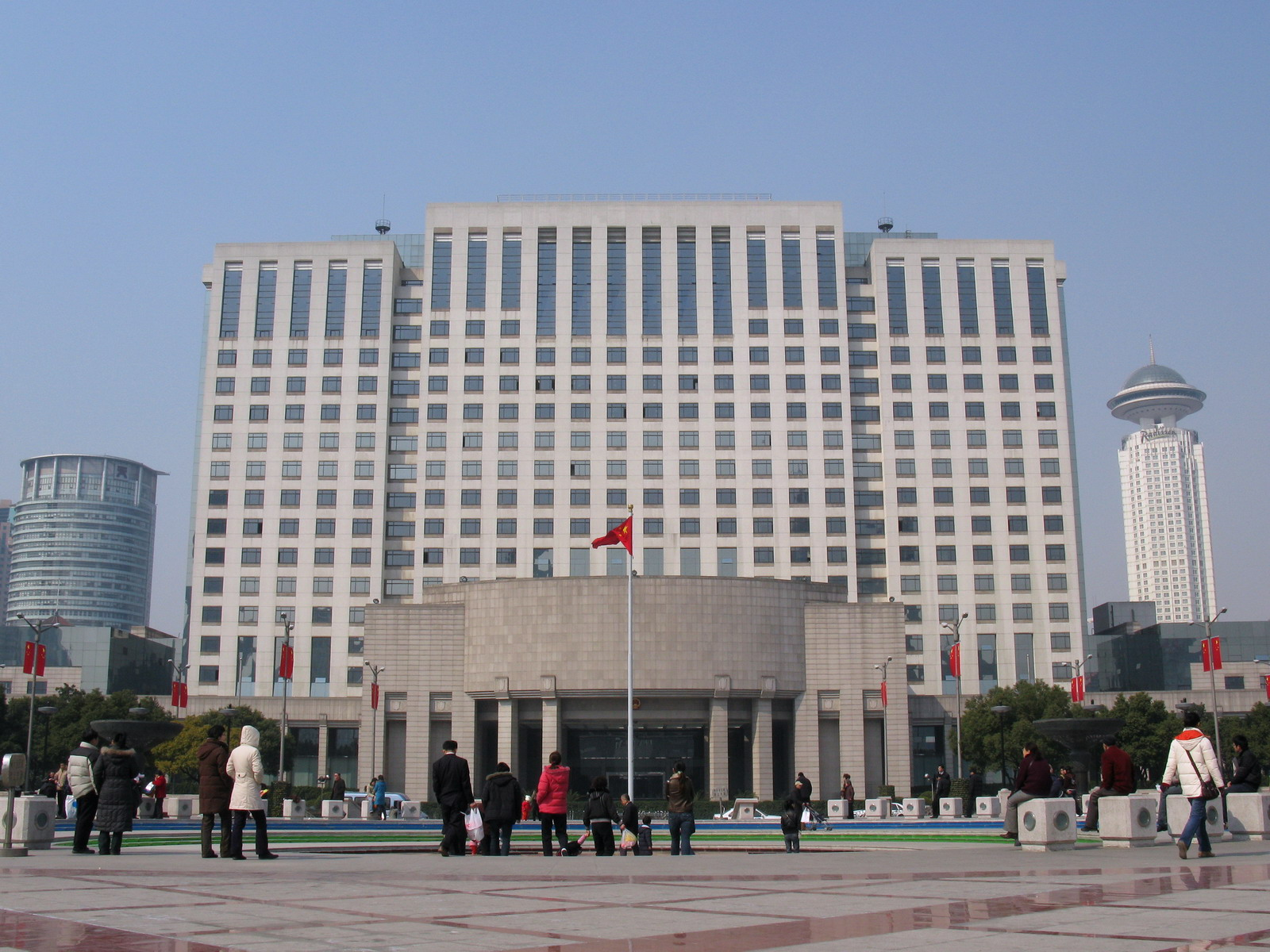
- Shanghai People's Building, Renmin Avenue Huangpu, Shanghai

Website
- www.shanghai.gov.cn

The Shanghai Municipal People's Government is the local administrative agency of Shanghai. It is officially elected by the Shanghai Municipal People's Congress and is formally responsible to the SMPC and its Standing Committee. The municipal government is headed by a mayor, currently Zhu Zhongming. Under the country's Leninist system, the mayor is subordinate to the secretary of the Shanghai Municipal Committee of the Chinese Communist Party.

== Organization ==
The organization of the Shanghai Municipal People's Government includes:

- General Office of the Shanghai Municipal People's Government

=== Component Departments ===
- Shanghai Municipal Development and Reform Commission
- Shanghai Municipal Industry and Information Technology Commission
- Shanghai Municipal Commerce Commission
- Shanghai Municipal Education Commission
- Shanghai Municipal Science and Technology Commission
- Shanghai Municipal Ethnic Affairs Bureau
- Shanghai Municipal Public Security Bureau
- Shanghai Municipal Civil Affairs Bureau
- Shanghai State Security Bureau
- Shanghai Municipal Justice Bureau
- Shanghai Municipal Finance Bureau
- Shanghai Municipal Human Resources and Social Security Bureau
- Shanghai Municipal Housing and Urban-Rural Development Committee
- Shanghai Municipal Transport Commission
- Shanghai Municipal Agriculture and Rural Affairs Committee
- Shanghai Municipal Ecology and Environment Bureau
- Shanghai Municipal Planning and Natural Resources Bureau
- Shanghai Municipal Water Resources Bureau
- Shanghai Municipal Health Commission
- Shanghai Municipal Audit Bureau
- Shanghai Municipal Culture and Tourism Bureau
- Shanghai Municipal Veterans Affairs Bureau
- Shanghai Municipal Emergency Management Bureau
- Shanghai Municipal Market Regulation Administration
- Shanghai Municipal Local Financial Supervision Administration
- Shanghai Municipal People's Government Foreign Affairs Office
- Shanghai Municipal Prison Administration
- Shanghai Municipal Cultural Development Foundation

=== Organizations under the Municipal Government ===
- Shanghai Library
- Shanghai Museum
- Shanghai Academy of Social Sciences

== Leadership ==
Name	Office	Party	Date of birth	Other offices	Ref.
Zhu Zhongming	Mayor; Secretary of the Municipal Government Party Leading Group	CCP	March 1960 (age 66)	Deputy Secretary of the Party Shanghai Municipal Committee; Member of the CCP Central Committee	
Zhang Xiaohong	Deputy Mayor; Member of the Party Leading Group	CCP	March 1968 (age 58)		
Liu Duo	Deputy Mayor; Member of the Party Leading Group	CCP	April 1966 (age 60)	Director of Shanghai Office for Promotion of Technology and Innovation Center Construction; Director of Zhangjiang Hi-tech Park Administration	
Hua Yuan	Deputy Mayor; Deputy Secretary-General; Member of the Party Leading Group	CCP	May 1974 (age 52)	Secretary of the Party Leadership Group of the Shanghai Municipal Development and Reform Commission; Director of the Shanghai Municipal Development and Reform Commission	
Xie Dong	Deputy Mayor	CNDCA	February 1971 (age 55)	Vice Chairperson of the CNDCA; Chairperson of the Shanghai Municipal Committee of the CNDCA; Director of the Shanghai Municipal Financial Supervision Bureau; Director of the Shanghai Financial Affairs Bureau	
Zhang Yahong	Deputy Mayor; Member of the Party Leading Group	CCP	July 1968 (age 58)	Deputy Secretary of the Shanghai Municipal Public Security Committee; Director of the Shanghai Public Security Bureau	
Chen Jie	Deputy Mayor; Member of the Party Leading Group	CCP	April 1969 (age 57)		
Chen Yujian	Deputy Mayor; Member of the Party Leading Group	CCP	February 1970 (age 56)	President of Shanghai Red Cross Society; CPC Secretary of Minhang	
Wu Wei	Deputy Mayor; Member of the Party Leading Group	CCP	August 1969 (age 57)		
Ma Chunlei	Secretary-General; Member of the Party Leading Group	CCP	July 1966 (age 60)	Deputy Secretary-general of the Party Shanghai Municipal Committee	

=== Previous leaderships ===
15th Municipal People's Government (January 2018–January 2023)

- Mayor: Ying Yong (until 23 March 2020), Gong Zheng (from 21 July 2020)
- Deputy Mayors: Zhou Bo (until 28 March 2019), Chen Yin (19 January 2019–31 October 2021), Weng Tiehui (until 16 January 2019), Guang Guanghui (until 22 November 2018), Wu Qing, Xu Kunlin (until 27 October 2020), Peng Chenlei, Chen Qun, Gong Daoan (until 23 September 2020), Zong Ming (from 19 February 2019), Tang Zhiping (23 September 2019 – 29 December 2021), Gong Zheng (23 March 2020 – 21 July 2020; became mayor), Chen Tong (18 August 2020 – 21 July 2022), Shu Qing (from 30 December 2020), Zhang Wei (26 February 2021 – 8 January 2023), Liu Duo (from 29 December 2021), Guo Fang (from 8 January 2023), Zhang Xiaohong (from 8 January 2023)

16th Municipal People's Government (January 2023–)

- Mayor: Gong Zheng
- Deputy Mayors: Wu Qing (until 25 July 2023), Guo Fang (until 25 July 2023), Zhang Xiaohong, Liu Duo, Hua Yuan, Xie Dong, Li Zheng (until 25 July 2023), Zhang Yahong, Chen Jie (from 25 July 2023), Chen Yujian (from 28 December 2023)
