= Shanghai Municipal Committee of the Chinese Communist Party =

Shanghai Municipal Committee of the Chinese Communist Party 中国共产党上海市委员会

Overview
- Type: Highest decision-making organ when Shanghai Municipal Congress is not in session.
- Elected by: Shanghai Municipal Congress
- Length of term: Five years
- Term limits: None
- First convocation: 15 December 1921
- Secretary: Chen Jining
- Deputy Secretary: Zhu Zhongming (Mayor)
- Secretary-General: Hua Yuan
- Executive organ: Standing Committee
- Inspection organ: Commission for Discipline Inspection

Meeting place
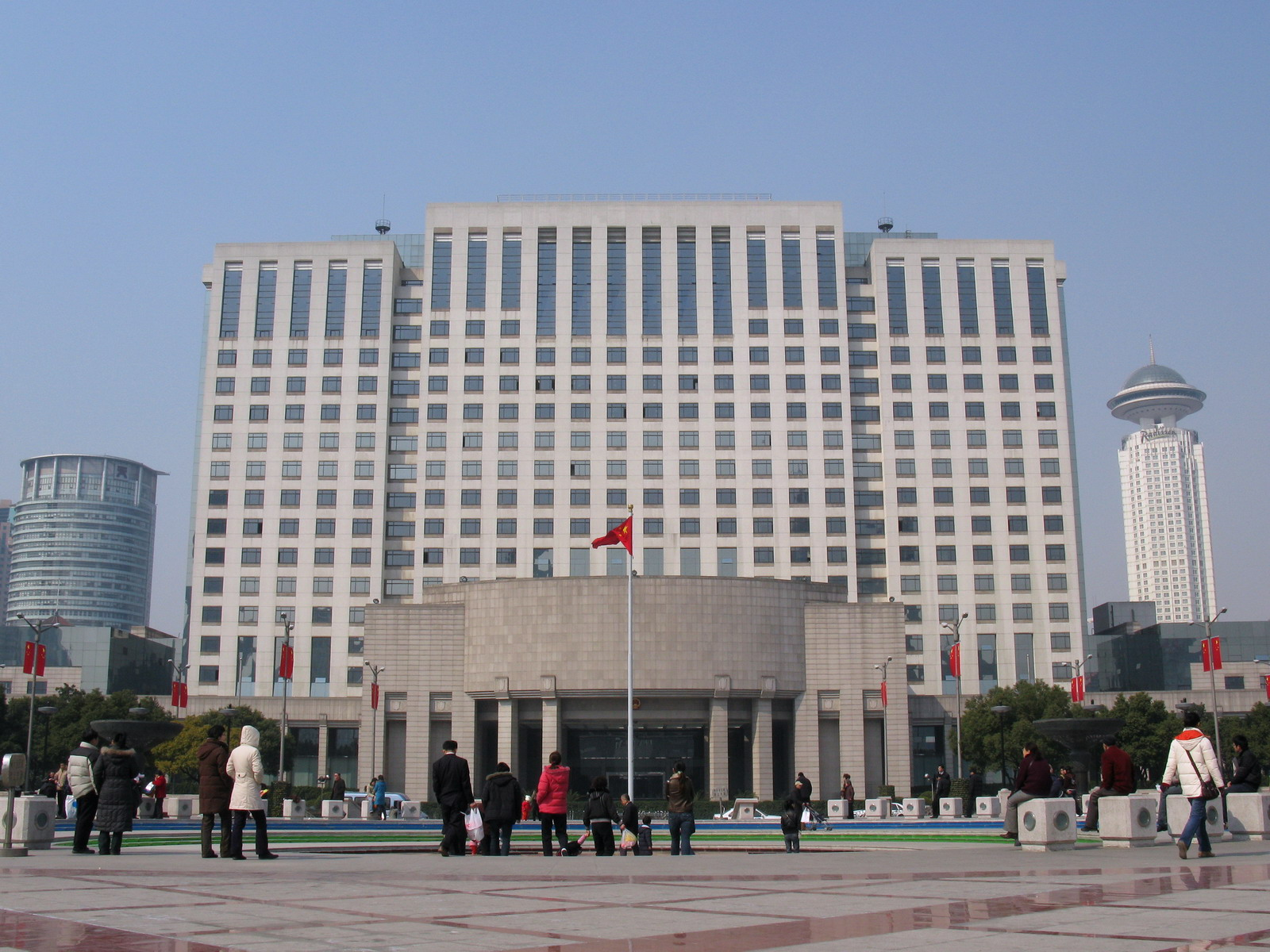
- 200 Renmin Avenue, Huangpu District, Shanghai

Shanghai Municipal Committee of the Chinese Communist Party
- Simplified Chinese: 中国共产党上海市委员会
- Traditional Chinese: 中國共產黨上海市委員會
Transcriptions
Standard Mandarin
- Hanyu Pinyin: Zhōngguó Gòngchǎndǎng Shànghǎi Shì Wěiyuánhuì

Abbreviation
- Chinese: 中共上海市委
- Literal meaning: CCP Shanghai Municipal Committee
Transcriptions
Standard Mandarin
- Hanyu Pinyin: Zhōnggòng Shànghǎi Shìwěi

The Shanghai Municipal Committee of the Chinese Communist Party is the municipal committee of the Chinese Communist Party (CCP) in Shanghai. The CCP committee secretary is the highest ranking post in the city and outranks the mayor, who is generally the deputy secretary of the committee. The current secretary is Chen Jining, a member of the CCP Politburo, who replaced Li Qiang on 28 October 2022.

The committee is elected every five years by the Shanghai Municipal Congress of the CCP. The permanent body of the committee is its Standing Committee.

== Organization ==
The organization of the CCP Shanghai Committee includes:

- General Office

=== Functional Departments ===
- Organization Department
- Publicity Department
- United Front Work Department
- Political and Legal Affairs Commission

=== Offices ===
- Research Office
- Office of the National Security Commission
- Office of the Cyberspace Affairs Commission
- Office of the Central Military-civilian Fusion Development Committee
- Taiwan Work Office
- Office of the Institutional Organization Commission
- Office of the Leading Group for Inspection Work

=== Organizations Directly under the Committee ===
- Shanghai Municipal Party School
- Shanghai United Media Group
- Shanghai Institute of Socialism
- State Commission Office for Public Sector Reform
- Office of the Institutional Organization Commission of the Chinese Communist Party Shanghai Committee

=== Standing Committee ===
The Standing Committee Shanghai Municipal Committee of the Chinese Communist Party is the permanent body of the committee. It currently consists of 10 members:

- Chen Jining, Committee Secretary
- Zhu Zhongming, Mayor of Shanghai, Deputy Committee Secretary
- Chi Yaoyun, Secretary of the Shanghai Commission for Discipline Inspection, Director of the Shanghai Supervisory Commission
- Zhang Wei, Director of the Shanghai Organization Department
- Zhao Jiaming, Head of the Shanghai Publicity Department
- Chen Tong, Head of the Shanghai United Front Work Department
- Li Zheng, Communist Party Secretary of Pudong
- Chen Jinshan, Secretary of the Party Working Committee of the Lingang New Area, Director of the Lingang New Area Administration
- Hua Yuan, Committee Secretary-general
- Chen Jie, Executive Vice Mayor

== Leadership ==
The secretary of the committee is the highest office in Shanghai, being superior to the mayor of the city. Since at least 2007, the secretary has consistently been a member of the CCP Politburo.

=== Party Committees ===
11th Municipal Party Committee (12 May 2017 – 28 June 2022)

- Secretary: Han Zheng (until 29 October 2017), Li Qiang (from 29 October 2017)
- Deputy Secretaries: Ying Yong (Mayor, until February 2020), Yin Hong (until November 2019), Liao Guoxun (February 2020–August 2020), Gong Zheng (Mayor, from March 2020), Yu Shaoliang (October 2020–February 2022), Zhuge Yujie (from March 2022)
- Other Standing Committee members: Dong Yunhu (until May 2018), Wu Jingping (until May 2018), Zhou Bo (February 2019), Chen Yin (until October 2021), Weng Zuliang (until July 2021), Shi Xiaolin (until May 2018), Ling Xi (December 2017–May 2021), Zhou Huilin (from May 2018), Zheng Gangmiao (from June 2018), Wu Qing (from September 2019), Lin Xuexin (from May 2020), Hu Wenrong (from December 2020), Zhu Zhisong (from January 2021), Liu Jie (from May 2021), Zhao Jiaming (from March 2022), Chen Jinshan (from March 2022)

12th Municipal Party Committee (28 June 2022–)

- Secretary: Li Qiang (until 28 October 2022), Chen Jining (from 28 October 2022)
- Deputy Secretaries: Gong Zheng (Mayor), Zhuge Yujie (until March 2023), Wu Qing (July 2023–February 2024)
- Other Standing Committee members: Lin Xuexin (until October 2022), Hu Wenrong (until January 2023), Zhao Jiaming, Chen Tong, Zhu Zhisong, Zhang Wei, Chen Jinshan, Guo Fang (until June 2023), Li Yangzhe (from October 2022), Hu Shijun (from April 2023), Li Zheng (from July 2023), Hua Yuan (from February 2024)

== See also ==
- Politics of Shanghai
