= Oriental Library, Shanghai =

Library in Shanghai, China

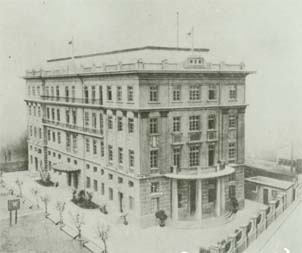
Oriental Library, Shanghai

The Oriental Library (Chinese:東方圖書館) was a pioneering library in Shanghai, China. Established in 1925, it was the first publicly accessible private library in China. Located on Baoshan Road in Zhabei, it was owned and run by The Commercial Press.

At its peak, the library was by far the largest private library in the country, holding a total of 463,083 volumes, even surpassing the National Peking Library. In contrast, the Commercial Press' main competitor, the Zhonghua Book Company's library, held only about 90,000 volumes by 1934.

== Destruction ==
The library and its collection, except for 5,000 rare Song and Yuan dynasty books that were stored off-site in a bank vault, as well as many other neighbouring buildings, were entirely destroyed overnight by Japanese aerial bombing during the January 28 Incident in 1932.
