= Shanghai Commune of 1927 =

Short-lived provisional government

Provisional Municipal Government of the Special City of Shanghai 上海特別市臨時市政府
- Location of Shanghai within the Republic of China
- Capital: Shanghai
- Historical era: Northern Expedition
  - Established: 22 March 1927
  - Disestablished: 1 April 1927

The Provisional Municipal Government of the Special City of Shanghai (Chinese: 上海特別市臨時市政府), also known as the Shanghai Civil Government (上海市民政府) or Shanghai Commune, was a provisional administration that briefly governed the city of Shanghai during the Northern Expedition. Established by people's committees with the assistance of Chen Duxiu, Zhou Enlai, and the Chinese Communist Party (CCP), the commune briefly administered the city of Shanghai before its forceful dissolution by order of Chiang Kai-shek. The dissolution of the Shanghai Commune would lead to the 1927 Shanghai massacre, and the onset of the Chinese Civil War.

== Background ==
As Shanghai held a large industrial base, the CCP, who were influenced by the events of the October Revolution, viewed Shanghai as a natural base for a worker's uprising in China. By 1927, popular opposition to the control of local warlords, combined with the growing military successes of the First United Front encouraged local organs of the CCP to overthrow the local administration, leading to two separate armed uprisings between January and early March 1927.

== Formation ==
During a general strike on March 22, 1927, Chen Duxiu and Zhou Enlai would lead a group of 5,000 armed workers in the city's third armed uprising. After seizing the city by 6pm, they, along with soviets organized by strikers, established the Shanghai Provisional Municipal Government along the lines of the Paris Commune. During the meeting, 19 members were elected to the municipal government, with 9 representatives from the CCP, and 9 from the various factions of the Kuomintang.

== Dissolution ==
After receiving word of its formation, Chiang Kai-shek demanded that the Shanghai Commune be dissolved, and appointed Right KMT officials as heads of a future provincial government. Chen Duxiu would then hold a meeting with members of the CCP, including Zhou Enlai, preparing for conflict with Chiang Kai-shek. However, the municipal government would have to garner support in resistance against Chiang from both the Kuomintang's Left Faction and the Communist International, and would be refused by both. As a result, the Comintern's actions in China would be criticized both by some within the Soviet Union, such as Leon Trotsky, and by retrospective scholars. Troops loyal to Chiang would ultimately enter the city on April 12, and dissolve the commune.

== See also ==
- The Shanghai People's Commune established during the Cultural Revolution
