= Wu Shufang =

Teacher murdered in the Guangxi Massacre

- Died: 1968; Wuxuan, Guangxi, China
- Cause of death: Murder
- Occupation: Geography teacher
- Employer: Wuxuan Middle School
- Known for: Victim of cannibalism during the Guangxi Massacre

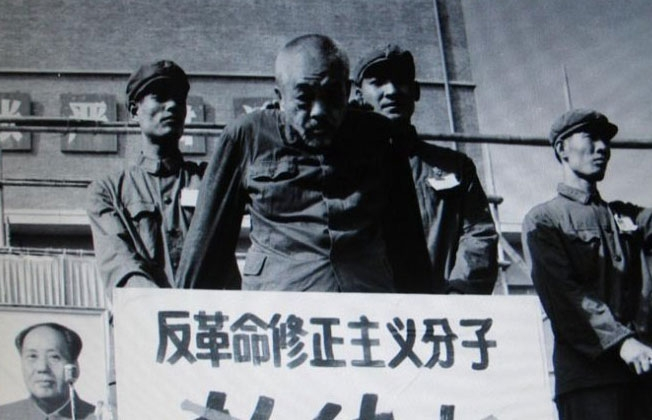
A struggle session for Peng Duhai with a sign that reads "counter-revolutionary revisionist element"

Wu Shufang (Chinese: 吴树芳; died 1968) was a middle school geography teacher who was subject to multiple struggle sessions and then murdered and eaten by her students during the Guangxi Massacre of the Cultural Revolution.

== Life and murder ==
Wu Shufang taught geography at Wuxuan Middle School in the 1960s. Her students were members of the Red Guard and denounced her as a "class enemy". She was forced to attend struggle sessions.

Wu's students beat her with belts and sticks until she died. They dragged her body through the streets of Wuxuan to the bank of the Qian River, a common location for public executions of "class enemies". Under the supervision of CCP guards, the students forced another teacher to stab Wu's dead body and grab her heart and liver. The students took the heart and liver back to Euxuan Middle School where they barbecued the organs and ate them in a "flesh banquet".

== Aftermath ==
Wu was one of thousands killed as "class enemies" in the Guangxi Massacre. The massacre was covered up until Deng Xiaoping's reforms in the late 1970s. Once it became known, 91 CCP members were expelled and 39 people were demoted. According to a high-ranking member of an official investigation of the massacre, "all the cannibalism was due to class struggle being whipped up and was used to express a kind of hatred. The murder was ghastly, worse than beasts."

Wu's case became widely known through journalist Zheng Yi's account of cannibalism during the Cultural Revolution, Scarlet Memorial: Tales of Cannibalism in Modern China. However, students in Wuxuan today are largely ignorant not only of the murder of Wu Shufang but of the many murders and cases of cannibalism that took place in their town in the late 1960s.

== See also ==
- Cannibalism in Asia
