= Guangxi Massacre =

1967–1968 massacres in China

- Part of the Cultural Revolution
- Guangxi in China
- Location: Guangxi, China
- Date: 1967–1968
- Attack type: Massacre, cannibalism, politicide, lynching, rape, torture, beheading, beating, live burial, stoning, drowning, boiling, disembowelment
- Deaths: 70,400–500,000; Official: 100,000–150,000; At least 421 people eaten
- Victims: Rebel Faction Red Guards and sympathizers, Class enemies, including members of the Five Black Categories and their families
- Perpetrators: Conservative Faction Red Guards, members and ranking cadres of the Chinese Communist Party, local militia
- Motive: Conflict between the Guangxi Rebel Faction and Conservative Faction; Differing interpretations of Maoist thought; Anti-landlord and anti–wealthy peasant sentiment

The Guangxi Massacre (simplified Chinese: 广西大屠杀; traditional Chinese: 廣西大屠殺; pinyin: Guǎngxī dàtúshā) comprised a series of lynchings and massacres in the Chinese province of Guangxi between 1967 and 1968, during the Cultural Revolution (1966–1976). The official record from the 1983 investigation documents 89,810 abnormal deaths and concluded that the total death toll exceeded 100,000 when accounting for undocumented cases and missing persons. Methods of murder included beheading, beating, live burial, stoning, drowning, boiling, and disembowelling.

In specific areas, including Wuxuan County and Wuming, Nanning, hundreds of incidents of human cannibalism occurred, even though no famine conditions existed. According to initial records available, at least 137 people were eaten, with thousands of people having participated in the cannibalism; subsequent published official archives showed at least 302 people were eaten. Independent researchers have since identified 421 named individuals in total who were eaten, with there having been reports of cannibalism across dozens of counties in Guangxi. Although the cannibalism was sponsored by local offices of the Communist Party and militia, no direct evidence suggests that anyone in the national Communist Party leadership including Mao Zedong endorsed the cannibalism or even knew of it. However, some scholars have pointed out that Wuxuan County, through internal channels, had notified the central leadership about the cannibalism in 1968.

After the Cultural Revolution, people who were involved in the massacre or cannibalism received legal punishments during the Boluan Fanzheng period. In Wuxuan County, where at least 38 people were eaten, fifteen participants were prosecuted, receiving up to 14 years in prison, while ninety-one members of the Chinese Communist Party (CCP) were expelled from the party and thirty-nine non-party officials were either demoted or had a salary cut.

== Historical background ==
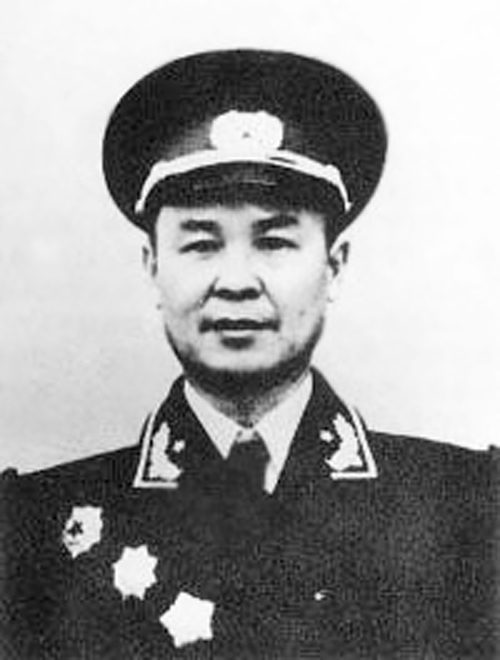
General Wei Guoqing, Chairman of Guangxi at the time of the massacre

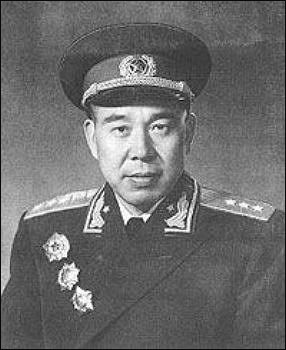
Huang Yongsheng, head of the Guangzhou Military Region at the time of the massacre

In May 1966, Mao Zedong launched the Cultural Revolution. Starting from March 1967, two factions gradually formed among troops and civilians in Guangxi. One faction known as the "United Headquarters" (Chinese: "联指", lianzhi) unconditionally supported the leadership of Wei Guoqing, who was the First Secretary of the CPC Guangxi Zhuang Autonomous Region Committee, the Chairman of Guangxi Zhuang Autonoumous Region, and the First Political Commissar of the Guangzhou Military Region and First Political Commissar of the Guangxi Military Region of the People's Liberation Army (PLA), while the other faction known as the "4.22" (Chinese: "四·二二", si.erer) opposed such unconditional support, asking Wei to do self-criticism first. The "United Headquarters" was an example of the conservative faction while the "4.22" was an example of the rebel faction. Intense clashes including "violent struggles" and even massacres soon broke out between the two factions in rural regions of Guangxi.

Even though the rebel faction "4.22" received endorsement from China's Premier Zhou Enlai in August 1967, it was at a disadvantage throughout Guangxi except in the city of Guilin because the local military leaders endorsed the conservative faction, the "United Headquarters". In February 1968, Guangzhou Military Region ordered the troops who supported "4.22" to dislocate from the region, and subsequently in April 1968, Huang Yongsheng, head of the Guangzhou Military Region at the time, declared that the "4.22" faction was a "reactionary organization" and launched massive suppression against the rebel faction (at the same time, a closely related massacre also took place in the nearby province of Guangdong).

== The massacre ==
=== Stages of killings ===
According to Yan Lebin (晏乐斌), a member of the Ministry of Public Security who participated in the official investigations of the Guangxi Massacre after the Cultural Revolution, there were three stages of the massacre.

- The first stage of the massacre mostly took place in the rural areas of Guangxi between the fall of 1967 and the spring of 1968. Most of the victims at this stage were members of the Five Black Categories and their families, including many who supported the "4.22" faction (the rebel faction).
- The second stage of the massacre took place in the spring and summer of 1968 when most counties in Guangxi had established their revolutionary committees. Most of the massive killings at this stage were organized by revolutionary committees and local People's Armed Departments, targeting members of the "4.22" faction, their supporters, and politically stigmatized households in rural areas.
- The third stage of the massacre took place in the summer of 1968, during which massive killings had spread from rural regions to cities in Guangxi. In particular, in July and August 1968, a large number of troops from the Guangzhou Military Region together with members of the "United Headquarters" (the conservative faction) attacked major cities such as Nanning and Guilin, which were under control of the "4.22" faction. Tens of thousands of people were killed or executed.

=== Methods of killings ===
In the massacre, methods of slaughter included "beheading, beating, live burial, stoning, drowning, boiling, group slaughters, disemboweling, digging out hearts, livers, genitals, slicing off flesh, blowing up with dynamite, and more". In one case, according to official records, a person had dynamite bound to the back and was blown up into pieces by other people (so called "heavenly maiden scattering flowers", 天女散花)—just for fun. This crime was led by Cen Guorong (岑国荣), who was once the Director of the Trade Union of Guangxi and had served as a representative in the Ninth, Tenth, and Eleventh National Congresses of the Chinese Communist Party.

In another case of 1968, "a geography instructor named Wu Shufang (吴树芳) was beaten to death by students at Wuxuan Middle School. Her body was carried to the flat stones of the Qian River where another teacher was forced at gunpoint to rip out the heart and liver. Back at the school the pupils barbecued and consumed the organs."

=== Death toll ===
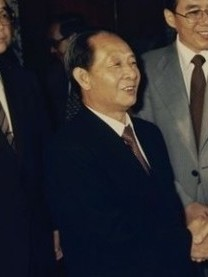
During the Boluan Fanzheng period, Hu Yaobang sent several teams to Guangxi to investigate the massacres.

Beginning 1981, at least three investigation teams were sent to Guangxi by CCP leaders in Beijing, including Hu Yaobang (then the Chairman and Secretary-General of the Central Committee of the CPC) and Xi Zhongxun (then the Secretary of the Secretariat of the Central Committee of the CPC). In a span of approximately five years, the Guangxi Zhuang Autonomous Regional Committee of the Chinese Communist Party was re-organized and over 100,000 local officials were tasked with investigating and resolving the remaining issues from the Cultural Revolution. Between 1986 and 1988, the Guangxi CCP Regional Committee composed the Archives about the Cultural Revolution in Guangxi, which were later published as the Secret Archives about the Cultural Revolution in Guangxi in the United States in 2016 (and its Supplement in 2017).

==== First investigation group ====
In April 1981, an investigation group of over 20 people was formed under the arrangement of the Central Commission for Discipline Inspection, the General Office of the Chinese Communist Party, the Organization Department of the Chinese Communist Party, the Ministry of Public Security, the Supreme People's Court, and the Supreme People's Procuratorate.

In June 1981, the investigation concluded that the death toll was over 100,000, while some officials and civilians claimed privately that the death toll was 150,000, 200,000 or even 500,000. In addition, Qiao Xiaoguang reported to the Central Commission for Discipline Inspection that the death toll was 70,400.

==== Second investigation group ====
In March 1983, another investigation group of 40 people was formed by the Central Committee of the Chinese Communist Party. The group were led by Li Rui (then the Executive Vice Minister of the Organization Department of the CPC Central Committee), Zhou Yifeng (周一峰) (then a member of the Standing Committee of the Jiangsu Provincial Committee of the CPC and the Executive Vice Governor of Jiangsu Province) and other senior officials from the CCP central leadership.

In January 1984, a second investigation documented a total of 89,810 abnormal deaths, with the investigators also counting nearly 20,000 missing persons whose deaths could not be documented, leading them to the conclusion that the actual death toll exceeded 100,000. In particular, due to the violent struggles between the two opposing factions, 3,700 people died during direct fighting, 7,000 were persecuted to death, while 79,000 were beaten or shot to death in a planned and systematic matter. In Nanning, the capital of Guangxi, eight out of fourteen counties saw a death toll of over 1,000, with Binyang County alone losing 3,777 people.

=== Academic studies ===
In 2006, Su Yang (苏阳) of University of California, Irvine, argued that the Guangxi massacre was the most serious massacre during the Chinese Cultural Revolution. He stated that among the 65 accessible official county documents of Guangxi, 43 counties report local massacres with 15 of them recording a death toll of over 1,000, while the average death toll was 526 among all the counties which reported massacre. Moreover, Song Yongyi pointed out that there were many differences between published official data and classified official data. For example, the published county annals of Lingshan County shows only eight people died, but in its classified document there were 3,220 victims; for another example, the published document from Binyang County shows 37 victims only, compared to 3,951 victims in its classified document.

In his 2002 book Massacres during the Cultural Revolution, Song argued that most Cultural Revolution massacres were the action of "state apparatuses", or the direct slaughter by the regime towards its citizens. However, in his award-winning 2021 book Collective Killings in Rural China during the Cultural Revolution, Su proposed the "community model" to explain the massacre in Guangxi, challenging the prevailing models of genocide and mass killings.

Sociologist Andrew G. Walder describes the Guangxi events as a "regional civil war". Based on extensive archival investigations, he argues that the exceptionally high death toll was not simply the result of spontaneous collective violence. Instead, it stemmed from an organized campaign in which local militia forces, operating within a broader military command structure, were mobilized to suppress rival factions. Their violence also targeted many civilians associated with politically stigmatized social groups. For Walder, the military command system, closely intertwined with civilian party and government organizations, played a decisive role in guiding and amplifying local violence. He stresses the influence of state and military organizations, comparing the events with the Indonesian mass killings of 1965–1966 and arguing that they cannot be explained as chiefly due to local, rural social dynamics.

== Mass cannibalism ==
=== Official investigation ===
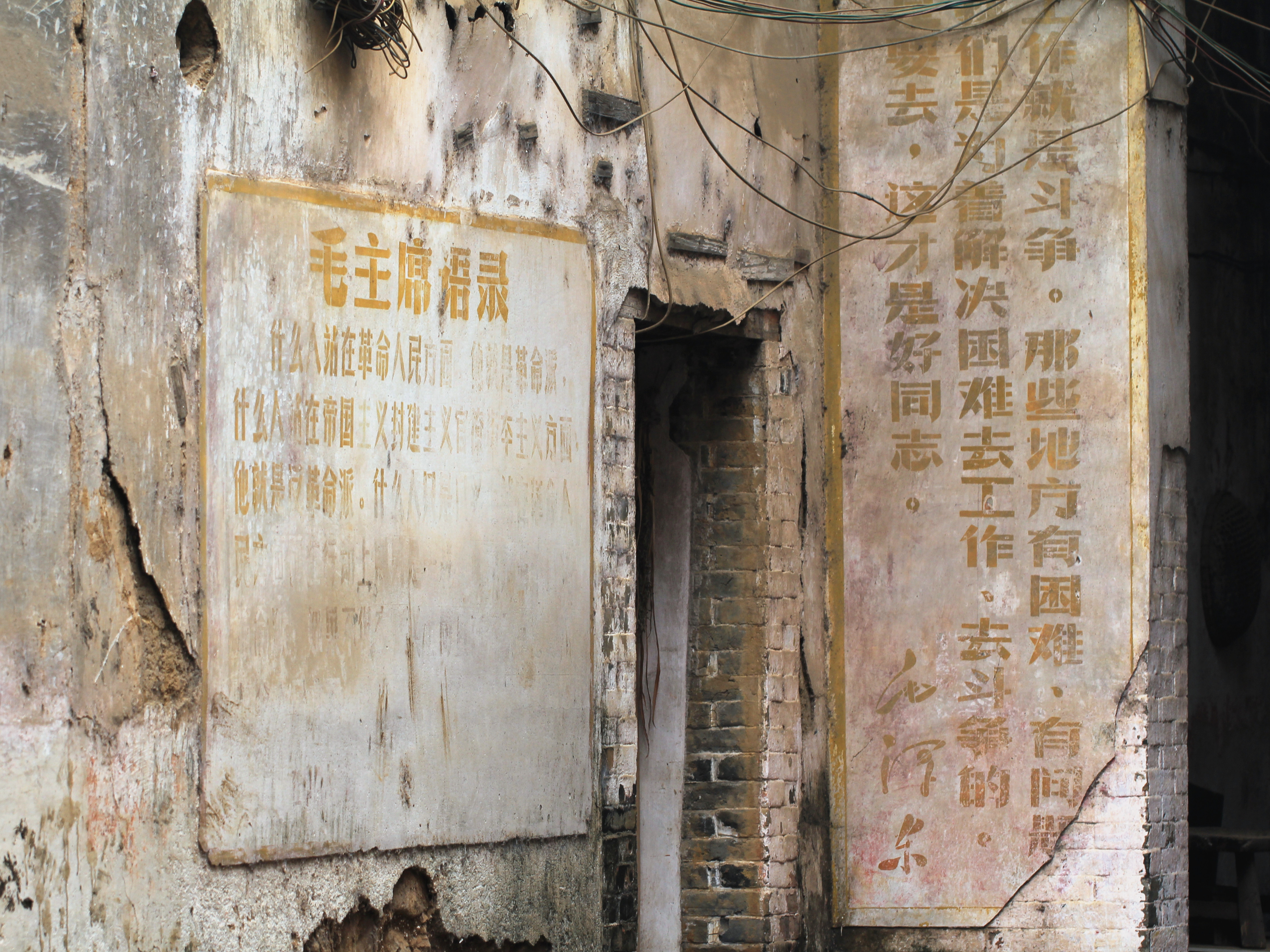
Wuxuan County of Guangxi, where cannibalism was prevalent during the Cultural Revolution. The image shows the quotations from Chairman Mao Zedong on a street wall of Wuxuan.

Human cannibalism occurred in Guangxi during the Cultural Revolution. It was reported from multiple locations, with cases documented for dozens of counties. In some areas, such as Wuxuan County, a particularly high number of victims were subjected to post-mortem mutilation and consumption. These incidents were typically associated with organized episodes of mass violence rather than conditions of food scarcity. Documents record a variety of forms of cannibalism, including eating people as an after-dinner snack, slicing off the meat in big parties, dividing up the flesh so each person could take a large chunk home, and barbecuing or roasting the liver.

In 2016 and 2017, official archives were published, which contain details about the massacres and cannibalism; the archives show that at least 302 people were eaten, and tens of thousands of other people participated in the cannibalism. Independent researchers have since identified 421 named individuals in total who were eaten across dozens of counties in Guangxi. According to Yan Lebin (晏乐斌), a member of the Ministry of Public Security who was part of the official investigation teams in the 1980s:

In 1968, 38 people in Wuxuan County were eaten, and 113 officials of the county participated in eating human flesh, hearts and livers. Chen Guorong, a peasant from Guigang County who happened to pass by Wuxuan, was caught and killed by local militia because he was fat; his heart and liver were taken out while his flesh was distributed to 20 people. A female militia leader ate 6 human livers in total, and cut the genitals of 5 men and soaked them in alcohol which she would drink later, claiming that these organs were beneficial to her health. The behavior of eating human flesh, hearts and livers occurred in many counties of Guangxi including Wuxuan, Wuming, Shangsi, Guigang, Qinzhou, Guiping, and Lingyun ... After the revolutionary committee was established in Shangsi County, a "killing conference" was held at Pingshan Square (平山广场) on September 1, 1968, during which more than 10 officials and civilians were beaten to death. After the conference, a committee member, Li Hao (黎郝), removed the hearts and livers from the corpses, sauteing them and preparing them as dishes for other representatives who attended the conference.

=== Academic studies ===
According to Song Yongyi, a Chinese historian who works at the California State University, Los Angeles:

Independent researchers in Guangxi counted a total of 421 people who were eaten. There were reports of cannibalism across 27 counties in Guangxi; that's two-thirds of all the counties in Guangxi. There was one man who was said to be in the so-called fifth category, who was beaten to death where he stood. He had two kids, one of 11 and one of 14. The local officials and armed militia said that it was important to eradicate such people, and so they not only killed those two children: they ate them too. This took place in Pubei county, Guangxi, where 35 people were killed and eaten in total. Most of them were rich landowners and their families. There was one landowner called Liu Zhengjian whose entire family was wiped out. He had a 17-year-old daughter, Liu Xiulan, who was gang-raped by nine people [for 19 times] who then ripped open her belly, and ate her liver and breasts. There were so many incidents like this.

According to Frank Dikötter, Chair Professor of Humanities at the University of Hong Kong, Senior Fellow at Hoover Institution of Stanford, and winner of the 2011 Samuel Johnson Prize:

Throughout 1967 but also '68, there are factions in the countryside that start not just eliminating each other physically, but literally in a couple of small towns they start ritualistically eating each other. In other words, it is not enough to eliminate your class enemy. You have to eat his heart, so there are very well-documented cases of ritual cannibalism. There was a hierarchy in the consumption of class enemies. Leaders feasted on the heart and liver, mixed with pork, while ordinary villagers were allowed only to peck at the victims' arms and thighs.

Regarding the motive for cannibalism, Ding Xueliang (丁学良), a professor at the University of British Columbia and the Hong Kong University of Science and Technology, pointed out that "this was not cannibalism because of economic difficulties, like during famine. It was not caused by economic reasons, it was caused by political events, political hatred, political ideologies, political rituals." Qin Hui also showed with statistics that the cannibalism was not due to the traditions of local ethnic minorities; he argued that the cannibalism was mainly due to: 1) the extreme class struggle during the Cultural Revolution, which led to a modern caste system (such as the Five Black Categories) and an extreme massacre towards the lower class from the upper class; 2) the revenge from the local officials and military towards the rebel group who challenged their interests.

According to Song Yongyi, the motive behind cannibalism was personal desire. Song stated that these people engaged in cannibalistic activities because they "believe that when they eat other people's livers, other people's hearts, it will help them to have a long life". Furthermore, Roderick MacFarquhar and Michael Schoenhals disputed that it was communism that compelled people in that area towards cannibalism, noting that similar incidents occurred under pressure from the Kuomintang secret police in the Republican period.

== Public responses ==
=== Witnesses and investigators ===
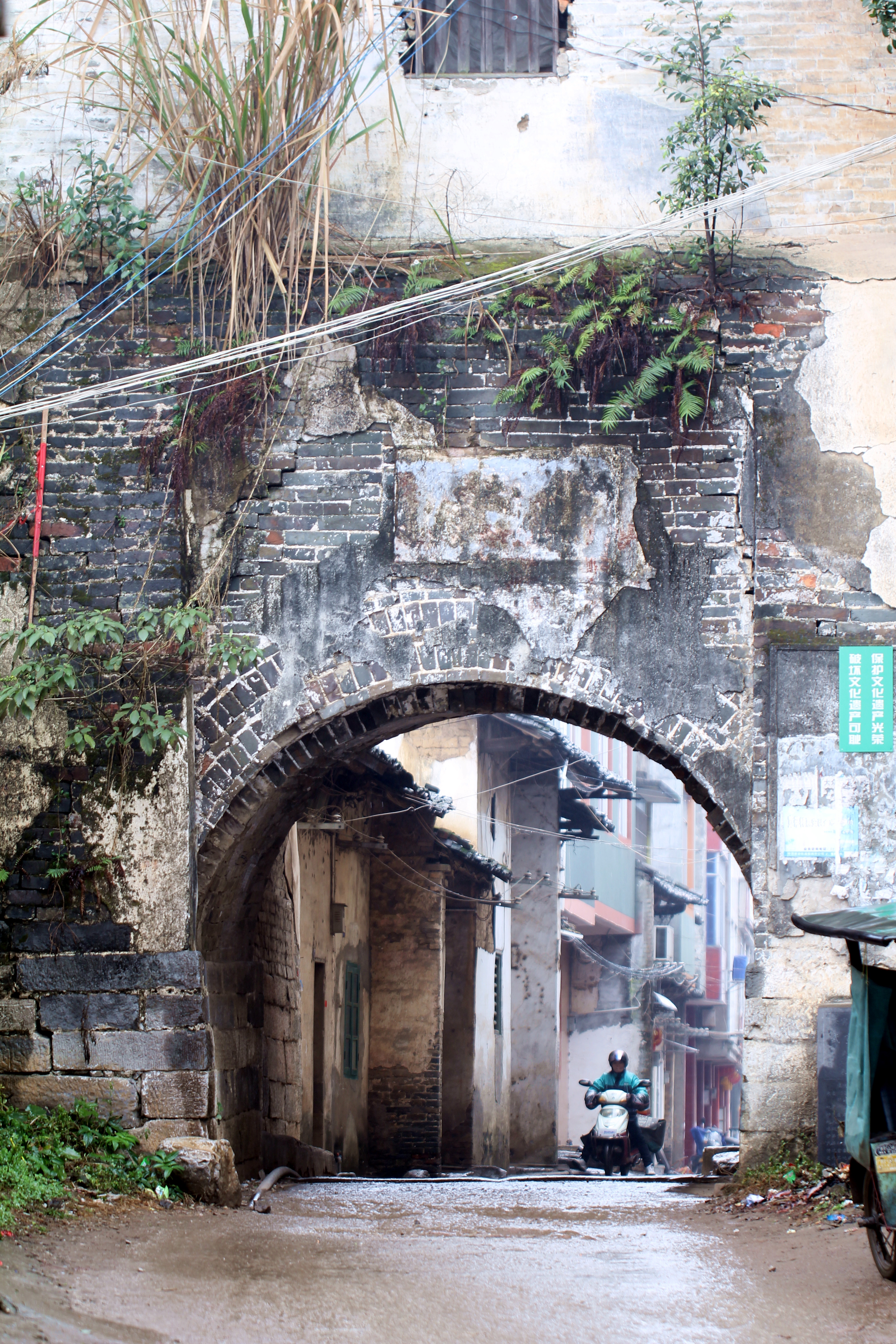
The North Gate of Wuxuan County in Guangxi

A number of people publicly spoke about their reminiscences of the massacre and how they affected their world views. In 2013, Yang Liping, a notable Chinese dancer, said that she had seen cannibalism during the Cultural Revolution (though she did not specify the exact location). She stated that "I am pessimistic about humanity and pessimistic about humans. Because we have been through the Cultural Revolution, we have become very alert. I am very alert, alert like a peacock. Be careful, because humans are the most horrible animals ... I saw people eating people, and people hurting people, just like nowadays. Nowadays people can hurt you anytime, yet they don't even know why they hurt you."

A very different reaction came from an inhabitant of the region who stressed the need to leave the past behind and move on. When interviewed by Agence France-Presse (AFP) in 2016, he responded, "Cannibalism? I was here then, I went through it. But Wuxuan has developed rapidly in recent years and now. That history 'has no meaning'." At the same time, a high-ranking member of an early 1980s official investigation told AFP that "[a]ll the cannibalism was due to class struggle being whipped up and was used to express a kind of hatred. The murder was ghastly, worse than beasts."

=== Researchers ===
A number of researchers discussed the credibility of the reports of widespread cannibalism during the massacre, as well as their meaning. Sinologist Gang Yue was sceptical, questioning in 1999 how "systematic" the cannibalism could have been, given the inherent factionalism of the Cultural Revolution.

On the other hand, Donald S. Sutton, a professor at Carnegie Mellon University, wrote in 1995:

Did cannibalism actually take place in Wuxuan? ... That the incident truly occurred was independently confirmed by a recent visitor to Wuxuan, the scholar and journalist, John Gittings. An off-duty local clerk spoke airily of the killings and the cannibalism—obligingly writing down his name and address when asked—and added with a touch of pride, "In Wuxuan ... we ate more people than anywhere else in China"....

In 2001, sinologist Perry Link of Princeton University likewise stated that he considered the descriptions credible: "I believe Zheng's story [of cannibalism]. He's a writer of integrity, and the rich detail has the ring of authenticity."

Key Ray Chong, a professor of history at Texas Tech University, compared the massacre with other events of mass murder and genocide, writing in 1997 in his review of Zheng Yi's Scarlet Memorial: "During the Cultural Revolution, quite a few Chinese officials knew of this horror, the equivalent of the Nazi Holocaust in the 1940s and the killing fields of Pol Pot in the 1970s. But they remained silent about the subject."

In 2013, Qin Hui, a professor at Tsinghua University, mentioned during a discussion with sociologist Ezra Vogel that the massacre had shaped his own youth: "My hometown is in Guangxi, where people were killed in massacres during Mao's era, and some of them were eaten by others! In the bloody summer of 1968, people in Hong Kong and Macau all knew that there were corpses floating down from Xi River to Pearl River."

=== Media ===
- In 1993, The New York Times stated that "[t]he incidents reported from Guangxi were apparently the most extensive episodes of cannibalism in the world in the last century or more. They were also different from any others in that those who took part were not motivated by hunger or psychopathic illness. Instead, the actions appeared to be ideological: the cannibalism, which the documents say took place in public, was often organized by local Communist Party officials, and people apparently took part together to prove their revolutionary ardor."
- In 1993, Newsweek stated that "[t]he accounts were harrowing. Principals killed in schoolyards by students, then cooked and eaten. Government-run cafeterias displaying human bodies hanging from meat hooks and dishing them out to employees ... Documents smuggled out of China last week described atrocities of the Cultural Revolution in grotesque detail."
- In 1993, Time stated that "Mao Zedong's Cultural Revolution was an eruption of ideological fervor, mass hysteria and outright brutality that left an estimated 10 million Chinese dead and ruined the lives of millions more. Now tales of even more horrible excesses from the years between 1966 and 1976 are coming to light: allegations of cannibalism, involving hundreds of men and women who violated mankind's most powerful taboo in the name of revolutionary purity."
- In 1996, The Washington Post stated, after Zheng Yi published his book that "[t]he party wants to block any deep-going analysis of the role played by the late Chairman Mao Zedong and numerous party members. Full disclosure of the truth might destroy what little legitimacy the party still clings to."
- In 2013, People's Net, the official media of the Chinese Communist Party, as well as some other Chinese media reprinted an article from China Youth Daily, which stated that during the Cultural Revolution "in some places such as Guangxi, the hearts and livers of people were eaten after they were beaten to death, and, surprisingly, such cannibalism was prevalent in that region!" The article further stated, "throughout the human history of the 20th century, was there any country that had experienced the Cultural Revolution like ours? The only comparable time was Nazi Germany. However, up to this date, we do not even have a decent review or reflection on this period of history ... The society that does not reflect on the Cultural Revolution is perhaps still a tribe of cannibalism. Such a tribe, no matter how beautiful its people look and how modernized its civilization appears, is still a tribe of cannibalism without humanity."
- In 2016, The Irish Times stated in its review of Cultural Revolution that "[t]errible stories abounded. There were tales of cannibalism in Guangxi province where 'bad elements' were publicly butchered and more than 70 victims were eaten in Wuxuan."
- In 2016, The Guardian stated in its review of Cultural Revolution that "[p]erhaps the worst affected region was the southern province of Guangxi where there were reports of mass killings and even cannibalism."

== See also ==
- Guangdong Massacre
- Boluan Fanzheng
- Reform and opening up
- Mass killings under communist regimes
- List of massacres in China
- Scarlet Memorial: Tales of Cannibalism in Modern China
