= Guangdong Cultural Revolution Massacre =

Mass Killings during the Chinese Cultural Revolution

- Part of the Cultural Revolution in China
- Native name: 广东文革屠杀
- Location: Guangdong Province
- Date: 1968; July 1968 – October 1968
- Target: Counter-revolutionaries, opponents of Mao Zedong Thought, members of the "Five Black Categories"
- Attack type: Political persecution, politicide, politically motivated violence
- Deaths: 1,000-8,000 (Estimated)
- Perpetrators: Chinese Communist Party, local Revolutionary Committees
- Motive: Reprisals against class enemies, destruction of the Four Olds and Five Black Categories

The Guangdong Cultural Revolution Massacre (simplified Chinese: 广东文革屠杀; traditional Chinese: 廣東文革屠殺) was a series of massacres that took place in Guangdong Province of China during the Cultural Revolution. There were 80 counties in Guangdong during the Cultural Revolution, and according to the 57 county annals which became available during the "Boluan Fanzheng" period, massacres occurred in 28 of the counties with six counties recording a death toll of over 1,000—the average death toll among all the 28 counties was 278. The massacre in Yangjiang was the most serious, with over 2,600 deaths in Yangchun County alone. In addition, massacres also occurred in some cities of Guangdong; in the capital city Guangzhou, for example, the massacre targeting the prisoners of Laogai resulted in the deaths of at least 187–197 people within a week of August 1967.

Most of the Cultural Revolution massacres in Guangdong took place from July to October, 1968, and were led and organized by the provincial and local revolutionary committees. The Guangdong massacre was among the most serious collective killings in China at the time, and was related to the Guangxi Massacre. There were two major types of massacres in Guangdong: one type targeted members of the Five Black Categories (landlords, wealthy peasants, "bad influences/elements" and "right wingers") as well as their relatives, and the other type was related to political persecutions. Moreover, in eastern Hainan, which was an administrative region of Guangdong Province at the time, massacres also occurred in places such as the Dan County (over 700 deaths).

After the Cultural Revolution, some of the victims in the massacres were rehabilitated by the Central Committee of the Chinese Communist Party (CCP) as well as the Guangdong Provincial Committee of CCP during the Boluan Fanzheng period. In January 1980, the Guangdong Revolutionary Committee was removed and the People's Government of Guangdong was re-established.

== Historical background ==
=== Clashes between two factions ===
In May 1966, the Cultural Revolution was launched. In early 1967, local governments and committee party leadership in Guangdong were paralyzed due to the power-seizure movement by the "rebel group", and the society was in chaos. On March 15, Mao deemed military control necessary in Guangdong, appointing Huang Yongsheng as the director of the Military Control Commission. In 1967, two factions in Guangdong—the "Red Flag faction (红旗派)", which was a rebel group, and the "East Wind faction (东风派)", which was a conservative group and supported the military control—often went into large-scale violent struggles.

Premier Zhou Enlai had made several attempts to mitigate the situation since April 1967, demanding in November the establishment of the "Guangdong Revolutionary Committee". In the meantime, Huang Yongsheng also tried to negotiate with the leaders from both factions, hoping to achieve a "grand revolution union (革命大联合)".

=== The Guangdong Revolutionary Committee ===
In February 1968, the Guangdong Revolutionary Committee was established, with Huang Yongsheng being the chairman of the committee; Huang was also the commander of the Guangzhou Military Region and personally supported the East Wind faction. However, organized defiance from the Red Flag faction persisted, and as a result the violent struggles continued while societal order did not re-establish in the following three months. Meanwhile, in May 1968, Mao Zedong launched the "Cleansing the Class Ranks", a nationwide political purge that resulted in the persecution of at least tens of thousands in Guangzhou alone, many of whom with foreign ties were persecuted to death.

Starting from July 1968, the Guangdong Revolutionary Committee as well as the Guangdong military took advantage of two directives from the Central Committee of Chinese Communist Party (July 3rd Public Notice and July 24th Public Notice), using them as excuses for cracking down the Red Flag faction, and thereafter collective killings became prevalent in Guangdong. The peak of the massacre lasted from July to October in 1968.

== The massacres ==
=== Yangjiang Massacre ===
According to the officials in Yangjiang, at least 3,573 people died in the Yangjiang Massacre.

- The massacre in Yangjiang County took place from January 1, 1968, to mid-January 1969, killing 909 people.
- The massacre in Yangchun County began on September 23, 1967, killing 2,664 people.

The methods of slaughter included beating with hoes or clubs, gun shooting, drowning, stabbing, stoning, exploding with fireworks, burning with kerosene, live burial, and so on.

=== Guangzhou Laogai Fan Incident ===
The Guangzhou Laogai Fan Incident (广州吊劳改犯事件/广州打劳改犯事件), or the incident of Laogai prisoners, took place in Guangzhou in August 1967. The incident lasted for around a week and was caused by rumors that the Laogai prisoners were released from prisons in northern Guangdong and that Guangzhou was about to be looted. As a result, local civilians committed acts of extreme violence against strangers for the sake of self-protection. According to researchers, at least 187–197 people were killed in the massacre (some say around 300), most of whom were local citizens living in Guangzhou or its rural areas. Many bodies of the victims in the massacre were hung up on trees or utility poles along the streets.

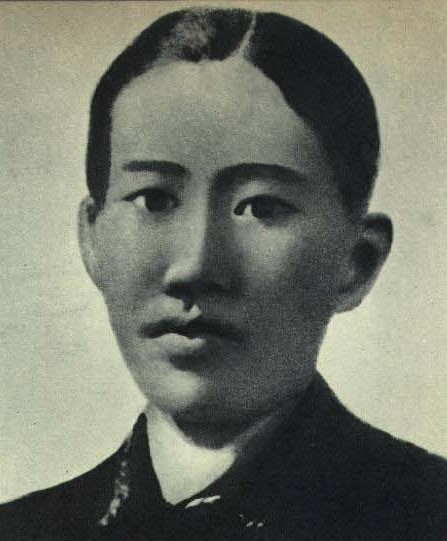
The painted picture of Peng Pai

=== Anti-Peng Pai Incident ===
The Anti-Peng Pai Incident (反彭湃事件), or the Case of Peng Pai's relatives (彭湃亲属案件), was a major "wrong" case in Shanwei, Guangdong, during the Cultural Revolution, targeting relatives of the late Peng Pai, who was a pioneer of the Chinese peasants' movement and one of the leaders of Chinese Communist Party at its earlier stage. In the incident, Peng Pai was labelled as a "traitor" and "opportunist". Starting August 1967, a massacre broke out and lasted for around half a month, causing the deaths of over 160 people; in addition, over 800 were crippled for life and over 3,000 were injured. The cousin and the nephew of Peng Pai were killed in the massacre, while Peng's mother was persecuted; the head of Peng's nephew was cut off by the perpetrator and displayed to the public for three days. In August 1968, Peng Hong (彭洪), the third son of Peng Pai, was killed and buried secretly. In 1978 after the end of the Cultural Revolution, Xi Zhongxun (习仲勋) was in charge of Guangdong province and officially redressed this incident as well as rehabilitated Peng Pai's relatives and all the related victims thoroughly, and determined that "the incident was part of a conspiracy by Lin Biao and the Gang of Four to usurp the party and seize power.".

Some Chinese dissidents have claimed that Peng Pai imposed Red Terror in the Hailufeng Soviet. They further alleged that thousands of landlords died as a result of him, and "thus the Anti-Peng Pai Incident was essentially retaliation from the local citizens. But the sources that they cited actually stated that only 1,822 of landlords lost their lives under him, and this was mainly due to the "White Terror" or "the enemy's crazy slaughter". The "White Terror" had killed near 40,000 workers, peasants, students, and "revolutionary masses" in Guangzhou prior to the "Red Terror".

=== Dan County Massacre ===
During the Cultural Revolution, massacres broke out in Dan County and Dongfang County of Hainan Island, which was an administrative division of Guangdong Province at the time. In March 1967, the local Military Control Commission announced that three mass organizations in Dan County were "counter-revolutionary organizations". In April 1968, the local revolutionary committee was established and in August, local military began its massacre targeting members of the counter-revolutionary organizations, killing over 700 people in total. Moreover, more than 50,000 people (some say 5,000) were jailed, some 700 houses were burned down, and thousands of people were permanently disabled.

=== Other areas ===
Map of municipalities in Guangdong.

According to a research paper (2003) by Andrew G. Walder of Stanford University and Yang Su of UC Irvine, each of the following six counties in Guangdong reported death tolls of over 1,000 due to the Cultural Revolution:

County	abnormal deaths
Yangchun	2,600
Wuhua	2,136
Lianjiang	1,851
Mei	1,403
Guangning	1,218
Lian	1,019

== Death toll ==
During the Cultural Revolution, Guangdong recorded one of the highest numbers of "abnormal deaths" in China:

- In 2016, Fei Yan (now of Tsinghua University) concluded that the average number of abnormal deaths (including the number of deaths in massacres) among counties in Guangdong was 299, the fifth highest number nationwide.
- In 2006, Yang Su of UC Irvine concluded based on the 57 county annals available (out of the 80 counties during the Cultural Revolution) that the average number of abnormal deaths among the counties was 311.6, while the average number of deaths due to collective killings (at least 10 people were killed at once) was 278 among the 28 counties that reported massacres—the total number was 7,784.
- In 2003, Andrew G. Walder of Stanford University and Yang Su of UC Irvine concluded based on the 61 county annals available (out of the 114 counties of Guangdong) that the average number of abnormal deaths among the counties was 290, the third highest number nationwide. The total number of abnormal deaths was 33,060.

== Aftermath ==
In September 1971, the "Lin Biao incident" broke out and Huang Yongsheng, then chairman of the Guangdong Revolutionary Committee, was removed from his post and was arrested as an ally of Lin. In August 1973, Huang was expelled out of the Chinese Communist Party. In September 1976, Mao Zedong died and in October, the Gang of Four was arrested, putting an end to the Cultural Revolution.

During the Boluan Fanzheng period, Xi Zhongxun, then Provincial Secretary of the CCP in Guangdong, was in charge of the rehabilitation of the victims, receiving support from the Central Committee of CCP. In January 1980, the Guangdong Revolutionary Committee was removed and the People's Government of Guangdong was re-established. In 1981, Huang Yongsheng was sentenced to 18 years in prison and died in 1983.

== See also ==
- Guangxi Massacre
- Laogai
- Five Black Categories
- List of massacres in China
- Mass killings under communist regimes
- Boluan Fanzheng
- Reforms and Opening-up
