= Zheng Yi (writer) =

Chinese writer

- 郑光召 Zheng Guangzhao
- Born: March 10, 1947 (age 79); Chongqing
- Citizenship: China
- Notable work: Laojing

Zheng Yi (Chinese: 郑义; born 10 March, 1947) is a Chinese writer and a notable figure of the scar literature. Zheng served as the president of Shanxi Branch of the China Film Association, and the president of the Independent Chinese PEN Center. Zheng's well-known works include Feng (The Maples), Old Well, Scarlet Memorial, and so on. In particular, Feng and Old Well were adapted to films, which won the best film (Tokyo Grand Prix) in 1987 Tokyo International Film Festival and the best film in 1988 Hundred Flowers Awards, respectively. Zheng moved to Hong Kong and then to the United States after the Tiananmen Square Massacre in 1989.

== Biography ==
Zheng Yi was born in Chongqing in March 1947. He grew up in Beijing and participated in the Cultural Revolution as a Red Guard, graduating from Tsinghua University High School in 1968. He subsequently lived in Shanxi, Northeast China, and Inner Mongolia. Zheng entered the Jinzhong Normal Junior College (晋中师专) in 1977 after the Cultural Revolution.

In 1979, Zheng published short story Feng (The Maples), describing violent struggles among Red Guards and rebel factions during the Cultural Revolution, and the film adaption of the novel was released in 1980. After graduating from college, Zheng became a journal editor in the Jinzhong Branch of the China Federation of Literary and Art Circles in 1981. He then published novella Distant Village (远村), which won the Best Novella Award in China in 1984, and Old Well, which was later adapted to film and won the best film (Tokyo Grand Prix) in 1987 Tokyo International Film Festival.

However, Zheng Yi was wanted by the Chinese government for his active participation in the student movement in Tiananmen Square in 1989. He and his wife Bei Ming (北明), who is also a writer, were arrested and detained until March 1990, and they fled to Hong Kong in 1992 and then to the United States in 1993.

In July 1993, Zheng Yi's book Scarlet Memorial: Tales of Cannibalism in Modern China was published by Huashi in Taiwan; the book documented the massive cannibalism in Guangxi Massacre during the Cultural Revolution, becoming an instant best-seller. In 2001, Zheng became the founding Vice President of the Independent Chinese PEN Center (独立中文笔会), affiliated with the PEN International, and was elected its president in 2007.

== See also ==
- Guangxi Massacre
- Tiananmen Square Massacre
- Scar literature
