= Collective Killings in Rural China during the Cultural Revolution =

Book by Su Yang

- Author: Su Yang (苏阳)
- Language: English, Chinese
- Subject: Cultural Revolution
- Published: 2011 (English, Cambridge University Press, United Kingdom); 2017 (Chinese, CUHK Press, Hong Kong)
- Pages: 300
- ISBN: 9780511762574

Collective Killings in Rural China during the Cultural Revolution is a book by Chinese historian Su Yang (苏阳). The book presents detailed analysis on the massive killings in the rural areas in mainland China during the Chinese Cultural Revolution (1966–1976). Originally published by the Cambridge University Press in 2011, the book received the 2012 Barrington Moore Book Award by the American Sociological Association. The book was later translated into Chinese by Song Xi (宋熙), and the Chinese edition was published by the Chinese University of Hong Kong Press in 2017.

== Summary ==
The book, Collective Killings in Rural China during the Cultural Revolution, was originally published in 2011 by the Cambridge University Press. By studying over 1,500 official county gazetteers as well as other unpublished investigative reports and his own interviews with villagers, Su Yang (based in UC Irvine) systematically recorded and analyzed in his book the collective killings in rural area of China during the Cultural Revolution.

In the book, Su focuses on Guangxi and Guangdong provinces, where the largest number of killings took place during the Chinese Cultural Revolution (Guangxi Massacre and Guangdong Massacre), and the first four years of the Revolution (1966–1969). Su further proposed the "community model" to explain the occurrence of these collective killings, and challenged the applicability of the mainstream "state policy model" in conventional genocide studies. The two models differ in a number of ways; for instance, even though Su recognizes the state as an essential actor, he argues that the state played a reduced role of indirect impetus for the collective killings, and that the whole community was responsible for the collective killings instead of just the individual leaders and perpetrators.

== Reception ==
The book received the 2012 Barrington Moore Book Award by the American Sociological Association. Frank Dikotter called the book "a truly terrific book" and "long overdue too", and that Su "has written a model of rigorous scholarship that squarely places the Cultural Revolution where it should have been all along, in the area of genocide studies on a par with Rwanda, as villagers turned against villagers, slaughtering each other in the hundreds of thousands." Dingxin Zhao praised the book as "an outstanding work in the study of the Cultural Revolution and the politics of the Chinese communist regime, genocide study, and social movement research." Joel Andreas commented that "Su has produced a serious scholarly investigation" and that "he is genuinely concerned with understanding the complex causes of the wave of rural killing that accompanied the Cultural Revolution and, using the theoretical and methodological tools of a sociologist, he has put together a sophisticated and insightful explanation."

Greg Procknow thought Su's book "stands as an important corrective to a depiction of Cultural Revolution killings as occurring mostly in urban areas", but he also argued that there were a number of shortcomings in the work. For example, Procknow argued that "Su falls short in detailing the impact of the 1966 party directive, Decision concerning the Great Proletarian Cultural Revolution, in manipulating local actors to murder their neighbours without compunction." In addition, Jeremy Brown said Su "deserves great credit for uncovering the collective killings and for his penetrating analysis of their multiple causes", but he also commented that "it is therefore unfortunate that such a significant book suffers from flaws in its presentation."

== See also ==
- Five Black Categories
- Guangxi Massacre
- Guangdong Cultural Revolution Massacre
- Genocide studies
- Massacres during the Cultural Revolution
- Scarlet Memorial
