= Qinghai 223 Incident =

Qinghai, where some of China's main nuclear sites locate, including Lop Nur.

The Qinghai 223 Incident (Chinese: 青海二二三事件), also known as the February 23 Qinghai Incident or the Qinghai 223 massacre, was a massacre in 1967 during the Chinese Cultural Revolution in Qinghai Province. On February 23, 1967, thirteen military companies from the Qinghai Military District of the People's Liberation Army attacked and took over the base of Qinghai Daily which was previously occupied by the local unarmed rebel group, killing 169 civilians (and 4 soldiers) and injuring 178 within one day. An additional 12 students were killed or injured at Qinghai Ethnical College on February 24. The massacre was led by General Zhao Yongfu (赵永夫), the deputy commander of the military district, and therefore the incident was also known as the "Zhao Yongfu incident".

== History ==
In May 1966, Mao Zedong launched the Cultural Revolution in mainland China. Starting from the January Storm in 1967, rebel groups began to seize power from local governments and Communist Party committees. In Qinghai Province, a conservative faction and a rebel faction (known as "8·18") were formed, with the former supporting Wang Zhao, who was the governor of Qinghai at the time, and the latter against Wang.

In January 1967, the "8·18" rebel faction took over the building of Qinghai's provincial newspaper, Qinghai Daily. However, Beijing soon authorized military control of newspapers and radio stations, and Qinghai Military District then sent troops attempting to re-gain control of the newspaper base. From February 14 to 22, the military besieged the newspaper base while the rebel civilians refused to submit to the military, and thus on February 23, the military under General Zhao Yongfu declared city-wide martial law in Xining and moved on to seize the newspaper building by force, but claiming that the rebel civilians opened fire on troops first.

On February 23 alone, 169 unarmed civilians were killed by the People's Liberation Army, and 178 were injured. By mistake, the military itself also shot 4 soldiers dead and injured over 20. On February 24, another 12 students were killed or injured at Qinghai Ethnical College. The rebel group "8·18" was immediately categorized as "counter-revolutionary" by the military, with 13,414 members arrested; in addition, 5,968 members of the rebel group had their homes ransacked.

However, on March 24, 1967, Chinese premier Zhou Enlai read out the Decision from Beijing regarding the Qinghai Issue, which stated that Zhao Yongfu had used conspiratorial methods to usurp military power which constituted a "counter-revolutionary coup" within the provincial military district leadership. Members of the "8·18" group were subsequently released and rehabilitated in 1967.

== See also ==
- Massacres during the Cultural Revolution
- February Countercurrent
- Violent Struggle
- Red Guards
- List of massacres in China
- Mass killings under communist regimes
