= List of massacres in China =

The following is a list of massacres that have occurred in China. The massacres are grouped for different time periods.

This includes British Hong Kong and the Hong Kong Special Administrative Region, as well as Portuguese Macau and the Macau Special Administrative Region.

== Imperial China (before 1912) ==
Name	Date (Dynasty)	Location	Deaths	Notes
Changping massacre	260 BC	Gaoping, Shanxi	450,000	450,000 Zhao soldiers were killed during and after the battle; all survivors were killed (buried alive) with the exceptions of 240 of the youngest soldiers who were released
Xin'an massacre	207 BC	Xin'an (present-day Yima, Henan)	200,000	200,000 troops from Zhang Han's army surrendered and were buried alive
Massacre of the Eunuchs	22 September 189	Luoyang	2,000+	Two thousand eunuchs in the palace are slaughtered in a violent purge in Luoyang, the capital of Han.
Cao Cao's invasion of Xu Province	193	Jiangsu	100,000 civilians	Cao Cao's army killed over 100,000 civilians, including both men and women
Guandu massacre	200	Wuchao (in present-day Yanjin County, Henan)	70.000 - 80.000	After the Battle of Guandu, Cao Cao buried all the surrendered soldiers alive.
Yongjia disaster	13–14 July 311 (Jin)	Luoyang	30,000, exaggerated and many Sogdian and Indian foreigner diaspora residing in Luoyang also died in the disaster.	The capital was sacked in the disaster, an landmark incident in the Upheaval of the Five Barbarians. The deaths of 30,000 was based on the Book of Jin compiled in 648. All Sogdians and Indians living in Luoyang were killed during the disaster.
Jie genocide in the Ran Wei–Later Zhao War	350–352 (Later Zhao and Ran Wei)	Northern China	More than 200,000 Jie people and other "barbarians"	Ran Min massacred over 200,000 Jie people and other "barbarians". Non-Han in general were targeted by Ran Min's forces.
Canhebei massacre	8 December 395	Canhe Slope (in modern Liangcheng)	40,000 - 50,000	Between 40,000 and 50,000 Yan soldiers who later surrendered were all buried, presumably still alive.
Yangzhou merchants massacre	760 (Tang)	Yangzhou	thousands	Merchants from the Abbasid Caliphate such as Arabs, Persians and other foreigners were killed. It coincided with the An Lushan Rebellion.
Fanyang massacre	761 (Tang)	Fanyang (Jicheng (Beijing))	?	Many foreign Sogdians and other Central Asians (known as "Hu" barbarians) were massacred by Gao Juren, a general of Goguryeo origin.
Massacre of Uyghur Manichaeans and Huichang persecution of Buddhism	13 February 843–845	Shahu in	10,000 Uyghurs were killed at Shahu by Tang armies, more Manichaean priests massacred after Shahu and more Uyghurs were killed by the Yenisei Kyrgyz	Tang dynasty general Shi Xiong slaughtered 10,000 Uyghur Manichaeans at Shahu on 13 February 843 and then the Tang dynasty launched the Huichang persecution of Buddhism where Manichaean priests were slaughtered. Another Tang dynasty general Liu Mian massacred the remaining Uyghur troops. The Yenisei Kyrgyz Khaganate helped the Tang dynasty massacre Uyghurs on the Mongolia steppe.
Guangzhou merchants massacre	878–879 (Tang)	Guangzhou	Tens of thousands. (modern estimate) 120–200,000 (primary source)	Merchants from the Abbasid Caliphate such as Muslim Arabs, Persians, Zoroastrians, Jews and Christians were killed.
Mongol conquest of the Jin dynasty	1211–1234 (Song)	Northern China	Several million Han and Jurchen people	Genghis Khan and his sons waged war against the Jurchens in the Jin dynasty and after siege of Kaifeng (1232) they massacred Jurchens of the imperial family, Wanyan.
Mongol conquest of Western Xia	1225–1227	now Ningxia and Gansu	Several million Tangut people	Genghis Khan ordered genocidal extermination of the Tangut people in Western Xia after they betrayed him and rebelled.
First Sichuan massacre	1221–1264 (Song)	Sichuan	2 million est.	Part of Mongol conquest of the Song dynasty.
Ispah Quanzhou massacres	1357–1366 (Yuan)	Quanzhou	?	Yuan dynasty loyalists led by Chen Youding massacred Hui Semu Muslims who rebelled against Yuan rule.
Gure (古哷 Gǔlè) massacre	1583 (Ming)	Gure (古哷 Gǔlè)	?	The Jianzhou Jurchens Giocangga and his son Taksi are massacred by Nikan Wailan. Taksi's son Nurhaci blames the Jianzhou Jurchen's Ming rulers for the massacre and starts building up his followers in preparation for revolt against the Ming.
Second Sichuan massacre	1645–1646 (Qing)	Sichuan	1 million est.	There is no reliable figure, but estimated 1 million out of 3 million Sichuanese were massacred mainly by the army of Zhang Xianzhong.
Yangzhou massacre	1645 (Qing)	Yangzhou	300,000 (modern estimate)	The Yangzhou massacre in May, 1645 in Yangzhou, Qing dynasty China, refers to the mass killings of innocent civilians by Manchu and defected Han Chinese soldiers, commanded by the Manchu general Dodo. Defected southern Han Chinese made up the majority in addition to the Eight Banner Han forces. The massacre is described in a contemporary account, A Record of Ten Days in Yangzhou, by Wang Xiuchu which is the account that exaggerated the figure to 800,000.
Three massacres in Jiading	1645 (Qing)	Jiading District	100,000	People living in Jiading due to refusal to switch to the queue hairstyle were slaughtered by Han defectors in the Green Standard army led by Li Chengdong
Jinhua massacre	1646 (Qing)	Jinhua	60,000	People living in Jiading due to refusal to switch to the queue hairstyle were slaughtered by Han defectors in the Green Standard army led by Li Chengdong
Massacre of Muslims loyal to the Ming in Gansu	1649 (Qing)	Gansu	100,000 Muslims loyal to the Ming	100,000 Muslims loyal to the Ming dynasty were massacred by Qing Eight banner armies.
Sino-Russian border conflicts	1650–1653 (Qing)	Dauriya	Several thousand Daur people	Russian explorer Yerofey Khabarov leads Russian Cossacks to massacre Daur men and take Daur girls and women as concubines before being fought off by the Qing.
massacre of Dutch prisoners	1661–1662 (Southern Ming)	Taiwan	?	Koxinga ordered the mass execution of Dutch male prisoners on Taiwan
Chahar Mongol rebellion	1675 (Qing)	Inner Mongolia	Several thousand Chahar Mongols	Manchus massacred Chahar Mongol rebels led by Abunai and his son Borni. Abunei was Ejei Khan's brother. Manchus then massacred all male members of Abunai and Borni's particular branch of the Borjigin family after killing them.
Tibetan civil war of 1727–1728	1727–1728 (Qing)	Tibet	?	Tibetan rebels were massacred by Manchus
Lhasa riot of 1750	1750 (Qing)	Tibet	?	Tibetan rebels massacred Manchu officials and soldiers and Manchus crushed the uprising and executed the Tibetan rebels by torture.
Dzungar genocide	1755–1757 (Qing)	Dzungar Khanate	480,000	The Qing Dynasty's army slaughtered 80% of the Oirat Mongols.
Uqturpan massacre	1765 (Qing)	Uqturpan County	Several thousand Uyghurs	Manchu army slaughtered several thousand Uyghurs.
Jahriyya revolt	1781 (Qing)	Qinghai and Gansu	Several thousand Muslims	Manchu army slaughtered several thousand Muslims.
Nerbudda incident	10 August 1842	Taiwan Prefecture	197 British and Indian prisoners of war	On 10 August 1842, 187 British and Indian prisoners of war captured by Chinese forces from the troopship Nerbudda and brig Ann were summarily executed on the orders of the Daoguang Emperor in retaliation for the Chinese defeat at the Battle of Ningpo.
Taiping massacres of Manchus	December 1850 – August 1864 (Qing)	mid and lower Yangtze valley	tens of thousands of Manchus	Taiping rebels slaughtered Manchus and wiped them out entirely in many garrisons in the Yangtze region.
Ningpo massacre	26 June 1857	Ningbo	40 Portuguese pirates	Cantonese pirates led by Ah Pak killed 40 Portuguese pirates.
Dungan Revolt	1862–1873 (Qing)	Provinces of Shaanxi and Gansu	?	Due to a combination of massacres, famine, war/famine migration and corpse-transmitted plague, Gansu lost 74.5% (14.55 million) of its population while Shaanxi lost 44.6% (6.2 million) of its population. Not all "loss" were massacres. Besides the dead, some Hui from Shaanxi permanently moved to Gansu while other Hui from both Shaanxi and Gansu permanently left China and moved to Russian controlled Central Asia.
Suzhou massacre	December 1863	Suzhou, Jiangsu	20,000-40,000	Massacre of POWs by Huai Army led by Li Hongzhang
Jindandao incident	1891 (Qing)	Inner Mongolia	150,000 – 500,000	Hundreds of thousands of Mongols of Inner Mongolia were slaughtered in the Jindandao incident
Port Arthur massacre	1894, 21 November (Qing)	Lüshunkou, Liaoning	2600–20,000	2,600 civilians were slaughtered within the city, while those slaughtered in the hills surrounding the city had no reliable count. In November 1948, the Chinese Communist Party built a cemetery and marked the total deaths to be 20,000, which include soldiers killed in action and fleeing soldiers disguised as civilians. The 20,000 figure became the orthodox figure in communist sources.
Kucheng massacre	August 1, 1895	Gutian (at that time known in the west as Kucheng), Fujian	11	A Fasting folk religious group attacked British missionaries who were then taking summer holidays at Gutian Huashan, killing eleven people and destroying two houses.
Second Dungan Revolt	1895–1896 (Qing)	Provinces of Qinghai and Gansu	100,000	Second Dungan Revolt (Chinese: 乙未河湟事变) was a rebellion of various Chinese Muslim ethnic groups in Qinghai and Gansu against the Qing dynasty, that originated because of a violent dispute between two Sufi orders of the same sect. The Wahhabi-inspired Yihewani organization then joined in and encouraged the revolt, which was crushed by loyalist Muslims. In Xunhua, Qinghai, masses of Hui, Dongxiang, Bao'an, and Salars were incited to revolt against the Qing by the Multicoloured Mosque leader Ma Yonglin. Soldiers were ordered to destroy the rebels by Brigadier General Tang Yanhe. Ma Dahan arranged a deal with the fellow Dongxiang Ma Wanfu when rebelling against the Qing dynasty. In Hezhou, Didao, and Xunhua they directed their adherents to join the rebellion.
Massacres of Manchus in Beijing during the Boxer rebellion and Blagoveshchensk massacre and Sixty-Four Villages East of the River massacre	1900 (Qing)	Beijing, Aigun, Blagoveshchensk	Tens of thousands of Manchus and Daur people	Boxer rebels massacre foreigners, then the foreign Eight Nation Alliance massacres Manchus in Beijing and a separate all Russian force massacres Manchus in Aigun and massacres Manchus and Daur people in Blagoveshchensk during the Russian invasion of Manchuria
Shaanxi Uprising	1911–1912 (Qing)	Wuhan in Hubei, Zhenjiang in Jiangsu, Taiyuan in Shanxi and Xi'an in Shaanxi	Tens of thousands of Manchus	Hui and Han Chinese revolutionaries massacred Manchus in Zhenjiang, Taiyuan, Xi'an, Wuhan and many other places across China, with the death toll of Manchus at Xi'an in the tens of thousands.

== Republic of China (since 1912) ==
=== 1912–1937 ===
Name	Date	Location	Victims	Notes
Longjing Manse Movement	March 13, 1919	Longjing, Jilin, Republic of China	17 or 19	Unarmed Korean peaceful protestors were fired on by Chinese soldiers under warlord Zhang Zuolin, which caused 17 or 19 deaths and around 30 injuries
Gando massacre	October 1920 – April 1921	Jiandao, Eastern Manchuria	5,000	During this period, soldiers of the Imperial Japanese Army murdered Korean civilians who numbered an estimated at least 5,000 and perpetrated widespread rape.
Shakee Massacre	23 June 1925	Shaji, Guangzhou	50	50 direct deaths. On June 21, 1925, workers in Hong Kong and Canton went on strike in support of the May Thirtieth Movement in Shanghai. Two days later, on June 23, over 100,000 people convened in Eastern Jiaochang, announcing their plans to expel the foreign powers, cancel the unequal treaties and walk to the Shakee in protest. At 3 am, when the protest had moved to the west bridge, British and French embassy guards, after gunshots were fired at them, fired back at the protesters. In addition, British, French and Portuguese warships bombarded the north coast of Shamian. Over 50 were killed and more than 170 were seriously injured.
March 18 Massacre	18 March 1926	Beijing	47	47 direct deaths. Duan Qirui, who was worried about the situation becoming destabilized, ordered armed military police to disperse the protesters. The confrontation led to violence, in which 47 protesters were killed and more than 200 injured.
Shanghai massacre of 1927	1927, 12 April	Shanghai	1200	300–400 direct deaths. Five thousand missing
Autumn Harvest Uprising	September 7, 1927	Hunan, Jiangxi and Hubei	390,000	
Kuomintang anti-communist massacre	1928	Nationwide in China	40,643~310,000	
Muslim massacres of Tibetans in Jonê and Xiahe	1928	Jonê County and Xiahe County Gansu	?	Tibetans in Labrang Monastery were massacred by Muslim Hui and Salar soldiers.
Golok massacres	1917–1949	Qinghai and Gansu	?	Tibetan Goloks and Hui Muslims repeatedly fought each other for decades with huge massacres of Goloks occurring several times
Anti-Bolshevik League incident	May 1930 – 1931	Jiangxi–Fujian Soviet	5000	5000 direct deaths conducted by Mao Zedong. Mao Zedong accused his political rivals of belonging to the Kuomintang intelligence agency "Anti-Bolshevik League". Mao's political purge resulted in killings at Futian and elsewhere, and the trial and execution of Red Army officers and soldiers.
Futian incident	December 1930 – December 1931	Jiangxi–Fujian Soviet	200	200 direct deaths conducted by Mao Zedong. The Futian battalion's leaders had mutinied against Mao Zedong's purge of the Jiangxi Action Committee, ordered on the pretext of its alleged connection to the Anti-Bolshevik League and ties to Trotskyism.
Communist purge in Jiangxi–Fujian Soviet	1931–1935	Provinces of Jiangxi and Fujian	<700,000	According to census, 700,000 died in the 15 counties under the Jiangxi–Fujian Soviet. Some scholars attribute all the deaths to the regime.
Pingdingshan massacre	1932, 16 September	Pingdingshan	800–1200	800–1200 direct deaths conducted by Japanese military.
Kizil massacre	1933, June	near Kashgar, Xinjiang	800	An estimated 800 Chinese Muslim and Chinese civilians were killed by Turkic Muslim fighters.
Minsaengdan incident	1933 to 1936	Manchuria	500	The Minsaengdan incident, or Min-Sheng-T'uan Incident, was a series of purges occurring between 1933 and 1936 in which the Chinese Communist Party (CCP) arrested, expelled, and killed Koreans in Manchuria, based on the suspicion that the purged Koreans were supporting the Japanese occupiers as part of the pro-Japanese and anti-communist group, Minsaengdan. The CCP arrested and expelled over 1,000 of its Korean members and killed 500 during the purges.
Kashgar massacre	1934	Kashgar, Xinjiang	1,700–2,000	Estimates are that 1,700 to 2,000 Uighur civilians were killed in revenge by Hui Muslims for the Kizil massacre.

=== 1937–1945 (Second Sino-Japanese War) ===
Name	Date	Location	Victims	Notes	Ref.
Tongzhou mutiny	29 July 1937	Tongzhou District, Beijing	?	Chinese collaborationist troops of the East Hebei Army turned against the Japanese and massacre Japanese forces in revenge for Japanese planes bombing their barracks when they refused to attack fellow Chinese.	
Zhengding Missionary Murder	9 October 1937	Zhengding, Hebei province	9	Kidnapping and Murder of nine Catholic priests by Japanese troops	
Datong Mass Grave	1937–1945	Datong, Shanxi	155,000+	Japanese military caused deaths of between 60,000 and over 155,000 laborers working in coal mines around Datong.	
Nanjing Massacre	13 December 1937 to 1938	Nanjing, Jiangsu	100,000~300,000	40,000 were massacred within Nanjing City Walls, mostly within the first five days; while the total victims massacred as of the end of March 1938 in both Nanjing and its surrounding six rural counties "far exceed 100,000 but fall short of 200,000".	
1938 Changsha fire	13 November 1938	Changsha	30,000	Kuomintang officials ordered the city be set on fire to prevent the Japanese from benefiting from its capture.	
Three Alls Policy	1940–1942	North China	2.7 million	Scorched earth policy conducted by Japanese military.	
Panjiayu Massacre	1941, 25 January	Panjiayu, Hebei	1298	Scorched earth policy conducted by Japanese military as part of the Three Alls Policy.	
St. Stephen's College massacre	1941, 25 December	British Hong Kong	100	100 people killed by Japanese military.	
Zhejiang-Jiangxi massacres	1942, 15 May – 4 September	Provinces of Zhejiang and Jiangxi	250,000	Conducted by Japanese military as retaliation for Chinese civilians giving shelter to American pilots after the Doolittle Raid.	
Changjiao massacre	1943, 9–12 May	Changjiao, Hunan	30,000	Conducted by the Japanese military.	
Nanshitou Massacre	1942–1945	Nanshitou Refugee Camp, Guangzhou	100,000	At least 100,000 deaths caused by Japanese military. Biological weapons and human experimentation involved.	
Yan'an Rectification Movement	1942–1945	Yan'an, Shaanxi		A mass movement launched by Mao Zedong and the Chinese Communist Party that led to numerous executions. Regarded by many as the origin of Mao Zedong's cult of personality.	
Gegenmiao massacre	14 August 1945	Gegenmiao, Horqin Right Front Banner of the Hinggan League of Inner Mongolia.	1,800	During its invasion of Manchuria, the Soviet Red Army massacred fleeing Japanese refugees at the town of Gegenmiao.	

=== 1945–1949 (Civil War) ===
Name	Location	Date	Victims	Notes	Ref.
February 28 incident	Taiwan Province	1947, 28 February – 16 May	Roughly 8,000	The Kuomintang responded to a revolt by native Taiwanese by beginning a campaign of repression.	
Siege of Changchun	Jilin Province	1948, 23 May – 19 October 1948	120,000 to 330,000 civilian deaths due to starvation	The civilian population of Changchun was caught between the besieging People's Liberation Army (PLA) and the occupying Republic of China Armed Forces (ROCAF). The PLA cut off food from entering the city by land, and while the ROCAF could be supplied by air, the civilian population could not. Neither side accepted responsibility for feeding the civilians and they died from starvation and exposure in the no-man's-land between the two armies.	

=== 1949–present ===
Name	Date	Location	Victims	Notes	Ref.
Lieyu Massacre	1987, 7–8 March	Lieyu, Kinmen	24	Launched by Republic of China Army, followed by evidence destroyed and denial with cover-up measures.	

== People's Republic of China (since 1949) ==
=== 1949–1966 ===
Name	Date	Location	Victims	Notes
Ili Han Massacre (1949)	1949	Gulja (Yining), Xinjiang	Over 7,000 Han Chinese civilians	Mass killing of Han Chinese civilians by Second East Turkestan Republic forces.
Chinese land reform	1949–1953	Nationwide	1 million – 4.7 million	Launched by Mao Zedong and the Chinese Communist Party (CCP). Liquidation of the landlord class in struggle sessions.
Campaign to Suppress Counterrevolutionaries	1950–1953	Nationwide	712,000 – 2 million	Launched by Mao Zedong and CCP.
Three-anti and Five-anti campaigns	1951–1952	Nationwide	100,000+	Exact death toll is unknown. In Shanghai alone, from 25 January to 1 April 1952, at least 876 people committed suicide. Launched by Mao Zedong and CCP.
1954 Cathay Pacific Douglas DC-4 shootdown	1954, 23 July	South China Sea, off the coast of Hainan Island	10	Airliner shootdown By People's Liberation Army Air Force, 10 of the 19 on board died
Sufan movement	1955–1957	Nationwide	53,000	Launched by Mao Zedong and CCP
Anti-Rightist Campaign	1957–1959	Nationwide	550,000 – 2 million	Exact death toll is unknown. Official statistics shows that at least 550,000 people were purged and many died. Launched by Mao Zedong and CCP.
Xunhua Incident	1958	Qinghai	435	The massacre was conducted by People's Liberation Army towards local civilians.
1959 Tibetan uprising	1959	Tibet	87,000	The exact number of deaths has been disputed.
Violence in the Great Chinese Famine	1959–1961	Nationwide	2.5 million (total death around 20 million)	Killings occurred during the Great Chinese Famine. According to Frank Dikötter, at least 2.5 million (2–3 million) people were beaten or tortured to death, which accounted for 6–8% of the total deaths in the famine.
Socialist Education Movement	1963–1965	Nationwide	77,560	Launched by Mao Zedong.

=== 1966–1976 (Cultural Revolution) ===
Cultural Revolution was launched by Mao Zedong in May 1966, with the help of the Cultural Revolution Group. Estimates of total deaths during the Cultural Revolution generally range from 500,000 to 2,000,000.

Some Chinese researchers have estimated that at least 300,000 people were killed in massacres during the Cultural Revolution. Massacres in Guangxi Province and Guangdong Province were among the most serious: in Guangxi, the official annals of at least 43 counties report massacres with 15 of them recording a death toll of over 1,000, while in Guangdong at least 28 counties report massacres with 6 of them seeing over 1,000 deaths. The following table only includes major massacres which have been well documented in literature.

Name	Date	Location	Victims	Notes
Red August	August – September 1966	Beijing	1,772	Origin of the Red Terror in Chinese Cultural Revolution, triggering Daxing Massacre which killed 325 people in a few days. Statistics from 1985 showed a death toll of over 10,000 due to the Red August.
Guangxi Massacre	1966–1976	Guangxi	100,000 – 150,000	Massive cannibalism occurred.
Inner Mongolia incident	1967–1969	Inner Mongolia	16,632 – 100,000	Mostly Mongols.
Qinghai 223 Incident	February 1967	Qinghai	173	Conducted by People's Liberation Army.
Guangzhou Laogai Fan Incident	August 1967	Guangzhou, Guangdong	187–197	Part of the Guangdong Massacre. Caused by the rumor that Laogaifan (prisoners of Laogai) were released. Local citizens began massive killings as self-defense.
Anti-Peng Pai Incident	August 1967	Shanwei, Guangdong	>160	Targeted the relatives of Peng Pai.
Qingtongxia Incident	August 1967	Qingtongxia, Ningxia	101	Conducted by People's Liberation Army.
Yangjiang Massacre	1967–1969	Yangjiang, Guangdong	3,573	Part of the Guangdong Massacre. Mainly in Yangjiang and Yangchun.
Daoxian massacre	August – October 1967	Daoxian, Hunan	9,093	Took place in more than 10 counties, mainly in Dao County.
Shaoyang County Massacre	July – September 1968	Shaoyang, Hunan	991	Influenced by Daoxian Massacre.
Dan County Massacre	August 1968	Danzhou, Hainan	>700	Part of the Guangdong Massacre. Over 50,000 people were jailed and thousands were permanently disabled. Conducted by People's Liberation Army and local militias.
Ruijin Massacre	September –October 1968	Ruijin, Jiangxi	>1000	Took place in Ruijin County, Xingguo County, and Yudu County.
Zhao Jianmin Spy Case	1968–1969	Yunnan	17,000	Over 1.3 million people persecuted. Part of the Chinese Cultural Revolution.
Shadian incident	July – August 1975	Yunnan	1,600	Uprising of Hui people. Conducted by People's Liberation Army.

=== 1976–1999 ===
Name	Date	Location	Victims	Notes
Chinese destroyer Guangzhou (160) Explosion	1978 9 March	Zhanjiang Port, Guangdong Province	135 (including the perpetrator)	The sinking of the ship Guangzhou killed 134 sailors and officers and injured 28 in the Chinese navy. The tragedy in the Zhanjiang harbor followed an explosion of depth charges in the Guangzhou's arsenal, more than two hours earlier, caused by Lieutnenant Lai Sanyang, an ordnance expert who been dismissed from the Chinese Navy.
Beijing railway station bombing	1980, 29 October	Beijing	10 (including the perpetrator)	Wang Zhigang, a worker at a tractor factory, caused a spontaneous explosion in the south corridor of the second floor of the Beijing railway station due to a romantic dispute, killing 9 people and injuring 81–89
Anne Anne Kindergarten stabbing	1982, 3 June	Un Chau Estate, Sham Shui Po, Kowloon, British Hong Kong	6	After killing his mother and sister in their flat in Un Chau Estate, and also wounding two other women, 28-year-old Lee Chi-hang entered Anne Anne Kindergarten and stabbed 34 children, killing four of them, and also injured several other people, before he was arrested by police
Rape and murder case in Xiguitu Banner of Hulunbuir League	1983, 16 June	Yakeshi, Hulunbuir, Inner Mongolia	27	8 minors commit murders and rapes in Hongqigou Farm, The incident directly triggered the Anti-crime Campaign
Eight Immortals Restaurant murders	1985, 4 August	Iao Hon, Portuguese Macau	10	Chinese gambler Huang Zhiheng murdered a family of ten in the Eight Immortals Restaurant in Portuguese Macau. He stabbed or strangled each of his victims to death before dismembering their bodies and disposing of their remains in the ocean and dumpsters
Tibetan unrest	1987–1989	Tibet	10–400	Official source states the death toll between 10 and 20, but other estimates range from dozens to hundreds.
1989 Tiananmen Square protests and massacre	1989, 4 June	Tiananmen Square, Beijing	200–10,000	Between 200 and 10,000 civilians were killed. The Red Cross states that around 2,600 died and the official Chinese government figure is 241 dead with 7,000 wounded. Amnesty International's estimates puts the number of deaths at several hundred to close to 1,000. As many as 10,000 people were estimated to have been arrested during the protests.
Chongqing shooting	1993, 5 April	Chongqing, Sichuan	9 (including the perpetrator)	3 Injured
Thousand Island Lake robbery killings	1994, 31 March	Zhejiang Province	32	Twenty-four Taiwanese tourists, 6 crew members and 2 mainland Chinese passengers on board the Hai Rui sightseeing cruise were robbed and murdered. The incident cast a shadow over cross-strait relations.
Jianguomen Incident	1994, 20 September	Jianguomen, Beijing	30 dead, 30-100+ wounded	Tian Mingjian, angered by the death of his wife during a forced abortion, retrieved an assault rifle from the weapons vault in his army base, and shot to death 6 soldiers and officers. He then stole a jeep and drove to Jianguo Gate, where he shot and killed 23 civilians, and injured at least 30 others, before being shot by a military sniper.
Zhaodong massacre	1995, 18 November	Zhaodong, Heilongjiang province	34 dead, 16 injured	On the night of November 18, 1995, a mass shooting occurred in Zhaodong, Heilongjiang. Two suspects, 26-year-old Feng Wanhai and 22-year-old Jiang Liming, armed with a double-barreled shotgun and a small-bore rifle, opened fire at 48 people, killing 32 people and wounding 16 others. 37 families were affected by the incident.
Ghulja massacre	1997, February 3–5	Yining, Xinjiang	10–200	Government sources state the death toll at 10, but other estimates range into the hundreds.
1997 Ürümqi bus bombings	1997, February 25	Ürümqi, Xinjiang	9 (including 3 children)	Uyghyr separatists bombed three buses, killing 9 people, including 3 children, and injuring 28. Another bomb was found at the main railway station but was defused. The bombings were a response to the Ghulja incident in which the Chinese army killed several Uyghur protestors
Long wins round robbery	1998, November 15	Shanwei	23	Guangdong Province, Shanwei City, the territory of an armed robbery case, the Hong Kong shipping company "Changsheng" million tons of cargo ship on which 23 Chinese expatriate crew were all killed and their corpses dumped into the sea.

=== 2000–present ===
Name	Date	Location	Victims	Notes
2001 Shijiazhuang bombings	2001, 16 March	Shijiazhuang, Hebei	108	Jin Ruchao motivated by hatred of his ex-wife and her family detonated ammonium nitrate bombs at four locations across Shijiazhuang, killing 108 people and injuring 38 others
Mafang Village explosion	2001, 16 July	Mafang Village, Nanniwan, Baota District, Yan'an, Shaanxi	89+	On July 16, 2001, an embittered villager Ma Hongqing ignited ammonium nitrate explosives in a rival's warehouse. The explosion leveled much of the village and killed at least 89 people, and injured 98 others
2008 Tibetan unrest	2008, 16 March	Tibet	23–400	In order to commemorate the 49th anniversary of the armed uprising on 10 March 1959, some Tibetan demonstrators protested collectively in Tibetan areas of China and parts of southern Tibet. However, it later evolved into Tibetan attacks on civilians such as Han and Hui civilians and shops, cars, the Lhasa Great Mosque and other civilian facilities.
2008 Kashgar attack	2008, 4 August	Kashgar, Xinjiang	17	Two men drove an attack on the armed police of the border guard detachment of Kashgar, which was in operation. A total of 17 People's Armed Police were killed and 15 injured.
July 2009 Ürümqi riots	2009, 5 July	Ürümqi	197	At first it was just a demonstration, which later evolved into a series of violent attacks by Uyghurs against non-Muslim ethnic groups such as the Han. At least more than 1,000 Uyghurs participated in the riot on the first day of the incident. A total of 197 people died, most of whom were Hans, with 1,721 others injured, and a large number of vehicles and buildings were destroyed.
2011 Hotan attack	2011, 18 July	Hotan, Xinjiang	18	18 young Uyghur men stormed a police station and killed two security guards by stabbing and lobbing molotov cocktails. They occupied the police station, took eight hostages, and smashed and set fire to the station. Shouting slogans and unfurling banners with Jihadi writing, they refused to negotiate and engaged in a firefight with police. The attack ended within 90 minutes when police shot 14 attackers dead. Authorities detained four attackers and rescued six hostages, however two were killed.
2012 Yecheng attack	2012, 28 February	Yecheng, Xinjiang	13	A group of eight Uyghur men led by religious extremist Abudukeremu Mamuti attacked pedestrians with axes and knives on Happiness Road. Seven terrorists were killed on the spot by the police, while the other one was injured and died after rescue. One police officer died and 4 police were injured, while 15 pedestrians died from Mamuti's assault and 14 more civilians were injured.
April 2013 Bachu unrest	2013, 24 April	Selibuya, Bachu, Xinjiang	21	It was an incident of ethnic clash that took place between Muslim Uyghur and Han Chinese community. As reported by BBC 21 people were killed in the incident including 15 police officers and local government officials.
June 2013 Shanshan riots	2013, 26 June	Shanshan, Xinjiang	35	On 26 June 2013, 35 people died in the riots, including 22 civilians, two police officers and eleven attackers.
2013 Tiananmen Square attack	2013, 28 October	Beijing	5	A car crashed in Tiananmen Square, Beijing, China, as a terrorist suicide attack. Five people died in the incident; 3 inside the vehicle and 2 civilian nearby.
2014 Kunming attack	2014, 1 March	Kunming	35	Eight Uyghur terrorists stabbed 31 civilians to death and left 141 injured. On the afternoon of 3 March, the official announced the resolution of the case. A total of 8 people were killed. Of the 5 directly involved in the attack, 4 were killed on the spot and 1 was captured on the spot.
May 2014 Ürümqi attack	2014, 22 March	Ürümqi, Xinjiang	43	Two sport utility vehicles (SUVs) carrying five assailants were driven into a busy street market in Ürümqi, the capital of China's Xinjiang Uyghur Autonomous Region. Up to a dozen explosives were thrown at shoppers from the windows of the SUVs. The SUVs crashed into shoppers then collided with each other and exploded. Forty-three people were killed, including 4 of the assailants, and more than 90 wounded. The event was designated as a terrorist attack.
Yarkand Massacre	2014, 28 July	Yarkant County, Kashgar Prefecture, Xinjiang	96	Government sources state the death toll at 96, but other estimates range into the thousands.
2015 Aksu colliery attack	2015, 18 September	Aksu Prefecture, Xinjiang	16	A group of armed separatists attacked coal miners and security personnel, murdering 16 people and injuring 18 others. When the local police arrived at the scene, the attacker used a truck full of coal to hit the police vehicle and then fled into the mountains. The majority of the victims of this attack were Han people.
Yema stabbings	2016, September 29	Yema, Qujing, Yunnan Province	19	Yang Qingpei killed his parents in an argument over money and then murdered 17 neighbours in an attempt to cover up his crime.
2023 Guangzhou car attack	2023, January 11	Guangzhou, Guangdong	6 killed, 29 Injured	Mass intentional injury incident when the driver of a black BMW X3 deliberately rammed his vehicle into a crowd of pedestrians and motorists on Tianhe Road
Ju County attack	2024, February 10	Juxian County, Rizhao, Shandong	21+ killed, many wounded	21+ people, including a doctor who arrived at the scene to provide medical assistance, were killed in a village massacre in Juxian County, Shandong.
2024 Zhuhai car attack	2024, November 11	Zhuhai, Guangdong,	35 killed	44 injured, including the perpetrator.
2025 Jinhua car attack	2025, April 22	Jinhua, Zhejiang	7-14 killed	Vehicle ramming at an elementary school.
2026 Beijing ramming attack	2026, March 29	Beijing	8+ killed	Attack on a market using a frontend loader.

== See also ==
- List of rebellions in China
- List of Chinese wars and battles
- Mass killings under communist regimes
- List of rampage killers in China
