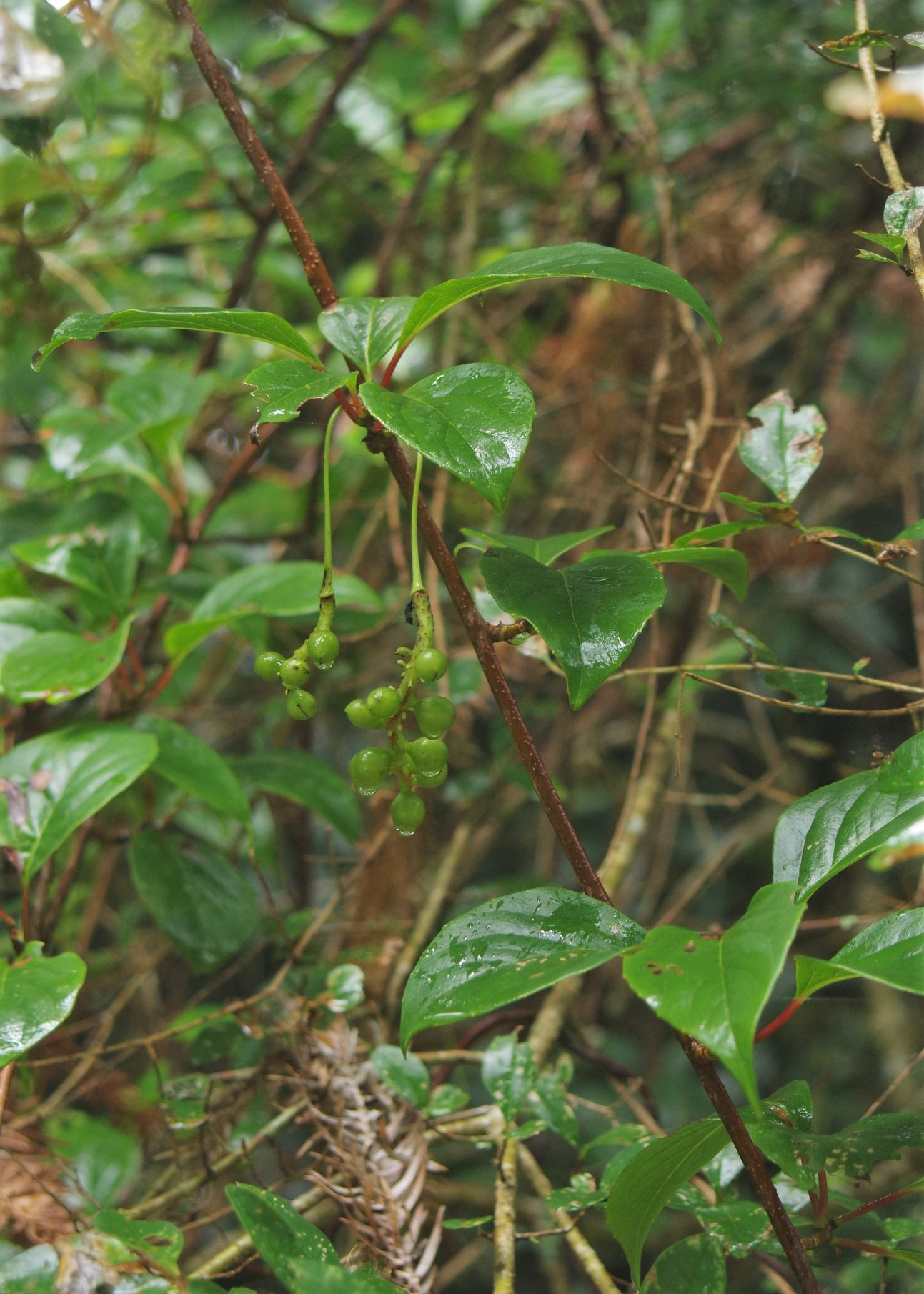

Scientific classification
- Kingdom: Plantae
- Clade: Tracheophytes
- Clade: Angiosperms
- Order: Austrobaileyales
- Family: Schisandraceae
- Genus: Schisandra
- Species: S. arisanensis

Binomial name
- Schisandra arisanensis Hayata

Subspecies
- Schisandra arisanensis arisanensis; Schisandra arisanensis viridis

= Schisandra arisanensis =

Species of plant

Schisandra arisanensis is a climber plant species that is native to China and Taiwan. It grows primarily in the temperate biome. The plant is known for its medicinal properties and its fruit is also edible.

== Features ==
The plants are glabrous throughout, with young branches lacking wings. The leaf-bearing branches are elongated. The petiole is 1–3.4 cm long, and the leaf blade is elliptic to ovate, 5–10.5(-12.5) × 2.5–7 cm in size. The blade is papery to subleathery and not glaucous, with pale venation after drying. The secondary veins are 4–6 on each side of the midvein, and the base is cuneate to broadly cuneate and often ± decurrent on the petiole. The margin is denticulate to serrulate, and the apex is acuminate to long acuminate.

The flowers of Schisandra arisanensis are axillary to fugacious bracts at the base of young shoots or axillary to leaves, and solitary. The peduncle is 1.8-4.5 cm (staminate) and 3.5–4 cm (pistillate). The tepals are 5-8(-13), and the largest are 4-12 × 3.5-8.5 mm in size. They come in shades of pale yellow, yellow, orange, reddish orange, or red.

The fruit of Schisandra arisanensis has a peduncle that is 4–8 cm long and a torus that is 3.5-15.5 cm in size.

The plant flowers from April to June and fruits from June to September.

Schisandra arisanensis is found in forests and shrublands in Anhui, Fujian, Guangdong, Guangxi, Guizhou, Hunan, Jiangxi, and Zhejiang of china as well as Taiwan, at elevations ranging from 200 to 2300 m.

== Uses ==
Schisandra arisanensis is used in Traditional Chinese medicine. Its fruit is also edible and is commonly used in Chinese cuisine.
