= 1st Independent Division of Sichuan Provincial Military District =

Independent Division of Chengdu Military Region (1966–69) 1st Independent Division of Chengdu Military Region (1969–70) 1st Independent Division of Sichuan Provincial Military District (1970-76)
- Active: 1966.8 - 1976.5
- Country: People's Republic of China
- Branch: People's Liberation Army
- Type: Division
- Role: Infantry

Commanders
- Notable commanders: Du Ling

Independent Division of Chengdu Military Region (Chinese: 成都军区独立师) was formed in August 1964 from Public Security Contingent of Sichuan province. The division was composed of four regiments (1st to 4th). (From May 1st 1955 to October 1969 Chengdu Military Region also acted as Sichuan Military Region.)

On January 22, 1968, the divisional commander, Du Ling (Chinese: 杜灵), was shot to death when he was travelling in his car in Chengdu, when he was trying to pass the barricade guarded by armed "rebels" (Chinese: 造反派), and his deputy commander Li Wen(Chinese: 李文) badly injured.

In September 1969 the division was renamed as 1st Independent Division of Chengdu Military Region (Chinese: 成都军区独立第1师).

In February 1970 the division was renamed as 1st Independent Division of Sichuan Provincial Military District (Chinese: 四川省军区独立第1师).

The division was disbanded in May 1976.
