= Secret Archives about the Cultural Revolution in Guangxi =

Collection of Chinese Cultural Revolution documents

Secret Archives about the Cultural Revolution in Guangxi, Classified Documents
- Editor: Song Yongyi, et al
- Author: Guangxi Zhuang Autonomous Regional Committee of the Chinese Communist Party
- Language: Chinese
- Series: 36 (2016), 10 (2017)
- Subject: Cultural Revolution
- Published: 2016 and 2017 (Guoshi Press, United States)
- ISBN: 9781630327217

Secret Archives about the Cultural Revolution in Guangxi, Classified Documents (simplified Chinese: 广西文革机密档案资料; traditional Chinese: 廣西文革機密檔案資料) are official documents containing historical details about the Chinese Cultural Revolution (1966–1976) in Guangxi. The archives were originally composed by the Guangxi Zhuang Autonomous Regional Committee of the Chinese Communist Party in the 1980s, and were later published in the United States in 2016 and 2017 after being compiled by Chinese historian Song Yongyi and others. The main archives published in 2016 contain 36 volumes, and the supplements published in 2017 contain 10 volumes, giving a total of approximately 9 million word count in Chinese.

== Composition ==
During the Boluan Fanzheng period after the Cultural Revolution (1966–1976), Beijing received a large number of visitors from Guangxi who arrived to report large-scale massacres and massive cannibalism, claims that were initially denied by the Guangxi Zhuang Autonomous Regional Committee of the Chinese Communist Party.

Beginning 1981, at least three investigation teams were sent to Guangxi by Chinese Communist Party (CCP) leaders in Beijing, including Hu Yaobang (then Chairman and General Secretary of the CCP) and Xi Zhongxun. The investigation teams were led by Li Rui, Zhou Yifeng (周一峰) and other senior officials from the CCP central leadership. In a span of approximately five years, the Guangxi CCP Regional Committee was re-organized and over 100,000 local officials were tasked with investigating and resolving the remaining issues from the Cultural Revolution.

Between 1986 and 1988, the Guangxi CCP Regional Committee composed the Archives about the Cultural Revolution in Guangxi (广西"文革"档案资料), after collecting and compiling reports from cities and counties in Guangxi, making the Archives the most comprehensive historical documents about the Cultural Revolution in Guangxi. The Archives were divided into 18 volumes, each of which has 600-800 pages in length. In particular, the Archives contain details of the Guangxi Massacre and the massive cannibalism during the Cultural Revolution.

== Publication ==
A number of CCP officials (and their families), including those who were part of the official investigation teams in the 1980s, had brought copies of the Archives out of mainland China and these copies were then kept in libraries around the world, including the Library of Congress, Harvard University Library, Stanford University Libraries and so on.

A research team led by Chinese historian Song Yongyi subsequently started to organize and compile the copies, eventually publishing them with Guoshi Press in the United States, as the Secret Archives about the Cultural Revolution in Guangxi, Classified Documents in 2016 followed by the Supplement in 2017. It took six years of effort by Song to secure each volume from a network of archivists, collectors and high-ranking Chinese officials who smuggled out documents. The main Secret Archives contain 36 volumes, with over 7 million word count in Chinese, and the Supplement contain 10 volumes.

== See also ==
- Guangxi Massacre
- Wei Guoqing
- Scarlet Memorial: Tales of Cannibalism in Modern China
- Boluan Fanzheng
