= Song Yongyi =

Chinese-American historian

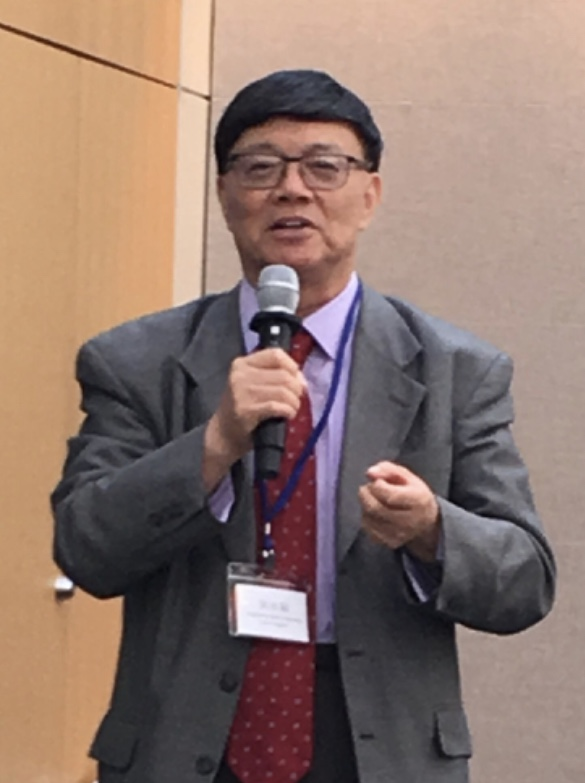
- Song Yongyi Speaking at a Conference
- Born: Song Yongyi; December 15, 1949 (age 76) Cixi, Zhejiang, China
- Occupation: Author, political activist, lecturer
- Education: Shanghai Normal University; University of Colorado Boulder; Indiana University

Song Yongyi (Chinese: 宋永毅; born 15 December 1949) is a Chinese American historian who specializes in the study of Chinese Cultural Revolution. He currently works at the California State University, Los Angeles, and previously served as a college librarian at the Dickinson College in Pennsylvania.

== Biography ==
Song Yongyi was born in Shanghai, China in December 1949. During the Cultural Revolution, Song became a Red Guard who followed Mao Zedong, but was jailed when he was 17 for several years because he was part of the "counter-revolutionary clique" that challenged Zhang Chunqiao.

After the Cultural Revolution, he was accepted into the Shanghai Normal University in 1977, when the National College Entrance Examination was resumed by Deng Xiaoping. He came to the United States in 1989 and obtained a Master of Arts from the University of Colorado Boulder in 1992, and was awarded another master's degree at the Indiana University Bloomington in 1995.

In the summer of 1999, Song went back to China to collect documents related to the Cultural Revolution, but was arrested by the Chinese government for "stealing state secrets". More than 100 scholars and researchers called for his release. United States senator Arlen Specter and U.S. Representative Matt Salmon intervened in the case and negotiated with Jiang Zemin, then General Secretary of the Chinese Communist Party and Chinese President. Song was finally released from prison after more than 100 days.

== Awards ==
- "The Eighth Cultural Award," The Chan's Journalism and Culture Foundation in New York on July 7, 2000.
- "Award for Scholarship and Promoting Intellectual Freedom," The Pennsylvania Library Association, September 26, 2000.
- "The 21st Century Librarian National Award," School of Information Studies, Syracuse University, October 10, 2004.
- "Paul Howard Award for Courage," American Library Association, Chicago, June 28, 2005.
- "Champion of Freedom of Speech Award," Visual Artists Guild, Los Angeles, May 27, 2006.
- "Zoia Horn Intellectual Freedom Award," California Library Association, November 11, 2011.
- "CALA Distinguished Service Award," Chinese-American Librarian Association, June 16，2013.

== Selected publications ==
- Yongyi Song; Dajin Sun; Eugene Wu (1998). The Cultural Revolution: a bibliography, 1966-1996. Harvard-Yenching Library, Harvard University. ISBN 978-0-941128-06-3.
- Song Yongyi; Zhou Zehao. Heterodox Thoughts During the Cultural Revolution, Parts I and II, Contemporary Chinese Thought 32, no. 4 (Summer 2001); 33, no. 1 (Fall 2001)
- Song Yongyi (2002). Massacres during the Cultural Revolution. Open Books. ISBN 9627934097
- Jian Guo; Yongyi Song; Yuan Zhou (2006). Historical Dictionary of the Chinese Cultural Revolution. Scarecrow Press. ISBN 978-0-8108-5461-1.
- Song Yongyi (2011). CHRONOLOGY OF MASS KILLINGS DURING THE CHINESE CULTURAL REVOLUTION (1966-1976). Sciences Po.
- Guo Jian, Yongyi Song, Yuan Zhou (2015). Historical Dictionary of the Chinese Cultural Revolution (Historical Dictionaries of War, Revolution, and Civil Unrest). Rowman & Littlefield Publishers.
- Song Yongyi, et al, ed. (2017). Secret Archives about the Cultural Revolution in Guangxi, Classified Documents. Guoshi Press, ISBN 9781630327217.
- Song, Y. (2021). Mao Zedong he Wenhua Dageming: Zhengzhi xinli yu wenhua jiyin de xinchanshi [Mao Zedong and the Cultural Revolution: A new interpretation from perspectives of political psychology and cultural gene]. Taibei: Lianjing chubanshe.
