= Siling, Guangxi =

Siling 思灵镇
- Town
- Location in Guangxi
- Coordinates: 23°26′29″N 109°30′13″E
- Country: People's Republic of China
- Autonomous region: Guangxi
- Prefecture-level city: Laibin
- County: Wuxuan County
- Time zone: UTC+8 (China Standard)

Siling (Chinese: 思灵; pinyin: Sīlíng) is a town under the administration of Wuxuan County, Guangxi, China. As of 2023, it administers the following nine villages:

- Lingchi Village (灵池村)
- Shanwen Village (山汶村)
- Guzhang Village (古樟村)
- Mashan Village (马山村)
- Silao Village (思劳村)
- Gantang Village (甘棠村)
- Taiping Village (太平村)
- Chaodong Village (朝东村)
- Shuanglin Village (双林村)
