= Huang Yongsheng =

Chinese general (1910–1983)

- 黄永胜
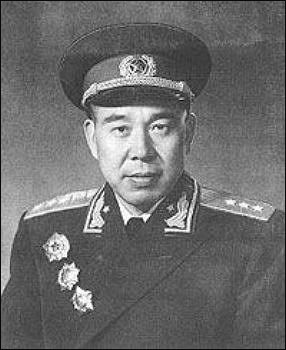
- Huang Yongsheng in 1955
- Born: November 17, 1910; Xianning, Hubei, Qing China
- Died: April 26, 1983 (aged 72); Qingdao, Shandong, People's Republic of China
- Military career
- Allegiance: China
- Branch: People's Liberation Army
- Service years: 1927–1971
- Rank: General (1955)
- Units: First Corps, Chinese Red Army
- Commands: 31st Division of the 11th Red Army, 16th Division of the 22nd Red Army,
- Conflicts: Autumn Harvest Uprising, Long March, Second Sino-Japanese War, Campaign to Defend Siping, Campaign to Suppress Bandits in Northeast China, Linjiang Campaign, Siping Campaign, Summer Offensive of 1947 in Northeast China, Autumn Offensive of 1947 in Northeast China, Winter Offensive of 1947 in Northeast China, Gongzhutun Campaign, Siege of Changchun, Liaoshen Campaign, Pingjin Campaign, Korean War
- Awards: Order of Red Star, Third Class; Order of Bayi, First Class; Order of Independence and Freedom, First class; Order of Liberation, First class

Huang Yongsheng (simplified Chinese: 黄永胜; traditional Chinese: 黃永勝; pinyin: Huáng Yǒngshèng; 1910–1983) was a general of the China's People's Liberation Army. In 1955 Huang was awarded the position of Shang Jiang (colonel-general), and Huang continued to rise throughout the 1950s and 1960s, eventually becoming Lin Biao's Chief-of-staff during the Cultural Revolution. Because of Huang's close associations with Lin Biao, Huang was purged following Lin's death in 1971.

== Biography ==
=== Early years ===
Huang Yongsheng was born in Xianning prefecture (now, prefecture-level city) of Hubei province.

Huang Yongsheng participated in the Autumn Harvest Uprising of 1927, and in December of the same year joined the Chinese Communist Party. In 1932, he was appointed the commander of the 31st Division of the 11th Red Army, and later to the 16th Division of the 22nd Red Army. During the war against Japan, he was appointed a regimental commander in the 115th Division of the Eighth Route Army.

In 1948, Huang was appointed the commander of the 6th Column of the Fourth Field Army. Later in 1948 the 6th Column merged with other units into the 43rd Army, and Huang Yongsheng was appointed its commander. In 1949, he was commanding the 14th and 13th Army Groups.

=== People's Republic of China ===
After the establishment of the People's Republic of China, Huang commanded the 13th Army Group, and later the 15th Army Group.

During the Korean War, Huang commanded the 13th Army Group, and later the 15th Army Group.

==== Cultural Revolution ====
During the Cultural Revolution, Huang Yongsheng commanded the Guangzhou Military Region, and was responsible for the Guangxi Massacre and the Guangdong Massacre. It was reported much later that during the pro-communist riots in Hong Kong in 1967, he suggested invading and occupying the British colony; his plan, however, was vetoed by Zhou Enlai. As a Chief of Staff of the PLA, in 1969, he was put in charge of building the tunnel system to house the PLA command headquarters in case of nuclear war, known as Underground Project 131. The chosen site for the facility was in his home prefecture of Xianning.

During the Cultural Revolution, Huang became an ally of China's defense minister and vice-chairman, Lin Biao, eventually serving as Lin's chief-of-staff. In the summer of 1971, immediately preceding Lin's death, Huang issued a strongly-worded statement condemning Zhou Enlai's plan to seek a closer relationship with the United States. Huang attempted to rationalize his position by stating that the United States was a declining capitalist power, and would be especially dangerous in this condition.

Huang lost his position following Lin Biao's death. He was arrested on September 24, 1971 - two weeks after Lin Biao's alleged plot to assassinate Mao. After the arrest, even his family did not know what was happening to him, until he was put on trial in 1980 and given a prison sentence.

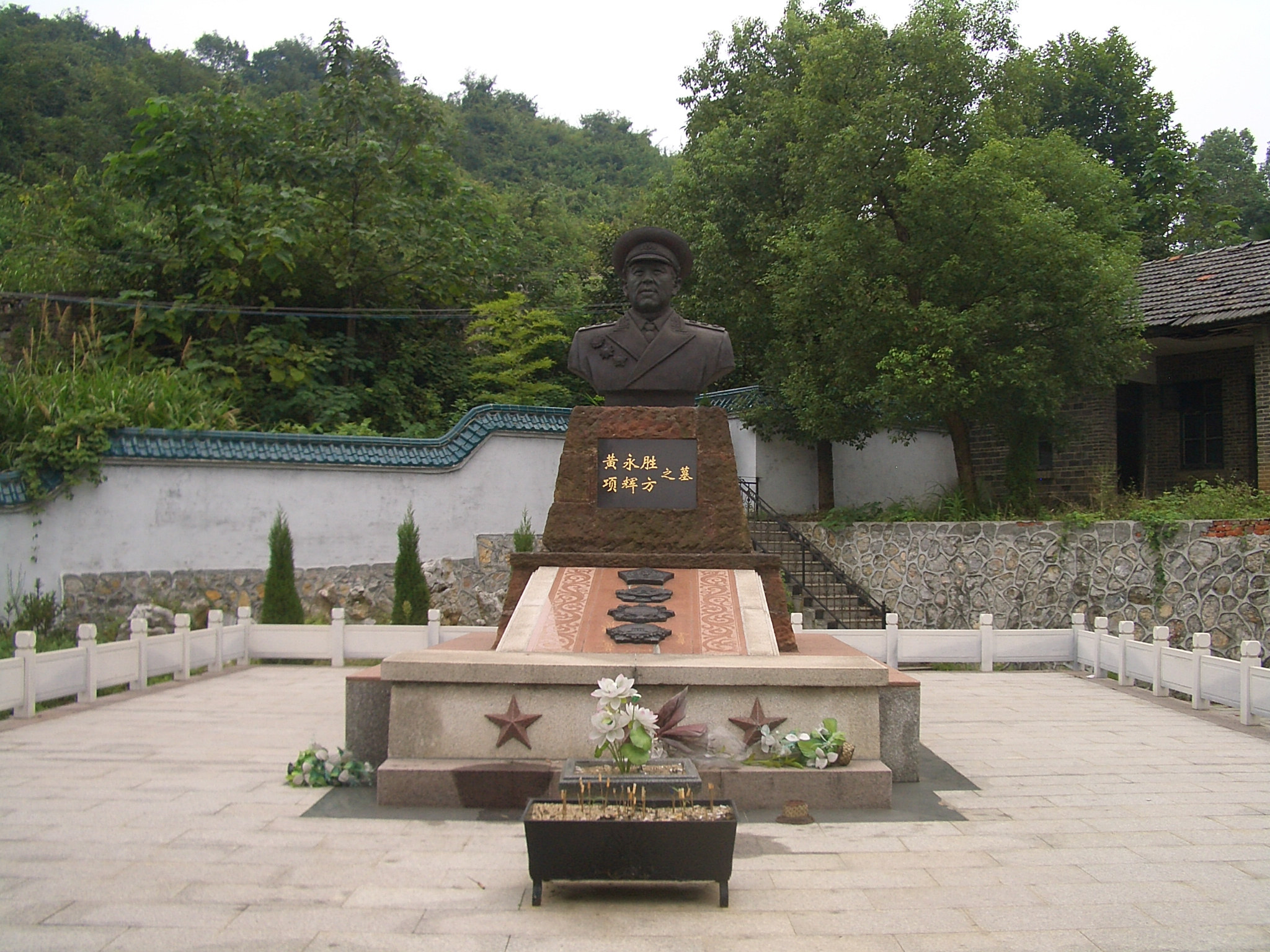
Huang Yongsheng's grave, at the Underground Project 131 site

Huang's involvement in the plot to assassinate Mao Zedong was implied (though not directly stated) by the confession of Li Weixin (the only one of Lin's plotters to have survived 1971). At his trial in 1980, the government of China agreed that Huang did not know anything about Lin Liguo's plans to assassinate Mao, or of Lin's flight from China.

=== Death ===
In 1983, Huang died in Qingdao, China. Huang's grave is located on the Project 131 site, which is now a museum.

== See also ==
- Guangxi Massacre
- Guangdong Cultural Revolution Massacre

Military offices
Preceded by Yang Chengwu	Head of PLA General Staff Headquarters; 1968–1971	Succeeded by Deng Xiaoping
