= Yangjiang Massacre =

- Part of the Cultural Revolution in China
- The current map of Yangjiang, which was a county during the massacre but was later promoted to be a city in China, governing various counties.
- Native name: 阳江大屠杀
- Location: Yangjiang, Guangdong Province China
- Date: 1968; September 1968 – January 1969
- Target: "Rightists", "opportunists", "separatists", members of the "Five Black Categories" (Landlords, wealthy peasants, bad influences/elements and rightists)
- Attack type: Politicide, Mass killing, Massacre
- Deaths: 3,573
- Perpetrators: Chinese Communist Party, local Revolutionary Committees
- Motive: Cultural Revolution instigated by Mao Zedong

The Yangjiang Massacre (simplified Chinese: 阳江大屠杀; traditional Chinese: 陽江大屠殺) was a series of massacres that took place in Yangjiang, Guangdong during the Chinese Cultural Revolution. According to the Chinese Communist Party (CCP) committee in Yangjiang, a total of at least 3,573 people died in the Yangjiang Massacre. Specifically, the massacre in Yangjiang County took place from January 1, 1968, to mid-January 1969, killing 909 people, while the massacre in Yangchun County began on September 23, 1967, killing 2,664 people in total. During the massacre, methods of torture and slaughter included beating with hoes or clubs, gun shooting, drowning, stabbing, stoning, exploding with fireworks, burning with kerosene, live burial, and so on.

From May 11 to 15, 1968, the directors of revolutionary committees in the areas of Zhanjiang, Guangdong were called to a meeting in Haikang, in which they were asked to initiate a campaign against "rightists", "opportunists", "separatists" and so on. As a result, the massacre in Yangjiang area escalated significantly. The killings were organized and managed by local military committees, and were conducted by various people's communes as well as production brigades in the region, targeting members of the Five Black Categories and their relatives (including infants). At the time, many dead bodies could be seen floating on the Moyang River (漠阳江). Starting from the summer of 1968, the situation had grown out of control, forcing the Central Committee of CPC and the local military committees to take multiple interventions using the People's Liberation Army, but the massacre did not completely stop until mid-January 1969.

== See also ==
- Mass killings under communist regimes
- List of massacres in China
