= Jinzhong College =

College in Shanxi, China

Jinzhong University
- 晋中学院
- Type: Public
- Established: 1958; May 2004
- Affiliations: Department of Education of Shanxi Province
- Location: Shanxi, People's Republic of China; 37°44′34″N 112°42′46″E
- Campus: Urban,
- Website: www.tynu.edu.cn
- Location within Shanxi Location within China

Jinzhong University (Chinese: 晋中学院) is a college in Shanxi, China under the authority of the provincial government. It is on Wenyuan Road in Yuci district. It has several campuses. The predecessor of Jinzhong College was a junior college level normal school established in 1958 during The Great Leap Forward. Jinzhong College was approved by the Ministry of Education in May 2004.

The school occupies an area of 824,700 square meters, with a construction area of 516,600 square meters. The library has more than 1.2 million books, 1,322 types of paper journals and 375,000 types of electronic books. Jinzhong College has carried out more than 200 national and provincial research projects. It has published nearly 500 monographs and textbooks at presses above the provincial level and has received over 80 awards above the provincial level.
