= Old Well (film) =

- DVD cover

Chinese name
- Traditional Chinese: 老井
- Simplified Chinese: 老井
- Literal meaning: old well
Transcriptions
Standard Mandarin
- Hanyu Pinyin: lǎo jǐng
Yue: Cantonese
- Jyutping: lou5 zeng2
- Directed by: Wu Tianming
- Written by: Zheng Yi
- Starring: Zhang Yimou; Liang Yujin; Niu Xingli; Lü Liping
- Cinematography: Zhang Yimou; Chen Wangcai
- Edited by: Chen Dali
- Music by: Xu Youfu
- Production company: Xi'an Film Studio
- Release date: 1987
- Running time: 130 minutes
- Country: China
- Language: Mandarin

Old Well (Chinese: 老井) is a 1987 Chinese drama film written by Zheng Yi about a village worker's effort of digging a well in his water-starved hometown located in northwest China and his affairs with his old girlfriend. It is produced by Xi'an Film Studio and directed by Wu Tianming, starring Zhang Yimou and Liang Yujin.

The film won the 8th Golden Rooster awards for Best Picture, Director, Leading Male Actor, and Supporting Female Actor in 1988. The film also won the Best Feature Film and Leading Male Actor awards at the 1987 Tokyo International Film Festival.

The film is based on the novel of the same name, also written by Zheng Yi, first published in China. It was translated by David Kwan to English and published in 1990 by China Books & Periodicals in the United States.
