= 1993 Chongqing shooting =

1993 mass shooting in Chongqing, China

Chongqing shooting
- Location: 29.610°N 106.389°E; Chongqing, China
- Date: 5 April 1993
- Attack type: Mass murder, mass shooting, murder-suicide, spree shooting
- Weapon: Hunting rifle
- Deaths: 9 (including the perpetrator)
- Injuries: 3
- Perpetrator: Chen Xuerong

The Chongqing shooting was a mass shooting that occurred in Chongqing, China, on 5 April 1993. Chen Xuerong (surname written in Chinese: 程), a worker at the Chongqing machine factory, who was angered by a mistake on his timesheet, armed himself with a hunting rifle and searched for his boss with the intent to kill him, but upon finding that they were not present, he shot dead three of his co-workers.

Pursued by security guards, Chen escaped the factory grounds by jumping over a wall, and once out on the street fired at a family of four passing by on a motorcycle with sidecar, fatally hitting a man and two women, and wounding the fourth. He next injured a soldier in a van, and then killed another man, using his bike to flee. At a junction Chen stopped and hijacked a taxi, killing the driver, and injuring his passenger, and eventually killed himself by driving down a 30-meter deep ravine, about 40 minutes after firing his first shots.
