= Mingjing News =

New York-based Chinese-language news website

- Native name: 明鏡新聞
- Website type: News
- Available in: Chinese
- Owner: Mirror Media Group
- Editor: Ho Pin
- Website: news.mingjingnews.com
- Commercial: Yes

Mingjing News (Chinese: 明鏡新聞) is a New York-based Chinese-language news website owned by Mirror Media Group. Its editor-in-chief is Ho Pin.

Stories broken by Mingjing News include predicting appointments to the Chinese Communist Party's Politburo Standing Committee in 2012, and reporting the revelations surrounding Zhou Yongkang in 2014.

The site was the subject of a denial-of-service attack by the Great Cannon of China in 2017.
