= Wuxuan County =

Wuxuan County 武宣县 · Vujsenh Yen
- County
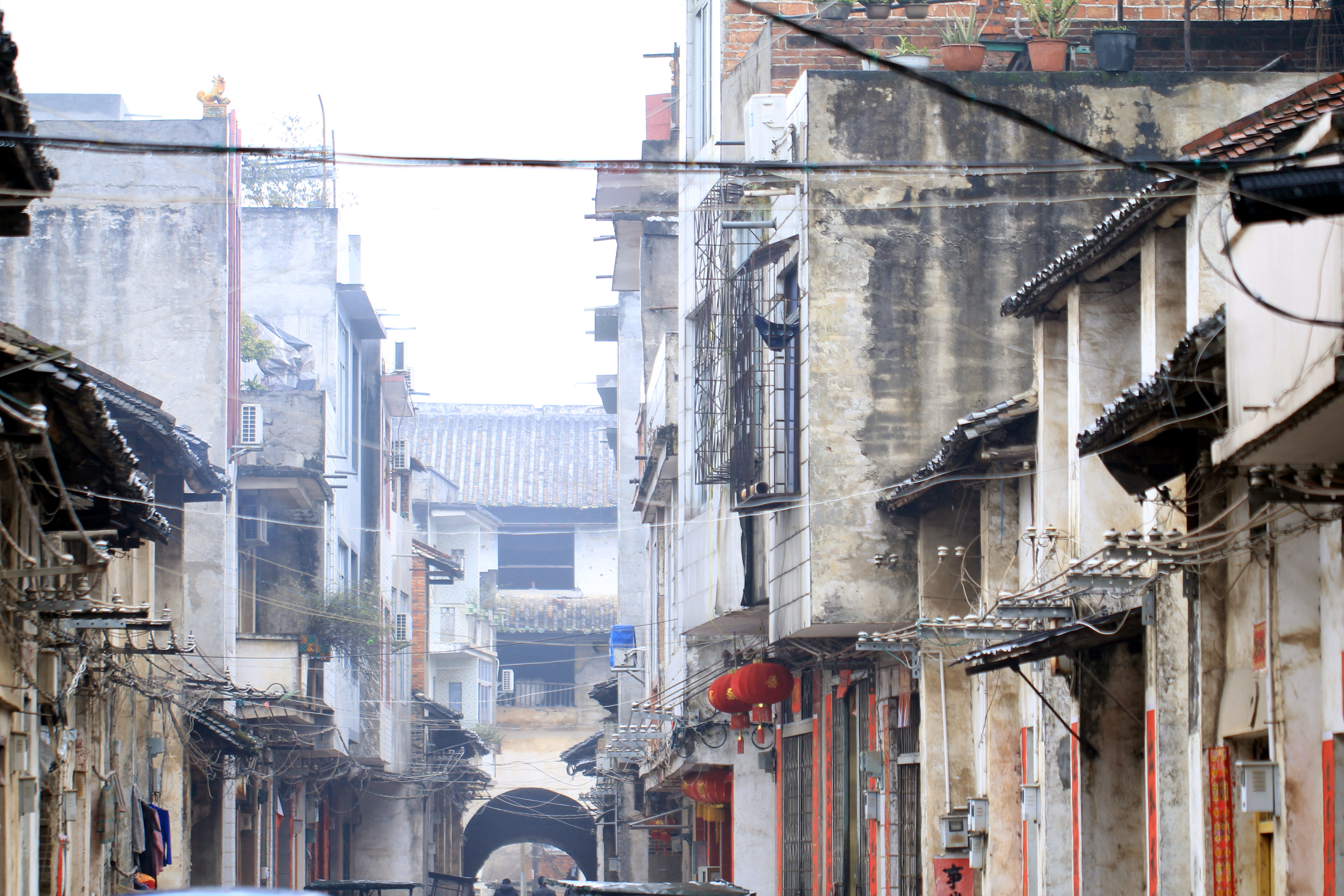
- Wuxuan Old Street

- Location of the seat in Guangxi
- Coordinates: 23°35′38″N 109°39′47″E
- Country: China
- Province: Guangxi
- Prefecture-level city: Laibin
- County seat: Wuxuan Town

Area
  - Total: 1,739 km^{2} (671 sq mi)

Population (2020)
  - Total: 340,312
  - Density: 195.7/km^{2} (506.8/sq mi)
- Time zone: UTC+8 (China Standard)

Wuxuan County (Chinese: 武宣县; pinyin: Wǔxuān Xiàn; Zhuang: Vujsenh Yen) is a county in the east-central part of Guangxi, China. It is under the administration of the prefecture-level city of Laibin.

During the Cultural Revolution, the county was the site of pitched battles between rival factions. The investigative journalist Zheng Yi wrote of these battles and cases of cannibalism of members of the fallen faction in his book Scarlet Memorial: Tales Of Cannibalism In Modern China.

== Administrative divisions ==
Wuxuan County is divided into 9 towns and 1 township:

towns

- Wuxuan 武宣镇
- Tongling 桐岭镇
- Tongwan 通挽镇
- Dongxiang 东乡镇
- Sanli 三里镇
- Ertang 二塘镇
- Huangmao 黄茆镇
- Luxin 禄新镇
- Siling 思灵镇

township

- Jinji 金鸡乡

== Population ==
According to the data from the Seventh National Population Census, as of 00:00 on November 1, 2020, the permanent resident population of Wuxuan County was 340,312.

== Climate ==
Climate data for Wuxuan, elevation 70 m (230 ft), (1991–2020 normals, extremes 1981–2010)
Month	Jan	Feb	Mar	Apr	May	Jun	Jul	Aug	Sep	Oct	Nov	Dec	Year
Record high °C (°F)	28.8 (83.8)	32.7 (90.9)	34.0 (93.2)	35.7 (96.3)	35.7 (96.3)	37.7 (99.9)	39.4 (102.9)	38.7 (101.7)	39.0 (102.2)	36.6 (97.9)	32.8 (91.0)	30.4 (86.7)	39.4 (102.9)
Mean daily maximum °C (°F)	15.7 (60.3)	17.9 (64.2)	20.6 (69.1)	26.2 (79.2)	30.0 (86.0)	31.7 (89.1)	33.0 (91.4)	33.3 (91.9)	31.9 (89.4)	28.6 (83.5)	23.9 (75.0)	18.5 (65.3)	25.9 (78.7)
Daily mean °C (°F)	11.7 (53.1)	13.9 (57.0)	16.9 (62.4)	22.2 (72.0)	25.8 (78.4)	27.7 (81.9)	28.6 (83.5)	28.5 (83.3)	26.9 (80.4)	23.4 (74.1)	18.6 (65.5)	13.6 (56.5)	21.5 (70.7)
Mean daily minimum °C (°F)	8.9 (48.0)	11.1 (52.0)	14.2 (57.6)	19.2 (66.6)	22.6 (72.7)	24.8 (76.6)	25.5 (77.9)	25.2 (77.4)	23.4 (74.1)	19.6 (67.3)	14.9 (58.8)	10.1 (50.2)	18.3 (64.9)
Record low °C (°F)	0.0 (32.0)	0.4 (32.7)	1.3 (34.3)	7.3 (45.1)	11.9 (53.4)	17.5 (63.5)	19.1 (66.4)	20.6 (69.1)	15.0 (59.0)	8.5 (47.3)	3.5 (38.3)	−1.6 (29.1)	−1.6 (29.1)
Average precipitation mm (inches)	55.4 (2.18)	44.5 (1.75)	82.4 (3.24)	108.8 (4.28)	200.8 (7.91)	248.5 (9.78)	189.6 (7.46)	164.3 (6.47)	92.3 (3.63)	52.9 (2.08)	49.0 (1.93)	38.7 (1.52)	1,327.2 (52.23)
Average precipitation days (≥ 0.1 mm)	9.9	11.0	15.5	13.5	15.6	17.5	16.3	15.0	9.6	6.2	7.1	7.9	145.1
Average snowy days	0.2	0	0	0	0	0	0	0	0	0	0	0	0.2
Average relative humidity (%)	74	76	80	78	78	81	79	80	76	72	72	70	76
Mean monthly sunshine hours	67.4	57.9	49.7	87.1	138.1	149.9	200.5	194.3	179.3	173.5	134.6	112.1	1,544.4
Percentage possible sunshine	20	18	13	23	34	37	48	49	49	49	41	34	35
Source: China Meteorological Administration

== Bibliography ==
- Zheng, Yi (1996). Scarlet Memorial: Tales of Cannibalism in Modern China. edited and translated by T. P. Sym. With a Foreword by Ross Terrill. Boulder, CO: Westview Press. ISBN 081332615X.
