= Scarlet Memorial =

Book by Zheng Yi

Scarlet Memorial: Tales of Cannibalism in Modern China
- Author: Zheng Yi

Scarlet Memorial: Tales of Cannibalism in Modern China is a book of reportage literature by the Chinese novelist Zheng Yi. Zheng and a group of writers under the joint pseudonym "T. P. Sym" translated and abridged it from the Chinese work 红色纪念碑 Hongse jinianbei (Red monument; Taipei: Huashi, 1993). Zheng uses local government documents, eye-witness accounts and confessions to describe the factional violence and even cannibalism that occurred in the Guangxi Massacre during the Cultural Revolution (1966–1976).

Zheng blames the savagery and cannibalism on "class struggle" and "revolutionary revenge". The book received praise for revealing the nature of Mao's regime and also criticism for giving the impression that cannibalism was systematic and widespread.

== Development ==
=== Background ===
Zheng Yi was born in Chongqing, Sichuan, in 1947, and went to Beijing to attend the middle school attached to Qinghua University, China's leading technical university, which was a center of radical student activity when the Cultural Revolution broke out in 1966. Zhang became a leader in the Rebel Faction of the Red Guards and then in 1969 volunteered to go to the countryside, the Lüliang Mountains in Shanxi. He was a student at Yucai Teachers' Training College when he returned to Beijing in 1978. After graduation, he was editor of Yellow River (Huanghe) literary magazine and embarked on a career as a writer. His short story "Maple" ("Feng"), published in 1979, was among the first to deal frankly with the violence of the Red Guards. His novel Old Well (Laojing) was a realistic portrayal of peasant struggle, and was made into a film by Wu Tianming. Zheng was arrested for his participation in the Tiananmen demonstrations and the Chinese democracy movement of 1989. He escaped and hid for several years until he was able to get to Hong Kong in March 1993. He then went to the United States.

=== Fieldwork and research ===
Zheng Yi first visited Guangxi in 1968, when he was a Red Guard, and heard rumours of mass killings and cannibalism. He returned to do first-hand research in 1986, partly at the urging of his friend Liu Binyan, an investigative journalist. His initial talks with local officials and journalists led him to center his investigation on Wuxuan County, where the most intense factional fighting had taken place. Fighting had broken out in January 1968, but not until April, with the founding of the county Revolutionary Committee, did the victorious groups begin to take extreme revenge on their enemies. Zheng gathered testimony from witnesses and even from those who themselves had taken part in beatings, torture, and murder. He found ample proof of cannibalism. After a "beginning phase", in which organs were secretly taken from corpses, came a "heightening phase", in which it became gradually more acceptable to eat flesh, and then a "phase of massive madness", in which even those who had not been involved in the fighting took part. In July, after reports reached Premier Zhou Enlai, the People's Liberation Army was dispatched to end the violence.

Official investigations then determined that more than 500 people had been killed in the six months of fighting. Further investigations in the 1980s reported that some 76 cases of cannibalism had taken place, but Zheng's informants told him that there actually had been at least 100 cases. They also told him that livers were the prime targets, then hearts, and that all flesh had been taken from more than a dozen corpses. In some cases organs were taken before the victim had died. Investigations in the 1980s sentenced 34 offenders to prison for two to fourteen years, but others received only administrative sanctions. These investigations gave the reform and opening up–era government an opportunity to suppress or eliminate "ultraleftists", but the results of the investigation were not to be made public, for fear that the image of the Party would be hurt if news leaked to Hong Kong.

Zheng blamed the savagery and cannibalism on "class struggle" and "revolutionary revenge", since members of the losing side were accused of being landlords, "bad elements", "rightists" or supporters of opposing officials. These explanations could not cover all acts of violence, however. A male teacher, for instance, accused a female student of being a counter-revolutionary because he had heard that eating a young woman's heart could cure heart disease, and a group of students ate the flesh of a teacher, among other incidents.

=== Writing ===
Although his research in Guangxi was finished in 1986, Zheng did not begin writing until after the Tiananmen Square protests of 1989, in which he took part. He then went into hiding for two years, during which he wrote the book. The scholar Gang Yue suggests that the "time and circumstance" of its writing are "key to understanding the narrative as well as the thesis of the book" and that the tragic events of 1989 convinced Zheng to write the book.

== Release ==
=== Publication ===
The Chinese book was first published in Taiwan, translated into English, then French. The Chinese version is 686 pages, while the English version is reduced to only 199 by cutting similar or redundant passages. The reviewer Key Ray Chong said that the English version is "an entirely new book in the sense that less-substantive chapters or parts have been eliminated, to the extent that the original Chinese narratives are rendered more precise and their impact more powerful for non-Chinese readers".

=== Reception and analysis ===
Many China specialists reviewed the book favorably, though often noting that its descriptions were hard to bear. Arthur Waldron, for instance, called it "vivid and striking and bitterly ironic" and warns that Zheng "bids the reader accompany him, tolerating 'the smell of stinking corpses and the smell of blood, holding back the desire to vomit'". Jonathan Mirsky warned readers in The Times that it is "plainly written, utterly convincing, meticulously documented and terrible to read".

Some reviewers took Zheng to task for exaggeration and presenting cannibalism as systematic rather than isolated. Kathleen Schreiber summed up these criticisms as saying that there was "too much violence, too much speculation, and too many sources", which for some contributed to believability and critical impact. Zheng Yi uses eyewitness testimony, talks with the murderers and government documents, but also other non-fiction forms such as literary interpretation, political analysis and ethnographic description. Schreiber also objected to the excess of political commentary. Katherine E. Palmer wrote that while Zheng showed that incidents of cannibalism did take place, he resorts to "patronizing depictions of the Zhuang ethnic group" as explanations.

Roderick MacFarquhar and Michael Schoenhals also question Zheng's assumption that communism was the force that compelled the victors towards cannibalism, noting that similar incidents occurred under pressure from the Nationalist secret police in the Republican period.

Alice Cheang pointed out Zheng's possible political motives for writing the book. Although Scarlet Memorial in its shortened form "does not draw an explicit connection between its writing and the aftermath of the massacre of June 4, 1989, the contemporary reference is inescapable: in crying out against the unleashing of mass slaughter and cannibalism as a political weapon in the 1960s, Zheng Yi is also decrying the incumbent regime's failure, yet again, to take anything but a despotic and adversarial stance vis-a-vis its own people".

The literary critic Gang Yue devoted a section of The Mouth That Begs: Hunger, Cannibalism, and the Politics of Eating in Modern China to the book. Yue writes that incidents of cannibalism clearly took place, but Scarlet Memorial "can and must be read as a fictional text, despite the author's claim to historical accuracy and scientific truth" and goes on to question how "systematic" the cannibalism could have been, given the inherent factionalism of the Cultural Revolution. Yue sees Zheng as using the conventions of ethnography to establish credibility and refers to the text's transition from "investigative journalism" to "political polemic". Schreiber argues against Yue's assumption: polemic is in fact expressed through ethnography and investigative journalism, as both forms were suppressed under Mao's dictatorship and Zheng Yi's use of them cannot be divorced from his political claims.

Yue and Arthur Waldron are among the scholars to point out that cannibalism is a theme in both traditional and modern Chinese writing. Waldron said that for the Chinese, "eating people is the representative evil of their civilization". Both he and Gang Yue connect Zheng's use of cannibalism to Lu Xun's short story "Diary of a Madman" (1918), in which the writer of the diary becomes convinced that everyone around him is secretly consuming human flesh. Yue argues that Zheng uses many literary techniques that parallel Lu Xun's, and quotes Zheng as saying "Lu Xun's Madman suffered from schizophrenia, I was normal".

== See also ==
- Cannibalism in Asia
- Cultural Revolution
- Guangxi Massacre
- Secret Archives about the Cultural Revolution in Guangxi

== References and further reading ==
- Bramall, Chris (2008). "Reversing the Verdict on Maoism?". Journal of Communist Studies and Transition Politics. 24 (4): 657–667. doi:10.1080/13523270802510644. S2CID 153378169.
- Cheang, Alice W. (July 1, 1999). "Inscribing the Unspeakable". Taiwan Review.
- Becker, Jasper (1997). "(Book Review)". The China Quarterly. 150: 462–463. doi:10.1017/S0305741000052577. S2CID 155086964.
- Chong, Key Ray (1997). "(Review)". China Review International. 4 (2): 599–602. doi:10.1353/cri.1997.0150. JSTOR 23729145. S2CID 143919445.
- Gittings, John (1994). "The Truth Behind the Fiction". Index on Censorship. 23 (1–2): 204–205. doi:10.1080/03064229408535671. S2CID 147146639.
- Gong, Xiaoxia (1997). "(Book Review)". The China Journal. 37.
- Hooper, Beverly (1998). "'Real' Chinas in the 1990s". The China Journal. 39 (39): 83–91. doi:10.2307/2667695. JSTOR 2667695. S2CID 146993684.
- King, Richard (1997). "(Book Review)". Pacific Affairs. 70 (3): 435–436. doi:10.2307/2761044. JSTOR 2761044.
- Leung, Laifong (1994). "Zheng Yi: Well digging and root searching". In Leung, Laifong (ed.). Morning Sun: Interviews with Chinese Writers of the Lost Generation. Armonk, N.Y.: M.E. Sharpe. ISBN 978-1563240935.
- Lyell, William A (1999). "(Book Review)". Journal of Modern Literature in Chinese 現代中文文學學報. 3 (1): 7.
- Mirsky, Jonathan (10 April 1999). "A Political Hunger Sated". Times [London, England]: 36.
- Palmer, Katherine E (1997). "(Book Review)". China Information. 12 (1–2): 298–299. doi:10.1177/0920203X9701200138. S2CID 144448142.
- Schreiber, Holly E (2014). "Cannibalized Evidence: The Problem of over-Incorporation in Zheng Yi's Scarlet Memorial". The Comparatist. 38 (1): 70–82. doi:10.1353/com.2014.0019. S2CID 155010589.
- Sutton, Donald S. (January 1995). "Consuming Counterrevolution: The Ritual and Culture of Cannibalism in Wuxuan, Guangxi, China, May to July 1968". Comparative Studies in Society and History. 37 (1): 136–172. doi:10.1017/S0010417500019575. JSTOR 179381. S2CID 145660553.
- Unger, Jonathan (1998). "Cultural Revolution Conflict in the Villages". The China Quarterly. 153: 82–106. doi:10.1017/S030574100000299X. S2CID 154997463.
- Waldron, Arthur (July 1, 1997), "'Eat People' – A Chinese Reckoning", Commentary
- Yue, Gang (1999). The Mouth That Begs: Hunger, Cannibalism, and the Politics of Eating in Modern China. Duke University Press.
- 郑义 (Zheng Yi), 广西吃人狂潮真相 (Guangxi chiren kuangchao zhenxiang) 阿波罗新闻网 (Aboluo xinwen wang) 2007-01-29.
- —— (1993). 红色 纪念碑 Hongse Jinianbei. Taipei: 华视文化 Huashi wenhua. ISBN 978-9575720483.
- —— (1996). Scarlet Memorial: Tales of Cannibalism in Modern China. edited and translated by T. P. Sym. With a Foreword by Ross Terrill. Boulder, CO: Westview Press. ISBN 978-0813326153.
- —— (1999). Stèles rouges: du totalitarisme au cannibalisme. Paris: Bleu de Chine.
- Williams, Philip F. (1997). "Chinese Cannibalism's Literary Portrayal: From Cultural Myth to Literary Reportage". Tamkang Review: A Quarterly of Comparative Studies Between Chinese and Foreign Literature. XXVII (4): 421–442.
