= Andrew G. Walder =

American political sociologist

Andrew G. Walder (born 1953) is an American political sociologist specializing in the study of Chinese society. He has taught at Harvard University and Stanford University, where he joined the faculty in 1997 and is the Denise O'Leary & Kent Thiry Professor of the School of Humanities and Sciences, and a Senior Fellow of the Freeman-Spogli Institute for International Studies at Stanford University.

His research interests include Collective Action, Social Movements, Comparative and Historical Sociology, and Political Sociology. He has published extensively on the Chinese Cultural Revolution, Chinese industry and industrial reform, and Chinese society under Mao Zedong.

== Education and career ==
Walder was born in 1953. He received his PhD in sociology at the University of Michigan in 1981 and taught at Columbia University before moving to Harvard in 1987, where he headed the MA Program on Regional Studies-East Asia for several years. From 1995 to 1997, he headed the Division of Social Sciences at the Hong Kong University of Science and Technology. He joined that Stanford Department of Sociology in 1997. From 1996 to 2006, as a member of the Hong Kong Government's Research Grants Council, he chaired its Panel on the Humanities, Social Sciences, and Business Studies.

In 1985, he was awarded a Guggenheim Fellowship in the field of sociology.

== Reception and critique ==
Academic Dongping Han critiques Walder's claim that Mao's pronouncements during the Cultural Revolution were extremely ambiguous, particularly Walder's claim, "It takes an extraordinary amount of energy and imagination to figure out precisely what Mao really meant by such ideas as 'the restoration of capitalism' or 'newly arisen bourgeoise.'" Han writes even illiterate Chinese did not find the terms hard to grasp, noting that in his fieldwork interviews in Jimo county farmers readily understood "restoration of capitalism" to mean loss of the gains from land reform and a return to old social ways and that they understood "newly arisen bourgeoisie" to mean party leaders who did not work.

== Selected publications ==
- Andrew G. Walder, China Under Mao: A Revolution Derailed. Cambridge, Mass.: Harvard University Press, 2015.
- Walder, Andrew G. (2014). "Rebellion and Repression in China, 1966–1971". Social Science History. 38 (3 & 4). Cambridge University Press: 513–539. doi:10.1017/ssh.2015.23. S2CID 143087356.
- Fractured Rebellion: The Beijing Red Guard Movement. Cambridge, Mass.: Harvard University Press, 2009.
- Joseph W. Esherick, Paul G. Pickowicz, and Andrew G. Walder, eds., The Chinese Cultural Revolution as History. Stanford: Stanford University Press, 2006.
- Jean C. Oi and Andrew G. Walder, eds. Property Rights and Economic Reform in China. Stanford: Stanford University Press, 1999.
- Andrew G. Walder, ed. Zouping in Transition: The Process of Reform in Rural North China. Cambridge, Mass.: Harvard University Press, 1998.
- Andrew G. Walder, ed., China's Transitional Economy. Oxford: Oxford University Press, 1996.
- Andrew G. Walder, ed., The Waning of the Communist State: Economic Origins of Political Decline in China and Hungary. Berkeley: University of California Press, 1995.
- Andrew G. Walder, Communist Neo-Traditionalism: Work and Authority in Chinese Industry. Berkeley: University of California Press, 1986.
