= Conservative Faction (Cultural Revolution) =

Faction during the Cultural Revolution

During the Cultural Revolution, a Conservative Faction (Chinese: 保守派; pinyin: Bǎoshǒu pài), also called a Loyalist Faction (Chinese: 保皇派; lit. 'Protecting-the-emperor Faction'), referred to a group or a sociopolitical movement that embraced the local establishment. Composed of well-born children and political activists, the conservatives made up the majority of the Red Guards after Red August, but declined with the rise of the rebels.

== Origins ==
When Mao Zedong launched the Cultural Revolution in 1966, the initial thrust was to attack the so-called "bourgeois reactionary authorities" and "white experts", and students who opposed their teachers and focused more on politics formed the Red Guards. However, after Red August, Mao began to have students attack the "capitalist roaders of the Party", which led to a split in the Red Guards, with those who remained opposed to the "white experts" loosely being referred to as the Conservatives.

== Structures ==
=== Conservative students ===
A fairly significant portion of students joined the conservatives.

=== Pro-establishment forces ===
In order to confront the rebels, who were supported by Mao and the left wing of the party, the committees in various places mobilized workers, members of the Communist Youth League, who supported them.

== Development ==
The conservative-rebel conflict in Wuhan is one notable case during the Cultural Revolution.
