= Rebel Faction (Cultural Revolution) =

Chinese Red Guards faction

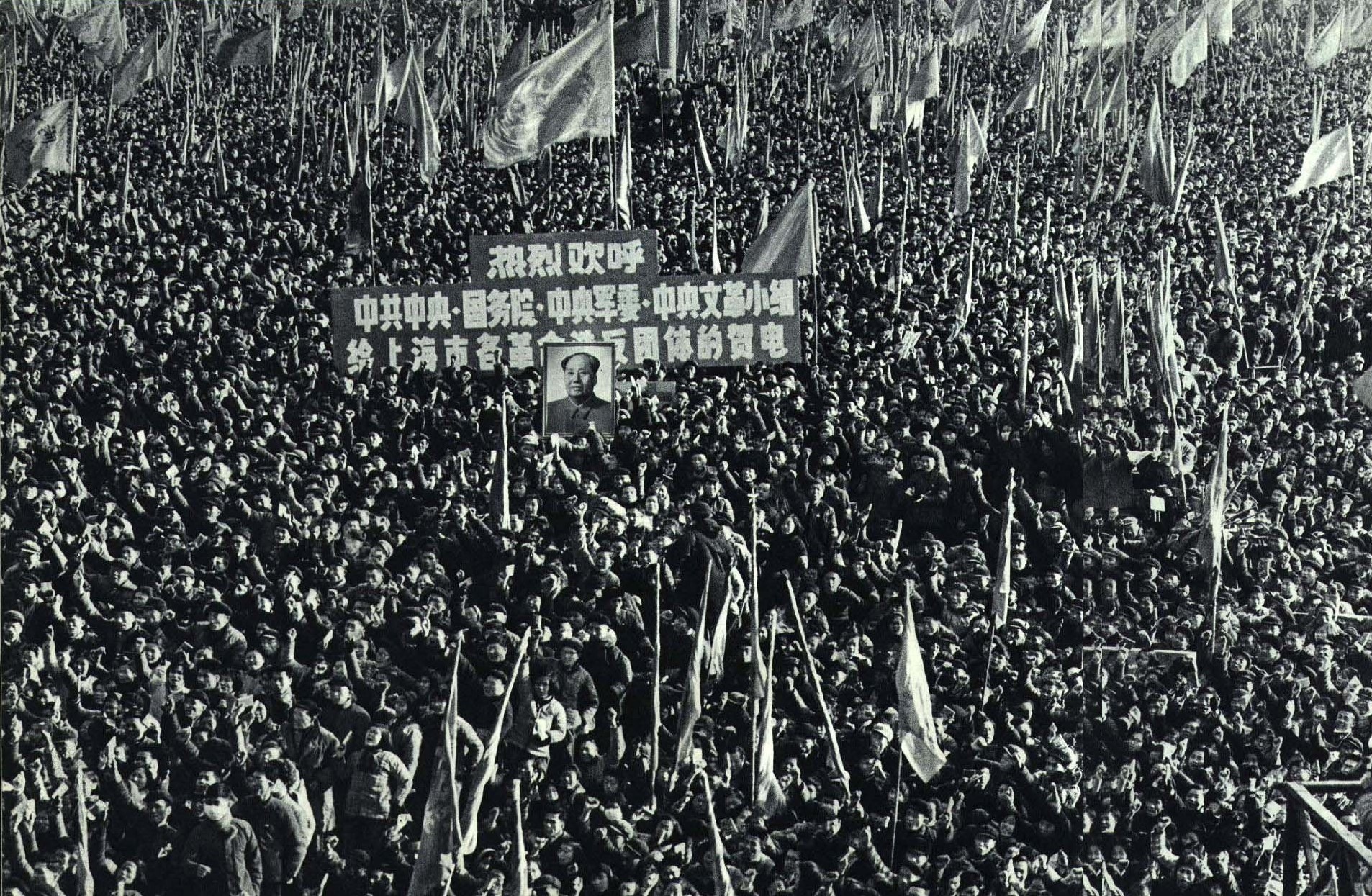
Rebel groups of Red Guards marching in Shanghai, 1967

During the Cultural Revolution, a Rebel Faction (Chinese: 造反派; pinyin: Zàofǎn pài) was a group or a sociopolitical movement that was self-proclaimed "rebellious". Composed of workers and students, they were often the more radical wing of the Red Guards and grew around 1967, but were accompanied by further splits and sectarianism.

== Origins ==
The rebel students largely continued the Red Guard movement of 1966, but it came more from the radical wing of the Red Guards within the universities. The rebel workers, on the other hand, were inspired by Mao Zedong's "to rebel is justified" and related phrases.

Yin Hongbiao points out that the rebels only gradually formed a formal faction after Red August on August 18, 1966.

== Structures ==
=== Rebel students ===
After the Red August in August 1966, radical students who had been criticized for their "bad blood" began to call themselves "rebels". The main targets of the rebels were those in power, the work teams and the Party organs. In principle, the rebels also criticized the "bourgeois reactionary academic authorities," but they were much less active than the conservative faction of Red Guards in this regard.

=== Rebel workers ===
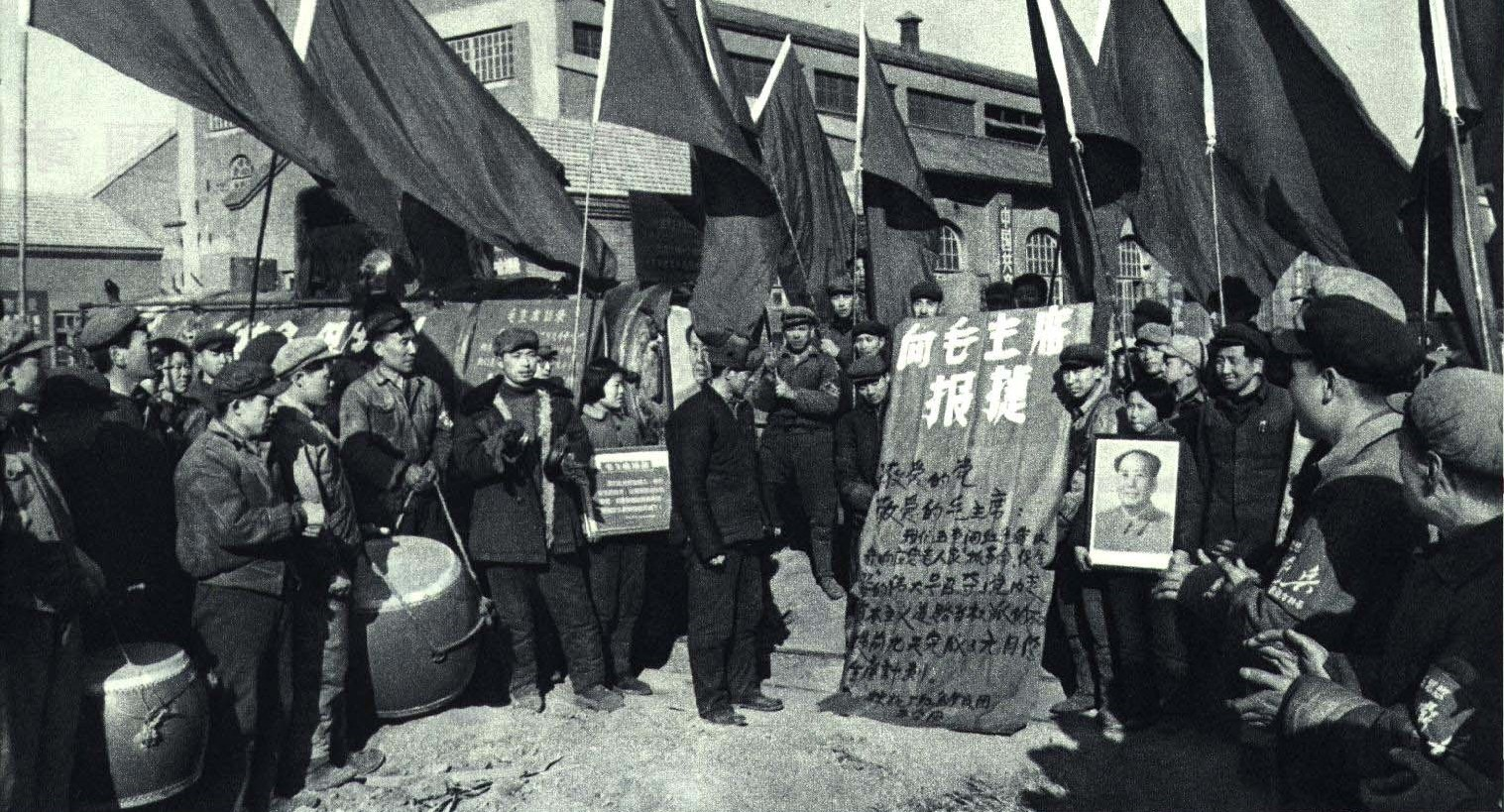
Rebel workers at Harbin Forestry Machinery Factory, 1967

As the Red Guard movement progressed, the working class also became involved in the movement. Compared to the students, the workers had much less propaganda tools, but Mao expressed clear support for the workers in 1968.

Harder to dismiss than the students, the workers were long hailed as the builders of China by officials, but they also blamed the bureaucracy for its shortcomings during this period.

== Development and factionalism ==
Factionalism had multiple causes. In a study of Red Guard factionalism in Beijing, academic Andrew G. Walder concludes that the decisive factor in factional grouping was the choices made by movement participants in the early stages of the Cultural Revolution.

In the early phase of the Cultural Revolution, many rebel groups traveled to Beijing to petition central leaders, including seeking confirmation that the rebel group's approach was revolutionary as opposed to counterrevolutionary. Central leaders would hear their perspective, give advice, and explain central policies, but rarely gave these petitioners orders.

As the Cultural Revolution progressed, they had become an important faction of the Red Guards by early 1967. Mao Zedong and the left wing of the Party (such as the Central Cultural Revolution Group) supported them at that time. However, further divisions occurred within the rebel faction as well. They still recognized the overall situation in China compared to the more leftist and radical "ultra-leftists".
