= Chinese dama =

Term for Chinese middle-aged women

- Traditional Chinese: 中國大媽
- Simplified Chinese: 中国大妈
- Literal meaning: Chinese big mother
Transcriptions
Standard Mandarin
- Hanyu Pinyin: Zhōngguó dà mā
Yue: Cantonese
- Jyutping: Zung^{1} Gwok^{3} daai^{6} maa^{1}

Chinese dama (simplified Chinese: 中国大妈; traditional Chinese: 中國大媽; lit. 'Chinese big mother') is a term for describing Chinese middle-aged women. The term has several meanings and has experienced changes over the years. The most prevalent definition is of Chinese middle-aged women who through investment, social, and fashion choices behave differently from women their age in earlier generations owing to the massive social, economic, and demographic changes they have experienced.

Historically, "dama" had three meanings: an aunt, a married woman between 40 and 60 years old, and the first wife of a man who had multiple wives. The term had a positive connotation and was a term of endearment for modest housewives who may not have been familiar with the latest trends. In 2013, as gold prices dropped, middle-aged Chinese women poured large sums of money into purchasing gold. Their actions were owing to social and economic reasons. Flush with discretionary income and in charge of how household money is spent, the women viewed gold as the perfect gift for daughters and daughters-in-law.

The gold prices rose owing to the massive economic bubble created by the damas' purchases. Currency Wars author Song Hongbing was the first person to refer to the gold-purchasing women as "damas". In August 2013, The Wall Street Journal published a video about the damas' impact on the gold sector, becoming the first English-language publication to use the pinyin representation of the phrase. The media showered praise on the damas for outsmarting Wall Street investors before turning on them once gold prices dropped. As the damas were depicted as greedy women who blindly invested in gold, the term "dama" transformed into having negative connotations. Damas were portrayed as having little consideration for their fellow citizens. The stereotypical image of damas is of women who like to go square dancing to exercise and build friendships with other women their age. Negative media coverage has focused on the dancing damas' playing of loud music in public spaces which has generated numerous conflicts with nearby residents. Damas frequently wear brightly colored attire, low-heeled slip-on shoes, and tights; are unreserved in their interactions; thrive in unbridled friendship with women around their age. They spend a large amount of time on social media, particularly WeChat, to exchange information with their family and friends. In addition to gold, they have invested in real estate both locally and abroad, bitcoin, and the local stock market.

Damas lived through the Great Leap Forward and the Cultural Revolution, periods marked by starvation and great adversity, which molded them into the frugal people they are today. The Cultural Revolution led to a societal decrease in filial piety and an increased focus on youth, while life expectancy increases have caused the dama to be considered late middle-age instead of elderly. In a world where previous examples of aging have become obsolete, the damas have forged their own way of growing old. Society has at times misunderstood and mocked their attempts. Teng Wei, a professor at South China Normal University wrote, "When we use dama as an insult, what we're really doing is suggesting that there's something inherently wrong with being a middle-aged woman. It's ageist, classist — and it's time to stop."

== Etymology ==
=== Historical meaning: positive connotation ===
Historically, the Chinese phrase "dama" (simplified Chinese: 中国大妈; traditional Chinese: 中國大媽), or "zhongguo dama", had a favorable connotation. Prior to its receiving international attention in 2013, "dama" had two common meanings according to the Contemporary Chinese Dictionary. The first meaning was an aunt, a woman married to the older brother of a person's father. The second meaning was to deferentially refer to a married woman between 40 and 60 years old. The commonly held historical belief was that damas were honorable and modest housewives who devoted their time to cooking, homemaking, keeping track of household expenditures, and bartering with shop owners. Xing Wen wrote in China Today, "To Chinese people, dama is an affectionate term, as they are always considered the most hospitable and trustworthy of people." Women were called dama as a term of endearment and to reflect that they as older people were not familiar with the latest trends. Traditional Chinese customs profoundly shaped the damas' outlook and behavior. A third meaning of "dama" was a man's first wife in the historic era when men could have concubines.

=== Gold purchases ===
==== History ====
In the middle of April 2013, China's bull market, which had been going on for a while, seemed on the verge of ending. The global gold price dropped from US$1,550 to US$1,321 per ounce. The falling gold prices largely were caused by the belief that the Federal Reserve would taper off on quantitative easing in 2013 owing to the American economy's improvements after the 2008 financial crisis. In reaction to the dropping of gold's price on 6 April, many Chinese people but middle-aged Chinese women in particular hurriedly bought large amounts of the metal. Rushing into stores in mainland China, Hong Kong, and Macau, the women caused the gold price have the highest one-day growth that year, shooting up to US$1,462 per ounce on 26 April 2013. The excitement to purchase gold affected countries outside of China including India, Singapore, the United Kingdom, and the United States, but analysts found that Chinese investors were the primary cause of the gold prices spiking up.

Currency Wars author Song Hongbing in 2013 originated and popularized the new meaning of the word "damas" as referring to the gold-purchasing women in China. In an interview published on 1 May 2013 by China National Radio, Song said, "It's not just China's damas who are fighting [to purchase gold]. I estimate that the entire world's damas are fighting. The price of gold was not as predicted by Goldman Sachs at the time. It will fall to 1,100, and physical buying around the world may play a major supporting role." Song jested that with regard to the global gold market, the damas were vying with experienced Wall Street investors. Within a short period of time, Chinese media and blogs participated in overpraising the middle-aged women. Using poorly cited material, they asserted that investment giants like Goldman Sachs had been defeated by the damas. On 12 August 2013, The Wall Street Journal released a video reporting on the damas' actions. The American newspaper's video was among the first times that a significant English-language publication had referenced "dama". It was the first time that "dama" was used as an English word to refer to women who purchased gold. The Wall Street Journal defined damas as "bargain-hunting middle-aged Chinese women" who "keep a tight grip on the family purse and an eagle eye on gold prices". Chinese netizens avidly discussed the newspaper's remark about damas on social media. The news media outside of China published headlines like "Chinese dama won the Wall Street predators" and "Chinese dama dancing in front of Louvre". The media previously had paid little attention to damas until their gold purchases.

Damas spent hundreds of billions of yuan to purchase gold in 2013. Their massive buying of gold generated a bubble, leading to a steep drop in gold prices and a concomitant shattering of the damas' reputation. The news media turned on the damas. Having recently lauded the damas for being an exemplar of China's rise, the media began mocking the damas for being sheeple who lacked economics knowledge. Throughout China, the damas were mocked as being aged women who were entertaining themselves in a fun activity they had no proficiency in. Numerous people in China thought the damas' boorish scramble to purchase gold had shamed their country. Their behavior showcased how China was prone to go on illogical buying sprees as a country newly rich in the worldwide arena. In a 2014 paper, the Chinese author Jiang Fangzhou summed up the situation, "Patriots held up Chinese damas as national heroes capable of conquering the financial giants of the West, but the image these women projected on the international stage was not altogether an impressive one." In the Journal of Hengyang Normal University, two Chinese scholars wrote in 2015 that Westerners consumed negative coverage of damas as being greedy, ignorant, and unworldly.

The damas' gold purchases led to China purchasing 41.4% more gold compared to the previous year. This caused China to pass India in becoming the biggest purchaser of gold in 2013. In subsequent years, the price of gold stayed down which forced the damas to have their money stuck in a poorly performing investment. The word "dama" was included in the economic section of the "Spring-Summer China Mainstream Newspaper Buzzwords" list that the Beijing Language and Culture University's National Language Resources Monitoring and Research Center released in 2013. In collaboration with the media, the center published a "Top 10 Cyber Words of 2013" list that included "dama". Zhang Weiwei, a professor at Fudan University, said "dama" was "a little bit analogous to" Susan Boyle.

==== Social and economic context for gold purchases ====
The damas were motivated to fervently invest large sums of money into gold owing to social and economic factors. In China, a predominant belief is that gold is a prized entity that will always retain its value. Chinese people, both historically and contemporarily, have viewed gold as being a fitting gift for their descendants. Although expert investors generally do not consider gold coins, gold bars, and gold jewelry to be solid investments, Chinese society finds them to be must-haves. When Chinese people get married, customs dictate that gold is essential for the dowry and bride price. When the damas observed the gold price decline, they viewed the situation as a perfect time to secure the discounted goods which they saw as impeccable presents for their daughters and daughters-in-law.

Women in a large number of Chinese households, particularly those in the middle-class, make decisions about how money is spent. Their husbands hand over their wages to the women who return a small amount for "cigarette money". The damas' ability to purchase a large amount of gold was a consequence of Chinese households' sharp increase in disposable income. Between 2000 and 2013, the country's gross domestic product (GDP) grew from CN¥10 trillion (US$1.2 trillion) to CN¥57 trillion (US$9.1 trillion), while the urban per capita income exploded from CN¥6,000 (US$700) to CN¥27,000 (US$4,400). As women become older and are closer to or are at retirement, they get more careful about how money is spent. Economic factors spurred the damas to spurn other investment options and instead embrace gold. The damas found that bank accounts had interest rates lower than the cost increases for everyday good and services. Noticing that the real estate market had increased rules, the damas viewed the sector as having a lower risk–return tradeoff. The stock market's feeble performance led numerous retail investors to have less money. After observing the current economic conditions, the damas began buying gold with their discretionary income, viewing the metal as a conservative investment that would better ensure their financial peace of mind.

Damas came from the first generation of Chinese women who "enjoyed equal rights as men", according to China Today. Through employment, the women took on the joint duty of financially providing for their households. Through work, the women broadened their social network which increased their opportunities to hear about anything new. As their nation underwent transformations, the women kept up and were courageous enough to try activities they had not previously done.

=== Later meaning: negative connotation ===
Years after the gold purchases, the "dama" moniker persists despite the dimming from society's consciousness of the damas' 2013 scramble to buy gold. South China Normal University professor Teng Wei said that the term's durability is likely owing to its providing a convenient nickname to refer to middle-aged Chinese women who contravene societal expectations of being maternal and refined. The women are blamed for numerous social issues. They are repeatedly depicted as completely tactless, self-centered, and fond of spreading rumors. Any defiant older woman is likely to be branded as a dama.

"Dama" has morphed into a term with a more expansive meaning. The media wrote articles with the headlines "After gold fever cools down, Chinese Dama catch the emerald fever", "Chinese Dama rush to buy houses overseas", and "noisy square dance of Chinese Dama invite US police officers" to reflect the damas' interest in other investments. The term's wide use led to a surge in purchases of the Lao Gan Ma sauce since the brand's name means "dama". "Dama" has "mixed connotations". According to Renmin University of China scholar Qin Li, news organizations frequently feature unfavorable coverage about damas which are more broadly disseminated than affirmative stories. Li cited two extensively reported examples of how the media "distort[s] the Dama image". The first story took place in a Beijing street in 2013 when a dama was widely and unfairly criticized for allegedly trying to extort a youthful man who was from another country for making her fall. It turned out that the man had engaged in wrong-way driving and red light running and had exploded in an anger at the dama he had struck who had been obeying traffic laws in crossing the street. The second story took place in a Wuhan subway in 2015 when a dama struck a young woman. Li speculated that individuals refer to the dama with a disdainful and mocking tone since they despise the wealthy and want to protest against wealth inequality. The term has grown into having unfavorable overtones. The media has used "dama" to disparagingly refer to older women who on overseas trips acted disorderly and improperly as well to women who blare music when square dancing and brawling with others over their use of public spaces. Damas are viewed as provocateurs by some people owing to the negative media coverage. Writing in The New York Times, editor Wang Junling said that it was incorrect to stereotype and there is not even a "clear definition" of what a dama is. Wang wrote, "The various deeds of the aforementioned damas have no logical connection. As long as middle-aged and elderly women in China do something different, they can be labeled as such." Netizens attacked the writer Fang Fang as unpatriotic and called her "Fang Dama" (Chinese: 方大妈) in response to her writing of the Wuhan Diary about the COVID-19 pandemic in Wuhan. By invoking the word "dama", the online commenters aimed to discredit Fang's diary, portraying her as being like the "annoying, unfashionable and uncultured middle-aged women".

Julie Kleeman, an Oxford University Press project manager for Bilingual Dictionaries, said in 2013 that the term "dama" could be added to the Oxford English Dictionary (OED). Kleeman said the British public were following China as demonstrated by the use of the terms "dama" and "tuhao" but that the OED had to monitor their usage longer before making a decision on inclusion in the OED. By 2015, "dama" had still not been added to the OED.

=== Morphology ===
"Dama" is an English loanword of Chinese origin. It is the pinyin representation of a Chinese phrase that refers to middle-aged women. The term is a concatenation of the word "big" (Chinese: 大) and the word "mom" (simplified Chinese: 妈; traditional Chinese: 媽). Although the literal meaning of "dama" is "big mother", "big mom", or "big mama", a more accurate meaning is "auntie" though it has no precise English counterpart. The English-language press adopted the term for that reason and as it can be pronounced without difficulty. The male analogous to "dama" is "dashu", meaning uncle. The Cantonese version of "dama" is "dai ma".

In the Journal of Leshan Teachers College, the scholar Wang Shuang said it is a Chinglish phrase that demonstrates the increasing influence of China and argued that it is fine for Chinese learners of English to learn English with Chinese attributes instead of aimlessly trying to learn the "authentic" Standard English spoken by those on the BBC and Voice of America. In the Journal of Hengyang Normal University, two Chinese scholars said that as a country achieves greater influence in the global economy, it also has a large influence on language as demonstrated by Westerners' adoption of the term "dama" to refer to the middle-aged Chinese women whose purchases had a strong impact on the gold market. The academic Jiang Jing lamented in Overseas English that the adoption of the "dama" loan word was negative. It led to damas' forming a reputation both at home and worldwide for being impulsive and irrational, subjecting them to a lot of mockery, she said.

=== Investments outside of gold ===
While damas have received significant attention for their gold investments, they have invested in disparate sectors. Damas thronged the 2014 Beijing Spring Real Estate Trade Fair. In China, numerous older people in the middle class like to sightsee. When they visit provinces like Hainan and Yunnan, they are captivated by the southern areas' mild climate. The cost of housing in these regions is substantially more affordable compared to the high prices in the metropolises of Beijing, Guangzhou, and Shanghai. By purchasing housing in the southern provinces, the damas could fulfill two goals: purchase a vacation home and secure a conservative way to invest their money. Damas were interested in international housing including in the United States and Jeju Island in South Korea. Their interest in owning property in Jeju Island was rooted in how ownership would help them secure permanent residency in South Korea. Damas invested in the Chinese stock market which at the time had been performing remarkably well before becoming turbulent in 2015.

Damas began acquiring antiques and exploring bitcoin and peer-to-peer lending. In reference to their bitcoin investing, they are known as "bì mā" (simplified Chinese: 币妈; traditional Chinese: 幣媽), an abbreviation of "biquan dama" which is defined as "coin-circle aunties". Damas comprised 40% of the investors who in 2013 spent more than CN¥10 million (US$1.7 million) on Huobi, the biggest platform for trading bitcoin at the time.

== Social activities ==
=== Square dancing ===
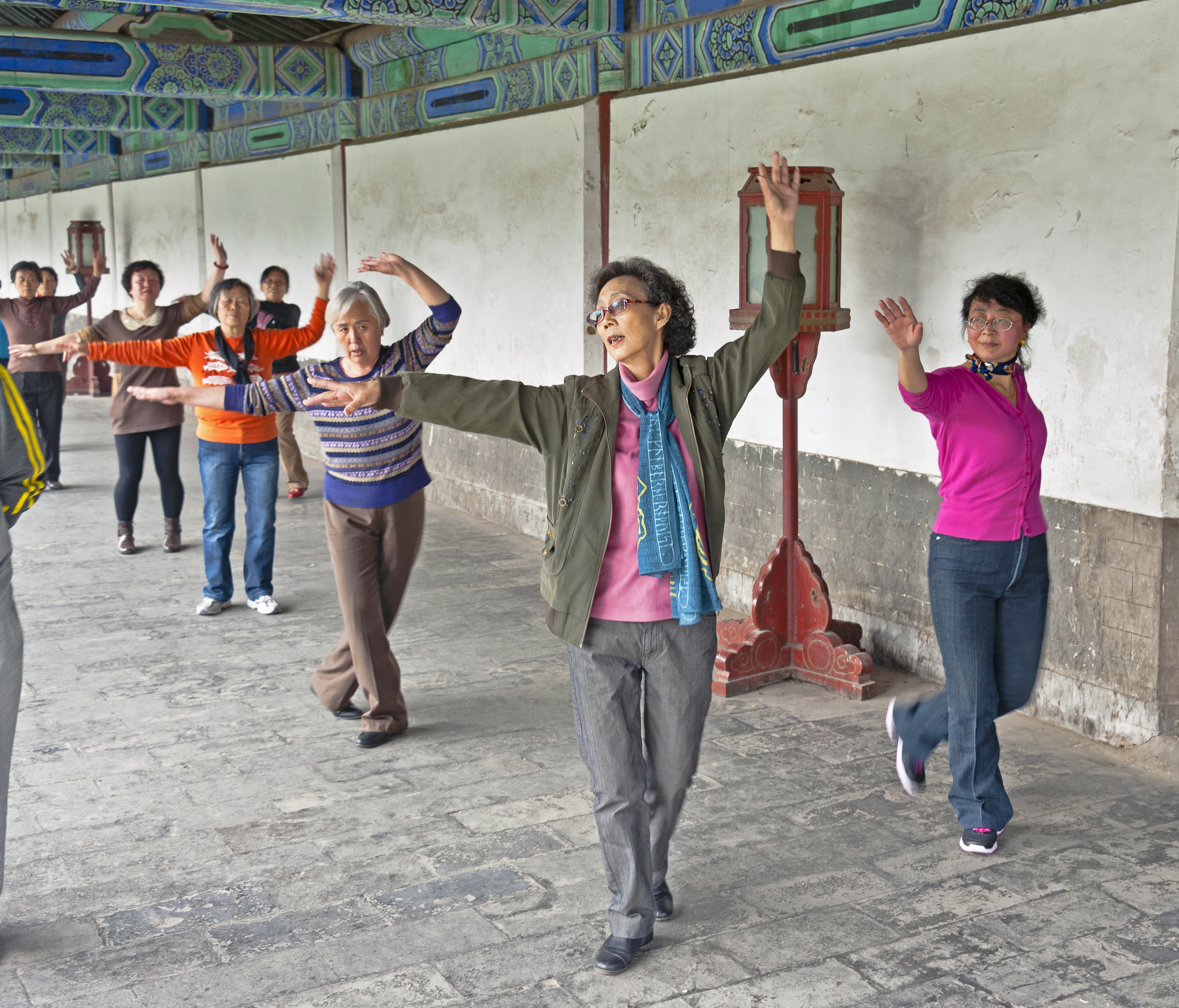
Older square dancers at Temple of Heaven Park in Beijing, 2014

China's square dancing grannies frequently take over public spaces to do spontaneous dancing. Square dancing refers not to a particular dance form but to doing the activity in a public square. There are roughly 100 million individuals, largely women who participate in the dancing. Not all damas square dance, and not all females who square dance are damas. Square dancing (simplified Chinese: 广场舞; traditional Chinese: 廣場舞; pinyin: guǎngchǎng wǔ) is frequently called "dàmā wǔ" (simplified Chinese: 大妈舞; traditional Chinese: 大媽舞), which literally means "dama dance" owing to the deep connection between damas and square dancing.

The damas' activities generated a lot of noise, leading to conflicts with people living close by, which the media enjoyed writing about. In a 2018 dispute, a man was said to have died following a heart attack that stemmed from a dancing granny's vehement altercation with him. In another dispute, a man set his three Tibetan Mastiffs on the damas after he discharged his shotgun towards the sky. Describing the dama dancers as having more clout than the local government, the social commentator Zhang Tianpan said the women were like warriors, "They are invincible, and people flee before them." According to Teng Wei, the scholar, the media was exaggerating the dancer conflicts, which builds on the dama lore. She bemoaned that older women who were merely seeking friendship and physical activity were being baselessly cast as "a malignant social force that everyone — even officials — must tiptoe around". An opinion piece in China Daily noted that someone had purportedly taken a picture of damas doing a square dance outside the Louvre and if the image was authentic, the damas "have indeed given the group dance form with Chinese characteristics a bad name". During the China Digital Entertainment Expo & Conference in 2014, damas danced for free to the Phoenix Legend song "The Hottest Ethnic Trend" at a company's booth at the company's invitation. Holding a banner with the words "Enjoy the game, but remember to keep everything in moderation", the damas delivered a message to both video game fanatics and overenthusiastic square dancers about moderation. The damas sparked controversy after three images were shared online of them dancing on a Sichuan expressway as their bus had been halted because of a collision. A member of the traffic police that patrols the expressway said, "No matter how long the traffic jam lasts, dancing on the expressway is illegal. It's too dangerous."

In the largest protest against damas in Hong Kong, 1,800 protesters demonstrated at Tuen Mun Park and on the nearby streets on 6 July 2019. The protesters alleged that the damas had blared music from loudspeakers to accompany their dancing, were scantily clad, had sex with people who went to the parks, and received tips in the form of red envelopes from old men. A protest coordinator, the Tuen Mun Park Sanitation Concern Group, said that the Leisure and Cultural Services Department (LCSD) was not doing enough to prevent the damas' noise pollution and panhandling. According to the LCSD, in the preceding half-year, residents had filed 342 grievances regarding the Tuen Mun Park dancing in which 80 percent were related to noise.

=== Social media ===
Damas previously spent a large amount of time watching television. One common saying was "The remote control of Chinese Dama can influence the decision-making of TV stations". The women moved to spending a substantial amount of time on social media as advances in technology led to an increase in the number of easy-to-understand mobile apps. They enjoy using WeChat to exchange data with their family, and WeChat with its free video chat feature allows them not to have to send text messages or make phone calls. On WeChat, they post images of their dogs and ask their acquaintances to watch over the dogs when they are not near their houses. Damas who take care of children discuss children's birthday presents and schooling in the WeChat groups. Using WeChat, they advertise, buy, and sell items such as baked rolls through Internet stores. They prefer using WeChat, particularly the Moments feature, which has access controls and is more private than Sina Weibo and microblogs. To see information posted by the damas on WeChat Moments, people need to have been explicitly granted access. As people new to the digital world, damas are at risk of being scammed by online organizations selling inferior goods. The academic Qin Li said, "The use of social media by Chinese Dama can be observed as a benchmark of social change more generally. ... Social media will play an irreplaceable role in shaping a positive image for the Dama and fostering the sound development of society in the future."

=== Other activities ===
Damas are subjected to contempt even when not being mocked for stubbornness and boorishness. When older women swung silk scarves back and forth and shared the images online, primarily men vloggers mocked them as being "silk scarf grannies". Damas received positive coverage in China Today which noted that in numerous areas, they offer to sanitize public spaces and do other altruistic work such as make social calls on senior citizens. During the opening ceremony of the Reproductive Health Industrial Expo held in Xi'an in 2014, damas demonstrated at the event. Lobbing eggs at models and entertainers at the event, the damas spoke passionately against eroticism as detrimental to society and in favor of the chastity as a traditional Chinese value.

Damas frequently take photos with each other and make wide use of selfie sticks. Instead of being examples of conceitedness, the photos represent their companionship. According to the scholar Qin Li, the women's activities have many parallels to what happens in a WeChat group. The women are deeply into card playing and talking about the different items they have purchased. When tourists go on shopping visits in China, damas make up a huge contingent of the group.

== Characteristics ==
Damas live on fixed income and generally live in urban areas though are not metropolitan people. They are financially stable though are not as wealthy as women who are white-collar workers or in senior management. Damas are unconcerned when they draw the notice of people they do not know. As shopping enthusiasts, damas do not purchase items that are not discounted. At the farmers' market, damas enjoy negotiating the price of cabbage to be five cents cheaper but are inclined to spend lavishly on a gold bar costing several hundred thousand yuan. They have an instinctive knowledge of what return on investment is, though they do not devote time to investment literature. Biased towards investments that they are able to physically handle, damas spend their money on real estate. Advertisements have little influence on damas even though they exhibit a herd mentality. The women place their confidence in nearby residents and friends.

According to the scholar Claudia Huang, "the typical dama look is resolutely feminine without pretention or reference to romance and sexuality." The China Daily columnist Raymond Zhou said about damas, "They talk about using various brands of cosmetics, but they often look like victims of fashion." Although each person dresses differently, there is an established dama mode of appearance. They like to get their hair permed or colored, typically in hues of auburn. Damas go without makeup other than drawing in eyebrows. Huang said the damas' appearance is paradoxical. First, based on cultural standards, the women do not appear young or old. Second, although their appearance is deliberate, it is not quite stylish. Third, they are quickly discernible but hard to specify. The damas do not base their conduct and image on attracting men like their husbands. Some of their choices are based on a longing to seem younger. When a woman refers to herself as a dama, she indicates that she has stopped being youthful and sexually attractive. Damas do not come across as venerable elderly women as they are actively visible in the community and adopt the styles of the youthful. The women wear brightly colored attire, low-heeled slip-on shoes, and tights; are unreserved in their interactions; and thrive in unbridled friendship with women around their age.

== Social and economic context ==
Damas behave differently from women their age in earlier generations owing to the massive social, economic, and demographic changes. Over the course of these women's lifetimes, the life expectancy in China has increased dramatically. The World Bank reported that for people born in China, the life expectancy increased from 44 years old to 76 years old when comparing someone born in 1960 and someone born in 2016. The premature deaths in 1960 were owing to malnutrition, maternal death, childhood diseases, among other reasons. The sharp reduction in premature deaths was caused by the substantial progress made in standard of living, health care, and nutrition. In the modern era, Chinese city dwellers frequently live to be octogenarians and nonagenarians. Sexagenarian damas are now considered "late middle-aged" despite having been considered senior citizens decades ago. As a result, the damas are not given the deference that people their age had received in past generations.

The scholar Claudia Huang said that although the fact that the population has aged so much alone would be consequential, the consequences have been amplified by "a seismic shift in China's age-based social hierarchy". The Confucian teaching, Classic of Filial Piety, taught people to always respect and accede to their elders. During the New Culture Movement in 1911 and the Chinese Communist Revolution in the 1940s, scholars denounced filial piety, viewing that submitting to older people was why China was languishing both economically and technologically. In 1966, when Mao Zedong started the Cultural Revolution, he aimed to change Chinese cultural practices with regard to reverence of elders. Less experienced but more pliable people ousted those who had been in their positions for a while. Under this new framework where being older does not immediately grant people more prestige, the damas do not receive reverence from society.

Owing to the one-child policy and a society focused on youth, damas have been unable to follow examples from previous generations of receiving deference from their children and grandchildren as the damas have grown older. Since the past examples of how to act as older women have become unsupportable and outdated, the women have forged their own path of how to grow old. Chinese society frequently misinterprets or holds the women's efforts in contempt. The scholar Claudia Huang wrote, "[T]he efforts of women who identify as dama to grow older on their own terms and in a manner that's consistent with their present social contexts has significant ramifications for Chinese society as a whole. By creating a gendered aesthetic of aging that reflects and responds to their generational experiences, these women are challenging others to re-imagine what old age can look like and feel like."

Having experienced the Great Leap Forward and the Cultural Revolution, damas are conditioned by arduous circumstances. Owing to the starvation and destitution they have experienced, they scrimp to such an extent that it is unfathomable for people born later. As they face major changes like children moving out or the death of a husband, the women turn to purchases to shape their identity. Through their substantial funds, urban damas can purchase items and experiences that fulfill their need to show off their status. The scholars Meng Wang and Florian Kohlbacher identified four types of dama. The first type, the "pragmatic dama", are willing spend more on goods related to health, food, and children despite their usual scrimping. The second type, the "modest dama", do not care how they are viewed in society and are content with their material possessions so will not buy more items for themselves. They are motivated to increase their expenditures on grandchildren and elderly parents they provide caretaking for to improve their quality of life. The third type, the "poseur dama", enjoys influencing how society views her and her family by spending more on premium brands such as the top-rated and costliest local junior high school. The fourth type, the "wealthy dama", comes from a highly educated and highly paid background. Unbothered by higher prices, they will spend more to improve their lifestyle such as buying expensive, premier cosmetics.

The term "dama" has been applied to women living in rural areas. In a country that is undergoing massive changes, the rural dama are not seeing the benefits compared to urban women and rural men. Whereas urban dama frequently are known as "industrial workers, urban citizens or market consumers", rural dama are excluded from these activities. Although numerous village women do migrant work, as they age, to start families they usually go back to the countryside alongside other left behind women.

== Media coverage and entertainment ==
Damas frequently are the targets of ridicule in variety shows, magazines, and blogs for their quirks and attire. Rarely is it praise when a middle-aged woman is labeled a dama. 81% of answerers in a Sina Weibo poll running between April 2013 and January 2014 felt animosity against damas. In a News World study of damas published in 2014, the media coverage of damas was at 15% positive, 75% negative, and 10% neutral. The coverage largely concentrated on unfavorable stories like thrifty damas hurrying to purchase gold and locals complaining about rambunctious square dancing damas.

Li Lin-rong and Li Xi-xi, scholars from the Southwest University of Political Science & Law, published a study in 2018 in Editors' Friend about the media coverage of damas between 2007 and 2017. The study covered three newspapers: China Women's News, People's Daily, and Southern Metropolis Daily. They found that between 2007 and 2012, the newspapers had very positive coverage of how damas were indefatigable, compassionate, and willing to help others. Between 2013 and 2015, there was a significant shift from promotion of the damas' positive traits to denouncing the damas with negative news coverage about greed for gold and generating noise complaints and conflicts from square dancing. Between 2016 and 2017, the newspapers devoted less coverage to damas compared to the 2013–2015 period (though still more than the 2007–2012 period) and had more balanced coverage about them.

Damas have been featured on television shows. In 2011, the "Magic Voice Dama" competed in the second series of China's Got Talent. In 2013, a vegetable seller dama was featured on the show I Want to Join the Spring Festival (Chinese: 我要上春晚). The scholar Qin Li said that the damas in entertainment had "diversified the overall image of this group and enhanced their social influence". Damas in Qingdao, Shandong, wear the facekini, which covers the entire face save for the mouth, nose, and eyes, to protect themselves from the sun as they desire light skin. In the August 2014 edition of the magazine CR Fashion Book, photographer Alexandra Utzmann published a set of photos titled "Masking in the Sun" that featured people wearing the facekini. She said that the damas had been the stimulus for the series. This led to information about the series trending on Sina Weibo, and fashion expert Hung Huang saying, "It shows that fashion can draw inspiration from anywhere and anyone." The YouTube channel FHProductionHK uploaded a video titled "Dama's Logic" (Chinese: 大媽的道理), which ranked eighth on YouTube's "top 10 trending videos" list in 2019, mocking how strained relationships are between Chinese Damas and Hong Kong inhabitants.

== Comparison to other subcultures ==
Teng Wei, a professor at South China Normal University, said that damas were middle-aged women who sought friendship and exercise. She noted that the bourgeoisie are not ostracized when they buy a gym pass or develop a phony hiking passion. Nor are younger women mocked after they devote several hours to improving the selfie they make. Reflecting on the double standards, she concluded, "When we use dama as an insult, what we're really doing is suggesting that there's something inherently wrong with being a middle-aged woman. It's ageist, classist — and it's time to stop."

In the late 2000s, many rural Chinese youth followed the shamate subculture of wearing bombastic attire and sporting eccentric hairdos. Middle-class youth from urban areas mocked the rural shamate dwellers as being uncultivated and pretentious, frequently in a manner that revealed their intolerance of countryside dwellers. By diminishing people who had a less powerful upbringing, the urban youth sought to demonstrate their supremacy. The scholar Teng Wei compared the vilification of the shamate to the disparaging of the dama years later.

== Bibliography ==
- Li, Qin (June 2017). "Characteristics and social impact of the use of social media by Chinese Dama". Telematics and Informatics. 34 (3): 797–810. doi:10.1016/j.tele.2016.05.020.
