= Lin Zhao =

Chinese dissident executed during the Cultural Revolution

- 林昭
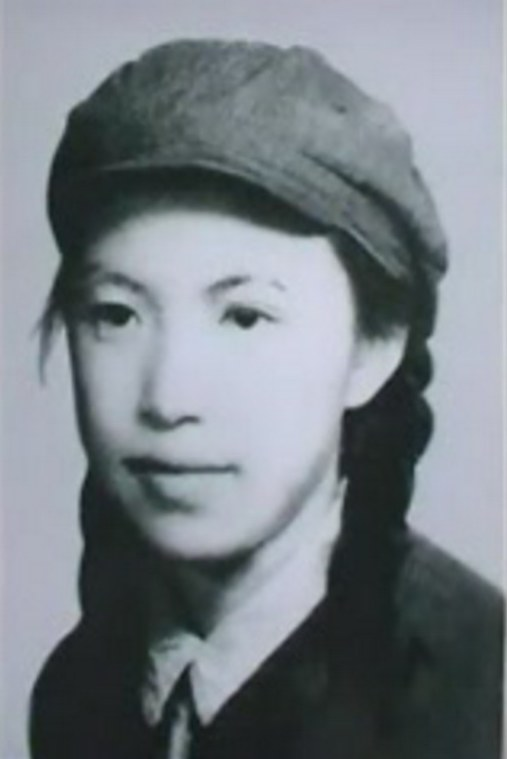
- Lin Zhao, undated photo
- Born: Peng Lingzhao; 23 January 1932; Suzhou, Jiangsu, China
- Died: 29 April 1968 (aged 36); Shanghai Longhua Airport
- Cause of death: Execution by firing squad
- Education: Peking University
- Parent(s): Peng Guoxian (彭国彦); Xu Xianmin (许宪民)

Lin Zhao (Chinese: 林昭; 23 January 1932 – 29 April 1968), born Peng Lingzhao (彭令昭), was a prominent Chinese dissident who was imprisoned and later executed by gunshot by the People's Republic of China during the Cultural Revolution for her criticism of Mao Zedong's policies. She is widely considered to be a martyr.

== Early life ==
Peng Lingzhao was born to a prominent family in Suzhou, Jiangsu province. By age 16, she had joined an underground Chinese Communist Party (CCP) cell and was writing articles criticizing the corruption of the Nationalist government under the pen name Lin Zhao. Three months before the CCP took power in mainland China, she ran away from home in order to attend a journalism school run by the CCP. During her tenure, she was assigned to work in a group to administer land reform in the countryside, where she witnessed the torture and violent deaths of landlords.

== Becoming a dissident ==
Lin later enrolled in the Chinese literature department at Peking University where she was an editor of the school paper Honglou (The Red Building) which met in her dorm room. During the Hundred Flowers Movement of 1956–1957, intellectuals such as herself were encouraged to criticize the CCP, but were later punished for doing so.

When Lin's friends who were part of the Red Building, Zhang Yuanxun and Shen Zeyi published a poem on a poster "This is the Time" which called for open dialogue towards reform, this opened debate at the university; the two also founded a short-lived magazine that lasted 23 days called "The Square" to talk about these ideas. During this time Lin Zhao published two poems, "It is Time" and "Party I Call out to You", which expressed faith in the Communist Party, but her disaffection with communists who had never "borne the heavy burden of discrimination, slight, and suspicion".

When Zhang Yuanxun was forced to endure a debate that was turning into a struggle session, Lin stood on top of a table and dressed down the mob saying "What kind of meeting are we having tonight? Is it a debate or a condemnation? It should not be a condemnation! We don't need to condemn anyone." Though Lin had criticized Zhang before herself, she did not feel condemning fellow communists was right.

In response to her friendship with members of The Square and defense of civil debate, Lin Zhao was branded a rightist in the Anti-Rightist Campaign which started in July 1957. She was the only rightist who refused to criticize and insisted she had done no wrong. As a result of being persecuted for this, Lin started to become a dissident. During 1958, Lin was ordered to perform menial tasks for the university, including killing mosquitoes as part of the Four Pests Campaign and cataloguing old newspapers for the reference library of the university's journalism department. There she met a fellow rightist Gan Cui, who in 1959 asked permission (as was required at the time) to marry Lin Zhao and be assigned to a job near her after his graduation. He was instead sent to Talimu Fourth Farm, Xinjiang, to a reform through labor camp for the next 20 years, to break the couple up. Gan visited Lin in Shanghai for a week, and then got on the bus to Xinjiang; they never saw each other again.

== "Lanzhou University Rightist Counter-Revolutionary Clique" ==
In late 1959, while on medical parole in Shanghai, Lin met Zhang Chunyuan, a history student and People's Liberation Army veteran. Zhang Chunyan was a leader of the so-called "Lanzhou University Rightist Counter-Revolutionary Clique" (as it was labeled later by authorities), who had traveled from his exile in Tianshui, Gansu to invite Lin to join his group after one of the group's members obtained her work from his sister, another "Rightist" at Peking University. Zhang had previously unsuccessfully tried to contact members of the Square, but they were denounced before he could contact them. After reading "Song of the Seagull" he decided to invite Lin Zhao to his group and was greatly pleased upon receiving from her a few drafts of her works for the "Spark Fire", an underground magazine he was working on.

Zhang, along with a fellow group member Gu Yan, discussed various topics with Lin Zhao before Zhang returned to Gansu. It was during these talks that Lin Zhao discovered, from the firsthand accounts by Zhang, about starvation and cannibalism that were happening as a result of the devastation in Gansu Province, where about 1 in 3 of the villagers around Tianshui had died, and where Zhang had seen human flesh for sale. A fellow Peking University student, Lui Faqing, who had been accused of being Rightist and sent to Gansu, was on the brink of death there due to starvation. Having learned of the situation there, Lin sent him 35 Jin (about 40lb) of grain ration coupons, which saved his life.

May 1960 marked the beginning for the group's downfall: Tan Chanxue, Zhang Chenyuan's partner and a core group member, was arrested trying to escape to Hong Kong. Zhang tried to free her using a fake Public Security ID, but was captured in the process. In late September, some 30 members of the group were arrested in Wushan County along with the local deputy secretary of the Communist Party Committee and the party secretary of the Chengguan People's Commune, Du Yinghua, who was charged with having been in communication with Zhang Chenyuan and allegedly supporting the group. On 24 October, Lin Zhao was arrested in Suzhou. On 23 November 1960 her father Peng Guoyan, reportedly distressed by his daughter's fate, ingested rat poison and died.

Lin Zhao was imprisoned in Shanghai No. 2 Detention house. In August 1961, Zhang Chenyuan had been able to escape and make his way to Shanghai. As a token of respect for Lin Zhao, Zhang circled her prison twice. He was arrested again 6 September 1961. He and Party Secretary, Du Yinghua, were executed 22 March 1970 for "attempting to communicate" with each other, as well as "engaging in counter-revolutionary activities" while in prison.

== Initial arrest and parole ==
After Zhang ChenYuan escaped, in August 1961 the prison tried to parole Lin Zhao due to her tuberculosis in order to use her as bait to capture Zhang. Lin Zhao refused parole and treatment.

In March 1962, she was granted and accepted parole due both her tuberculosis and to a softening of her views somewhat due to the ending of the Great Leap Forward and the 9th plenary session of the 8th Central Committee of the Chinese Communist Party, where economic policy was being changed to prevent starvation. Mao had effectively lost control of the Party since the 8th plenary session at Lushan. Chen Yun was effectively running the economy and turning it away from Maoism. He would later be purged for being a capitalist roader for this and sent to work in a factory for 3 years.

Lin Zhao returned to Suzhou and was told about the suicide of her father. Within a few weeks, she realized she had been mistaken, her fellow writers were still in jail, and while some economic reforms had taken place, it did not live up to her expectations. At the end of March, Lin Zhao informed the neighborhood police that she had packed her clothes and was ready to return to prison.

While waiting on the legal system to come for her, Lin Zhao approached Hu Ziheng, her former teacher at the South Jiangsu Journalism Vocational School, who was working for Liberation Daily. She publicly argued with him and satirized him. She met Huang Zheng, (recently returned from a labor camp) and convinced him to help her draft a political platform for the "Battle League of Free Youths of China". Which was in her mind, a future coalition of young, intellectual rightists, democracy activists, united in a non-violent movement for a renaissance of human liberation. She attempted to smuggle some of her writings out of China, via a stateless alien named Arnold Newman, asking him to share them with the world. He was promptly arrested, as Lin was being followed by the authorities. She also sent a letter to Lu Ping, the president of Peking University to try to get him to have the 800 students who had been sent to labor camps, freed. Lin Zhou did not seem to know, that over 300 of the rightists from Peking University had starved to death in Qinghe Laogai in 1960 alone.

In August, she was brought to court for her involvement with the Lanzhou University Rightist Counterrevolutionary Clique. She argued that it was just to oppose totalitarian rule, saying she would "fight to the death to oppose" it and that the real crime was not what she and the other rightists had done, but what the government had done to them. The judge, replied "Are you sick?" (mentally). In November, she was taken back into custody, and on 23 December 1962 she was transferred to the Shanghai Municipal Prison.

== Tilanqiao Prison & No. 1 Detention House ==
Lin Zhao was in Tilanqiao for eight and a half months. During this time she went on a hunger strike, stopped taking medicine for tuberculosis, and attempted suicide, resulting in her being locked in rubber cell. On 19 June she wrote a "Hunger Strike Declaration" in which she stated she "would rather spend the rest of my life in prison and wear out its floor; I vow to never be unworthy of my original aspirations or change a bit of my original ideas". She recruited a cellmate to the Battle League of Free Youths of China. When the new recruit was released, they made contact with Huang Zheng who was promptly arrested, unknown to her the cellmate had been recruited by the Police. Huang Zheng would receive 15 additional years in labor camps as a result. Lin also met Yu Yile, a Christian preacher, who tried unsuccessfully to get Lin Zhao to drop her political activism.

On 8 August 1963, Lin Zhao was transferred to Shanghai No. 1 Detention house for intensive interrogations. This was to be a very strict period of time, with prisoners forbidden from even sharing their names with each other, no mail services, and no family visits. Her files from this period were separate from those which were smuggled out of China later. Lin Zhao's own later writings make up entirely what is known about this period. She alleges that she faced sexual harassment, and when she submitted a formal report to the prison authorities this resulted in harsher treatment, such as long periods of time spent in handcuffs. One of the female guards also pulled her hair out and beat her while she was handcuffed to a chair. She again submitted a report, and the prison informed her that she may use self-defense, an absurd notion for a cuffed prisoner locked in a chair.

On 24 November, Lin Zhao learned of the assassination of John F. Kennedy. She had admired him, from the few statements that Chinese state media had printed. She wrote "Mourning inside a Jail Cell" in response and pledged to visit his tomb one day to pay her respects, but contented herself for the moment in believing that he was able to see "inside a certain prison in Red China, a young soldier of freedom, with wounds from shackles in her arms, was propping up her sick body, and using a straw stem as her pen and the crudest ink and paper, silently writing down her mourning and her grief for you".

Someone (unnamed) was sent to live in her cell, who issued beatings and verbal abuse day and night. On 5 February 1964, she attempted suicide by swallowing medicated soap. She wrote a Self Eulogy in blood, this was her first work written in blood, and likely was written just before attempting suicide. Among this writing, was the words that would later be etched on her own tomb in red letters mimicking the original:

Freedom is without a price
yet within bounds my life lies
Shattered Jade is what I will to be,
Offered to China as a sacrifice!

Lin Zhao's writing at the time identified her with the traditional Confucian scholar, who had through history, given up their lives to preserve their dignity.

On 12 April 1964, Lin Zhao wrote a poem "Family Sacrifice" in memory of Xu Jinyuan, her uncle, The Party Secretary of the Communist Youth League in Suzhou who had been executed by the Nationalists in the Shanghai massacre.

12 April a date buried in dust,
Who still remembers the blood shed 37 years ago?
The dead is gone; his descendant commemorates him,
But the blood and tears were shed in vain,
Uncle, your niece cries for you in the red prison.
I know you – in the melody of the International,
You taught my mother, who taught me.
If only you knew, the millions of people you gave your life for,
Are still not free today and are hungry slaves!

Many of her other writings from this period are lost or still in locked archives.

On 4 November 1964 Lin Zhao was indicted as the principle criminal of the Battle League of Free Youth of China Counterrevolutionary Clique, as well as plotting to publicize A Spark of Fire with the Lanzhou University Rightists, participation in other counterrevolutionary activities both on parole and in prison, and attempting to overthrow "the people's democratic dictatorship" amongst other crimes..

She again attempted suicide by cutting her left wrist. However, when on 5 December, when she was being tried for "Resorting to loud shouting in an effort to instigate the inmates into an insurrection" She responded that "The indictment neglected to list the important fact that, while in prison, I established an ordnance bureau and build three munitions factories and two arsenals".

However, she did understand that in effect the conclusion of the trial would not be in her favor, and her only hope to a long sentence without surrendering and agreeing to reform was help from above. In accordance with Chinese tradition, she wrote to the mayor of Shanghai, Ke Qingshi, asking for his intervention. Ke was an early communist whose wife had been driven to suicide during a purge. Mao had personally spared him, he was as a result, was strongly tied with Mao. She wrote two letters to him, finishing the second in February. On 10 April 1965, Liberation Daily reported Ke's death. Lin Zhao saw a connection where one was not; she assumed that Ke had taken up her case with Mao and been killed as a result. It is during this time that Lin Zhao seems to have been driven into state of conspiracy that affected her sanity. In fairness, she had been followed by police, and had an informer sent to befriend her. Alongside her actual mental instability, caused by the belief that her last hope had been murdered, there was the fact that the State really was out to get her.

Lin Zhao conducted a spirit marriage between herself and Ke. She did still consider Ke an enemy as a party official, however, she considered it also an act of protest against Mao personally, as she wrongly believed he had Ke Qingshe killed.

In May 1965, Zhang Yuanxun, who had been in a labor camp since his arrest in 1958, was given a week pass he travel to Shanghai and visited Lin Zhao claiming to be her fiancé, his goal was to try to make Lin Zhao accept reform. On the 6th, he was allowed to see her and she used the chance to list wrongs that were done to her by the guards, of whom, at least a dozen were present in the room with Lin and Zhang. The guards alleged she was crazy, and Lin denied that she was, and pointed out that crazy people were not jailed for their words as she was. Lin presented him with a small sailboat made from candy wrappers, she asked Zhang to look after her family, and to "tell people in the future about this suffering". Zhang Yuanxun kept this for more than 30 years, before passing the sailboat to the filmmaker Jie Hu.

As Zhang Yuanxun left, he and Lin's mother were told by a director from the Shanghai Public Security Bureau "We have done what we can for Lin Zhao. She refuses to be educated, and chooses to resist to the end. It's a dead end there is nothing more we can do."

On 16 May 1966, Mao Zedong started work to launch the Cultural Revolution.

On 31 May 1965, Lin Zhao was sentenced to 20 years imprisonment as a political prisoner

In a report dated 5 December 1966, it was recommended that Lin be executed based on "serious crimes" which included:

1. Insanely attacking, cursing, and slandering our great Chinese Communist Party and our great leader Chairman Mao...
2. Regarding the proletarian dictatorship and socialist system with extreme hostility and hatred...
3. Publicly shouting reactionary slogans, disrupting prison order, instigating other prisoners to rebel, and broadcasting threats to take revenge on behalf of executed counter-revolutionary criminals...
4. Persistently maintaining a reactionary stand, refusing to admit her crimes, resisting discipline and education, and defying reform...

== Execution ==
Lin was executed by gunshot on 29 April 1968. Lin's family was not made aware of her death until a CCP official approached her mother on 1 May 1968 to collect a five-cent bullet fee for the bullet used to kill her.

== Themes ==
Lin Zhao's available writings often utilize her knowledge of history and classical Chinese literature. They are influenced by various ideas, including Christian sentiments, allusions to classical Chinese writings, and calls for the end of the Bandits (The Communist Party).

An example of her melting pot of thinking is the topic of suicide, her ideals of the "Chinese code of honor" that is typified by a Confucian scholar who dies before he accepts dishonor clashes with her Christianity. In her writing "Father's blood" (his death a suicide) Lin Zhao tries to deal with that dissonance within her heart. She asserted that his suicide was not an act of futility but one of resistance, refusing to bend to the communist state.

She writes as recounted in blood letters "Blood! Blood! As a Christian I wish to plead with all the Christian churches and the Holy Sea in Rome: judge the multitude of suicides in mainland China with fairness! ... Do not view all the suicides of the victims of Communist ... rule as spiritual evil! God's gift of life should have been in itself beautiful! therefore it is sin to lightly dispose of it! ... But it is precisely in order to protect the beauty, dignity, freedom, and purity of life that multitudes of victims in China have forsaken their precious lives in resolute protest against the defilement and trampling of life ... I imagine that the Heavenly Father will not necessarily pronounce their suicides sinful but will instead pardon the afflicted souls with compassion! Therefore, righteous and holy churches, please hold a memorial service or a holy Mass for the repose of the soul, for those who died under the tyrannical rule in mainland China."

Lin Zhao contracted these suicides with the Buddhist monks whose temples were forced to draw up 'patriotic covenants' refusing to chant sutras to expiate the sins of counterrevolutionaries who had died.

Lin Zhao seems to have known and exploited the tools of the authoritarianism as a means of preserving her message, in 1962 for example, she insisted on handing in her writings before being released on medical parole. She knew that they would be filed as evidence against her, but that if she kept them on hand, her friends and family had already destroyed as much of her writings as they could to protect themselves. Lin Zhao attempted to inverted the state media from a bastion of lies to the preserver of truth by giving letters to be mailed to them to the prison authorities, these were then preserved as evidence against her, ironically protecting her message. Lin Zhao seems to have anticipated this, she stamped her pages in with her signature in blood as a mark of authenticity. Jie Li makes the argument that Lin Zhao was writing in anticipation of the future that Lin Zhao was writing not just to "Party Newspapers and its readers, Mao Zedong and the CCP, prison wardens and court judges, family and friends, God and Heaven, the dead and those yet to be born". Lin Zhao was also conscious of her choice to write in blood, the cult of CCP martyrs was still popular in these days, indeed Lin Zhao knew a lot about it, having composed a poem in the style of one before, Lin Zhao wrote "Is this not blood".

"Is this not blood? Insidiously exploiting our innocence, childishness, righteousness; exploiting our good and simple hearts, inflaming and harnessing our impassioned spirit. When we became more mature, felt alarmed at the absurdity and cruelty of reality, and began demanding our democratic rights, we came to suffer unprecedented persecution, abuse, and repression. Isn't this blood? Our youth, love, friendship, studies, careers, ambitions, ideals, happiness, freedom ... all that we live for, all that a human being has, were almost completely destroyed and buried by the foul, evil, and hypocritical rule of this totalitarian system. Is this not blood? This evil regime, which has stained the history of this nation as well as of human civilization, was established, strengthened, and sustained by blood."

Lin was a convert to Christianity, having attended a Christian missionary school. As she languished in prison, she became more committed to her faith. Lin Zhao had decided to take on the role of a martyr and a public witness to her faith. This can be seen in "Roses devoted to the Prosecutor":

Inject this drop of blood into my mother country's blood stream

This drop sacrificed my beloved freedom

Wipe it! Rub it! Clean it!

This is blood!

The blood of a Martyr

Who can wipe it away?

将这一滴注入祖国的血液里，

将这一滴向挚爱的自由献祭。

揩吧!擦吧!洗吧!

这是血呢!

殉难者的血迹，

谁能抹得去?

Lin Zhao is in her title and words, asking the state's prosecutor to inject her blood into the blood stream of the nation, but it seems that her blood the blood of a true martyr can not be cleaned easily, figuratively her martyrdom can not be dismissed, it has some greater meaning that the blood guilt can not be removed without correction. This is a theme that was not new to Lin Zhao, the tradition of revolutionary martyrs aside, Lin Zhao when she had been named a rightist had attempted suicide by swallowing matchstick heads. Her suicide letter read in part "May my shadow forever follow those who have tortured and trampled upon me. Let them be forever trained with my blood. This is my curse and my revenged" In "Hungry Slaves" Lin Zhao writes "When the tide of blood rises on a vengeful earth On which branches will the flocks of ravens perch?" Giving a sense that the vengeance of those who bleed would be enough to drown their tormenters. The decision to write in blood, even when ink was sometimes available, or to stamp her ink writings with her signature in blood, was a way to offer her blood to infuse her writings with the proof of her suffering to stand as evidence against her abusers, and stand as a mark against those who had tainted themselves with her blood.

== Rehabilitation and status in China ==
By December 1980, Lin Zhao had been declared not guilty by reason of insanity, and things had calmed down enough that her former classmates and teachers at Peking University felt they could hold a memorial service for her though the cause of her death was not correctly identified, "our classmate Lin Zhao was killed by the counterrevolutionary organization of Lin Biao and Jiang Qing."

In 1981, under the government of Deng Xiaoping, Lin was officially exonerated of her crimes and rehabilitated.

The People's Daily on 27 January 1981, had this to say:

"Among our friends ... was a brave and innocent woman of the South named Lin Zhao. Because she was unwilling to submit to the once popular modern superstition, she had been imprisoned in Shanghai. However, she continued with diary and blood writing to express her belief in truth. ... We do not know the details of her martyrdom—only that on May 1, 1968, a few representatives from “concerned departments” visited her elderly mother, told her that Lin Zhao had been executed on April 29, and that because “the counterrevolutionary” had consumed a bullet, her family had to pay five cents."

Despite her rehabilitation, the Chinese government remains reluctant to allow commemoration or discussion of Lin's life and writings. In 2013, on the 45th anniversary of Lin's execution, a number of activists attempted to visit Lin's grave near her hometown of Suzhou but were restricted by government security officials.

In March 1982 Lin Zhao's sister, Peng Lingfan, was given a few notebooks of her prison writings, a small fraction of the total amount. These were taken to the US and stored in the Hoover Institute.

== Historiography ==
Many of her essays, letters, and diaries were preserved by CCP officials for possible future use against her. Some time after her death, a police official agreed to risk his own life in order to smuggle many of Lin's writings to her friends and family.

In 1981, one of China's state run new agencies, Xinhua, reported on the wrongful execution after their rehabilitation. "This is an amazing story that makes one's hair stand on end"

Wuhan-based writer Fang Fang (famous for her Wuhan Diaries) was one of the first to publish about Lin Zhao in 1998. While working as the editor-in-chair of the Elite Today magazine. Publishing articles about Lin written by her former classmates. The magazine was suspended 3 years later while publishing articles about the Cultural Revolution.

Among the first to rediscover the life of Lin Zhao was Ding Zilin. When her son was killed in the Tiananmen Square Massacre both Ding and Lin had attended Laura Haygood Memorial Schools for Girls in Suzhou. Ding Zilin has been the leader of the Tiananmen Mothers since 1995.

The story of Lin Zhao's life was obscure and little-known until it was brought to light by documentary filmmaker Hu Jie, whose 2005 documentary In Search Of Lin Zhao's Soul won numerous awards. Hu Jie was able to acquire some of these writings for use in his documentary. Currently, a collection of her works is being held at the Hoover Institution at Stanford University.

She is also briefly featured in several chapters of Philip Pan's 2008 book, Out of Mao's Shadow.

In 2015 Shao Jiang published the book, Citizen Publican In China before the internet, which prominently features Lin Zhao, and the Lanzhou University Rightist Counter-Revolutionary Clique.

In 2018, Xi Lian, a professor of world Christianity at Duke University, published a biography of Lin Zhao based upon interviews with friends and family, surviving testimonials and letters from Lin.

Five-Cent Life, an English-language biopic based on Lin Zhao's life, was released in 2020.

== Lin's legacy of dissent ==
Lin Zhao has enjoyed popular acclaim in the Chinese Dissident community.

Mainland dissidents have braved arrest to pay their respects at her tomb, in Lingyan shan (mountain) cemetery Suzhou.

Chinese activist Zhu Chengzi was arrested while attempting to lay flowers on the 50th anniversary of her execution. Zhu was a close friend of Li Wangyang (the longest imprisoned Pro-Democracy activist of 1989). Zhu had been one of the first to who insisted Li Wangyang did not commit suicide, and was arrested or "inciting subversion of state power" for implying the recently released Li was murdered by authorities after releasing an interview.

Ding Zilin credited Lin Zhao's story with giving her the courage to live on, despite numerous suicide attempts herself.

The late Nobel Prize laureate Liu Xiaobo, called her "the only voice of freedom left for contemporary China".

Cui Weiping said of Lin Zhao "Because of you, we have our genealogy".

Yan Zhengxue, has cast a large bronze statue of Lin Zhao, and Zhang Zhixin's heads.

ChinaAid presents the "Lin Zhao Freedom Award" annually in her honor, for non-violent dissidents who have suffered at the hands of the Chinese government.

Wuhan-based hardcore punk band SMZB, "China's most outspoken punks", have written a song called "The Song of the Seagull" based on her poem.

Ran Yunfei said of her "she is the spiritual resource for all Chinese people and the legacy for the whole world."

Fang Fang writes "Some people may say it's not a good time to talk about Lin Zhao, but should we just stop talking about her? We still have to, until everybody remembers this name and knows what she died for".
