= Qiandama =

Chinese butcher and grocery store chain

Guangzhou Qiandama Agricultural Products Company Limited
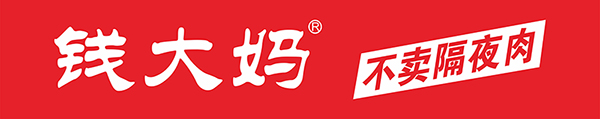
- Native name: 广州市钱大妈农产品有限公司
- Founded: 2012 in Dongguan (first shop); May 16, 2014; 11 years ago in Guangzhou (incorporation)
- Founder: Feng Jisheng
- Headquarters: Guangzhou, Guangdong
- Key people: Feng Jisheng (chairman); Feng Weihua (general manager)
- Website: qdama.com

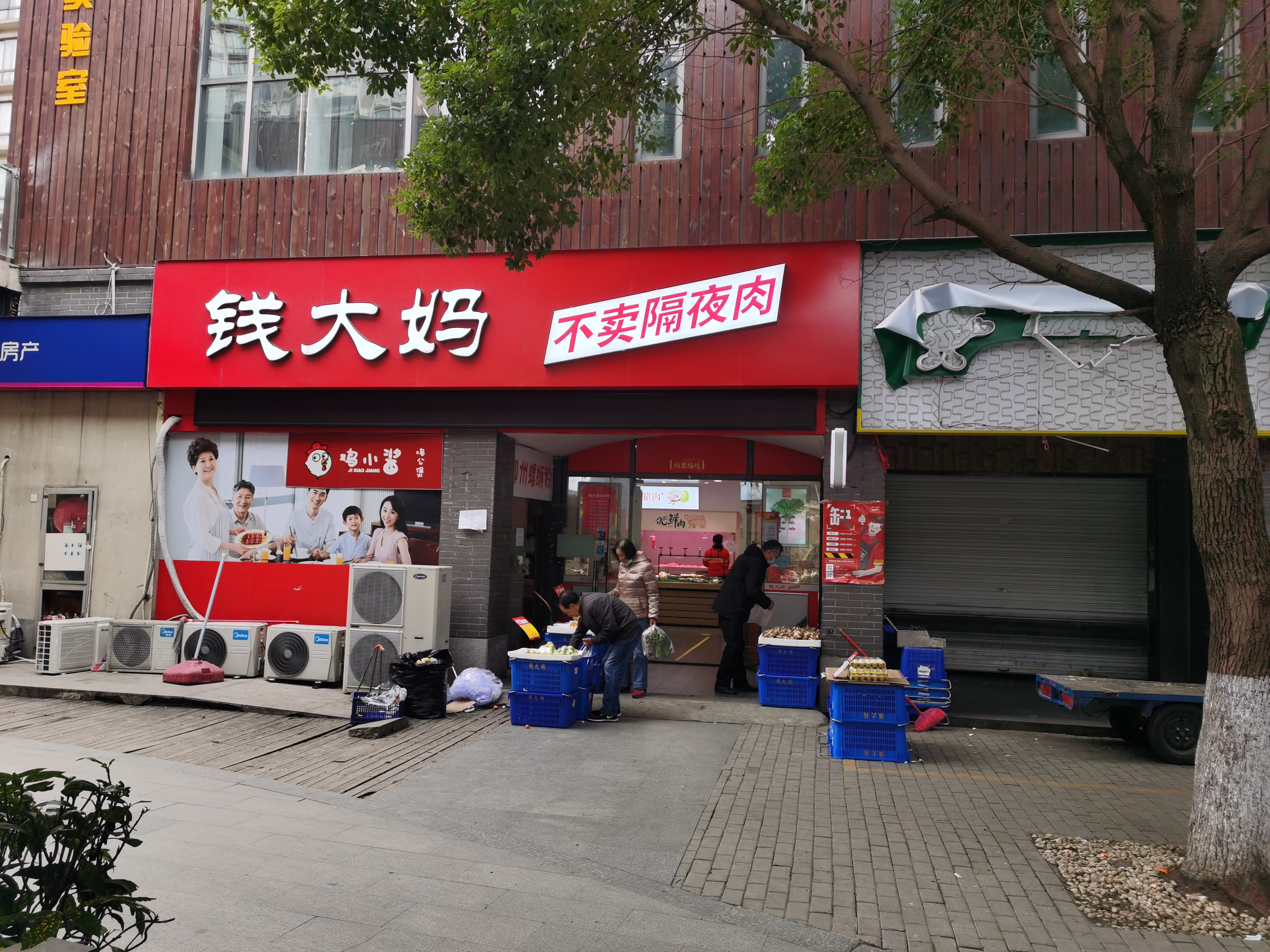
A Qiandama location in Suzhou Industrial Park

Guangzhou Qiandama Agricultural Products Company Limited (Chinese: 广州市钱大妈农产品有限公司), commonly known as Qiandama (Chinese: 钱大妈; lit. 'Auntie (dama) Qian'), is a Chinese chain of butcher and grocery stores. It is known for its slogan "never sells overnight meat" (Chinese: 不卖隔夜肉). Feng Jisheng opened the first Qiandama location in Chang'an, Dongguan, in 2012. As of October 2021, Qiandama operates more than 3,700 locations in China, including 1,500 in Guangdong province.

== Business model ==
Qiandama maintains a "daily clearance" policy of not keeping inventory overnight. Its locations start discounting the price of fresh meat and produce from 7 pm every night, increasing the percentage discount every 30 minutes until giving away any remaining products after 11:30 pm. According to Feng Weihua, general manager of Qiandama, the company's daily clearance policy extends to its supply chain, with products not staying in the supply chain for more than one day. Fresh food is shipped to retail locations before 5:30 am every morning. The process of shelving products and chopping pigs during early morning hours creates noise. Because many Qiandama locations are located in dense residential areas, the noise created has led to complaints by nearby residents. In May 2021, one Qiandama location in Shanghai had wastewater poured onto its shop front.

Initially, Qiandama expanded in Guangdong and the Pearl River Delta via company-operated stores; however, when it reached thirty locations in 2015, it started expanding quickly by adopting a franchising model for some new locations. As of July 2021, more than 90% of Qiandama locations are operated by franchisees. The company's franchising model has come under criticism in China; as reported by China Central Television (CCTV), many franchisees have suffered heavy losses, with CCTV suggesting that Qiandama's daily clearance policy encourages shoppers to wait for discounts every night, leading to a vicious circle of declining average selling price and increasing losses.

The company charges a franchise fee of CN¥30,000, collateral of CN¥40,000, and a renovation fee ranging between CN¥236,800 and CN¥328,800 depending on floor area. When other fees are included, opening a new Qiandama location requires an initial investment of around CN¥500,000 on average. As reported by Southern Weekly, many franchisees have criticized these fees as excessive. Qiandama sets requirements on the minimum quantity and variety of inventory each franchisee must purchase, which sometimes exceed the amount of product a shop can sell. Some franchisees have criticized Qiandama for biased treatment towards franchisees who have good guanxi with the corporation and for lacking a complaints mechanism for franchisees.

Qiandama launched its "vegetable bar" format of unstaffed locations in Shenzhen and Guangzhou in 2021, targeting gated microdistricts which are underserved by traditional fresh food retailers. Fresh vegetables, fruit, meat, seafood and dairy are stored in five to eight specially designed refrigerators allowing customers to pay using WeChat or Alipay.

In January 2022, Qiandama's Beijing subsidiary was placed on the List of Enterprises with Abnormal Operations by the Dongcheng District Administration for Market Regulation; of the twelve Qiandama locations in Beijing, nine had closed by December 2021, with one location having operated for only four months. The company claimed that it "underestimated the difficulty of the Beijing market", including the high cost of rent. An analysis by Zaker cited several reasons for Qiandama's struggles with expanding beyond Guangdong. One reason was lifestyle differences between Guangdong province (where the majority of Qiandama shops are located) and northern China; in winter, people in northern China tend to buy several days of groceries at once, which makes "never sells overnight meat" unattractive as a selling point. Another reason was supply chain difficulties, with Qiandama lacking the advantage of an integrated supply chain beyond southern China. Another challenge faced by Qiandama was competition from e-commerce; online sales of fresh food grew 64% between 2019 and 2020 in China. An am730 editorial suggested that the main reason for Qiandama's difficulties was its over-rapid pace of expansion, extending the break-even time for franchisees.

== Corporate affairs ==
Guangzhou Qiandama Agricultural Products Company Limited, the owner of the Qiandama chain, was incorporated in 2014 by Feng Jisheng and his sister Feng Weihua. Feng Weihua serves as general manager and Feng Jisheng as board chairman. The company completed its Series D funding round in December 2019, raising nearly 1 billion yuan. GenBridge Capital, a private equity firm led by JD.com, is the second-largest shareholder of Qiandama. It planned an initial public offering on the Hong Kong Stock Exchange in 2021, engaging China International Capital Corporation and Morgan Stanley as underwriters.
