= Beijing Women's Federation =

- 北京市妇女联合会
- Abbreviation: BWF
- Formation: November 1949
- Type: Non-profit organization
- Headquarters: Building 7, No. 56 Yard, East Canal Street, Tongzhou District, Beijing
- President: Zhang Yajun
- Parent organization: All-China Women's Federation

The Beijing Women's Federation (BWF; Chinese: 北京市妇女联合会; pinyin: Běijīng shì fùnǚ liánhé huì) is a mass organization for women in Beijing, China. Established in November 1949, it is a local branch of the All-China Women's Federation. Composed of 19 women's groups in Beijing, the Preparatory Committee for the Beiping Democratic Women's Federation (Chinese: 北平市民主妇女联合会筹备委员会) was created in February 1949. Zhang Xiaomei (Chinese: 张晓梅) was the chair of the committee. In November 1949, the First Beijing Women's Congress (Chinese: 北京市第一次妇女代表大会) took place and the federation was founded on 26 November. It was renamed to Beijing Women's Federation in 1957.
