= FHProductionHK =

Hong Kong YouTube channel

FHProductionHK 熊仔頭
- Logo
- Born: Darren Cheng; Kenrick Ho

YouTube information
- Channels: FHProductionHK; FHMediaGame
- Years active: 2012–present
- Genre: Comedy
- Subscribers: 775 thousand (FHProductionHK); 169 thousand (FHFamilyHK)
- Views: 188 million (FHProductionHK); 1.3 million (FHFamilyHK)
- Last updated: 26 March 2025

FHProductionHK
- Traditional Chinese: 熊仔頭
- Simplified Chinese: 熊仔头
Transcriptions
Standard Mandarin
- Hanyu Pinyin: Xióng Zǎi Tóu
Yue: Cantonese
- Jyutping: Hong^{4} Zai^{2} Tau^{4}

FHProductionHK is a Hong Kong YouTube channel. Started in 2012, the channel produces comedic videos that focus on social issues in Hong Kong.

It was created by Darren Cheng and Kenrick Ho who wear bear masks to hide their faces from the audience. Cheng wears a Teddy Head mask (Chinese: 熊仔頭) from the Japanese fictional bear Rilakkuma, while Ho wears a Stitch or Blue Head mask (Chinese: 藍仔頭). FHProductionHK has a large following among people in the post-90s generation. The channel's videos are inspired by Stephen Chow and Hollywood films.

FHProductionHK makes money by receiving YouTube advertisement revenue and producing sponsored videos. FHProductionHK's videos have repeatedly been ranked in YouTube's yearly "Hong Kong Top Ten Trending Original Videos", including in 2014 when its video "My Days As a Student in Hong Kong (Part 1)" (Chinese: 我在香港讀書的日子 (上集)) ranked first.

== History ==
FHProductionHK is a YouTube channel created on 19 January 2012 by Hongkongers Darren Cheng and Kenrick Ho, who had been acquaintances for over a decade. They chose to include "Production" in the name since they thought it sounded powerful. The pair always wear masks to hide their appearances. Cheng assumes the role of Teddy Head (Chinese: 熊仔頭) while Ho assumes the role of Stitch (Chinese: 史迪仔) or Blue Head (Chinese: 藍仔頭). Cheng puts on a Rilakkuma mask from a Japanese fictional bear. They do this owing to Ho's shyness and disinclination to show his face on camera, as well as Cheng's desire to match Ho. Cheng said he does not want viewers to believe he is trying to become famous. FHProductionHK used to have an office at the iPlace industrial building in Kwai Chung.

By 2013, the duo had produced 18 comedy videos focused on adolescent life and had achieved a large following from people in the post-90s generation. To film their videos, they used a digital camera affixed with adhesive tape to a piano stand as their tripod. Cheng and Ho relied on an online forum to conjure topics for their videos that appealed to their audience. Cheng, who had been a science student at the City University of Hong Kong, frequently included science topics in his skits. He routinely used a stream of convoluted statements to go into detail about straightforward scientific concepts. Cheng's short videos are inspired by the Hong Kong actor Stephen Chow and the longer ones by Hollywood films. Ho made vlogs about how Hong Kong people had wages in the tens of thousands and explored whether they needed to find part-time jobs. Additional vlogs he made were about delivering takeout, collecting cardboard, and aggressively buying crunchy chicken wings to eat after making HK$80 (US$10.3). Their most viewed video by 2013 had received nearly 700,000 views and was titled "Boys Have a Say 2", a satirical video of an adolescent boy complaining about his annoying girlfriend. In 2014, they started talks with an artist management company with the aim of entering the entertainment industry. The talks did not go smoothly, so they did not ink an agreement with the company. Instead, they established a company to self-manage their channel.

The South China Morning Post said in 2013 that FHProductionHK "takes on current issues and social phenomena by delivering a hilarious minutes-long speech". According to HK01, FHProductionHK "has a humorous style and down-to-earth material". The Oriental Daily News said the channel's videos were "hilarious and mo lei tau" and "down-to-earth pieces that reflected the aspirations of young people". East Week found in 2015 that "the cartoon headpieces give people a deep and special impression" and FHProductionHK "is highly sought after by netizens because of its thought-provoking sharing of sentiments". The Hong Kong Economic Times in 2015 cited the channel's comedic video "My Days As a Student in Hong Kong" (Chinese: 我在香港讀書的日子為題) as providing a great answer to a relative's question to a student, "You're studying that branch of study. How will you make money in the future?"

In 2016, the channel had a four-figure advertising revenue from YouTube, which Ho said was challenging for them to make a living on. As Hong Kong has a small number of residents compared to other areas and as the channel makes Cantonese videos, it has fewer viewers and thus revenue compared to foreign channels and channels that made videos in English. In 2019, the channel had over 500,000 subscribers and its videos routinely had hundreds of thousands of views with some videos reaching two million views. By 2019, compared to its earlier years, the channel's YouTube videos had a significant decrease in views down to a few hundred thousand. It previously made one video per month but in 2018 had released only seven or eight.

On 18 June 2019, Teddy Head made a video titled "The Use of Two Million and One People" (Chinese: 二百萬零一人的用處) that he posted on YouTube and Facebook reminding Hongkongers to register to vote in time for the 2019 District Council elections. The title referred to the number of people that demonstrators said had attended the 16 June 2019 protest against the 2019 Hong Kong extradition bill. In the last minute of his video, he played a song from Hinry Lau as background music and the Hong Kong Economic Times said the video "seemed to mourn the 15 June death of a protester at the Pacific Place". On 8 September 2019, Cheng and Ho formed a team called "Chicken Wings Two Bears" (Chinese: 雞翼雙熊) to take part in Hong Kong Wing Day, which with 579 participants, broke the Guinness World Records for the "most people grilling/barbecuing simultaneously". At the event, they participated in a competition to roast the most delicious chicken wings for which they received a popularity award. At the D2 Place shopping mall at the Lunar New Year Festival in 2021, FHProductionHK set up a stall where it sold Teddy Head and Stitch eye covers.

== Members ==
- Darren Cheng (born 1991 or 1992) plays the role of Teddy Head (Chinese: 熊仔頭) and is a co-founder of FHProductionHK. Around the beginning of 2015, he dropped out of City University of Hong Kong in the final year before he would have received his bachelor degree to focus on making videos full-time for FHProductionHK. His family and friends largely advised him not to drop out since they thought that if his chosen path did not go well, he could have still fallen back on his university degree. In his first involvement in a movie, Cheng did dubbing work for the animated film The Queen's Corgi. Cheng has a speech habit of mispronouncing his words which FHProductionHK viewers could have thought was caused by the headgear he wore muffling the sound. During his dubbing work for The Queen's Corgi, he had to redo scenes dozens of times owing to mispronunciations.
- Kenrich Ho plays the role of Stitch (Chinese: 史迪仔) or Blue Head (Chinese: 藍仔頭) and is a co-founder of FHProductionHK. Around 2016, he graduated from university.
- To Siu Kiu (Chinese: 杜小喬; born 1990) began acting in FHProductionHK skits in 2013. Cheng has known To Siu-kiu since around 2009. She routinely plays the Kong girl role in the skits. She plays the role of Guanyin, who recruits soldiers, which led to viewers' giving her the nickname "Little Kiu Lady" (Chinese: 小喬娘娘). After she starred in the skits "My Days of Being a Soldier in Hong Kong (Part 1, Part 2)" (Chinese: 我在香港當兵的日子 (上、下集)) and "Men Have Something to Say" (Chinese: 男人有話兒), she became a hit. She entered the entertainment industry, performing in movies and television shows as well as in ads for PlayStation and Hong Kong Airlines. Cheng appeared in RTHK, Now TV, and HKTV shows and hosted the ViuTV travel show Outside In (Chinese: 堅離地).
- Me Chan (Chinese: 阿Me) has starred in FHProductionHK videos and is a makeup artist for the channel. She appeared in the skits "The Day of Confessing Love in Hong Kong" (Chinese: 香港表白的日子), "The Diary of a Despicable Man Who Is Out of Love" (Chinese: 賤男的失戀日記), and "Women Have Something to Say 2" (Chinese: 女人有話兒2). Weekend Weekly said that she gives off the girl next door vibe through her "adorable appearance, sunshine smile, sweetness, and approachable personality".
- Krysella Wong (Chinese: 黃凱儀), known as 波波, performs in FHProductionHK skits.
- Bie Lam (Chinese: 林映蔚; born in 1992 or 1993), known as 阿Bie, is a model and host. She performed in the FHProductionHK skits "Hong Kong Children's Role Models" (Chinese: 香港小孩的偶像), "My Days of Being Attacked Online" (Chinese: 我在網上中伏的日子), and "If I Became a Woman" (Chinese: 假如我變成女人). She attended university where she received a degree in journalism and communication. During her university studies, she did freelance film shoots. Her first full-time job after graduation was as a real estate agent which she did until mid-2019 before resigning to pursue becoming an actress. Lam played a female student in the TVB series The Man Who Kills Troubles (Chinese: 解決師) starring Vincent Wong and Natalie Tong. It was Lam's debut appearance in a TV series which she landed after the casting team had sought new faces.
- Kaying Wong (Chinese: 王嘉盈; born in 1997 or 1998) is an actress for FHProductionHK. She joined the channel in 2019.

== Short films and videos ==
In 2014, FHProductionHK made a short skit with the actress Yuen Qiu in which she played a landlady. Around 2014, co-founders Cheng and Ho invested between HK$10,000 and HK$20,000 (US$1,287 and US$2,574) into making the romance film One Day (Chinese: 一天). It is a film with romantic vignettes filled with both joy and sorrow and is founded on collective memory. One Day took four months to film. The film is influenced by the Stephen Chow film A Chinese Odyssey and used ideas from numerous foreign works. An Apple Daily review said that "as short film, it is already very smooth" but that the film could be improved through having a more realistic campus. It noted that the classrooms were too empty and could have had more students and a fuller set.

In 2019, Cheng invested HK$100,000 (US$12,870.01) into making the short film My Small Ghost Soldier (Chinese: 我的小鬼兵). He has not sought outside funding for his short films. To Siu Kiu stars as an exorcist and Cheng as a ghost in the comedic and romantic film where the two fall in love. The film is slightly over 30 minutes long. In the film, there is a 30-second long segment where To is chained and has her chest grabbed by the ghost whose hands belong to an actress. FHProductionHK released a video titled "Poor Person's Entire Life" (Chinese: 窮人的一生) around 2019 where the protagonist is at a loss for what to do, and his mom tells him to do well in school. The film raises questions about whether being able to immigrate is the motivation for studying well and making good money.

== YouTube rankings ==
In 2014, five of the channel's videos were ranked on the "YouTube Hong Kong 2014 Top Ten Trending Original Videos" list. "My Days As a Student in Hong Kong (Part 1)" (Chinese: 我在香港讀書的日子 (上集)), "Women Have Something to Say" (Chinese: 女人有話兒), "My Days As a Student in Hong Kong (Part 2)" (Chinese: 我在香港讀書的日子 (下集)), "Teddy Head Big Prank" (Chinese: 熊仔頭大整蠱), and "I am From YouTube" (Chinese: 我來自YouTube) ranked first, third, sixth, seventh, and ninth, respectively. Two of FHProductionHK's videos ranked on the 2015 list: "The days that I chase after girls in Hong Kong" (Chinese: 我在香港追女的日子), which ranked second, and "Modern Hong Kong story" (Chinese: 現代香港故事), which ranked tenth.

In 2016, the channel's video "My Breaking Up Story in Hong Kong－First Volume" (Chinese: 我在香港分手的日子－上集) was ranked first in the "YouTube Hong Kong 2016 Top Ten Trending Original Videos" list. Having accrued 800,000 views, the video analysed how men and women interact with each other and depicted the various sad feelings Hong Kong men had when they experienced a breakup. Two of its other videos were included in the list, namely "My Days of Saving Money in Hong Kong" (Chinese: 我在香港慳錢的日子), which ranked second, and "Single for 20 Years: You Ask, I Answer" (Chinese: 毒左廿年，你問我答), which ranked fifth. The channel uploaded a video titled "My Days of Retiring in Hong Kong" (Chinese: 我在香港退役的日子) that ranked second on the list in 2017 and had over a million views. It instructed men about the actions they should take when they liked a woman. In 2018, three of the channel's videos were included in the same YouTube top ten list: the 10-minute video "Fate" (Chinese: 緣份), which ranked third, the roughly 30-minute video "My Small Ghost Soldier" (Chinese: 我的小鬼兵), which ranked fourth, and the 10-minute comedic video that touches on destiny titled "Giving up on someone" (Chinese: 放棄一個人), which ranked fifth. FHProductionHK's video "Dama's Logic" (Chinese: 大媽的道理), which ranked eighth on the list in 2019, mocked how strained relationships are between Chinese Damas and Hong Kong inhabitants. The locals in the video bemoaned that the Damas were a nuisance after the Damas played noisy music while they singing and dancing in the road. The video further touches upon the conflicts between Hongkongers and the Hong Kong Police Force during the 2019–20 Hong Kong protests.

== Sponsored videos ==
FHProductionHK received requests from brands to make sponsored videos. The videos are posted on YouTube and Facebook. Cheng said that although viewers would rather they not make such videos, they believed viewers would be placated as long as the videos were done well. He said that advertisers paid the channel to do a hard sell of the products and that he had no choice as he needed to make a living. The advertisement videos received criticism from some netizens, but the three advertisements they had made by early 2015 had a negligibly smaller number of views compared to their other videos. The three advertisement videos were "Women Have Something to Say" (Chinese: 女人有話兒), "Time Is Unable to Be Seized" (Chinese: 捉不緊的歲月), and "I am From YouTube" (Chinese: 我來自YouTube). FHProductionHK made an advertisement for McDonald's called "Super Chef Competition" (Chinese: 超級食神大賽). The channel's primary way to make money is through creating advertisements. Typically half of its advertisement production revenue goes to costs. Over half of the costs is allocated to filming and post-production which is more than what they spend on the rent for an office. Beginning in 2017, The Hongkong and Shanghai Banking Corporation (HSBC) collaborated with FHProductionHK to make suicide prevention videos after several students had killed themselves in the preceding school year.
