= Zhang Chunyuan =

Chinese dissident executed during the Cultural Revolution

- 張春元
- Born: 1932
- Died: March 1970 (aged 37–38)
- Cause of death: Execution by firing squad
- Occupation: Student

Zhang Chunyuan (張春元, 1932 – March 1970) was a student of history at Lanzhou University where he was labeled as a rightist during the Hundred Flowers Campaign and subsequent Anti-Rightist Campaign. He was sent for Reform through Labor during the Great Leap Forward. He was a first hand witness to mass deaths and starvation, and even cannibalism that was common in Gansu. He is one of the main subjects of Hu Jie's documentary Spark.

== Early life ==
Zhang was known to have served in the People's Liberation Army during the Korean War, where he was wounded in the leg. He left the army and started attending School at Lanzhou University, where he was labeled a Rightist during the Anti-Rightist Campaign of 1957 in his second year at the age of 26.

== The Lanzhou University Rightist Counter-Revolutionary Clique ==
Shocked by the horror of the Great Chinese Famine, Zhang was a founding member and leader of The Lanzhou University Rightist Counter-Revolutionary Clique. The group had started at about 20 members, and grew by the time of their discovery to around 60 members mostly intellectuals, local peasants, and even the local communist party secretary Du Yinghua. Zhang traveled to Shanghai and recruited Lin Zhao, Beijing to buy a mimeograph, Jiangsu, Zhejiang, Guangdong, Hubei and Henan to expand the Clique's network. Lin Zhao and Gu Yan, had effectively set up a branch office in Shanghai with 7 members, using Gu's grandparents house as a second printing lab, Lin Zhao had named this cell the "Coalition of Chinese Free Youths in Combat".

They published an underground magazine, full of articles critical of the policies that were starving people to death around them, called Spark. After publishing the first edition, the group was discovered, captured, and imprisoned, and some of the leaders were eventually executed.

== Arrest, Escape, Execution ==
In May 1960, Zhang's girlfriend, Tan Chanxue, who had been selected by the Clique to appeal for foreign aid, was arrested while attempting to escape to Hong Kong. Zhang tried to free her using forged documents and a fake public security ID, but was captured. While they were able to hold out and not incriminate the Clique's members, the police eventually discovered their identities, and began to trace down the other members in Gansu. At the same time two rightists in Gansu had tipped off the provincial public security bureau.

Zhang escaped, and made his way to Suzhou, likely in hopes that the Shanghai cell were still free, however he learned that they had also been arrested, he went to Shanghai where he circled Lin Zhao's prison twice as a token of respect for her, and was recaptured not long after. In 1970, he was found to be communicating with Du Yinghua and "engaging in counter-revolutionary activities in prison". Du Yinghua and Zhang Chunyuan were executed side by side in 1970 on the shores of Jiaojia Bay.

The members of the Clique were politically rehabilitated in the 1980s under Deng Xiaoping, who ironically, was in charge of the Anti-Rightist Campaign that saw the students down the road to counter-revolutionary activism in the first place.

== See also ==
- Lin Zhao
- Hu Jie
