= Antisemitism in China =

Antisemitism in the People's Republic of China is mostly a 21st-century phenomenon. There is little evidence of antisemitism in China in historical sources. During the Reform and Opening Up period, academics noted that the spread of philosemitism, which depicts Jews as naturally intelligent and financially savvy, gained traction in the popular press. In the 2020s, antisemitic conspiracy theories began to spread and intensify in China. While there is not a large Jewish diaspora in China, much of the antisemitism is claimed by some to come from Chinese nationalists and anti-Israel leftists, as part of a reaction against supposed foreign encirclement and influence, although the link between anti-Israel sentiment and antisemitism is debated. Some Chinese people believe in antisemitic tropes that Jews secretly rule the world.

== History ==
Public consciousness about the presence of Jews in China has a variety of historical influences. Academic Eric Reinders of Emory University states that these include "Protestant missionaries, Jews as a model for Chinese immigrants, Japanese anti-Jewish articles circulated in China in the 1930s, the presence of European Jewish refugees in Shanghai, and the politics around Israel as a proxy of U.S. imperialism. According to Tuvia Gering, some early Chinese reformers such as Liang Qichao, Hu Shih, and Sun Yat-sen mixed racist remarks about Jews with admiration of the Zionist movement. Gering states that antisemitic conspiracy theories have historically been a useful tool for the government of the People's Republic of China against Western countries.

=== Republic of China ===
Stereotypes of Jews were present among intellectuals of the New Culture Movement. According to academic Yuang Marcus Liu, Republican-era intellectuals' privileging of Western ideas made them receptive to antisemitism.

In the 1930s, the Jews of Harbin living under the Manchukuo puppet state of the Empire of Japan were the victims of antisemitism by elements of the Russian Fascist Party. The Japanese tolerated this antisemitic treatment. As a result, many Jews of Harbin fled to Shanghai under the Republic of China.

==== Shanghai Ghetto ====
During the Holocaust, Shanghai was one of the few places in the world that did not need require a visa or travel documents. In 1941, during the Second Sino-Japanese War, Japanese imperial forces began taking control of the areas of Shanghai which they had not previously occupied. In November of that year, Nazi Germany stripped Jews abroad of their citizenship, resulting in Jews abroad becoming stateless refugees. On 8 February 1943, the Japanese occupiers created what they described as the designated area (the Shanghai ghetto) in Hongkew where they re-located and segregated the Jewish refugees whom Nazi Germany had stripped of citizenship. Jews in the Japanese-run ghetto could not leave without a pass and experienced extreme poverty. The Shanghai ghetto lasted until the Japanese surrendered in 1945.

=== People's Republic of China ===
Throughout the 1990s and early 2000s, Chinese stereotypes of Jews were mostly philosemitic, according to academic Yang Meng. Some mass market books have associated Jews with wealth-building.Jews have also been praised for valuing education like Chinese, although this is often also framed competitively. Some scholars have noted that philosemitic stereotypes in China, which gained traction during the Reform and Opening Up period, turned antisemitic when they were no longer considered useful to official narratives.

Hongbing Song, a Chinese-American IT consultant and amateur historian, published the Currency Wars series starting in 2007, believing Jewish financiers controlled the international banking systems since the era of Napoleon. Song also says in his book that the key functions of the Federal Reserve have been ultimately controlled by five private banks, including Citibank, all of which have maintained "close ties" with the Rothschild family, one Jewish group that led to the 1997 Asian financial crisis. The book became a bestseller and even has been read by some high ranking Chinese officials.

According to surveys which were conducted by the Anti-Defamation League in 2014, roughly 20 percent of Chinese people have a negative attitude towards Jews, and the older people are, the more likely they are to have a negative perception of Jews. Since 2015, descendants of the Kaifeng Jews have come under government pressure and suspicion.

During the 2019–2020 Hong Kong protests, state-owned newspaper Ta Kung Pao published antisemitic George Soros conspiracy theories, displaying Soros, a Jew, as a reptile in collusion with Jimmy Lai.

The May 2021 events in Gaza precipitated Chinese state-run media invoking antisemitic tropes and sentiments, encouraged by top Chinese diplomats, and rehashed by well-known Chinese political commentators. In particular, Israel's embassy in Beijing accused China Global Television Network (CGTN) of "blatant antisemitism" when it broadcast a program during the 2021 Israel–Palestine crisis, in which host Zheng Junfeng claimed that Jews were in control of global finances and that "powerful lobbies" of Jews were responsible for the U.S. government's support for Israel.

In September 2021, BYD was criticized for appointing Lu Kewen, an online influencer known for spreading antisemitic tropes, as a spokesperson for the company. Political blogger Sima Nan's Weibo channel spread the notion that Jews colluded with the Empire of Japan to establish a Jewish homeland on Chinese territory during the Second Sino-Japanese War in what has been termed the Fugu Plan, which purported that "Jewish capitalists" are puppeteering Western powers to contain China's rise.

In 2023, articles that interpreted the Fugu Plan as an antisemitic conspiracy theory against China went viral on Chinese social media. Following the discharge of radioactive water of the Fukushima Daiichi Nuclear Power Plant, conspiracy theories spread in China that the Tokyo Electric Power Company was financed by Jewish people.

Antisemitic reactions to the Gaza war were widespread on Chinese state media and social media. Antisemitic comments are not removed from Chinese social media sites such as Xiaohongshu. Sympathetic portrayals of Hamas have proliferated on Bilibili. In a November 2023 interview with Voice of America, Israel's ambassador to China, Irit Ben-Abba, spoke about China–Israel relations and antisemitism on the Chinese Internet, stating that "The antisemitic, anti-Israel discourse that we saw quite intensively in the last month has subsided", and arguing that China's relations with Israel have not changed, as according to Ben-Abba, there is still significant admiration of Israel and Jews. China Central Television (CCTV) falsely claimed that "Jews represent just 3% of the American population but control 70% of its wealth." In response to the 2024 pro-Palestinian protests on university campuses, former editor-in-chief of the Global Times Hu Xijin stated that the protests show that "Jewish political and business alliance's control over American public opinion has declined."

Antisemitic tropes have also been spread online by the Ministry of Public Security's Spamouflage influence operation. In October 2024, The Washington Post reported that Spamouflage targeted U.S. representative Barry Moore (R-AL) with accusations that he won his primary because of "the bloody Jewish consortium," as well as calling him a "Jewish dog", among other antisemitic tropes. Moore has been critical of the Chinese Communist Party, and as a result, he has expressed support for Taiwanese independence. Moore is not Jewish.

In 2025, Xiao Junzheng, China's ambassador to Israel, stated that "[t]here is no fertile ground for antisemitism in China, nor would the Chinese government allow it to exist or develop in the country." This includes an article he published in Israel Hayom, remarks he made during a visit to the Chaim Herzog Museum of the Jewish Soldier in World War II, and a speech he delivered at the 9th Annual Conference on Israel's China Policy.

In February 2026, the Embassy of China in Tel Aviv stated that a report by the Jewish People Policy Institute on antisemitism in China contained "unfounded accusations and malicious smears." The report claimed that antisemitism is on the rise in China, with antisemitic rhetoric shifting from the fringes of cyberspace to official media, academia, and state-sanctioned discourse, and that an "antisemitic wave" emerged following the 2021 and 2023 Gaza conflicts.

== Responses ==
Several Jewish leaders and activists, such as Rabbi Matt Trusch, have used Chinese social media such as Douyin to educate the Chinese populace about antisemitism and debunk common stereotypes and conspiracy theories. Academic Tuvia Gering also called Chinese and Israeli officials to address the growing antisemitic sentiment before it has a chance to spread further. Foreign journalists are questioning how antisemitic tropes has managed to persist for so long under China's strict internet controls.

Academic Yang Meng describes contemporary antisemitism in China as "ideological, narrative-driven, geopolitically functional antisemitism arising without a Christian legacy, without a racial Jewish 'other,' and without a significant local Jewish community." In a 2023 article, Rotem Kowner et al. argue that antisemitism in China aligns with China's alt-right ideology. Analysts have noted that antisemitism in China is a relatively understudied subject, and that viral antisemitic posts on social media does not necessarily indicate the average opinion of Chinese people, as there are also many posts condemning antisemitism.

== See also ==
- China–Israel relations
- History of the Jews in China
- Racism in China
- Religion in China#Judaism
