= Nouveau riche =

Term to describe newly enriched persons

Nouveau riche (French for 'new rich'; French: [nuvo ʁiʃ]), new rich, or new money (in contrast to old money; French: vieux riche [vjø ʁiʃ]) is a social class describing rich individuals whose wealth was acquired within their own lifetime, rather than by familial inheritance. These individuals had previously belonged to a lower social class or economic stratum (rank) within that class, but the acquisition of new money enabled upward social mobility. Nouveau riche have the means for conspicuous consumption, the buying of goods and services that signal membership in an upper class. As a pejorative term, nouveau riche describes the vulgarity and ostentation of the newly rich individual who lacks the worldly experience and value system of old money, or inherited wealth, such as the patriciate, the nobility, the gentry, or elites. However, some who rose from lower social classes see nouveau riche as a compliment rather than an insult, viewing it as recognition that they built their own wealth and status.

== History ==
The idea of nouveau riche dates at least as far back as ancient Greece (c. 8th century BCE). In the 6th century BCE, the poet and aristocrat Theognis of Megara wrote how “in former days, there was a tribe who knew no laws nor manners ... These men are nobles, now, the gentlemen of old are now the trash”. In the Roman Republic, the term novus homo ('new man') carried similar connotations.

== Social status ==
One can define social status in relation to wealth and to the power granted by the wealth. It has been argued that the upper ruling classes have legitimized "... their rule with claims of status and honor and moral superiority". These ruling classes claim that wealth inherited through "blood ... and the concept of proper breeding" is superior. The juxtaposition of the nouveau riche to the old-money social class highlights the cultural, value system and societal differences between the two social groups.

Old family ties, as traditional claims of status, are not found in the nouveaux riches, which challenges and ultimately redefines social traditions and values. As seen through the rise in the number of debutantes, the social value of the debut has since shifted from the "family's elite social standing and long family traditions" to "a symbolic value as an element of upper-class lifestyle". This transition allows for high social standing to be established by the nouveau riche through the institution of the debut.

Social integration of these elite sects is extremely slow and sluggish, which makes it more likely that the nouveaux riches will "retain identification with the traditional ... group of origin; this is the basis for division between the groups." Furthermore, the isolation that minority nouveaux riches experience within their own class leads them "to prioritize issues of radical justice, civil liberties, and religious tolerance over pure economic self-interest".

== Inter-class stereotypes ==
Often referred to as parvenu, members of the nouveau riche are often discriminated against by the old-money parts of society because they "lack the proper pedigree". Their lack of historical prestige has inspired criticism that the nouveau riche are "uncouth" and "uncultured" and their behavior is often satirized by American society by "implying that stereotyped, rather than real, behavior patterns are copied".

Many individuals have made claims that those with new money are inferior to those with old money, such as saying that nouveaux riches "lack political and cultural sophistication" and that the old rich are "more sophisticated than the less cosmopolitan nouveau riche". In 1929, Jerome Napoleon Charles Bonaparte, who himself married into a family that had once been considered parvenu and lacking in pedigree, protested that "the nouveau riche... is making places like Palm Beach no more exclusive than Coney Island. Newport, the last stronghold of the elite, has the moneyed intruder at the gates.... Undesirables are penetrating everywhere".

In 18th-century Europe, old-money families attempted to raise themselves above the nouveaux riches by renovating their ancestral residences, to allude to their antiquity. Their evident ties to the families' history could not be rivaled by the new, self-made class. In the Dutch Republic, the nobility saw this as an advantage over the merchant burghers of Amsterdam, while a similar trend arose in the French court. In Scotland, where lairds reworked buildings like Thirlestane Castle, Glamis Castle and Drumlanrig Castle in the 17th-century, to celebrate the lineage of their families.

== Nouveau pauvre ==
The term nouveau pauvre (French for 'new poor') was coined to refer to an individual who had once owned wealth but has now lost all or most of it. This term generally emphasizes that the individual was previously part of a higher socioeconomic rank, but the wealth that provided the means for the acquisition of goods or luxuries is currently unobtainable. These individuals may or may not actually be poor, but compared to their previous rank, it seems as if they are. Nicholas Monson (grandson of the 9th Baron Monson) and Debra Scott were authors of The Nouveaux Pauvres: A Guide to Downward Nobility (1984), "a lifestyle manual for poverty-stricken aristocrats" "running an aristocratic lifestyle on a tradesman's budget".

== See also ==
- Bourgeoisie
- Economic inequality
- Essex man
- Hübsche families
- Liberal elite
- New Russians
- Parvenu
- Philistine
- Rags to riches
- Snob
- Sudden wealth syndrome
- Tuhao
- White shoe brigade
