= Bullet fee =

Fee charged to family of executed prisoner

A bullet fee is a financial charge levied on the family of executed prisoners. Bullet fees have been levied in the Islamic Republic of Iran, Kingdom of Yugoslavia, as well as in the People's Republic of China, Ethiopia under the Derg's military and civilian regimes, and Nazi Germany on the families of executed prisoners.

== See also ==
- Execution by shooting
- Execution by firing squad
- Lin Zhao
