= Tuhao =

Chinese term referring to people of wealth

Tuhao (Chinese: 土豪; pinyin: tǔháo) is a Chinese term referring to people of wealth. The term has several related and differing definitions throughout time. In its original literary form, it refers to those of prominent and wealthy backgrounds. In modern use, the term has also become a popular slang used to describe the nouveau riche. Pejoratively, the internet slang can be understood to carry on the meaning of "uncouth nouveau riche", "tacky" or "extravagant".

== Origin and transformation in uses ==
The term 'tuhao' was originally used in ancient China, dating back to the Northern and Southern Dynasties around 1,500 years ago. The term originally referred to those of prominent origin, especially people of influential and wealthy backgrounds. During the Republic period and the Cultural Revolution from 1920 to early 1950, it was used to describe and refer to landlords or landholders who bullied those beneath them in the social class, known as the countrymen.

Before August 2013, 'Tuhao' was a popular internet slang used to describe irrational and over-consumed online game players, who were also called "RMB warriors" as they use renminbi to purchase in-game items and suppress regular players who did not have the ability to purchase as many items. They won by their purchasing power, rather than their online game techniques or tactics. Its usage has now extended to daily life. People who purchase a large amount of figures, models and luxury goods are also given the nickname 'Tuhao'.

The word 'Tuhao' has gone viral recently since its first appearance as a joke on the Chinese social platform Weibo in 2013: A young man asks a Buddhist monk, 'I'm wealthy, but unhappy. What should I do?' The Buddhist monk says, "Define 'wealthy.' " The young man answers, 'I have millions in the bank and three apartments in central Beijing. Is that wealthy?' The Buddhist monk silently holds out a hand. The young man says: 'Master, are you telling me that I should be thankful and give back?' Instead of telling him to live a simple and happy life, the Buddhist monk replied 'Tuhao, let's be friends!" The joke implies that the tuhao's wealth was so substantial that it even made a Buddhist monk greedy.

== Sociology and derived terms ==
The word "tuhao" comprises two Chinese characters: one meaning "soil or earth"; the other meaning "grandeur" .

Tuhao jin (土豪金) means "tuhao gold" or "the gold of tuhao".

The phrase, "tuhao jin" was then widely used to make sarcastic remarks at gold-plated luxury cars, the opulent interior of a Chongqing school to, most recently, the golden exterior of the People's Daily office tower in Beijing. On the Chinese social network Weibo, one user mocked the building's golden exterior, exclaiming, "Wow! What a massive 'tuhao jin'..."

The fact is that Chinese has always had derogatory terms for the rich and unsophisticated. "Tu" (the same tu from tuhao) was one. Tuhao is significant not because it is another such term, but because it is a parody of such terms, and the discourse of crass, status-driven consumption which underlies these. "Tuhao" indicates fusions of rustic roots with material ambition and gaudy expressions. However, in taking this to the "nth" degree, the term also evinces a new capacity for Chinese to laugh at themselves. Cultural sociologist Michael Griffiths stated, "for consumers in China's higher-tier cities (who have already been around this kind of crass materialism for a couple of decades now), tuhao represents a tongue-in cheek satire of China's breakneck pursuit of material affluence in the get-rich-quick era. It also heralds a future where face-driven materialism will be less obviously paramount in consumption." Related trends can be seen all over China's consumer economy today, not least in changes to the luxury sector.

== International reputation ==
Oxford English Dictionary is considering adding "Tuhao" into its 2014 edition since this word has become familiar among the international society. Foreign media used "Tuhao" to describe Chinese tourists. In 2013, 70 percent of European luxury goods were purchased by Chinese people, and many paid with cash. Moreover, the BBC has launched a programme depicting the phenomenon of "Tuhao", introducing the origin, meaning and popularity. In 2015, it was also listed as one of the top "hot words" in China Daily and is now widely used to make fun of the rich who love luxurious products. As a result, some people are worried about the negative reputation brought by the word "Tuhao" to China.

In 2014, South Korean drama, 'Hotel King', made an ironic depiction of a rich Chinese man in one of its episodes, triggering a huge controversy among Chinese netizens.

== See also ==
- Tusi
- Tugai
