= Shamate =

Chinese youth subculture

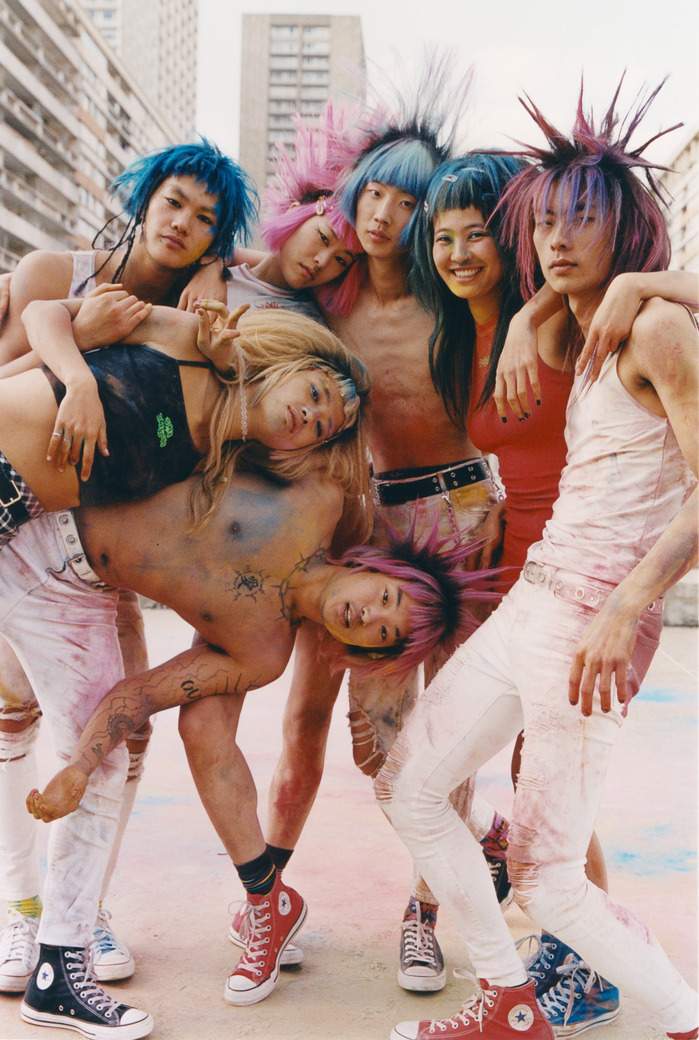
Example of Shamate fashion

Shamate (Note: simplified Chinese: 杀马特; traditional Chinese: 殺馬特; pinyin: Shāmǎtè. Transliteration of the English word smart.) or SMART is a youth subculture and fashion movement originating from migrant workers (mingong) in 2000s South China. It is characterized by eccentric makeup, hairstyles and clothing. At its peak, there were over 200,000 Shamate.

== Fashion and influences ==
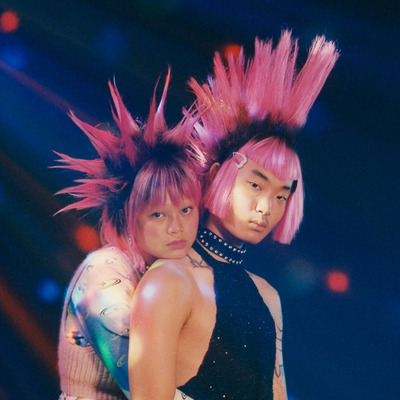
Typical Shamate hairstyles

Shamate is a subculture marked by colorful and eccentric makeup, hairstyles and clothing. Hairstyles are often large, colorful and spiky. It takes inspiration from Visual Kei, Korean fashion, glam rock, goth, and punk.

Le Monde diplomatique describes Shamate men as wearing "eye make-up, studded leathers, slashed jeans and tight T-shirts", and Shamate women as wearing "fishnets or knee-high socks with mini shorts, thick belts and skimpy tops".

== Socioeconomic background ==
Many Shamate are second-generation migrant workers (mingong) in their teens or early twenties from rural towns and villages in China, who dropped out of school at a young age and went to large urban centers to look for jobs, particularly factory jobs in Guangdong.

They are often described as being part of the "left-behind children", because many of their parents abandoned them at an early age to work in factories in urban areas.

== History ==
=== Origins ===
The Shamate subculture was founded in 2006 by then 11-year-old Luo Fuxing. Luo was a "left-behind child", and lived in Meizhou at the time. Luo was inspired by other underground movements, but found them too tame. Inspired by the Visual Kei subculture, Luo uploaded a selfie of himself with his hair dyed red and a sleeveless studded jacket to QQ. He named the new subculture "SMART", which he transliterated into Chinese as Shamate. The term quickly gained traction, creating a subculture that adopted the style.

However, Foreign Policy and Sixth Tone claim the movement was founded in 1999 in Hong Kong by Mai Rox.

== See also ==
- Emo subculture
- Scene (subculture) – Comparable subculture from the West
