= All-China Women's Federation =

Women's organization in China

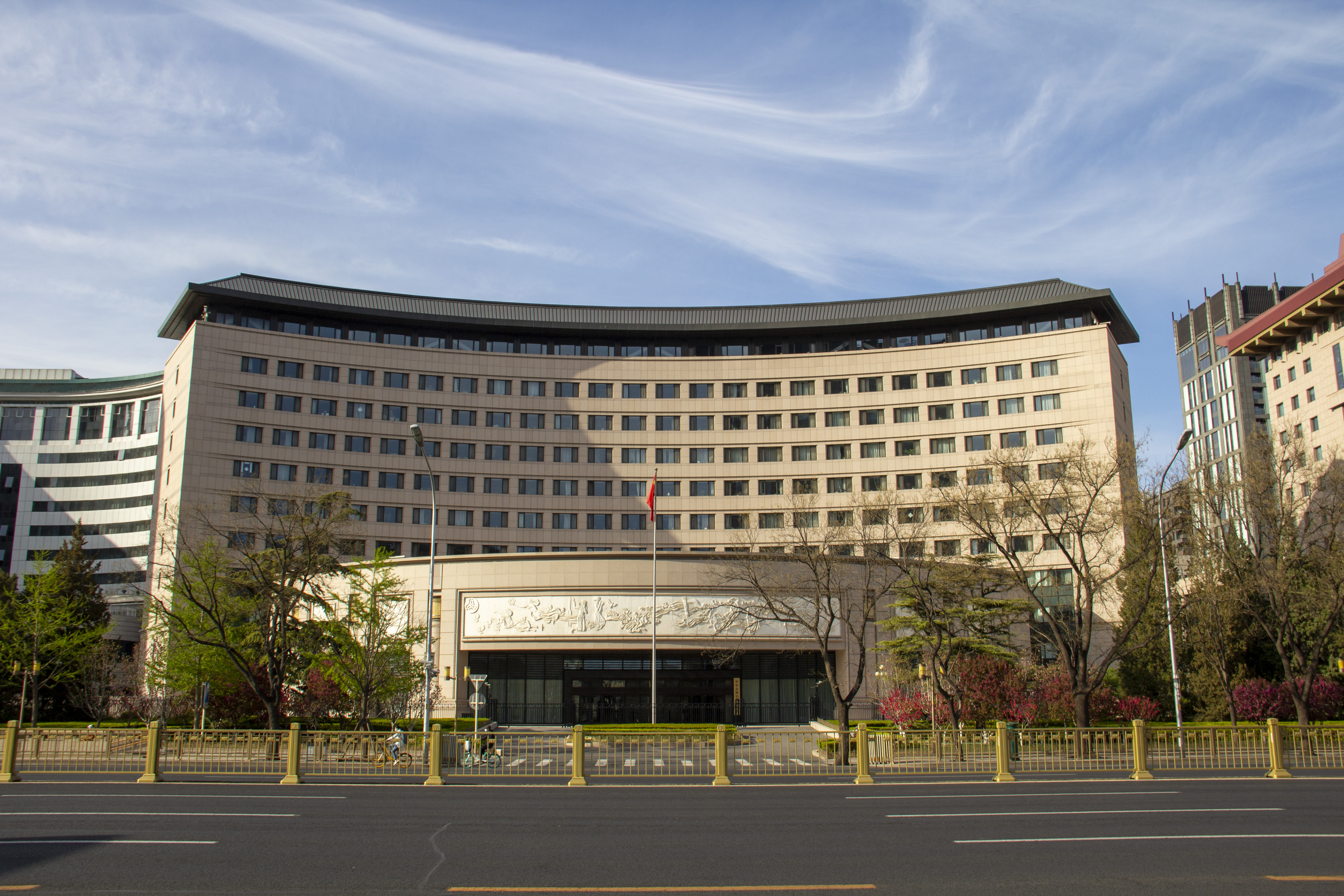
- Headquarters of the ACWF
- Abbreviation: ACWF
- Formation: 24 March 1949
- Type: People's organization
- Purpose: Women's rights
- Headquarters: Beijing, People's Republic of China
- President: Shen Yiqin
- Vice President: Huang Xiaowei, etc
- Main organ: National Congress and Executive Committee
- Affiliations: Communist Women's International (Historical); Women's International Democratic Federation (Historical)
- Website: www.women.org.cn

All-China Women's Federation
- Simplified Chinese: 中华全国妇女联合会
- Traditional Chinese: 中華全國婦女聯合會
Transcriptions
Standard Mandarin
- Hanyu Pinyin: Zhōnghuá Quánguó Fùnǚ Liánhéhuì
- Wade–Giles: Chung-hua Chüan-kuo Fu-nü Lien-ho-hui

The All-China Women's Federation (ACWF) is a people's organization established during the Chinese Civil War on 24 March 1949. It was originally called the All-China Democratic Women's Foundation, and was renamed the All-China Women's Federation in 1957. It has acted as the official leader of the women's movement in the People's Republic of China since its founding in 1949.

== History ==
=== Pre-1949: Women's movement prior to the CCP and predecessors ===
The early women's movement in China focused on eradicating the assumption that women were inferior to men. The early reformers believed that women needed help to improve their own attitudes about themselves, since even the women generally considered themselves to be inferior to men. The Chinese Communist Party (CCP) had shown an early interest in protecting the rights of women. During the 2nd National Congress in 1922, the party issued a statement arguing for the end of Chinese traditions that repress women. They also released a formal letter ensuring equality under the law for both men and women, and guaranteed equal pay for both genders during the 3rd National Congress.

When the CCP entered the First United Front to fight warlords and unite China from 1924 to 1927 with the Kuomintang (KMT), each party established their own women's department during this time. However, the United Front ended with the Shanghai massacre in 1927, where the KMT launched an attack to purge communists and laborers. The ideas about liberating Chinese women from Confucian values were only permitted within the territory under CCP rule. These territories were called soviets, and were the places the CCP fled to following the White Terror because they were not under the control of the KMT. The KMT championed traditional Confucian ideals about women, and they established the New Life Movement, which sought to counter the gender role espoused by the CCP with traditional Confucian gender roles supported by the KMT. The CCP's time in the soviets from 1927 to 1945 also gave them the opportunity to develop the skills for organizing federations and governing, which greatly facilitated the founding of the ACWF later.

The Chinese women's movement gained a new momentum with the Second Sino-Japanese War (1937–1945). Leaders of the women's movement expressed nationalist sentiments in response to the threat the war posed to their daily lives. These leaders called for the liberation of women to defend the nation. The number of official women's organization within the CCP at one of the soviets, Yan'an, grew during the invasion. In March 1938, at the First Women's Congress held by the Women's Federation of Shaan-Gan-Ning (a forerunner to the ACWF) in a different communist-controlled area, the leaders of the women's movement began to form their nationalist ideas into an agenda. The women in attendance stated that the goal of the women's movement should be to unite women and to work together to liberate China. The First Women's Congress also outlined goals for the women's movement such as: helping women escape abusive marriages, improving women's health, eradicating the practice of foot binding, ending domestic abuse, and protecting women's inheritance rights. The ACWF would adopt many of the same goals in 1949.

=== 1949–1966: Founding and early years ===
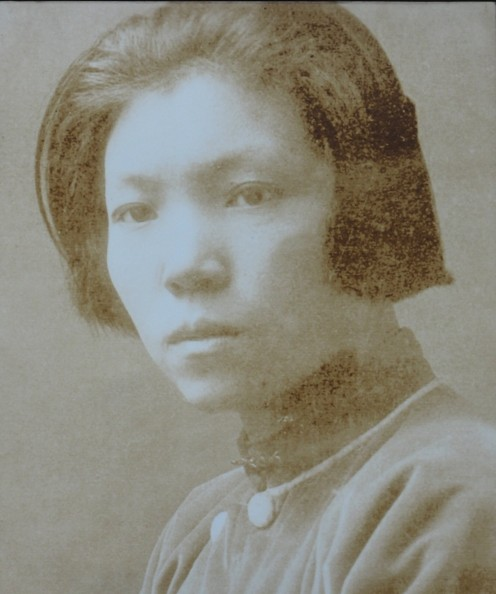
Cai Chang, the first president of the ACWF

The All-China Democratic Women's Federation was established on 24 March 1949 as China's first country-wide women's organization, and would be renamed the All-China Women's Federation on 3 April 1949. Women who had been dominant in the women's movement and the CCP were included in the federation's leadership. Cai Chang, a prominent leader in the women's movement since, an active CCP member, and a veteran of the Long March, was the first chair of the organization. The organization began as a federation of various regional women's groups with the dual goals of building a socialist China and promoting the status of women. The ACWF soon developed beyond its original mission of promoting gender equality, and it became a tool used by the party to mobilize women for economic, political and ideological motives.

The early stages of the organization were characterized by a focus on Marxist–Leninist ideology. Its political tasks focused on identifying and proposing solutions to women's issues, including through academic research. For a significant period following 1949, much of the academic research on women's issues in China was conducted through the ACWF.

During the Land Reform Movement, the ACWF issued a call to Party activists to encourage peasant women to understand their "special bitterness" from a class perspective. Women activists helped peasant women prepare to speak in public, including by roleplaying as landlords to help such women practice.

To emphasize the contribution of women, the Five Good Family Campaign was introduced in 1956 to acknowledge efforts in areas such as education, managing the household, establishing connections with neighbors, keeping the house clean, and self-improvement. Promoting this campaign and ideology was important to the ACWF, and it encouraged local chapters to form women's congresses to spread the message.

Around 1957, the ACWF entered a new phase, dropping "Democratic" from its name, as the federation was formally incorporated in the party structure. It entered the administrative hierarchy of the state, and declared itself a mass organization. Formal inclusion into the state apparatus altered some of the duties of the ACWF. The ACWF was now responsible for spreading political propaganda among women, guaranteeing the inclusion of women in political campaigns, marketing the campaigns to Chinese women, and organizing parades, meetings and demonstrations to encourage female participation in campaigning. The CCP sought to use the ACWF to promote its gender-specific ideas and create a formal channel to mobilize women. The ACWF also established affiliations with other mass movements: The YWCA of China and the Women Personnel Section of the Trade Union.

In the period prior to the Cultural Revolution, the ACWF was among organizations which hosted birth planning exhibitions to educate the public about contraception, abortion, IUDs, and sterilization procedures.

In addition to this, the ACWF played an important role internationally for the CCP. As a communist country in the Cold War, China had difficulty establishing diplomatic connections. ACWF was able to reach out to women's movements abroad, and even hosted 23 delegations from other parts of the world for the Asia Women's Representative Conference in December 1949. This enabled the PRC to go around the diplomatic blockade and forge connections with other countries. However, soon the Cultural Revolution would begin in China, which forced the ACWF to discontinue many of its policies.

=== 1966–1976: The ACWF and the Cultural Revolution ===
The women's movement during the Cultural Revolution (1966–1976), like other movements in this period, came to depend on the cult of Mao Zedong. During the Cultural Revolution, the women's movement was viewed as bourgeois and reactionary since it had originated in the West. The ACWF shut down in 1968 because it was considered anti-revolutionary. The party argued that the women's movement needed to be completely immersed in the revolutionary movement instead of harboring its own agenda. The offices of the ACWF were occupied by the army and many of the female cadres who had been involved with the women's movement were sent to labor camps in the countryside; the movement ceased to function until the arrest of the Gang of Four in 1976.

The committee for the 4th National Women's Congress met in 1976, started rehabilitating many of the female cadres sent to the countryside, and reinstated the ACWF. The ACWF was completely reestablished in 1978 and soon it announced its support for the Four Modernizations, Deng Xiaoping's plan to modernize agriculture, national defense, industry and technology in China. The newly reformed ACWF was able to strengthen its ability to set up local chapters, but, while other federations were able to resume work in the early 1970s, the ACWF did not resume work on a national level until 1978.

=== 1976–1990: Reform and Opening Up ===
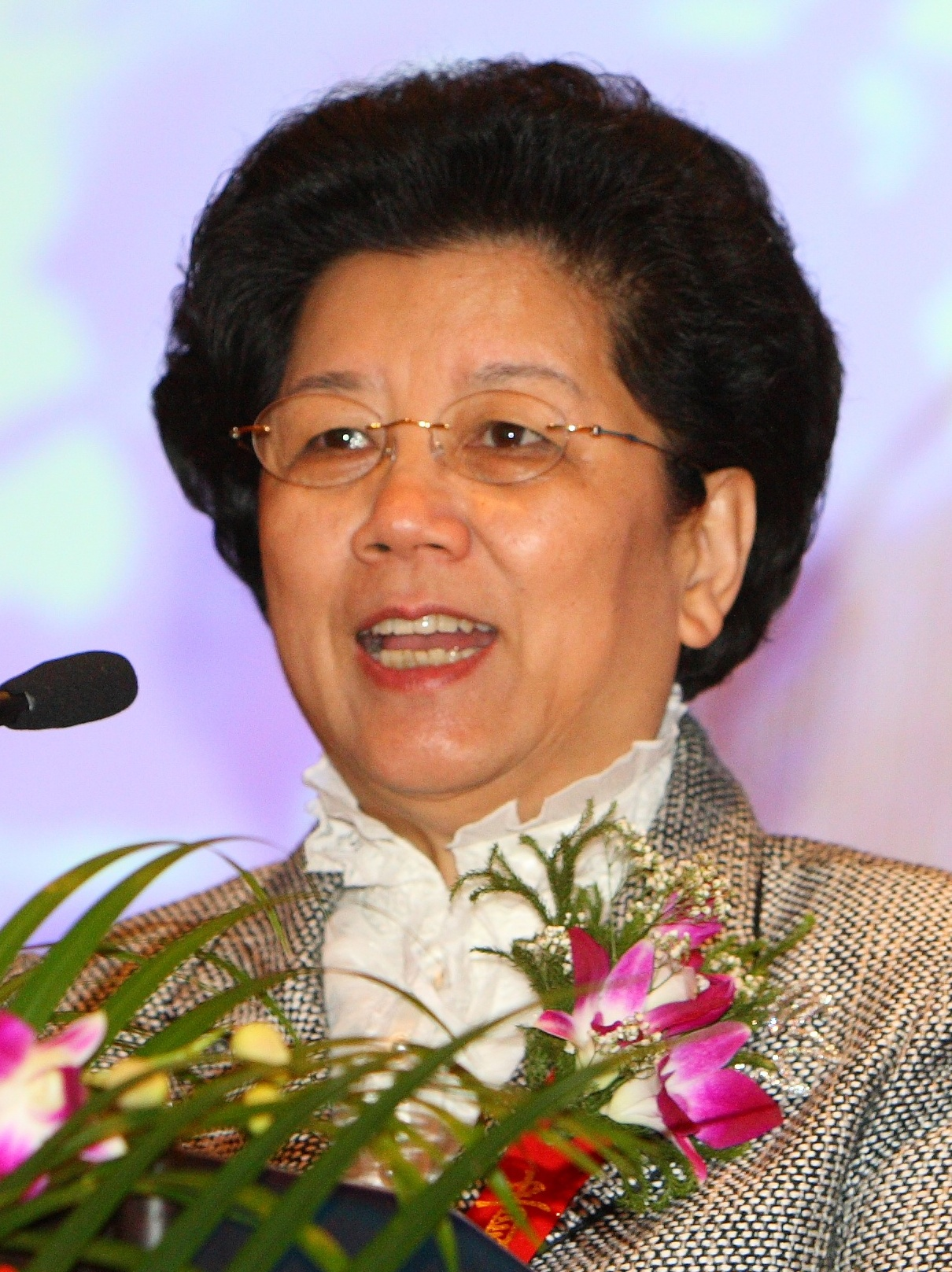
Chen Zhili, former President of the All-China Women's Federation, in 2009

Following the Cultural Revolution, the All-China Women's Federation began to prioritize protecting women's rights and promoting equality over its responsibilities as an organ of the party. While the ACWF was responsible for communicating how the CCP had helped the women's movement, they also began to critique the previous actions taken during the women's movement as having been unsuccessful in the face of China's dominant patriarchy. The ACWF increasingly studied women's movements in other countries, and held debates that transcended the parameters set by the CCP. ACWF campaigns became more diverse as they attempted to meet the disparate needs of the urban population and the rural population. While the ACWF continues to toe the party line, it is no longer involved in mass political campaigns. The party officially declared the ACWF a supervisory body in the early 1990s, so the ACWF is responsible for analyzing that effectiveness of the government in promoting women's rights. It was also approved to found for-profit businesses in 1992, so it less reliant on government financing, and more autonomous in setting its own agenda.

The new focus was on women's self-discovery; and the ACWF launched the Four Self Campaign consisting of: self-respect, self-confidence, self-improvement, and self-reliance. An example of the ACWF balancing its government responsibilities with its responsibility to the women of China can be seen in the one-child policy. The ACWF was responsible for publicizing the policy and its content, but questioned if the policy respected the rights of women. In the end, the ACWF settled on requesting that its cadres comply with the law to set a good example for the country, to promote the One-Child policy to the Chinese women, and to strongly condemn any coercive action related to the policy.

In 1979, the ACWF established the History of Chinese Women's Movement Compilation Committee and Research Office. This body compiled and published historical material and analysis of the women's movement, which it circulated as a journal from 1981 to 1986.

In 1989, the ACWF published The History of the Chinese Women's Movement, New Democratic Period, which discusses the pre-1949 women's movement in China. The work highlights the contributions of women during the Second Sino-Japanese War and their involvement in the CCP's efforts. It also discusses women's activism through liberal feminist organizations, Christian organizations, and the Kuomintang.

In 1991, the ACWF established the Women's Studies Institute of China, which began publishing the Journal of Women's Studies the next year.

The ACWF also expanded its legal training for cadres, strengthened its finances, became involved with gay rights, fought employment discrimination and female trafficking, and introduced legislation to meet the challenges faced by women. In 2000, ACWF developed jobs for one million unemployed women by creating small economic (for profit) entities in which women can work as family service aides or in women's service groups. The organization also helps China's "leftover" women. These are women who remain unmarried after the age of 27. ACWF offers them alternatives to marriage such as the opportunity to pursue an education. With these changes, the ACWF became less concerned with mobilizing grass roots organization, and focused on its role in setting the public discourse for the social and political issues of women.

By 1994 the organization had over 68,000 branches and somewhere between 80,000 and 90,000 cadres. By 1995 the party declared the ACWF, at least nominally, a non-governmental organization in response to criticism from women's groups abroad. However, the international women's movement questioned the validity of that declaration. While the federation expanded in size, it became increasingly difficult to continue to reach all Chinese women through traditional channels. Other NGOs appeared to fill some of the void, but many of those became incorporated within the federation to gain legitimacy. By the end of the 1990s there were 6,386 women's associations and recreational clubs under the ACWF umbrella.

=== Xi Jinping era ===
In a 2023 address to the ACWF, CCP general secretary Xi Jinping instructed its members to "tell good stories about family traditions" and to "actively foster a new type of marriage and childbearing culture." At the 2026 International Women's Day, ACWF head Shen Yiqin called on women to follow the CCP, support the 15th Five-Year Plan, and "consolidate the family foundation for Chinese-style modernization."

== Organization ==
=== Structure ===
According to the Regulations on the Functional Configuration, Internal Structure, and Staffing of the All-China Women's Federation, the ACWF is a ministerial-level organization administered under the Civil Servant Law. The federation has established the following institutions:

==== Internal Departments ====
- General Office
- Organization Department
- Publicity Department
- Department of Women's Development
- Department of Rights Protection
- Department of Family and Children's Affairs
- Liaison Department
- Office of the State Council Working Committee on Women and Children
- CPC Committee of the ACWF
- Bureau for Retired Cadres

==== Directly Affiliated Public Institutions ====
- Women's Studies Institute of China
- Women of China Magazine
- China National Children's Center
- China Women's News Agency (ACWF Network Information and Communication Center)
- ACWF Social Liaison and Exchange Cooperation Center (Women of China Foreign Language Journal Agency)
- China Women's Activity Center
- ACWF Service Center (Administrative Service Bureau)
- China Children and Teenagers' Fund
- China Women's Development Foundation
- China Women's and Children's Museum

===== Directly Affiliated Higher Education Institution =====
- China Women's University (ACWF Cadre Training Institute)

==== Directly Affiliated Enterprises ====
- China Women's Publishing House Co., Ltd.
- China Women's Travel Service Co., Ltd.

==== Affiliated Social Organization ====
- China National Committee for the Wellbeing of the Next Generation

=== Actions and organizations ===
The main action of the All-China Women's Federation is funu gongzuo (women's work). The federation currently has seven functional departments to carry out this work: the Department for Children, the International Liaison Department, the Department for Women's Development, the Publicity Department, the Department for Women's Rights and Interests, the Human Resources Development Department and the General Office. The ACWF maintains a strong connection to the CCP through the women's committees in the government. These committees cover topics ranging from systems of education, science, arts and medicine. The party still does have direct control over some aspects of the ACWF through cadres, who work within the federation who may be receiving a government salary, and through the government's power of promotion.

The ACWF also has many affiliated organizations that expand its influence including: the China Women's Development Foundation, Marriage and Family Magazine, the Legal Assistance Center of the ACWF, the China Women's Activity Center, the China Women's University, the China Women's News, the China Women's Publishing House, Women of China Magazine Publishing House.

THE ACWF's also has a research institution, the Women's Studies Institute of China (WSIC). Among other research, since 1990 the ACWF conducts the national survey on women's status. Survey results deal with a range of aspects of women's life experiences and are used by domestic research institutes and academics.

The ACWF has over 49 newspapers and magazines, and major debates about the women's movement occur in its national journals the Women of China, Chinese Women's Movements, and Collection of Women's Studies. ACWF publications and studies demonstrate Marxist analytical perspectives.

The ACWF operates several programs for the benefit of left-behind children, including substitute parent programs, summer camps, and village volunteers.

=== Structure ===
==== Interaction with the Chinese Communist Party ====
Though the All-China Women's Federation claims itself as an NGO, its longstanding relationship with the CCP means that the party still has interests in the federation and its members. It identifies itself as "a people's organization under the leadership of the Communist Party of China" and "an important social pillar of the state power." The four levels of the federation still coincide with the state administrative system. The highest ranking body of the ACWF is the National Congress of Women which meets every five years. The National Congress Women studies reports sent to them from the executive committee of the ACWF, decide the goals for the women's movements, make changes to the constitution, and elect the executive committee and Standing Committees of the ACWF. Under this national level, the provincial level's women's congresses meet every three years to select their Executive and Standing Committees. However the local level must also carry out the directive and report to the CCP committee in addition to following the ACWF. This is supposed to give the organization a dual structure of carrying out party orders and informing the government of women's interests. Since 2015, the ACWF, together with other Party-affiliated "mass organisations" have launched a new round of reform in order to better represent the interest of their members and to defer to Party's authority in their work.

ACWF employees are public servants who must pass the examinations required of public servants.

==== Grass root versus upper levels of the ACWF ====
The All-China Women's Federation is run from the national level with the provincial, municipal, county, district and village levels below it. However it is considered a nominal hierarchical structure because the Party controls each level over and above the jurisdiction of the ACWF. Instead of direct control, the higher levels provide guidance, ideas, and trainings to the levels below it. Some members have complained that women trained by the party are promoted more rapidly than women trained by the ACWF. Due to this perceived promotion rate, the grass roots members are incentivized to follow the demands of the party instead of the demands of the ACWF. Other members of the ACWF believe that the grassroots structure is successfully in touch with the women they are working for since they are on the front lines of the movement, and see little problem with the disconnect between the upper levels of the party and grassroots levels.

=== Relationship with the women's movement ===
One of the problems that the All-China Women's Federation has identified is that women in China do not understand the federation's contributions or significance in the women's movement. The members of the ACWF identified two potential sources for the lack of understanding. The first is that the ACWF has many roles and branch organizations which may be obscuring the contribution it is making. The second is that it has lacked consistency in how it has represented women, especially during its early years. Another problem facing the ACWF is its relationship with the international women's movement.

== March 8th Red Banner awards ==
The March 8th Red Banner Bearer (Chinese: 三八红旗手; pinyin: Sān Bā Hóngqíshǒu), March 8th Red Banner Pacesetter (Chinese: 三八红旗手标兵; pinyin: Sān Bā Hóngqíshǒu Biāobīng), and March 8th Red Banner Collective (Chinese: 三八红旗集体; pinyin: Sān Bā Hóngqí Jítǐ) awards are honors given by the All-China Women's Federation on March 8, International Women's Day, to recognize outstanding women in China. The red banner bearer and red banner pacesetter awards are given to individuals, with the pacesetter award being more selective and prestigious, while the collective award is given to groups. The awards are given on both the national and the provincial level.

These awards began to be awarded in 1960, stopped for a period, and resumed in 1979. Initially, the awards were motivated by the goal of expanding the workforce to include more women.

The 1960 awards were hosted by the All-China Women's Federation together with China National Radio and eight other organizations. In 1960, they were awarded based on political criteria and based on contributions to industry and technology.

== Challenges ==
=== Cooperation with outside women's groups ===
The All-China Women's Federation is the largest women's organization in China and the only women's organization still in existence that appeared before the 1980s. However, the ACWF has recently been struggling to adequately represent a diverse range of women's interest, and some critics believe that women's growing needs ought to be represented by a more diverse group of organizations. Most women-interest NGOs operating in China are currently listed under the ACWF and have sought a close relationship with the organization to gain legitimacy and protection. Some of the organizations that are listed outside the ACWF are run by women who are affiliated with the ACWF, so there is considerable overlap. New women's groups have more freedom in exploring sensitive topics and alternative theories on gender because they are not affiliated with the government in any manner. The ACWF has encouraged some of these groups to form, and brought others under their umbrella, which extends the reach of the ACWF. However, given the limited resources available to the women's movement, and the ACWF historically representing the only large organization, tensions exists between these women's groups and the ACWF.

=== NGO status ===
The state officially labeled the All-China Women's Federation an NGO in 1995. Yet how applicable the term NGO is to the ACWF has been contested, given the ACWF's long and continuing relationship with the CCP. Some leaders in the women's movement opposed the ACWF attending an NGO forum in Manila in 1993 because they did not believe that it met the criteria of an NGO. Even the ACWF hesitates using the term NGO within China because it has been linked to antigovernmental groups, although it has embraced the title internationally. International donor agencies generally are more likely to work with NGO's, so the classification of an NGO has helped the ACWF obtain financing from international organizations. Others believe that the ACWF classifies as an NGO because it has separated itself from the government in recent years, and still others believes that ACWF could be classified as a NGO if the definition was broadened.

=== Public recognition ===
In recent years, the ACWF has suffered a marked decline in public recognition of the organization, influenced by the power dynamics of its direct supporter, the CCP government, and the CCP government's promotion of its people's impressions of the ACWF.

=== Conservative themes ===
In March 2011, the All-China Women's Federation posted a controversial article titled 'Leftover Women Do Not Deserve Our Sympathy' shortly after International Women's Day. An excerpt stated, "Pretty girls do not need a lot of education to marry into a rich and powerful family. But girls with an average or ugly appearance will find it difficult" and "These girls hope to further their education in order to increase their competitiveness. The tragedy is, they don't realise that as women age, they are worth less and less. So by the time they get their MA or PhD, they are already old – like yellowed pearls." Originally at least 15 articles were available on its website relating to the subject of sheng nu (leftover women), which have now been subsequently removed, that included matchmaking advice and tips.

== See also ==
- Government-organized non-governmental organization
- Women in China
- Feminism in China
- Gender equality
- March 8th Red Banner Pacesetter
