= Currency Wars =

Book by Hongbing Song

- Author: Song Hongbing
- Language: Chinese, Korean, Japanese, Polish French, Vietnamese
- Subject: Financial history
- Genre: Economic antisemitism
- Publication date: 2007
- Publication place: China
- Media type: Hardcover, paperback
- ISBN: 978-957-32-6379-1

Currency Wars (simplified Chinese: 货币战争; traditional Chinese: 貨幣戰爭; pinyin: Huòbì zhànzhēng), also referred to as The Currency War, is an antisemitic essay by Chinese author Song Hongbing. Originally published in 2007, it gained a resurgence in 2009 and has been described as a prominent exponent of a recently emerged genre labeled "economic nationalist" literature. The premise of the book is that Western countries are controlled by a group of Jewish international bankers, which, according to Song, runs their central banks. It uses the claim that the Federal Reserve is a private body to support its role.

Reportedly selling over 200,000 copies in addition to an estimated 400,000 unlicensed copies in circulation in 2009, it was a bestseller in China, reportedly being read by many senior level government and business leaders in the country. Unlike other books within the genre, e.g. Unhappy China, Currency Wars has been received more positively by the Chinese leadership as its recommendations are seen as less aggressive towards the US. It was however criticized as being far-fetched and relying on conspiracism. As of 2011, more than one million copies of this book have been sold.

== Synopsis ==
According to the book, Western countries in general, and the United States in particular, are controlled by a clique of Jewish international bankers, who use currency manipulation (hence the title) to gain wealth by first loaning money in USD to developing nations and then shorting those country's currency. The Japanese Lost Decade, the 1997 Asian financial crisis, the Latin American financial crisis and others are attributed to this cause. It also claims that the Rothschild family has the wealth of 5 trillion dollars whereas Bill Gates only has 40 billion dollars.

Song also is of the opinion that the famous U.S. central bank, the Federal Reserve, is not a department of state functions, but several private banks operated by the private sector, and that these private banks are loyal to the ubiquitous Rothschild family.

On June 4, 1963, President Kennedy signed an executive order, which, as an amendment to Executive Order 10289, delegated the authority to issue silver certificates (notes convertible to silver on demand) to the Secretary of the Treasury. Song says the direct consequence was that the Federal Reserve lost its monopoly to control money.

The book looks back at history and argues that fiat currency itself is a conspiracy; it sees in the abolition of representative currency and the installment of fiat currency a struggle between the "banking clique" and the governments of the western nations, ending in the victory of the former. It advises the Chinese government to keep a vigilant eye on China's currency and instate a representative currency.

== Reception ==
The book has achieved bestseller status in China. Although acknowledging the book's huge popularity in China, the Financial Times described it as only passably entertaining and its thesis as far-fetched. Fred Hu, managing director of Goldman Sachs Group, said the currency wars were "non-existent". He uses in his review words such as "a simple out of line, outrageous distortion", "many errors, out-of-context, far-fetched, exaggerated, or simply speculative, uncertain", and the conclusion to this book as a "melted mixed the ultra-left trend of thought, far-right tendencies, populism, isolationism, anarchism".

According to Zhang Jiayi, it could be argued that the "currency wars" series of books' goal in promoting the conspiracy theory is precisely to meet the angry psychology of youth.

The book has been criticized in the New York Times for promoting antisemitic conspiracy theories. The book says that Jews have been conspiring to covertly influence historical events ranging from the Battle of Waterloo to the assassination of John F. Kennedy, with the intention of increasing their wealth and influence. In this respect, the Orthodox Jewish press postulated that the material echoes traditional antisemitic conspiracy theories such as The Protocols of the Learned Elders of Zion, The International Jew, and Nazi propaganda like Der Stürmer., although this interpretation has been considered unfair by some Chinese journalists who claim the allegations made in the text are true and that China generally has no history of antisemitism.

Several Chinese-American scholars also gave the first book negative reviews. Chen Zhiwu (Yale University) affirmed the reference validity of the details the book provided, such as "what the Rothschild family did, what impacts the financial sector has on a country's development, etc". However, he finds the author, by that time the structured finance department manager of Hong Yuan Securities, lacks financial expertise to be qualified to prescribe future directions to China. Zhang Xin (University of Toledo/Ohio) finds the book rich in historical knowledge, many of which he would not be able to analyse, but as a currency and financial system researcher, he believes the framework of the book is completely wrong and criticizes the book as lacking in "common sense".

The author responded to these comments by saying "While many scholars have voiced their objections to this book, they are aimed at the details of the book, not its logic or structure."

== Sequels ==
In July 2009, the book was followed by a sequel, Currency Wars 2: World of Gold Privilege (Chinese: 货币战争2：金权天下), published by China Industry and Commerce Publishing House (ISBN 978-9573265214), which the Financial Times reported as being one of the most popular books in China by late 2009. More than two million copies have been sold. In this book, Song predicted that by 2024, the world's single currency system will mature. He believes that if China cannot be dominant in this system, it should not participate, but should be self-reliant, have their own sphere of financial influence.

In May 2011, a second sequel, Currency Wars 3: Financial High Frontier (Chinese: 货币战争3：金融高边疆), was published by Yuan-Liou Publishing (ISBN 978-9573267843). It discusses more specifically modern Chinese history, from Chiang Kai-shek to the depreciation trend of the U.S. dollar in the long term, seen from a currency war perspective. It pushes towards an isolationist financial policy.

== See also ==
- Antisemitism in China
- Death by China
- Monetary reform
- Petrodollar warfare
