= China Women's News =

Chinese newspaper

中国妇女报 China Women's News
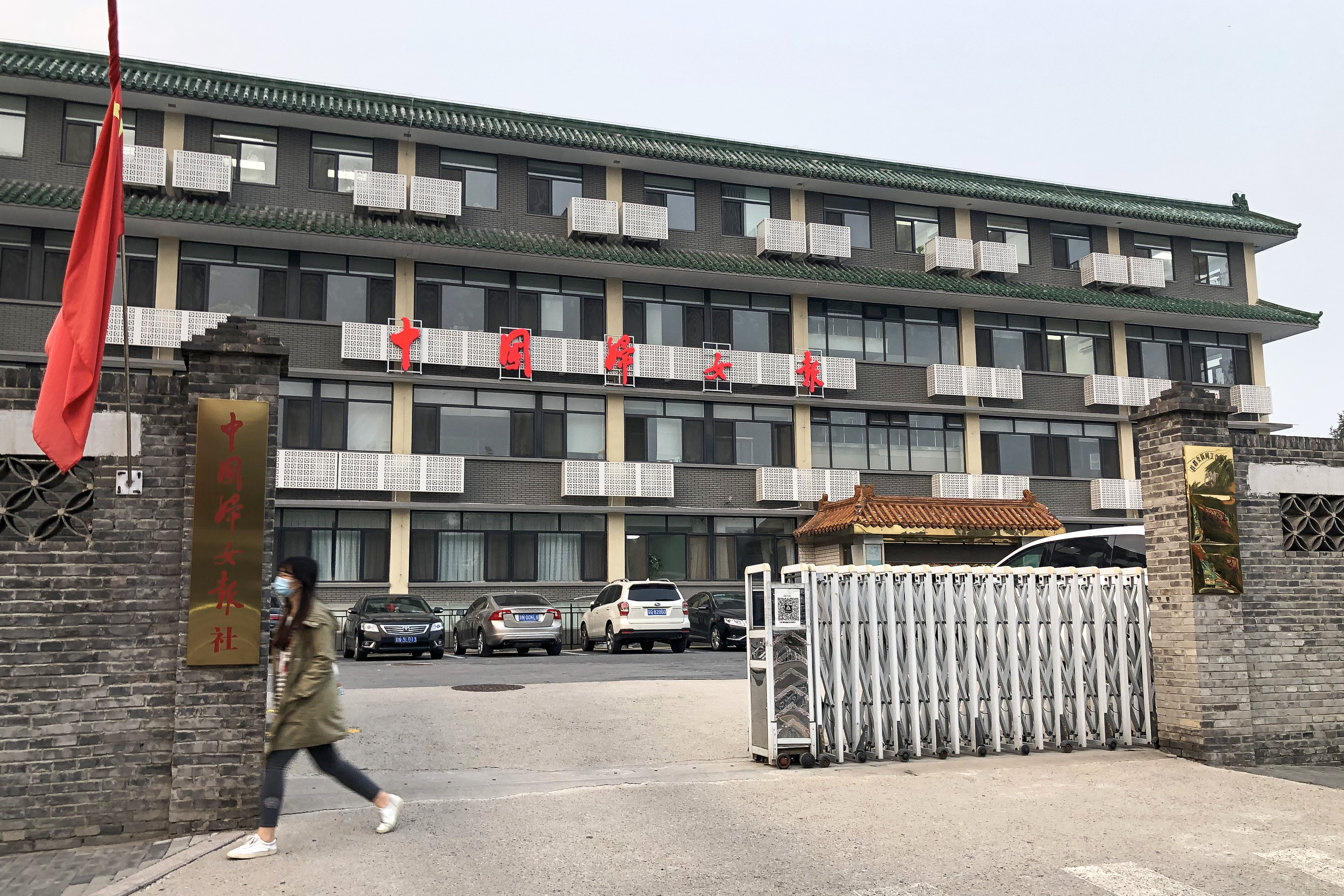
- Headquarters of China Women's News
- Type: Daily newspaper
- Format: Broadsheet
- Owner: All-China Women's Federation
- Publisher: All-China Women's Federation
- Language: Simplified Chinese
- Headquarters: No. 103, West Di'anmen Street, Xicheng District, Beijing, China
- Website: epaper.cnwomen.com.cn

China Women's News (Chinese: 中国妇女报) is the official newspaper of the All-China Women's Federation (ACWF). It is the only national daily newspaper in the People's Republic of China focusing on women's issues and is recognized as one of the central major news outlets. The masthead was inscribed by Deng Xiaoping at its founding.

== History ==
China Women's News was first published on 3 October 1984, with its title written by Deng Xiaoping, and sponsored and supervised by the All-China Women's Federation. In October 1984, the inaugural issue of China Women's News was published. In 1998, the newspaper launched its official website, China Women's Net (中华女性网). On 18 July 2004, it became the first newspaper in China to launch a mobile edition (MMS version). On 3 January 2019, its official mobile application was launched.

== Honors ==
China Women's News has received multiple awards, including recognition as one of China's Top 100 Newspapers and as a "Civilized Unit" of the capital. Its journalists have won the China News Award, the Changjiang & Taofen Award, and other honors. In March 2018, it was named one of the "Top 100 Newspapers of 2017".
