= Fang Fang =

Chinese writer (born 1955)

- 方方
- Born: Wang Fang (汪芳); 11 May 1955 (age 71); Nanjing, China
- Education: Wuhan University
- Occupation: Writer
- Writing career
- Language: Chinese
- Years active: 1982–present
- Notable works: Feng Shui (万箭穿心); Bare Burial (软埋); Wuhan Diary
- Notable awards: Lu Xun Literary Prize

Chinese name
- Chinese: 方方
Transcriptions
Standard Mandarin
- Hanyu Pinyin: Fāng Fāng

Fang Fang (Chinese: 方方), pen name of Wang Fang (汪芳; born 11 May 1955), is a Chinese writer, known for her literary depictions of the working poor. She won the Lu Xun Literary Prize in 2010. Born in Nanjing, she attended Wuhan University in 1978 to study Chinese. In 1975, she began to write poetry and in 1982, her first novel was published. She has since written several novels, some of which have been honored by Chinese national-level literary prizes. Fang garnered international attention for her Wuhan Diary, documenting the early stages of the COVID-19 pandemic in China, and has used her platform to call for an end to internet censorship in China.

== Wuhan Diary ==
During the 2020 Hubei lockdowns, Fang Fang used Weibo share her Wuhan Diary (武汉日记), a daily account of life in the locked-down city of Wuhan. In addition to her own writing, Wuhan Diary utilized anonymous interviews with other people in the city. The account drew international public attention.

Fang Fang—a member of China Writers Association and the former chairwoman of the officially affiliated Hubei Writers' Association—was considered to be a "politically trustworthy figure".

== Reception ==
Some Chinese netizens responded with criticism or ridicule. Others questioned the truthfulness of her accounts or contended that she was spreading "hearsay". One of Fang Fang's critics is Zhang Boli—a Traditional Chinese Medicine physician— who spent 82 days working in Wuhan's front lines. Zhang criticized those who had expressed "distorted values," including Fang Fang, in an online speech he gave on May 12, 2020, about the national struggle to fight the virus. Fang Fang then contacted Zhang on Weibo for an apology, which prompted a heated debate on the social media platform. Netizens argued that Fang Fang, who resided in her villa and posting her diary online, did not have as much credibility compared to Zhang, who was a doctor in the front lines.

Fang Fang's domestic supporters were primarily middle-aged people who saw her as holding government figures accountable. Academic and journalist Liang Yu described the debates in China about Fang Fang as "not a war between left and right, but between old and new."

Responding to early criticisms, Fang Fang stated that she was "grieving and venting" and that her account was "absolutely consistent with the government's position".

Domestic criticism of Fang Fang increased after it became public knowledge that her book Wuhan Diary: Dispatches from a Quarantined City had been expedited for publication in English and German. Those who criticized Fang Fang contended that Fang Fang's writing was used by anti-Chinese elements to spread conspiracy theories about COVID-19's origins and to make unjustified criticisms of China.

The gong-ringing daughter (who became famous on social media for trying to save her sick mother after her mother was refused hospital admission), condemned Fang Fang's writing about her. The gong-ringing daughter wrote that Fang Fang had "defamed" China by "weaponizing" the gong-ringing story. She also requested of Fang Fang, "Please do not include me in your diary, I don't wish to go abroad."

Hu Xijin wrote:

[T]he public has every right to express their strong dissatisfaction for the Diary of Fang Fang. This represents an important aspect of the plurality. Many people would feel differently about the Diary now that they have witnessed a much more severe humanitarian crisis going on in the pandemic-ridden US and can reconsider the combat against the outbreak in Wuhan in a larger context.

In Wuhan Diary (2020), and also other sources, Fang Fang continuously insists that her diary is not in any way aimed against the Chinese government. In an interview for Caixin, she makes a point that "there's no tension between me and the country, and my book will only help the country" and that her "diary is by no means about the so-called negative things in China or deliberately peddling misery as misinterpreted by extremists. They take it out of context."

Within China, Fang Fang has faced criticism, being labelled as a liar and "traitor" by users on social media platforms such as Weibo due to her perceived criticism of the Chinese government. Wuheqilin satirized her with his image Crown of a Jester, depicting Fang Fang as a court jester for a uniformed white master sitting on a throne and performing for Western journalists in the gallery. It portrayed her as having "handed over the knife" with which her "Western sponsors" could attack China.

Fang Fang continued writing, however, despite the fact that some of her works have been blocked from publication.

In the west, Fang Fang was met with almost unanimously positive reaction. Fang Fang's publishing house, HarperCollins states that her work is a display of courage to expose social injustice, corruption and sociopolitical problems that hindered the response to the pandemic. Fang Fang was on the list of the BBC's 100 Women announced on 23 November 2020.

== Translated works (English) ==
- Contemporary Women Writers V: Three Novellas by Fang Fang. Beijing: Panda Books. 1996. ISBN 9780835131834. Contains One Glittering Moment, Landscape, and Dead End.
- Love and its Lack are Emblazoned on the Heart Forever, translated by Eleanor Goodman in By the River: Seven Contemporary Chinese Novellas. Norman: Oklahoma University Press. 2016. ISBN 9780806154046.
- Wuhan Diary: Dispatches from a Quarantined City. Translated by Michael Berry. New York: HarperCollins. 2020. ISBN 9780063052642.
- The Walls of Wuchang. Translated by Olivia Milburn. Horsham: Sinoist Books. 2022. ISBN 9781838905118.
- Soft Burial. Translated by Michael Berry. New York: Columbia University Press. 2024. ISBN 9780231214988.
- The Running Flame. Translated by Michael Berry. New York: Columbia University Press. 2024. ISBN 9780231215008.

== See also ==
- Li Wenliang
- Chen Qiushi
- Fang Bin
- Wuhan Huanan Seafood Wholesale Market

Cultural offices
Previous: Wang Xianpei	President of Hubei Writers Association; 2007-2018	Next: Li Xiuwen (李修文)
