= Wuhan Diary =

2020 book by Fang Fang

- Author: Fang Fang
- Frequency: Daily
- Format: Online diary
- Publisher: Self-published
- First issue: 25 January 2020; 6 years ago
- Final issue Number: 25 March 2020; 60
- Country: China
- Based in: Wuhan
- Language: Chinese

Wuhan Diary (Chinese: 武汉日记; pinyin: Wǔhàn rìjì) is an online diary written by Chinese writer Fang Fang about the life of the people of Wuhan, China during the Wuhan lockdown, while efforts to quarantine the center of an outbreak of COVID-19 and stop it from spreading were ongoing. An English translation of the diary, titled Wuhan Diary: Dispatches from a Quarantined City, was published in book format by HarperCollins in June 2020.

== Background ==
During the 2020 Hubei lockdowns, her Wuhan Diary (武汉日记), the daily account of the locked down city's posted on social media, was widely made public. However, each post was quickly deleted by censors. Fang Fang's Weibo account, which had more than 3.8 million followers, was shut down in February. It was later reinstated. Fang Fang started the diary on 25 January 2020, two days after Wuhan was locked down. She published her 60th and what she called her final entry shortly after midnight on 25 March 2020, hours after the authorities announced that Wuhan's lockdown would end on 8 April. Fang wrote her diary from her house in Wuhan's Wuchang District, where she lives alone.

An English translation, titled Wuhan Diary: Dispatches from a Quarantined City, translated by Michael Berry, was published in book format by HarperCollins in June 2020.

== Reactions ==
Fang Fang's diary had received polarized responses from the Chinese public. Academic and journalist Liang Yu described the debates in China about Fang Fang as "not a war between left and right, but between old and new." Fang Fang's domestic supporters were primarily middle-aged people who saw her as holding government figures accountable. Detractors were often younger, and questioned the truthfulness of her accounts or contended that she was spreading "hearsay".

Public criticism of Fang Fang in China increased after it became known that her work was being expedited for publication in English and German. Those who criticized Fang Fang contended that her writing was used by anti-Chinese elements to spread conspiracy theories about COVID-19's origins and to make unjustified criticisms of China.

Hu Xijin wrote:

[T]he public has every right to express their strong dissatisfaction for the Diary of Fang Fang. This represents an important aspect of the plurality. Many people would feel differently about the Diary now that they have witnessed a much more severe humanitarian crisis going on in the pandemic-ridden US and can reconsider the combat against the outbreak in Wuhan in a larger context.

Michael Berry started translating Wuhan Diary into English beginning in February 2020. The German version was translated by Michael Kahn-Ackermann, and was published by Hoffmann und Campe Verlag on 30 May 2020. Berry received angry and death threat emails for translating the diary.

In her Wuhan Diary, Fang Fang called for an end to the Internet censorship in China: "Dear internet censors, you should let Wuhan people speak".

== See also ==
- Fang Fang
- Wuhan Huanan Seafood Wholesale Market
