= Victims of the Cultural Revolution =

Book by Wang Youqin

Victims of the Cultural Revolution: Testimonies of China's Tragedy
- Author: Wang Youqin
- Language: English, Chinese
- Subject: Cultural Revolution
- Published: 2004 (Chinese, Open Books, Hong Kong); 2023 (English, Oneworld Publications, United Kingdom)
- Pages: 592
- ISBN: 9780861542239

Victims of the Cultural Revolution: Testimonies of China's Tragedy is a book by Chinese historian Wang Youqin on the Chinese Cultural Revolution (1966 – 1976). The book documents detailed stories of hundreds of individuals who were persecuted during the Cultural Revolution. The book was originally published in Chinese in 2004 in Hong Kong, and was later updated and published by Oneworld Publications in 2023 after being translated into English by Stacy Mosher.

== Summary ==
After the Chinese Cultural Revolution ended, Wang Youqin spent decades interviewing survivors of the Revolution and collecting historical details. In 2004, the Chinese version of her book (Victim of the Cultural Revolution—An Investigative Account of Persecution, Imprisonment and Murder) was published in Hong Kong by Open Books (开放出版社), detailing stories of 659 victims of the Cultural Revolution, including that of Bian Zhongyun, the first education worker who was beaten to death by Red Guards during the "Red August" of Beijing in 1966. In addition, the book also contains some historical details of other political movements during Mao Zedong's rule of China, such as the Anti-Rightist Campaign.

In 2023, the English version of Wang's book (Victims of the Cultural Revolution: Testimonies of China's Tragedy) was published by Oneworld Publications. Wang Youqin and translator Stacy Mosher rearranged and updated the original Chinese version of the book. It was reported that Wang Youqin had interviewed approximately 1,000 people.

== Reception ==
The book has received critical acclaims from a number of historians and researchers. Yu Ying-shih commented that "I find this book to have enormous historical value, and believe it will serve as a foundation for future historians carrying out research into the political, educational, and social history of this period." Roderick MacFarquhar stated that "Wang Youqin is one of a number of Chinese-born scholars in the United States who have been undertaking the Cultural Revolution research that cannot be done in China. In this book, Professor Wang takes a very important step in the direction of making her fellow Chinese confront their recent past." Frank Dikötter called the book "carefully composed and captivating", saying that "May Wang Youqin’s monumental book reach beyond the narrow confines of the ivory tower and attract the many readers it so obviously deserves."

Feng Chongyi commented on Wang's book that "by providing invaluable details about the violence of the Cultural Revolution, especially the atrocities committed on innocent victims, it fills a gap in our knowledge of what actually happened", but he also added that "a limitation of the book is that it does not document the biographical detail of many of the victims, and the data generated by the interviews are not always viable. This results in some stories rather randomly being given more space than others."

== See also ==
- Red August
- Song Binbin
- Struggle session
- Five Black Categories
- Stinking Old Ninth
