= Song Binbin =

Chinese revolutionary (1947–2024)

- 宋彬彬
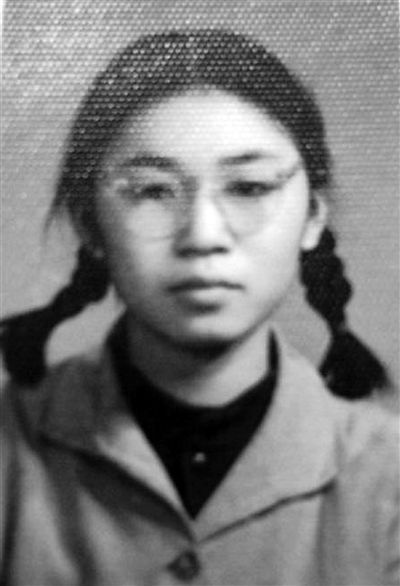
- Song in the 1960s.
- Born: 1947; Beijing, China
- Died: September 16, 2024 (aged 77); New York City, U.S.
- Other name: Song Yaowu
- Citizenship: American
- Known for: Student Red Guards leader during the Cultural Revolution, involvement with death of teacher Bian Zhongyun
- Political party: Chinese Communist Party
- Movement: Cultural Revolution
- Parent(s): Song Renqiong (father); Zhong Yuelin (mother)

Song Binbin
- Simplified Chinese: 宋彬彬
Transcriptions
Standard Mandarin
- Hanyu Pinyin: Sòng Bīn bīn
- Wade–Giles: Song^{4} Bin^{1}bin^{1}

Song Binbin (Chinese: 宋彬彬, 1947 – 16 September 2024), also known as Song Yaowu (Chinese: 宋要武), was a Chinese Red Guard leader during the Cultural Revolution who later became an American geochemist and businesswoman. The daughter of the communist leader Song Renqiong, she was a student leader at the girls' high school attached to Beijing Normal University when its vice-principal, Bian Zhongyun, was beaten to death by students on 5 August 1966. Song denied taking part in the killing, but her role remained disputed for the rest of her life.

== Early life ==
Song was born in 1947, one of the eight children of Song Renqiong, a general of the People's Liberation Army and later one of the party's Eight Elders, and his wife, Zhong Yuelin. She attended the Girls' High School attached to Beijing Normal University (now the Experimental High School Attached to Beijing Normal University), an elite school in Beijing.

== Cultural Revolution ==
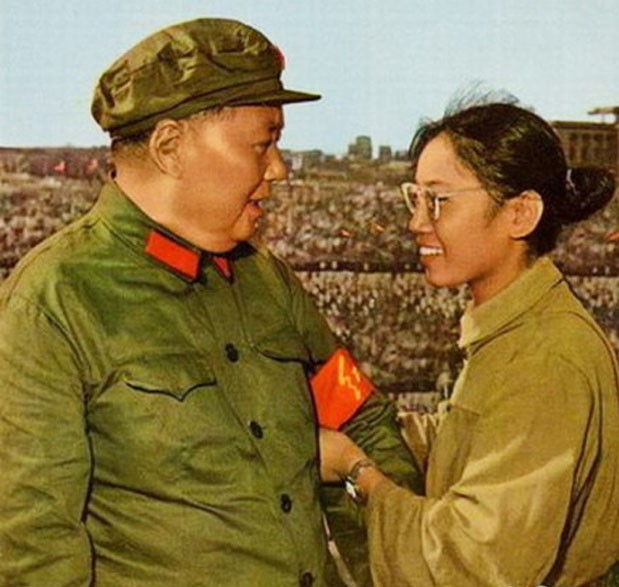
Song ties a red armband on Mao Zedong at the Tiananmen rostrum, 1966

=== Student leader ===
According to her own account, Song joined the Chinese Communist Party (CCP) in April 1966. On 2 June 1966, she and two other students, Liu Jin and Ma Dexiu, put up the school's first big-character poster of the Cultural Revolution, which accused the school's authorities of elitism and stagnation. The poster led to struggle sessions against teachers and administrators. Song became one of four vice-chairs of the school's student representative committee, and in August she became a deputy director of its Cultural Revolution preparatory committee, which Liu Jin chaired. In early July, the work team sent to the school classified Bian and another vice-principal, Hu Zhitao, as "four-category cadres", the most serious category of officials under suspicion. Students had already beaten Bian for more than four hours on 21 June 1966.

=== Death of Bian Zhongyun ===
On 5 August 1966, students at the school attacked Bian Zhongyun and two other administrators for about three hours, using clubs spiked with nails and boiling water. Bian lost consciousness, and she was put in a rubbish cart and later found dead at a nearby hospital. The historian Wang Youqin called her the first educator in Beijing to be beaten to death by students. According to Andreas Lorenz of Der Spiegel, Song was presumably present when Bian was killed. In her own account, Song wrote that she had not known in advance that the school's leaders would be struggled against, and that she and Liu Jin had tried to stop the beatings and had helped to take Bian to hospital. Her name was among those of the students on a guarantee list at the hospital. That night, she and Liu Jin went to the Beijing Hotel to report to Wu De, the second secretary of the Beijing party committee, who, in her account, told them that "if someone is dead, they are dead".

Bian's death was followed by the Red August killings, in which, according to official figures, Red Guards killed 1,772 people in Beijing.

=== Armband for Mao ===
On 18 August 1966, at a rally of about a million Red Guards in Tiananmen Square, Song pinned a Red Guard armband on Mao's sleeve on the Tiananmen rostrum. Liu Jin had chosen her to represent the school. When Mao learned that her name was Binbin, meaning "refined" or "gentle", he replied "Yaowu ma", suggesting that she should instead be "martial". The historian James Carter wrote that the presentation was probably choreographed rather than spontaneous. On 20 August 1966, the Guangming Daily published an article about the rally, entitled "I put a Red Guard armband on Chairman Mao", under the name Song Yaowu. Song later said that she had not written the article and had not been consulted, and that the name Yaowu had been forced on her. She described the name as contrary to her nature, and she later said that the "Song Yaowu" persona had been fabricated.

=== Wuhan and Inner Mongolia ===
In late August 1966, Wang Renzhong met Song and Liu Jin at the Diaoyutai State Guesthouse and asked them to go to Wuhan. Liu declined, and Song went to Wuhan in early September with four classmates. An open letter in her name, defending the Hubei provincial party committee, then appeared in a local newspaper. Song wrote that its wording was stronger than that of the draft her group had submitted, and she issued a statement saying that she had not written it, although she still opposed overthrowing the provincial committee. Her refusal to call for the committee's overthrow drew criticism from the party.

After returning to Beijing, Song withdrew from the movement, and she did not join any of the later Red Guard organisations. Her father was labelled a "capitalist roader" in 1967, and he was expelled from the party in 1968. In April 1968, she and her mother were placed under house arrest in Shenyang. In early 1969, she escaped and joined her classmates in Inner Mongolia. In 1972, after initial local opposition, she was admitted to the Changchun Institute of Geology (now part of Jilin University) as a worker-peasant-soldier student, and she graduated in 1975.

== Later life ==
=== Education and career ===
From 1978 to 1980, Song was a graduate student at the Chinese Academy of Sciences, and in 1980 she went to the United States. She received a master's degree in geochemistry from Boston University in 1983, and a doctorate from MIT in 1989. She became a naturalised American citizen, took the name Yan Song, and married Jin Jiansheng, the president of a Massachusetts company. From 1989 to 2003, she worked as an environmental analyst for the Massachusetts Department of Environmental Protection. In 2003, she returned to China, where she chaired two Beijing technology companies, Beijing Cobia System Engineering and Beijing Cobia Innovation Technology Development.

In September 2007, her old school named her one of its 90 honorary alumni to mark its 90th anniversary, and its commemorative booklet showed her placing the armband on Mao. Bian's widower, Wang Jingyao, protested against the choice, saying that the armband was soaked in his wife's blood.

=== Controversy over Bian's death ===
From the 1990s, Wang Youqin, a former student at the school, researched Bian's death. In her 2004 book Victims of the Cultural Revolution, Wang described Bian's killing and accused Song of taking part in the violence. In the 2003 documentary Morning Sun, directed by Carma Hinton, Geremie Barmé and Richard Gordon, Song gave an anonymised interview in which she denied any part in the violence. She said in the film that she "was always opposed to violence", and she denied taking part in the campaign against the Four Olds. The 2006 documentary Though I Am Gone, by Hu Jie, centred on Wang Jingyao and presented Song as responsible for Bian's death.

In January 2012, Song published a detailed account of the events in the unofficial journal Jiyi (Remembrance), and the same issue carried an interview with Liu Jin. The historians Susanne Weigelin-Schwiedrzik and Cui Jinke wrote that many people who had accepted Wang Youqin's account came to accept Song's version, although Wang continued to reject it.

=== Apology ===
On 12 January 2014, at a gathering of former students and teachers at her old school, Song bowed before a statue of Bian and read a statement of about 1,500 characters. She said that she wished "to express my everlasting grief and apologies to Principal Bian", and that her failure to protect the school leaders had been "a source of lifelong pain and remorse". She did not specify her own role, and she called on former Red Guards who had harmed teachers and classmates to reflect, seek forgiveness and seek reconciliation. Her statement was also published on the website Consensus Net.

The apology drew mixed reactions in China. Some people welcomed it, while others said that it came too late, was inadequate, or that the CCP itself should apologise. It set off a wide public debate on the Chinese internet. On 13 January 2014, the authorities ordered websites to play down the apology. The social critic Cui Weiping said: "It's meaningless to say you witnessed a murder and then say you don't know who the killers were." Wang Youqin said that Song's responsibility for the violence at the school was obvious, because of her position on the school's revolutionary committee. She also said that the apology went further than that of Chen Xiaolu, who had apologised in October 2013, but still fell far short of a full reckoning.

Wang Jingyao, who had not been invited to the ceremony, called the apology hypocritical, and he said that he would not accept it until the truth about his wife's death was made public. He said of Song: "She is a bad person, because of what she did." He also blamed Mao and the party as a whole for the violence. Wang Jingyao died in August 2021.

=== Death ===
Song died in New York City on 16 September 2024, at the age of 77. Her brother, Song Kehuang, announced her death on WeChat, saying that she had died peacefully. Her husband had died in 2011, and she was survived by her son, Yan Jin. Her death was reported in obituaries in Britain and the United States. Journalist Gao Yu said that Song's case was a typical example of Red Guard crimes, and that former Red Guards of her generation now held power in China.
