= Cow demons and snake spirits =

Phrase by Du Mu, used during the Cultural Revolution to demonize perceived enemies

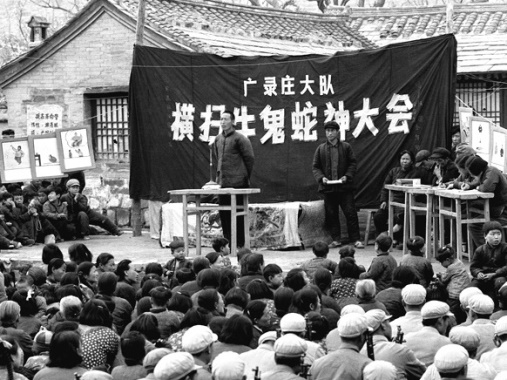
A rally in 1966

Cow demons and snake spirits (Chinese: 牛鬼蛇神; pinyin: Niúguǐshéshén), also rendered in English as ox-demons and snake-spirits is a Chinese term used during the Cultural Revolution (1966–1976) to demonize perceived enemies. Tang dynasty poet Du Mu (803–852) coined the term in the preface of a poetry collection by Li He (791–817) to praise the fantastical elements in Li's poetry.

== History ==
The term is rooted in Buddhist demonology. The poet Du Mu first used the term during the Tang dynasty in a preface describing the supernatural in Li He's poetry. In a preface to a collection of Li He's work, Du Mu wrote, "Gaping whales and bounding sea-tortoises, ox-monsters and snake-demons—these are not enough to convey their fanciful and outlandish illusions."

Mao Zedong borrowed the phrase from its usage in Journey to the West. Mao first began using the term in his speeches during spring 1957. He first used it in March of that year, referring to ghost plays in traditional operas:

I don't approve of ox-demons and snake-spirits. Let them be performed so we can criticize them. ... There are plenty of ox-demons and snake spirits in society! Not all Chinese people believe in ghosts, and there is nothing to fear about such performances. Many young people do not know what ox-demons and snake-spirits are, so they should watch some of these for educational purposes.

An admirer of Li, Mao in the 1960s frequently used this term to refer to reactionary elements and those he deemed class enemies. On 12 August 1966 at the Eleventh Plenary Session of the 8th Central Committee of the Chinese Communist Party, Mao told the Standing Committee that there were ox demons and venomous spirits sitting among them and that "to rebel is justified".

In her first public speech in June 1964 at a Peking Opera convention, Jiang Qing criticized regional opera troupes for glorifying emperors, generals, scholars, and other ox-demons and snake-spirits.

During the Cultural Revolution, the phrase (which in classical usage had focused on referring to illusions) became more clearly pejorative. In 1966, after Chen Boda (the leader of the Cultural Revolution Group) took over the official newspaper of the Central Committee of the Chinese Communist Party, People's Daily, an editorial titled Sweep Away All Cow Demons and Snake Spirits (横扫一切牛鬼蛇神) published on June 1, 1966, called for a nationwide struggle against these elements.

The term described those who were deemed class enemies. The exact definition of the term (like most things in the Cultural Revolution) was unclear and subject to interpretation, but the major enemies of the Cultural Revolution were:

- Five Black Categories – Landlords, rightists, rich farmers, counter revolutionaries, and "bad elements"
- Capitalist roaders
- Stinking Old Ninths (intellectuals)
- Hanjian (traitors)

Red Guard art often used the slogan "Sweep Away All Ox-Demons and Snake-Spirits", frequently with imagery of brooms. Brooms were traditional weapons or tools of spirit mediums.
