= Daxing Massacre =

1966 mass murder by Mao Zedong's Red Guards

- Part of Cultural Revolution in China
- Native name: 大兴屠杀
- Location: Daxing District, Beijing, China
- Date: 27 August 1966; August – September 1966
- Target: "Five Black Categories" (Landlords, wealthy peasants, bad influences/elements, right wingers)
- Attack type: Classicide, politicide
- Deaths: 325 (Official statistics)
- Victims: landlords, property owners, "class enemies", suspected civilians
- Perpetrators: Chinese Communist Party, student Red Guards incited by Mao Zedong
- Motive: Destruction of the "Four Olds (Old cultures, old customs, old habits and ideas) and "Five Black Categories" (Landlords, wealthy peasants, bad influences/elements and "right wingers")

The Daxing Massacre (Chinese: 大兴屠杀; pinyin: Dàxīng túshā), also known as the Daxing Incident (大兴事件), was part of the Red August massacre in Beijing during the early Cultural Revolution. It took place in Daxing District of Beijing from August 27 to 31, primarily targeting members of the so-called "Five Black Categories". In total, 325 people were killed in the massacre by September 1, 1966; the oldest killed was 80 years old, while the youngest was only 38 days old; 22 families were wiped out.

The Daxing Massacre occurred after Mao Zedong publicly supporting Red Guards' movement in Beijing and Xie Fuzhi, the Minister of Ministry of Public Security, ordering to protect the Red Guards and not arrest them; on August 26, 1966, the day before the massacre began, Xie stated that it was not incorrect for the Red Guards to beat "bad people", and it was fine if the "bad people" were killed. Methods of torture and slaughter during the Daxing massacre included beating, whipping, strangling, trampling, and beheading; in particular, the method used to kill most infants and children were knocking them against the ground or slicing them in halves.

== See also ==
- Red August
- Red Terror
- Massacres during the Cultural Revolution
