= Poor and lower-middle peasants =

Maoist term

Poor and lower-middle peasants (simplified Chinese: 贫下中农; traditional Chinese: 貧下中農; pinyin: pín xià-zhōng nóng) was a term first used by Mao Zedong in 1955.

During the early years of the People's Republic, people in China were classified into different classes according to their economic conditions. The class system played a significant role in their lives. In the countryside, the members of the classes of Poor and Lower-middle peasants were the majority. They belonged to the Five Red Categories and were favored and supported by the Chinese Communist Party (CCP).

== Poor peasants ==
Poor peasants (贫农; pínnóng) owned limited or no land and incomplete tools. Generally, they rented land for farming and were subject to land rent, debt interest, and a small amount of hired labor.

== Lower-middle peasants ==
Middle peasants normally owned small plots of land and had tools, which allowed them to be somewhat self-sufficient. They generally neither hired workers people nor worked for others.

Lower-middle peasants (下中农; xiàzhōngnóng) are the poorer part of this group. Some supplemented their income by renting land or worked as part-time laborers.

== Five red categories ==
The Five Red Categories (Chinese: 红五类; pinyin: Hóngwǔlèi) during the Chinese Cultural Revolution (1966–1976) were social classes favored by the CCP, as opposed to the Five Black Categories that were classified as potential threats. In the beginning of the Cultural Revolution, Red Guards were allowed to come only from the Five Red Categories, which included:

- Poor and lower-middle peasants (贫下中农; pín xiàzhōngnóng)
- Workers (工人; gōngrén)
- Revolutionary soldiers (革命军人; gémìng jūnrén) within the People's Liberation Army
- Revolutionary cadres (革命干部; gémìng gànbù) who are active members of the CCP in good standing
- Revolutionary martyrs (革命烈士; gémìng lièshì), including immediate family, children, grandchildren (if any) and relatives of deceased CCP members and PLA service personnel killed in action

== Down to the countryside movement ==
The Down to the Countryside Movement was a policy instituted in the People's Republic of China between mid-1950s and 1978. In total, approximately 17 million youths were sent to mountainous areas or farming villages for re-education by the poor and lower-middle peasants there.

Many fresh high school graduates, the so-called sent-down youth, were forced out of the cities and effectively exiled to remote areas of China. Many of them lived there for years. Some commentators considered these people, many of whom lost the opportunity to attend university, "China's Lost Generation". CCP general secretary Xi Jinping was among the sent-down youth.

== Poor and lower-middle peasants' association ==
The Chinese National Poor and Lower-Middle Peasants' Association (Chinese: 中华全国贫下中农协会; pinyin: zhōnghuá quánguó pín xiàzhōngnóng xiéhuì) was created in 1964 as a successor of Chinese Peasants' Association, and dissolved de facto in 1986.

== See also ==
- Five Red Categories
- Five Black Categories
- Stinking Old Ninth
- Cultural revolution
