= Experimental High School Attached to Beijing Normal University =

Public school in Beijing, China

Coordinates: 39.9113°N 116.3683°E

The Experimental High School Attached to Beijing Normal University
- 北京师范大学附属实验中学

Location
- No.14, Erlong Road, Xicheng District; Beijing, 100032; China

Information
- Type: Public
- Motto: 诚信 严谨 求是 拓新 (Honesty; Prudence; Truth-seeking; Pioneering)
- Established: 1917
- Principal: Li Xiaohui (李晓辉)
- Staff: About 300
- Enrollment: About 4000
- Colors: White, black, red
- Website: sdsz.com.cn

Experimental High School Attached to Beijing Normal University
- Simplified Chinese: 北京师范大学附属实验中学
- Traditional Chinese: 北京師範大學附屬實驗中學
- Literal meaning: Beijing Normal University-affiliated Experimental Secondary School
Transcriptions
Standard Mandarin
- Hanyu Pinyin: Běijīng Shīfàn Dàxué fùshǔ Shíyàn Zhōngxué

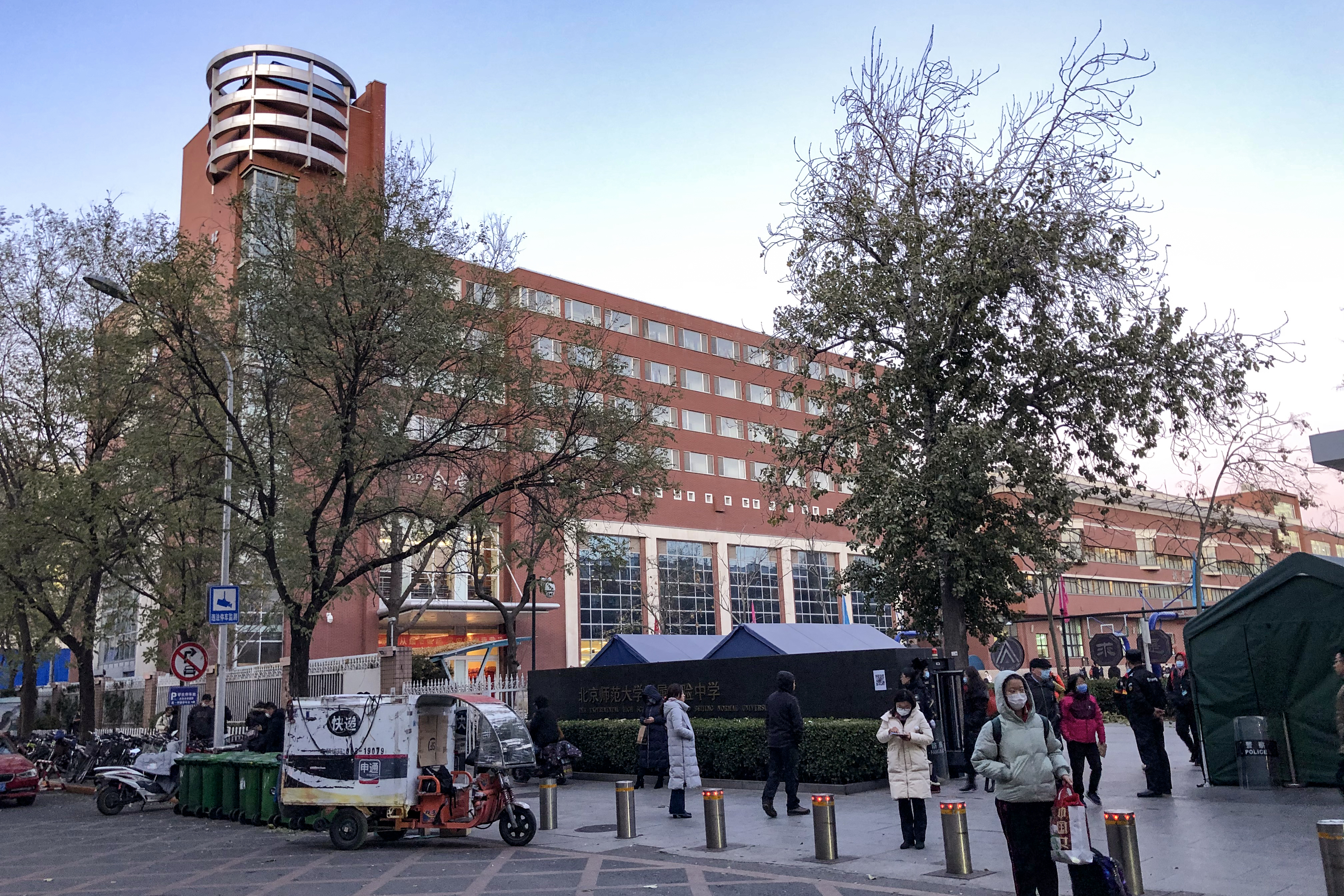
South campus

The Experimental High School Attached to Beijing Normal University (Chinese: 北京师范大学附属实验中学; pinyin: Běijīng shīfàn dàxué fùshǔ shíyàn zhōngxué) is a public secondary school in Xicheng, Beijing, China. The school is supervised by the Beijing City Xicheng District Education Committee.

The school was founded in 1917 as the Girls' Middle School Attached to Beijing Girls' Normal School (北京女子师范学校附属中学). It was integrated in 1931 to Beijing Normal University and renamed Girls' Middle School Attached to Beijing Normal University (北京师范大学附属女子中学). In 1968, boys were admitted to the school for the first time, and in 1978, the school was renamed to its current title.

The school is known for being the site of the torture and murder of Bian Zhongyun, a deputy principal who was killed during a struggle session just thirteen days before her student, Song Binbin, adorned an armband on Mao Zedong at the 8-18 rally during Red August. Bian is considered as one of the first victims of the Cultural Revolution.

== Alumni ==
- Li Ne, daughter of Mao Zedong
- Deng Nan, daughter of Deng Xiaoping
- Deng Rong, daughter of Deng Xiaoping
- Zhou Bingde, niece of 1st Premier Zhou Enlai
- Ye Xiangzhen, daughter of Ye Jianying
- Yu Huisheng, daughter of Huang Jing
- Song Binbin, senior leader in the Chinese Red Guards, daughter of Eight Elders member Song Renqiong
- Wang Youqin, East Asian studies and professor at the University of Chicago

== See also ==
- Beacon high schools in Beijing
- List of schools in Xicheng District
- The Second High School Attached to Beijing Normal University
- Red Guards
