= Wang Youqin =

Chinese scholar of East Asian studies

- 王友琴
- Born: 1952 (age 72–73); Beijing, China
- Education: Peking University; Chinese Academy of Social Sciences
- Known for: research on the Cultural Revolution
- Notable work: Victim of the Cultural Revolution --An Investigative Account of Persecution, Imprisonment and Murder
- Website: ywang.uchicago.edu ccrhm.org

Wang Youqin
- Simplified Chinese: 王友琴
Transcriptions
Standard Mandarin
- Hanyu Pinyin: Wáng Yǒu Qín
- Wade–Giles: wang^{2} you^{3}qin^{2}

Wang Youqin (Chinese: 王友琴; born 1952) is a Chinese scholar specializing in East Asian studies and is currently a professor at the University of Chicago. Wang is notable for her research on the Chinese Cultural Revolution, especially the Red August of Beijing. She is known for her research on the cultural revolution and compilation of lists of victims of the Cultural Revolution and their stories.

== Early life and education ==
Wang was born in Beijing in 1952. After graduating from the Experimental High School Attached to Beijing Normal University, she was among the "educated youths" who were "sent down" to Yunnan Province during the Chinese Cultural Revolution. In 1979, she attended Peking University after Gaokao was resumed in 1977. In 1988, she obtained her PhD in Literature from the Chinese Academy of Social Sciences, and then left for the United States.

== Research on the Cultural Revolution ==
Wang taught Chinese in Stanford University before moving to the University of Chicago in 1999. She is currently a Senior Instructional Professor in Chinese Language at the University of Chicago's Department of the East Asian Languages and Civilizations.

Professor Wang was among the first scholars to study the Red August of Beijing, the origin of the "Red Terror" of the Chinese Cultural Revolution, during which students attacked and even killed their teachers. This included the well-known murder of Bian Zhongyun, who was the first education worker in Beijing killed by Red Guards, including Bian's own students such as Song Binbin. Professor Wang has published papers and books about the individual victims of the Cultural Revolution. She also keeps an online record of hundreds of the victims and their families.

== Major works ==
- Victims of the Cultural Revolution: Testimonies of China's Tragedy, Oneworld Publications, 2023. Chinese Version of the book was published by Open Magazine in May 2004

== See also ==
- Red Terror
- Four Olds
- Red August
- Culture Revolution
- Song Binbin
- Bian Zhongyun
