= Morning Sun (film) =

- DVD cover
- Written by: Carma Hinton; Geremie Barmé; John Crowley
- Directed by: Carma Hinton; Geremie Barmé; Richard Gordon
- Country of origin: United States
- Original languages: English; Mandarin

Production
- Producers: Carma Hinton; Geremie Barmé; Richard Gordon
- Editor: David Carnochan
- Running time: 117 minutes

Original release
- Release: 2003

Morning Sun (Chinese: 八九点钟的太阳; pinyin: Bā Jiǔ Diǎn Zhōng de Tàiyáng) is a 2003 documentary film by Carma Hinton about the Cultural Revolution in China.

The film uses archival and propaganda footage from the era as well as interviews with Red Guard participants and victims to explore the events and effects of the Cultural Revolution.

In the United States, the film garnered largely positive reviews. It won the American Historical Association John E. O'Connor Film Award in 2004 and was nominated or a finalist in regards to a handful of other awards and film festivals.

However, Wang Youqin, researcher of the Cultural Revolution and author of Victims of the Cultural Revolution: Testimonies of China's Tragedy, criticised the film for allegedly ignoring evidence that ran counter to its favourable narrative of the Red Guards.

== See also ==
- List of documentary films about the People's Republic of China
