= Ai Xiaoming =

Chinese filmmaker

- 艾晓明
- Born: November 1953 (age 72); Wuhan, China
- Known for: Documentary Filmmaker
- Notable work: Village Taishi, Why are Flowers so Red, Jiabiangou Elegy
- Awards: Simone de Beauvoir Prize for Women's Freedom
- Website: https://x.com/ai_xiaoming

Ai Xiaoming (Chinese: 艾晓明; pinyin: Ài Xiǎomíng; born 1953) is a Chinese documentary filmmaker, feminist scholar and political activist. She is also a scholar of women's and public issues, and former professor at Sun Yat-sen University. Ai was born in Wuhan in 1953, and has spent most of her adult life in Beijing and Guangzhou.

Ai Xiaoming and Guo Jianmei won the 2010 Simone de Beauvoir Prize for Women's Freedom.

== Early life and education ==
Ai Xiaoming was born in 1953 in the city of Wuhan with a name meaning 'bright dawn', a name typical of the period to show reverence to the new Party government. Her grandfather was Tang Shengzhi, a prominent Kuomintang general in the Second Sino-Japanese War and responsible for the defence of Nanjing.

Despite Tang's affiliation with the Kuomintang administration, the family was relatively privileged, and Ai's father worked as an English teacher.

At the age of twelve, as the Cultural Revolution swept through the country, Ai's family was caught up in the violence. Her grandfather was arrested and imprisoned - where he would later die at the age of 81. Ai's parents were both denounced for their relationship, beaten and sentenced to menial labour. Ai was pressured into denouncing her parents and eventually joined a local band of Red Guards to distance herself from her family.

In 1969, Ai Xiaoming was denied entry to high school because of her relation to 'counter-revolutionaries' and was instead sent to the rural countryside to practice vocational skills.

In 1974, as the party was beginning to launch broad rehabilitation campaigns, Ai was admitted to Central China Normal University in Wuhan based on her relation to former officials. At university she would heavily study literature. During this time, she was forbidden from joining the Chinese Communist Party because of her past - but was eventually allowed membership in 1984, as the party opened up in the relatively liberal 1980s.

Upon graduation, Ai moved to Beijing to work on a PhD in Chinese Literature at Beijing Normal University and became the first woman to obtain a PhD in literature after the Cultural Revolution.

== Political awakening ==
Despite an initial apathy, towards the end of the 1989 Tiananmen protests she visited and brought blankets for the protesters. Ai's political awakening was influenced by the massacre that followed.

Following this, she stopped pursuing a career at an institution as closely tied to the Chinese Communist Party's political structure as Beijing Normal University and accepted a job in the relatively liberal Guangzhou at Zhongshan University.

In the fall of 1999 and spring of 2000, she spent a sabbatical year teaching at The University of the South in Sewanee, Tennessee. In her early career, Ai was an accomplished writer and translator, writing several books on literature and translating the works of Milan Kundera, as well as editing others.

Her experience in an American Liberal Arts college has had a major impact on her political activism. When she returned to China, for example, she translated The Vagina Monologues into Chinese and had her students perform it.

== Documentary filmmaking and activism ==
In 2003, Ai Xiaoming began to make documentary films after an encounter with the documentarian Hu Jie. Ai collaborated with Hu on her first film which documented her staging of the Vagina Monologues at her university. She explained in interviews that she wanted to use film to break through shame, expose injustice, promote social awareness and make visible things that are not normally spoken about.

In the early 2000s, the popularity of handheld video cameras enabled Ai to produce her documentary films in the field, and generally made the production of documentaries more accessible and affordable.

In 2005, Ai Xiaoming produced Village Taishi (太石村), a documentary that focused on the democratic push in the Guangdong village of Taishi to recall the appointed village head. This film was an early example of her style of documentary filmmaking. Ai was deeply involved in the community but shot the film in an observational style without overarching narration and discussion. Despite this observational style, Ai considers herself as deeply involved in the activism that she documents, describing in an interview her filming as a form of "participatory action". Expanding on that she stated that "when [her] collaborators experience the misfortune of imprisonment, I don't remain silent or regard them as nothing more than subjects for filming. I make public appeals for their release."

In 2008, Ai was an initial signatory to the Charter 08 manifesto that was drawn up and circulated by Liu Xiaobo and called for moderate political and civil rights for Chinese citizens. The next year she wrote to authorities requesting to withdraw her membership from the Chinese Communist Party.

The 2008 Sichuan earthquake tragedy has a significant effect on Ai Xiaoming, and she travelled to the site quickly following the disaster where she, and other citizen investigators and independent filmmakers, sought to document aspects of the disaster that official directives forbid more traditional journalists from covering. Ai would end up producing three documentary films on the disaster, relying heavily on an observational style, interviews with affected individuals and the heavy incorporation of dramatic - and sometimes highly graphic - footage recorded by eyewitnesses. These documentaries would be seminal to the development of Chinese independent documentary filmmaking, and moved beyond simply documenting events to actively seeking social change.

One film, Our Children (我们的娃娃) which Ai co-produced with Hu Jie was particularly activist, directly contrasting footage and accounts of children's deaths in the disaster with official reports, highlighting the inconsistencies between the official rhetoric and the actual situation on the ground in northern Sichuan.

In 2010, Ai won the Simone de Beauvoir Prize for her film Why are Flowers so Red (花为什么这么红), another of her films on the 2008 Sichuan Earthquake.

During this period of increased notoriety following the earthquake, Ai Xioaming was more heavily restricted by authorities. Authorities refused to renew her passport preventing her from travelling to Paris to accept the Simone de Beaurvoir price, and also from attending a documentary film festival in Hong Kong.

Ai has criticised the Chinese government's national policy of compulsory IUDs for women who have already given birth to a child. She has said that many women, herself included, had never been advised of potential complications and the requirement for regular checkups.

In 2013, Ai protested topless with her body covered in calligraphy protesting the government's inaction on Twitter in response to the rape of six schoolgirls by the school's principal and a local official in Hainan. She stated that her nude protest was inspired by Ai Weiwei.

Ai Xiaoming's 2017 film Jiabiangou Elegy: Life and Death of the Rightists (夹边沟祭事) was a foray into historical documentation. The film centres on recording the testimony of survivors from the Jiabiangou labour camp that operated in Gansu during the Great Leap Forward famine. The camp was a punishment during the Anti-Rightist Campaign, and an estimated 80% of the 3,000 detainees starved at the camp. Following the camp's closure, officials tried to cover-up the deaths at the site and survivors were only offered menial compensation for their suffering. Ai's film aimed to record and document detailed testimony from these survivors before they died, and to document continued attempts to commemorate the victims. Her film ties together the themes of past suffering and continued repression and emphasises how the suppression of historic truths remains a significant issue in modern China.

Ai's films are banned in China.

== COVID-19 outbreak ==
Ai Xiaoming was living in her home in Wuhan during the initial COVID-19 outbreak, and was placed under lockdown along with the rest of the city in late January 2020. Ai was initially frustrated by the lack of official information surrounding the outbreak. Ai took part in the initial social mobilisation in response to the outbreak and helped organised supplies and 600,000 yuan in donations to local health officials. Appalled by the lack of supplies and provision by the government, she published her observations online.

Her first article focused on Dr. Li Wenliang, a health-care worker who alerted colleagues of the severity of the outbreak and was initially punished by officials before dying of the virus himself in early February. When Li died, Ai reacted in her journal simply with calligraphy of the character Xun (训) meaning 'teach' or 'admonish'. This wordplay was in reference to the letter of admonishment Li was forced to sign, and also as moral guidance for speaking the truth.

This post exemplified Ai's multi-modal style of journaling, which was described by the Los Angeles Review of Books as a "smorgasbord of literary and visual forms", even including a play written in text through the diary. The online journal took the form of a "counter-diary", and Ai offered meandering thoughts and analysis on the medium throughout.

During the outbreak, Ai provided accommodation to the citizen journalist and lawyer Zhang Zhan at one of her properties in Wuhan. Zhang would later be arrested, tortured and sentenced to 4-years imprisonment for her citizen journalism around the outbreak.

Ai's father died from illness during the lockdown. She made the decision to care for him at home, as hospitals at the time were overwhelmed and dangerous. Ai saw her father's death as an example of the "collateral damage" caused by the pandemic and the government's mishandling of the outbreak. Ai and her family held a funeral for her father two days before the city banned funerals.

Her WeChat account was shut down by authorities in late March. Ai has faced significant restrictions since her activism during the COVID-19 outbreak, being described in 2020 as being virtually under house arrest.

== Filmography ==
Since 2004, she has made more than two dozen films, including documentaries about citizen activism, social problems, and corruption. Some of her films aim to uncover whitewashed historical events.

Year	Title	Length	Description
2004	The White Ribbon (白丝带 Bai Sidai)	57 minutes	
2005	Garden of Paradise (天堂花园Tiantang Huayuan)	140 minutes	A documentary about the changes taking place in China between 2003 and 2005 in terms of respect and protection of human rights. Ai co-directed with Hu Jie.
2005	The Village Taishi (太石村 Taishi Cun)	100 minutes	Recounts the struggle of the villagers of Taishi against local authorities in 2005.
2006	The Epic of the Great Plains (中原纪事 Zhongyuan Jishi)	140 minutes	A documentary film about the fate of villagers infected with HIV who, because of their poverty, had sold their blood. The courage they have shown in this situation is contrasted with official corruption.
2006	Sexuality, Gender, and Rights in Asia (Xing Xing Yu Quan Li Bie)	46 minutes	
2007	The House of Care and Love (关爱之家 Guan'ai Zhi Jia)	108 minutes	A documentary on people infected with HIV after receiving a blood transfusion. It focuses on the case of Liu Xiaohong, a villager from Xingtai in Hebei, who was contaminated during childhood. Ai co-directed with Hu Jie.
2008	The Train that Leads to My House (Kaiwang Jiaxiang of Lieche)	59 minutes	A documentary describing the plight of migrants, following the disruption of rail traffic on the Beijing-Guangzhou line, after winter weather.
2009	Our Children (我们的娃娃 Women de Wawa)	73 minutes	One of three documentaries about the 2008 earthquake in Sichuan and its impact on the population, especially in the scandal of corruption in school construction.
2009	A Citizen Survey (公民调查 Gongmin Diaocha)	64 minutes	One of three documentaries about the 2008 earthquake in Sichuan and its impact on the population, especially in the scandal of corruption in school construction.
2010	Why are Flowers so Red (花为什么这么红 Hua Weishenme Zheme Hong)	116 minutes	One of three documentaries about the 2008 earthquake in Sichuan and its impact on the population, especially in the scandal of corruption in school construction.
2011	Postcard (明信片 Míngxìnpiàn)	43 minutes	A film about Chinese civil rights activist Wang Lihong.
2012	Wukan Three Days (乌坎三日 Wūkǎn Sān Rì)	100 minutes	A documentary that explores the events surrounding the Wukan protests in Guangdong Province, China, in 2011.
2014	New Citizen's Trial (新公民案审判 Xīn Gōngmín àn Shěnpàn)	57 minutes	A documentary that chronicles the trial and legal struggles of prominent Chinese activists associated with the New Citizens' Movement (新公民运动), a grassroots campaign advocating for greater transparency, social justice, and constitutional governance in China.
2017	Jiabiangou Elegy: Life and Death of the Rightists (夹边沟祭事 Jiābiān gōu jìshì)	375 minutes	A documentary that explores the history and legacy of the Jiabiangou labour camp in Gansu province.
