= Newborn socialist things =

Political term from Mao-era China

Newborn socialist things (simplified Chinese: 社会主义新生事物; traditional Chinese: 社會主義新生事物; pinyin: shèhuìzhǔyì xīnshēng shìwù) is a Maoist political and cultural term popularized during the Cultural Revolution to refer to harbingers of a progressive future which emerge in the present. The term is used in reference to both physical objects, such as commodities produced under a socialist mode of production, as well as new political concepts. Also referred to as newborn things under socialism, newborn things were in contrast to "old things" such as the Four Olds.

== Definition ==
The term newborn socialist things refers to a harbinger of a communist future which emerges in the present. In 1959, Chinese Communist Party theorist Sun Dingguo defined newborn things as those which pass a four-part test. They must (1) struggle against "old things," (2) forge their own path, (3) accord with socialist developmental principles, and (4) have a long and bright future. Under Sun's view, it was necessary for something to "earn" the "right" to be called a newborn thing.

A key element of the term is its relation to forward historical progress. Newborn socialist things were said to herald the eventual transition to commodity-free communism and to serve as a sign of this "officially recognized future."

In addition to the technical political sense, the term newborn things is also used in a colloquial sense to refer to emerging phenomena.

== Specific newborn things ==
The concept of newborn things frequently included commodities produced under socialism or other physical objects like art. Peasant paintings created during the Cultural Revolution, for example, were considered a newborn thing because art in China had not previously reflected the experiences of peasants or workers. Revolutionary operas (yangbanxi) in both recorded form and live production were another prominent example.

In addition to physical objects, newborn things included political developments. In his essay On the Correct Handling of Contradictions Among the People, Mao Zedong described agricultural communes as a newborn thing. Red Guard publications often couched activities like forming new groups in terms of their support for newborn things and their opposition to the Four Olds.

== Academic analysis ==
Academic Laurence Coderre describes the significance of newborn things in Mao-era discourse as follows:

Newborn things' struggle with old things was particularly crucial to the creation of a developmental dialectic whereby the struggle itself would help pave the way for ever newer -- and therefore more advanced -- newborn things. Indeed, this evolutionary process was ultimately rooted in the notion of planned obsolescence. Newborn feudalist things inevitably became old things under capitalism; newborn capitalist things became the object of socialist struggle; and one day, with the arrival of the communist Promised Land, even newborn socialist things would become dangerously outdated.

== See also ==
- Ideology of the Chinese Communist Party
- Four Olds
