= Though I Am Gone =

- Traditional Chinese: 我雖死去
- Simplified Chinese: 我虽死去
- Hanyu Pinyin: Wǒ suī sǐ qù
- Directed by: Hu Jie
- Written by: Hu Jie
- Cinematography: Hu Jie
- Edited by: Hu Jie
- Music by: In the Taihang Mountains
- Distributed by: dGenerate Films
- Release date: 2007
- Running time: 68 minutes
- Country: China
- Language: Mandarin Chinese

Though I Am Gone (Chinese: 我虽死去; pinyin: Wǒ suī sǐ qù) is a 2007 Chinese documentary film directed, written, and edited by Hu Jie. The film centers on Bian Zhongyun, the vice principal of the Girls Middle School attached to Beijing Normal University, who was beaten to death by her students on August 5, 1966 during the Red August of Chinese Cultural Revolution. The film is being distributed in North America by dGenerate Films.

== Background ==
The Great Leap Forward of 1958-1960 launched by Mao Zedong was meant to increase output within China by means of faster working, longer working hours, and leaving aside conventional methods of production. However, this was a failure, as agriculture and industry collapsed and caused one of the largest famines in Chinese history which killed 20 to 30 million people. The Red Guard movement was born out of Mao’s reaction to the frustrations of the Great Leap Forward.

In 1966, through Mao’s guidance, the young people of China rose against teachers and elders, in order to have old values, attitudes, and behaviours eliminated as well as spread socialism around the world. The Red Guards were a student military formed from millions of students, high school and university, who travelled around China to boycott classes, denounce teachers, and change the roles in the running of schools, offices, and neighbourhoods, leading to many people being killed. The movement spread from within the party to the entire country and shortly after, the members of the society began to worry.

== Plot summary ==
The film is largely based on interviews with the deceased woman's husband, Wang Jingyao. Jingyao documented the events leading up to and following his wife's death, including photos of her corpse, using a small 35mm stills camera. He did not take down the slanderous writing that the students wrote when they broke in to preserve it to show the truth of the events. Before August 5, 1966, Bian had been beaten by students, but when Wang suggested she leave Beijing, she refused to lose her dignity, also believing herself to be innocent. On August 5, 1966, Wang did not witness Bian’s fatal beating. Although heartbroken by the incident, Wang brought a camera the next day and took pictures of her body in order to record the truth.

The film shows the hidden perspectives, experiences and memories that are buried deeply within normal Chinese citizens during the Maoist periods and the Cultural Revolution through the use of personal and subjective records. The film also illustrates the scale of the terror that was unleashed by listing the 201 names on the screen at the end of film, in a four-minute incomplete roll call of the teachers that were killed in Beijing, China during the August 1966 Cultural Revolution. The list of names act as a reminder to the audience about the wrongful murderous killings by the Red Guards that was encouraged and permitted by Mao during the movement and also to pay respect to those who have tragically died in the violent revolution.

== Production ==
In an interview with director Hu Jie, the filmmaker stated that it "took a year of negotiations and a viewing of the Lin Zhao film (referring to Hu's 2004 film Searching for Lin Zhao's Soul) to persuade Bian's aging husband to tell his story and show his photographs for the first time". The film uses a combination of black and white and colour shots. Through the interviewers' narration and perspective, the film gradually uncovers the real events that occurred in the Cultural Revolution at that time. The cinematography technique also objectively reveals the emotions of the autobiographical nature through the narrator's perspective and vision. The documentary uses a variety of historical materials, including photographs, dazibao posters, newspaper clippings, and archival footage. the materials are combined with Wang Jingyao’s testimony to help reconstruct the events surrounding Bian Zhongyun’s death. The film have both personal memories with documentary evidence to preserve the history of Bian Zhongyun's death and the early Cultural Revolution. In the whole interviews, photographs, and archival materials, it records events that might otherwise be forgotten.

=== Title ===
The title of the film is derived from a poem in Doctor Zhivago (1957) that was written by the Russian author Boris Pasternak (1890–1960). The last two excepts of Gethsemane's Garden from The Poems of Doctor Zhivago as translated by Christopher Barns:

To suffer and descend into the grave.

And from the grave on the third day I'll rise.
Then, like a fleet of barges down the stream,
The centuries will float forth from the night

And make their way before my judgment seat.

我虽死去

但三日之后就要复活
仿佛那水流急湍
世世代代将走出黑暗

承受我的审判

Not only does the name derive from the poem, but it also serves as a metaphor that although the event is over, the memory and tragedy remain.

=== Symbolic Significance ===
This documentary has a representative symbolic significance of the camera held by Wang Jingyao: the incorporation of the documentary photos taken by Wang Jingyao.

Jie Li describes the film as a remediation of Wang Jingyao's private archive of Bian Zhongyun's death. According to Li, Wang bought a camera after Bian's death to photograph her body, the big-character posters in the family apartment, and other traces of the violence. Li argues that Hu Jie later transformed this private collection, together with Wang's oral testimony, into a documentary that gave the photographs a wider public audience as visual testimony to Red Guard violence.

== Reception ==
=== Ban in China ===
Although the nature and circumstances surrounding Bian's death are well-known in China and have been the subject of much public debate in the decades following the film's release, the Communist Party reacted sensitively to the film because "many of the former members of the Red Guard who attended Bian's middle school were members of the families of high-ranking officials that are still revered today." At the time Bian served as vice principal, students of the school included the children of several influential party members, with notable examples being the daughters of Liu Shaoqui, Deng Xiaoping, and Chairman Mao. The film has been banned in China in connection with the political sensitivity of Bian's death, the unresolved question of responsibility for Red Guard violence, and the case's connection to prominent political families.

Jie Li further notes that the film was produced without support from official institution or private enterprises and circulated outside both state and market systems; its inclusion in Yunfest 2007, a major Chinese documentary festival, led to the cancellation of the event and increased the film's reputation through censorship.

=== Critical reception ===
Scholar Jie Li discusses "Though I Am Gone" within Hu Jie's broader body of Cultural Revolution documentaries, describing these films as "virtual museums of forbidden memories". Li argues that the film preserves the memory of Bian Zhongyun's death by combining Wang Jingyao's photographs, personal testimony, historical footage, and material evidence.

"One of the Cultural Revolution's most shocking and perplexing cases. We can only imagine how difficult it is for Hu to produce his films; only a committed person who takes what he does as a 'calling' can persist." — Dr. Weili Yu, Yale University, in the journal Asian Educational Media Service

"Though none of his works have been publicly shown in China, Hu Jie is one of his country's most noteworthy filmmakers." — The New York Review of Books

"A profoundly moving memorial to the victims of Mao's senseless political violence." — ReelTime Arts

"Packs a powerful punch in just over an hour...Director Hue Jie exploys a collage-like approach, interspersing archival footage and propaganda songs with present day interviews with Wang and other survivors of this tragic period of history." — Twitch Film

"Though I Am Gone challenges the authorities; the mainland may have sanctioned other films which broach the so-called '10 years of catastrophe' but Hu's film is still banned." — South China Morning Post

"Hu Jie's body of work puts a human face on some of the worst horrors of the Communist Party's recent history." — Public Radio International

== About the Director ==
‘’Though I Am Gone’’ was written, photographed and directed by Hu Jie. Born in 1958 he joined the People’s Liberation Army in 1977 and served for fifteen years, obtaining the rank of captain in the air force, before becoming an oil painter in the People’s Liberation Army Arts College. He later worked at Xihua News Agency until leaving in 1999 to become am independent film maker.

Scholars have suggested that Hu’s background within state institutions, and military and state media helps lend weight to his documentaries on state violence during the Cultural Revolution. As according to Jie Li, Hu “turned from painting to documentary film as are presentational mode that can do greater justice to memorialize those who perished,” producing ‘’Though I Am Gone’’ without support public institutions and circulating his film independent of state media. Li also notes that at the end of his film Hu only lists his own name in the credits stating “taking sole responsibility for such a potentially risky initiative” so that those who assisted him with the research and filming process could remain anonymous and protected from any backlash.

== Screenings and awards ==
| Festival | Award | Year |
|---|---|---|
| Chinese Documentary Film Festival | Champion | 2008 |
| Melbourne International Film Festival | Official Selection | 2012 |

=== Cancellation of YunFest ===
The film was scheduled to be screened at YunFest, a documentary festival in Yunnan Province , in 2007, but the event was cancelled at the last minute after official pressure. Evan Osnos later reported in The New Yorker that authorities had pressured organizers to postpone the festival, which later convened and screened the film in another city in Yunnan.
