= Five Red Categories =

Chinese socioeconomic classes for affirmative action during the Cultural Revolution

The "Five Red Categories" (Chinese: 红五类; pinyin: Hóngwǔlèi) during the Chinese Cultural Revolution (1966–1976) were the social classes favoured by the Chinese Communist Party (CCP), as opposed to the Five Black Categories that were classified as potential threats or enemies. In the beginning of the Cultural Revolution, Red Guards were only allowed to come from the "Five Red Categories". These included:

- Poor and lower-middle peasants (贫下中农; pín xiàzhōngnóng)
- Workers (工人; gōngrén)
- Revolutionary soldiers (革命军人; gémìng jūnrén) within the People's Liberation Army
- Revolutionary cadres (革命干部; gémìng gànbù) who are active members of the CCP in good standing
- Revolutionary martyrs (革命烈士; gémìng lièshì), including immediate family members, children, grandchildren (if any) and relatives of deceased CCP members and PLA service personnel killed in action

== See also ==
- Five Black Categories
- Stinking Old Ninth
