= Sweep Away All Cow Demons and Snake Spirits =

Chinese words and phrases

- Chinese: 横扫一切牛鬼蛇神
- Origin: People's Daily
- Type: Editorial
- Date: June 1, 1966

Sweep Away All Cow Demons and Snake Spirits
- Traditional Chinese: 橫掃一切牛鬼蛇神
- Simplified Chinese: 横扫一切牛鬼蛇神
- Literal meaning: sweep away all cow demons [and] snake spirits
Transcriptions
Standard Mandarin
- Hanyu Pinyin: Héngsǎo yīqiè níuguǐshéshén

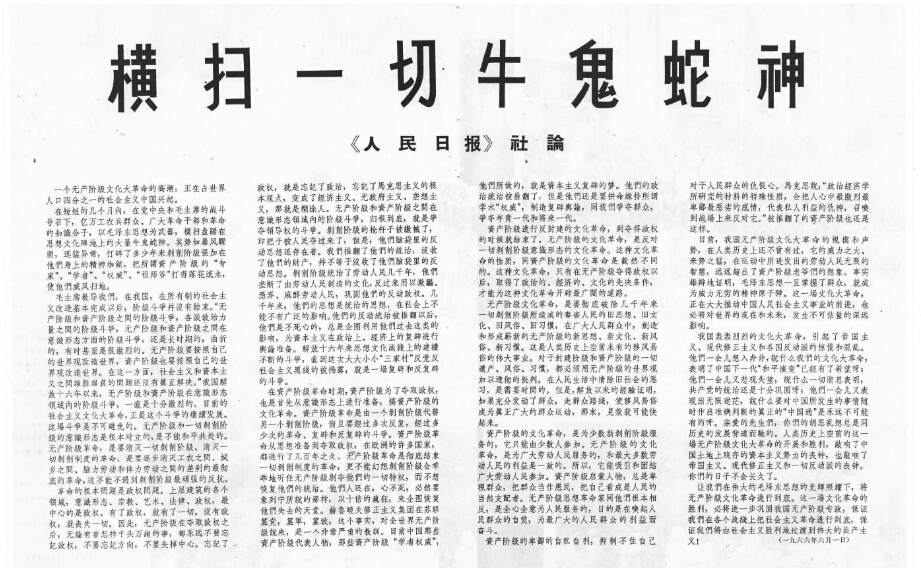
Editorial Sweep Away All Cow Demons and Snake Spirits

Sweep Away All Cow Demons and Snake Spirits (Chinese: 横扫一切牛鬼蛇神), alternatively translated as Obliterate All Ox Demons and Snake Spirits, Sweep Away All Ox-ghosts and Snake-spirits, is an editorial published by the People's Daily on June 1, 1966, calling on the masses to rise up and "sweep away all cow demons and snake spirits".

The editorial declares that "the climax of the Great Proletarian Cultural Revolution is rising in socialist China, which accounts for a quarter of the world's population." It calls on the proletariat to "completely eradicate all the old ideas, old culture, old customs and old habits that have poisoned the people of China for thousands of years, fostered by the exploiting classes."

Cow demons and snake spirits referred to people who were condemned during the Cultural Revolution, including condemned government leaders, intellectuals and cadres. The claim to "sweep away all cow demons and snake spirits" is actually part of the campaign to combat the "Four Olds" and maintain the "Bloodline theory".
