= Bian Zhongyun =

Chinese educator (1916–1966)

- 卞仲耘
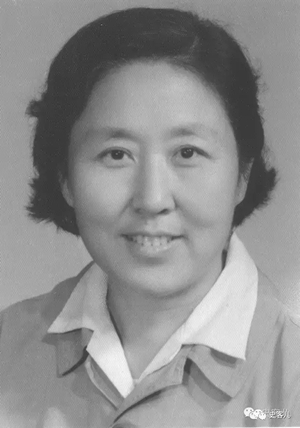
- Bian in 1964
- Born: June 19, 1916; Wuwei, Anhui, China
- Died: August 5, 1966 (aged 50); Xicheng, Beijing
- Cause of death: Murdered by Red Guards
- Occupations: Party secretary, deputy principal
- Employer: Beijing Normal University Female Middle School
- Political party: Chinese Communist Party
- Spouse: Wang Jingyao

Chinese name
- Simplified Chinese: 卞仲耘
- Traditional Chinese: 卞仲耘
Transcriptions
Standard Mandarin
- Hanyu Pinyin: Biàn Zhòngyún
- IPA: [pjɛ̂n ʈʂʊ̂ŋ.y̌n]

Bian Zhongyun (Chinese: 卞仲耘; 19 June 1916 – 5 August 1966) was a deputy principal at the Beijing Normal University Female Middle School (now Experimental High School Attached to Beijing Normal University). She was attracted to the Chinese Communist Party during the Second Sino-Japanese War and joined the party in 1941, and before working for the high school in Beijing, she worked as an editor for People's Daily then located in rural Hebei. During the Red August of 1966, she was beaten to death by the school's female Red Guards, becoming the first educator to be beaten to death in Beijing during the Cultural Revolution.

== Life ==
Bian was raised in Wuwei, Anhui. During the Red August of 1966 that marked the opening of the Cultural Revolution in Beijing, she was among the first victims, being beaten to death with wooden sticks by a group of students, led by local student Red Guard leader Song Binbin. Prior to her death, Bian had been the party leader at the school.

In 1966, Mao had urged young people to rise up against their parents and teachers. Song Binbin and another student, Liu Jin, put up the first poster denouncing teachers at the school.

In March 1966, after an earthquake near Beijing, the school told students that they should run out of the classroom as soon as possible if another earthquake occurred. Red Guard students tested Bian, by asking if they should carry out the portrait of Mao in their classrooms. She did not answer the question directly, only repeating that they should run out of the classroom as soon as possible. She was therefore accused of opposing Mao Zedong. Later, Bian was further denounced as a "counter-revolutionary revisionist" by Song's group of Red Guards.

== Murder ==
Red Guard students broke in to Bian's home, burning her books. They left behind posters threatening to "rip out your dog heart, lop off your dog head". Bian was taken to the school, and subjected to a struggle session. She was beaten, dragged on stage in shackles, and was forced to kneel while she was kicked and beaten with rifles. The students also beat Bian with nailed clubs. She was forced to clean the school toilets and drink from a dirty bucket, after which she passed out and was placed in a rubbish cart and left to die in the sun, foam dripping from her mouth.

== Aftermath ==
Bian's husband, Wang Jingyao, has stated that he was informed by anonymous witnesses that the female students who delivered the final blow did not include Song Binbin, even though Song was the nominal leader of the group. Song has stated that although she was one of the leading Red Guards in the school during the unrest, she did not participate in the killing of Bian Zhongyun. For several decades, witnesses, including Wang and Song, refused to openly name the students who were involved in the killing as they were politically connected individuals.

In 2005, the daughter of Zhang Bojun, a prominent victim of the Cultural Revolution, wrote a book in which she finally named Deng Rong, the youngest daughter of Deng Xiaoping, as one of the perpetrators. In 2012, on his deathbed, Wang Jingyao finally confirmed that the students who delivered the final blow to his wife on 5 August 1966 included Liu Pingping, a daughter of Liu Shaoqi. Ironically, the Deng and Liu families would both become persecuted during the Cultural Revolution.

Professor Wang Youqin, former Experimental High School Attached to Beijing Normal University student, was among the first scholars to study the Red August of Beijing, the origin of the "Red Terror" of the Chinese Cultural Revolution, during which students attacked and even killed their teachers. This included the murder of Bian Zhongyun.

== Legacy ==
A documentary about her, Though I Am Gone, was released in 2006. It claims that Song, a student leader involved in the Red Guards in the school, was sent to the United States to study on government sponsorship and invited back to Beijing Normal University as a prominent alumna. Song's father, Song Renqiong was the mayor of Beijing and a high-ranking member of the Chinese Communist Party, thereby immunising her from any responsibility, direct or indirect, for Bian's death.

== See also ==
- Red Terror
- Wang Youqin
