= Song Renqiong =

Chinese general (1909–2005)

- 宋任穷
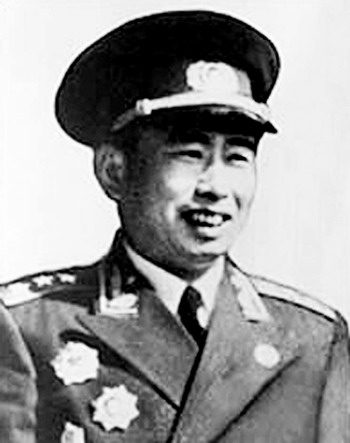

Head of the Organization Department of the Chinese Communist Party
- In office December 1978 – February 1983
- Preceded by: Hu Yaobang
- Succeeded by: Chen Yeping

Vice Chairman of the Central Advisory Commission
- In office September 1985 – October 1992 Serving with Bo Yibo
- Chairman: Deng Xiaoping; Chen Yun

Personal details
- Born: 11 July 1909 Liuyang, Hunan, China
- Died: 8 January 2005 (aged 95) Beijing, China
- Children: 8, including Song Binbin
- Awards: Order of Bayi (First Class Medal); Order of Independence and Freedom (First Class Medal); Order of Liberation (First Class Medal)

Military service
- Branch/service: People's Liberation Army
- Rank: General of People's Liberation Army

Song Renqiong (Chinese: 宋任穷; pinyin: Sòng Rènqióng; Wade–Giles: Sung Jen-ch'iung; 11 July 1909 – 8 January 2005), born Song Yunqin (Chinese: 宋韵琴; pinyin: Sòng Yùnqín), was a general in the People's Liberation Army of the People's Republic of China (PRC) and one of the Eight Elders of the Chinese Communist Party.

== Biography ==
Song Renqiong was born in Liuyang, Hunan Province in 1909 to an impoverished peasant family. He joined both the Communist Youth League of China and the Communist Party in 1926, serving as a local propaganda committee member and CCP branch committee secretary and headed a farmer's union in his native county. In 1927, he joined the Autumn Harvest Uprising and participated in the retreat to the Jinggang Mountains.

In 1934, he participated in the Long March and led the communist forces in the crossing of the Wu River and the capture of Zunyi together with the likes of Chen Geng.

During the Second Sino-Japanese War, he was the vice director of the political department of the 129th Division. Toward the end of the Chinese Civil War, he was the vice political commissar of the Northeastern Field Army. In 1945, he was elected as an alternate member of the Central Committee during the 7th National Congress of the CCP.

After the establishment of the PRC in 1949, he was the secretary of the Chinese Communist Party (CCP)'s committee in Yunnan Province, Vice Secretary of the Southwestern Bureau of the CCP, Vice Secretary-general of the CCP Central Committee, minister of No. 2, No. 3 and No. 7 Mechanical Industry Department, and No. 1 Secretary of the Northeastern Bureau of CCP. He was also the Vice Chairman of the 4th and 5th National Political Consultative Conference. He was an alternative member of the Politburo of the 8th CCP Central Committee, a Secretary of the Central Secretariat of the 11th CCP Central Committee, and a Politburo member of the 12th. Like many of his contemporaries he was purged during the Cultural Revolution and rehabilitated after Mao's death. He was the Vice-Chairman of the Standing Committee of CCP's Central Advisory Commission, serving under Deng Xiaoping and later Chen Yun. Although the commission was in theory a council of retired elders with no official power, members effectively held veto power over major policies and personnel affairs. During the Tiananmen Square protests of 1989, Song was one of the most ardent supporters of Deng, who decided to use violence to crush the student movement. He was one of the influential Chinese leaders during the 80s and is considered to be one of the Eight Elders of the Chinese Communist Party.

Song Renqiong retired from politics after the Central Advisory Commission was abolished in October 1992, and took on the role of Honorary Chairman of the Chinese Volleyball Association, remaining in the position till his death.

== Death ==
He died aged 95, on 8 January 2005 in Beijing, following an illness. Though Song Renqiong had died before Zhao Ziyang, he had requested that his floral wreath and elegiac couplet appear in Zhao's funeral. His funeral was held on 15 January. The highest Chinese officials, including Hu Jintao and Jiang Zemin, attended his funeral. The Chinese state media reported Song as "an outstanding member of the Communist Party, a great Communist soldier, a remarkable proletarian revolutionary and a prominent leader of the party's political work."

== See also ==
- List of officers of the People's Liberation Army

Political offices
| Preceded by none | Secretary of the CCP Yunnan Committee; 1950–1952 | Succeeded by Xie Fuzhi |
| Preceded by Hu Yaobang | Head of Organization Department of the Chinese Communist Party; 1978–1983 | Succeeded by Qiao Shi |
