= Hu Jie =

Chinese filmmaker and artist (born 1958)

Hu Jie (胡杰; born 1958) is a Chinese filmmaker and artist known for the films Searching for Lin Zhao's Soul (2004), Though I Am Gone (2007), and Spark (2013), which constitute a "trilogy of documentaries about Maoist China". Spark received the top prize at the 2014 Taiwan Independent Documentary Festival.

Hu was born in Jinan, Shandong Province, and later attended the People's Liberation Army Arts College before serving in the People's Liberation Army for fifteen years. He then found work with the Xinhua News Agency prior to his debut as a director. He currently resides in Nanjing.

In addition to his work in film, Hu is an accomplished artist of woodblock prints, recently producing a series of pieces depicting scenes from the Great Famine which was intended to be exhibited in Tianjin in 2014 before being deemed too controversial, leading to the showcase's cancellation.

== Life ==
Hu Jie was born in Jinan, east China's Shandong Province in 1958.

He studied traditional Chinese landscape paintings at the age of 15. He graduated from nanjing middle school in jiangsu province in 1975 and became a worker after graduation. He joined the army in 1977 and was in the air force for 15 years.

From 1984 to 1986, he worked as a political instructor at Shanghai air force political college. From 1989 to 1991, he attended the People's Liberation Army Arts College to study oil painting, and then he became a captain of the air force.

In 1994, he worked as a painter in the Yuanmingyuan artist village. In 1995, the first documentary

In 1999, he became a full-time, professional documentary filmmaker.

== Filmography ==
- Yuanmingyuan Artist Village (1994)
  - In the years before 1995, a number of young artists from all over the country came to pursue free and creative work in the villages near yuanmingyuan. These people settled down in the rental houses of the village, then they bought painter to stretch the canvas. They made exploration and creation of art. The documentary records some stories during and after this spring.
- Remote Mountain (1995)
  - In 1995, the documentary film director Hu Jie carrying simple machines, climbed the Qilian mountain in Qinghai province, which is located in ground 3500 meters above sea level. He recorded some fragments stories about local miners’s life. This documentary was later named “Mountains”, which is only 35 minutes.
- The Female Matchmaker (1996)
  - In order to find such a visually inspired matchmaker, the director visited nearly 10 matchmakers and finally selected the matchmaker in the film. The director then followed the matchmaker and witnessed the vicissitudes of life. In addition to the land, there is no form of art that can describe the heaviness of life and emotion.
- The Trash Collector (short, 1998) He collected Japan.
- The Janitors (short, 1998)
- The Construction Workers (short, 1998)
- The Factory Set up by the Peasants (short, 1998)
- Mountain Songs in the Plain (2001)
  - Luo Xiaojia, a girl from the Yi nationality in Yunnan province, was kidnapped and sold to the shandong plain when she was 17 years old. She was forced to marry a young farmer. The film records her family life, her homesickness, and her view of life. When luo Xiaojia came to shandong province in the 10th year later, she finally got the chance to go home. After a journey of 4,000 kilometers, she returned to her hometown Yunnan province, where she saw her mother who cared for her day and night, and her relatives who betrayed her. In the end, her mother sang many songs for her, and with those songs she returned to shandong reluctantly.
- Bask in Sunshine (2002)
  - The film records several artists in Nanjing, China, who have gathered more than 200 artists from other regions to engage in a "sunbathing" modern art activity. They chose private desert island as a place to attract the local investor, so that the activity is very lively.
- On the Seaside (1999-2003)
  - Because of difficulties where they live in the north east of China, a husband and wife go back to their hometown in Shandong Province and settle in their hometown by the sea with three children. With no land of their own, they have to face the sea, and start their life again.
- The vagina monologues: stories from China (2004, with AI Xiaoming)
- Searching for Lin Zhao’s Soul (2004
  - Among the many intellectuals who were classified as rightists in the 1958 anti-rightist movement, Peking University student Lin Zhao was probably the most influential one. She began to resist totalitarian rule and was arrested. After her arrest, she left hundreds of thousands of poems and articles on the wall in blood. In 1968, she was executed during the height of the cultural revolution. In Searching for Lin Zhao’s Soul, the director visited her relatives, and former classmates.
- Painting for the revolution peasants: paintings from Hu County (2005 with AI Xiaoming)
- Taishi Village (2005, with AI Xiaoming)
- Garden in Heaven (2005, with AI Xiaoming)
  - Huang Jing, a female teacher in Hunan Province, was found dead in her dormitory. Her boyfriend was charged with rape, but the judicial authorities did not proceed with the case. This film reveals the important changes that China is experiencing today: the awakening of civic consciousness, women's struggle against judicial corruption and action against sexual violence. According to the director, 'Through this film, I aspired to write the first page of the history of feminist documentary-making in China.'
- Though I am Gone (2006)
  - The widower of one of the first teachers to be murdered during the Cultural Revolution discusses his wife's death and the period afterwards.
- Spark (2013)
  - A documentary about the Great Famine of 1959 in China.
  - Winner of the top prize at the Taiwan Independent Documentary Festival in 2014.
