= National Political Consultative Conference =

National Political Consultative Conference 國民參政會

Type
- Type: Advisory body

History
- Established: July 6, 1938
- Disbanded: March 1948

The National Political Consultative Conference was a political organization of the National Government of the Republic of China. It was the highest national consultative and deliberative body for public opinion, with representatives from the Kuomintang, the Chinese Communist Party, and other anti-Japanese parties and non-partisans participating. It was established in July 1938 and ended in March 1948. It also had a Constitutional Council.

== History ==
=== Predecessor: Supreme National Defense Council, National Defense Council ===
According to Article 9 of the "Organizational Regulations of the Supreme National Defense Conference " adopted by the Standing Committee of the Central Executive Committee of the Kuomintang on August 12, 1937, "The Supreme National Defense Conference shall establish a National Defense Council, which shall be appointed or hired by the Chairman of the Supreme National Defense Conference." The National Defense Council is the advisory body of the Supreme National Defense Conference. When Wang Jingwei answered Hu Shi 's question, he said that the purpose of establishing the National Defense Council was to "enable everyone to understand and support the government."

On August 13, 1937, Chiang Kai-shek, Chairman of the Supreme National Defense Council, and Wang Jingwei, Vice Chairman, invited the first batch of 16 senators of the Supreme National Defense Council to attend the meeting in Nanjing. These senators included members of the Chinese Communist Party, the Chinese Youth Party, the National Socialist Party, the Third Party, the National Salvation Association, the Chinese Vocational Education Society, and senior figures in the Kuomintang who had never been in power: Tao Xisheng, Fu Sinian, Zhang Boling, Jiang Menglin, Li Huang, Shen Junru, Huang Yanpei, Ma Junwu, Mao Zedong, Yan Yangchu, Zhang Yaozeng, Zhang Junmai, Liang Shuming, Zeng Qi, Hu Shi, and Jiang Baili. On August 17, 1937, the first meeting of the " Supreme National Defense Council " was held in a temporary wooden building in the Sun Yat-sen Mausoleum in Nanjing.

On September 9, 1937, Chiang Kai-shek, in his capacity as Chairman of the Supreme National Defense Council, added nine more senators, including Shi Zhaoji, Xu Qian, Zou Taofen, Zuo Shunsheng, Zhang Dongsun, Li Huang, and Yang Gengtao. According to the Outline of the Organization of the Supreme National Defense Council, a secretariat was established, with Peng Xuepei as the Secretary-General and Gan Naiguang as his successor.

The number of participants in each National Defense Council meeting was less than 20 people at most. The meetings were informal and flexible, with a maximum of four meetings a week. Chiang Kai-shek, the chairman of the council, never attended a meeting. The meeting was always chaired by Wang Jingwei, the vice chairman of the council. Mao Zedong, Zhang Yaozeng, and Yan Huiqing never attended a meeting. Zhou Enlai attended the meeting on behalf of Mao Zedong many times.

The Senate of the Supreme National Defense Council held its last meeting on June 17, 1938, having met a total of 64 times.

=== National Political Suffrage Association ===
On March 1, 1938, the Chinese Communist Party proposed the idea of "improving the organs of public opinion" in the "Proposal of the Central Committee of the Chinese Communist Party at the Provisional National Congress of the Kuomintang", and the Kuomintang decided to accept it. From March 29 to April 1, 1938, the Kuomintang held a provisional national congress in Wuhan and passed the " Outline for Anti-Japanese War and National Construction ", Article 4 of which stipulated that "organize the organs of public opinion participation, unite the national forces, concentrate the national thoughts and insights, facilitate the decision and implementation of national policies, accelerate the completion of local autonomy conditions, and improve political institutions." On April 12, the Fourth Plenary Session of the Fifth National Congress of the Kuomintang passed the "Organization Regulations of the National Political Consultative Conference" and the "Proposal for Improving Party Affairs", stipulating that the National Political Consultative Conference is an advisory body with the right to listen to the National Government's policy reports, inquire, make suggestions, and investigate, but it does not have the power to enforce the resolutions passed by the National Government.

In June 1938, the National Government appointed Wang Jingwei as the Chairman of the National Political Consultative Conference and Zhang Boling as the Acting Vice Chairman. At the same time, a list of 200 councillors was announced. Most of them were members of the Kuomintang, but there were also members of other parties and independents. The seven Chinese Communist Party councillors were Mao Zedong, Chen Shaoyu, Qin Bangxian, Lin Boqu, Wu Yuzhang, Dong Biwu and Deng Yingchao. At the same time, the National Defense Council was terminated.

The first National Political Consultative Conference was held on July 6, 1938, at the Shanghai Grand Theater on Liangyi Street in Hankou (now the Zhongyuan Cinema on Dongting Street in Hankou), with a total of 156 members in attendance. Mao Zedong was absent, but sent a telegram, proposing three opinions: "First, persist in the war of resistance; second, persist in a united war of resistance; third, persist in a protracted war." The conference issued the "Declaration of the First National Political Consultative Conference" and elected 25 people including Zhang Junmai, Zuo Shunsheng, Zeng Qi, Dong Biwu, Qin Bangxian, and Chen Shaoyu as the first resident members. After the fall of Wuhan, the National Political Consultative Conference moved to Chongqing.

The National Political Consultative Conference had four sessions and held thirteen sessions. After the Southern Anhui Incident in 1941, Dong Biwu and other members of the Chinese Communist Party refused to attend the sessions of the Political Consultative Conference several times to protest the anti-communist policies of the Kuomintang. In May 1945, the Chinese Communist Party held its Seventh National Congress and declared that it would not participate in the Fourth National Political Consultative Conference, on the grounds of protesting the Kuomintang's one-party dictatorship and its monopoly over the National Assembly.

On January 7, 1947, the National Government revised and promulgated the "National Political Consultative Conference Organization Regulations" and the "National Political Consultative Conference Member Quota List". On April 21, the National Government scheduled the convening of the Fourth Session of the National Political Consultative Conference in Nanjing on May 20.

After the National Assembly was convened, the National Political Consultative Conference officially ended in March 1948, and Chiang attended the tea party and delivered a speech.

== Meetings ==
=== The 3rd Conference of the 4th Session ===
On April 21, 1947, the National Government decided to convene the Fourth Session of the Third National Political Consultative Conference in Nanjing on May 20. On April 26, the Standing Committee of the National Political Consultative Conference held a meeting and invited Huo Baoshu, Director of the Executive Yuan's Relief and Rehabilitation Administration, to report on the relief work in the past year. On May 20, the Fourth Session of the Third National Political Consultative Conference opened. Chairman Zhang Boling delivered a speech, hoping that peace would be achieved soon. Chiang attended the meeting and delivered a speech, saying that whether peaceful reunification could be achieved depended entirely on whether the Chinese Communist Party stopped its military operations and restored national transportation. On May 21, Executive Yuan President Zhang Qun reported on the government's work to the National Political Consultative Conference. The council members raised more than 100 oral and written questions on domestic peace issues and people's livelihood issues.

On May 23, Finance Minister Yu Hongjun reported to the National Political Consultative Conference on the financial situation, saying that last year's budget deficit was 270 million yuan, due to excessive military expenditures and demobilization relief expenditures; in response to the questions of the Political Consultative Conference members, he said that the investigation reports of Zhongfu and Yangshi could not be made public, and the Huang Jinchao case was still under trial. Minister of Food Gu Zhenglun reported that the method of managing grain was to sell off grain, suppress the trend of price increases, and distribute it at a fair price. On May 24, the National Political Consultative Conference continued its meeting. Minister of Agriculture and Forestry Zuo Shunsheng, Minister of National Defense Bai Chongxi, and Minister of Transportation Yu Dawei reported on the situation of agriculture, forestry, national defense, and transportation respectively, questioned the military report, and had different opinions on war. On May 28, the National Political Consultative Conference held a review meeting to discuss the peace issue: Kuomintang councillors advocated "government suppression of rebellion" and "issued clear orders to attack"; other councillors, including Xu Deheng, Huang Yanpei, Cheng Ximeng, Wang Zaoshi and more than 10 others, asked the conference to put the people first, formulate a peace plan, and appeal to both the government and the Communist Party for peace. After the councillors finished speaking, the presidium announced that the peace proposal would be submitted to the special review committee for review.

On May 25, Minister of Education Zhu Jiahua reported on education work at the National Political Consultative Conference. The political consultants severely questioned the student movement. Zhu Jiahua said that the student movement was caused by the activities of Communist Party members in the school. On May 26, Minister of Water Resources Xue Dubi and Minister of the Interior Zhang Lisheng reported on water resources and interior affairs to the National Political Consultative Conference. On May 27, the National Political Consultative Conference continued its meeting. The Ministry of Economic Affairs, the Resources Committee, and the Relief and Rehabilitation Administration reported on their work respectively. At this point, the reporting work of all units under the Executive Yuan was completed. In the evening, Chiang Kai-shek hosted a banquet for the political consultants, saying that whether peace could be achieved depended entirely on the attitude of the Communist Party. On May 28, Chiang Kai-shek gave a speech to the political consultants, saying that the government's original intention of peace had never changed, and that the student action was completely planned by the Communist Party. The government had no choice but to issue the "Provisional Measures for Maintaining Social Order." On May 31, the Political Consultative Conference decided to ask the government to negotiate a loan from the United States and try its best to recover Lushun and Dalian to prevent Japan from rebuilding its military.

On May 26, the National Political Consultative Conference passed a temporary motion, requesting the conference to discuss the peace plan, and invited the CCP political consultants to Nanjing to attend the meeting. On May 27, the Shanghai Municipal Political Consultative Conference sent a telegram to the government asking it to resume peace talks with the CCP, sent a telegram to Mao Zedong urging him to come to Nanjing for consultation, and sent telegrams to various legal bodies calling for peace. On May 30, the National Political Consultative Conference divided into groups to review the work report and related proposals.

On June 2, the National Political Consultative Conference discussed, reviewed and passed 480 proposals and declared closed. The conference elected 31 resident members. On June 6, Chiang presided over the State Council meeting to discuss the peace plan of the Political Consultative Conference and said: Whether peace can be achieved depends entirely on the attitude of the Chinese Communist Party.

On July 31, the National Government Gazette No. 2829 stated that seven current members of the Chinese Communist Party's Political Consultative Conference, namely Mao Zedong, Lin Zuhan, Chen Shaoyu, Deng Yingchao, Dong Biwu, Zhou Enlai and Wu Yuzhang, were expelled from the committee.

== Six Political Consultants Visit Yan'an ==
In May 1945, the Seventh National Congress of the Chinese Communist Party was held, and it was declared that it would not participate in the Fourth National Political Consultative Conference, on the grounds of protesting against the Kuomintang's one-party dictatorship and its monopoly of the National Assembly. Tensions arose between the Kuomintang and the Communist Party. On June 2, centrist National Political Consultative Conference members Chu Fucheng, Huang Yanpei, Leng Yu, Wang Yunwu, Zuo Shunsheng, Fu Sinian, and Zhang Bojun sent a telegram to Mao Zedong and Zhou Enlai from Chongqing, hoping that the Communist Party would unite and continue to negotiate. On June 18, Mao Zedong and Zhou Enlai replied to Chu Fucheng and others, expressing their willingness to negotiate and welcoming them to visit Yan'an. On July 1, Chu Fucheng, Zuo Shunsheng, Fu Sinian, Huang Yanpei, Leng Yu, and Zhang Bojun, accompanied by Wang Ruofei, flew from Chongqing to Yan'an. Mao Zedong, Zhou Enlai, Liu Shaoqi, Zhu De, Lin Boqu, He Long, Peng Dehuai, Nie Rongzhen, Lin Biao, Liu Bocheng and others went to the airport to greet them. Mao Zedong held three talks with the six political consultants for more than ten hours. The CCP requested to cancel the meeting of the National Assembly in November and to convene the Political Consultative Conference first. On July 4, Mao Zedong handed over the "Records of the Talks between the CCP Representatives and Chu Fucheng, Huang Yanpei and Six Other Political Consultative Conference Members in Yan'an" compiled by the CCP to Chu Fucheng and others.

On July 4, Mao Zedong met with Huang Yanpei in a cave in Yangjialing. Huang Yanpei said: "I have lived for more than 60 years. I have seen with my own eyes what I have heard, and it is true that 'the rise is rapid and the fall is sudden'. Many units, such as a person, a family, a group, a place, and even a country, have not been able to escape the domination of this cycle. Generally speaking, at the beginning, everyone is very focused and every effort is made. Perhaps it was difficult and hard at that time, and one could only find a way to survive from a thousand deaths. Then the environment gradually improved, and the spirit gradually relaxed. Some people, because of the long-term, naturally became lazy, and from a few people, they became the majority, and when the trend was formed, although Even with great force, it cannot be reversed, and it cannot be remedied. Throughout history, there have been cases of "government laziness and official success", "government collapses when the leader dies", and "seeking glory and suffering humiliation". In short, no one has been able to escape this cycle. From the past to the present, I have a rough understanding of the CCP leaders, which is that they hope to find a new way to escape the control of this cycle. Mao Zedong replied: "We have found a new way, and we can escape this cycle. This new way is democracy. Only by allowing the people to supervise the government will the government dare not relax. Only when everyone takes responsibility will the government not collapse when the leader dies."

On July 5, Mao Zedong waited at the Yan'an Airport to see off the six councillors as they flew back to Chongqing.

Huang Yanpei published a book called Return from Yan'an after returning to Chongqing, which specifically recorded his trip to Yan'an.
