= Stinking Old Ninth =

Historical Chinese dysphemism for intellectuals

The Stinking Old Ninth (Chinese: 臭老九; pinyin: chòu lǎo jiǔ) is a Chinese dysphemism for intellectuals used at two major points, the Yuan dynasty (1271–1368) and the Cultural Revolution (1966–1976).

== History ==
=== The Yuan dynasty ===
The term originated during the Yuan dynasty where the Mongol conquerors identified ten "castes" of Chinese: bureaucrats, officials, Buddhist monks, Taoist priests, physicians, workers, hunters, prostitutes, (ninth) Confucian scholars and finally beggars, with only beggars at a status below the intellectuals.

=== The Cultural Revolution ===
During the Chinese Cultural Revolution (1966–1976), the term "Stinking Old Ninth" was often used as a synonym for intellectuals, who were widely persecuted during the revolution and pushed to undergo "self-transformation". The "Nine Black Categories", expanded from the Five Black Categories (landlords, rich farmers, anti-revolutionaries, bad influences, right-wingers), further included traitors, spies, capitalist roaders and (ninth) intellectuals.

Mao Zedong's distrust towards intellectuals was evident even before the Cultural Revolution. For example, during the Anti-Rightist Campaign in 1957–1959, tens of thousands of intellectuals were persecuted. The name "bourgeois intellectual" became a standard phrase in Mao's time. During the Cultural Revolution, intellectuals were called the "Stinking Old Ninth" and were subjected to condemnation, purge, imprisonment and even execution. On May 3, 1975, Mao made the following comments at his meeting with members of the Politburo of the Chinese Communist Party:

In the fields of education, science, literature and art, and medicine, where intellectuals are concentrated, there are some good [people], and there are a few Marxist-Leninists. You [at the] Ministry of Foreign Affairs [are at] a place where intellectuals are concentrated, am I wrong? You two are stinking intellectuals, you should admit this, being the stinking old ninth category, the old ninth category cannot [just] walk away.

==== Rehabilitation ====
After the Cultural Revolution, in August 1977, Deng Xiaoping mentioned in a meeting that it was the Gang of Four who came up with the phrase and that Mao himself saw intellectuals as still having some value in society. A few days later, Hua Guofeng also attributed the invention of the term "Stinking Old Ninth" to the Gang of Four in his talk at the 11th National Congress of the Chinese Communist Party. In the Boluan Fanzheng period, the saying of "Stinking Old Ninth" was abolished and intellectuals were rehabilitated.

== See also ==
- Anti-intellectualism
- Five Black Categories
- Five Red Categories
- Red August
