= Eight Elders =

Powerful group of Chinese Communist Party members

The Eight Great Eminent Officials (Chinese: 八大元老; pinyin: Bā dà yuánlǎo), abbreviated as the Eight Elders (Chinese: 八老; pinyin: Bā lǎo), were a group of elderly members of the Chinese Communist Party (CCP) who held substantial power in the last two decades of the 20th century. In the English-speaking world, these men are often called The Eight Immortals as an allusion to the Taoist deities commonly known as the Eight Immortals.

== History ==
The Central Advisory Commission was the institutional power base of the Eight Elders. Deng Xiaoping, who emerged as China's top leader in December 1978, as a result of the 3rd Plenary Session of the 11th Central Committee, was the most powerful of the group, but his power was never absolute, and he had to consult and make compromises with the other seven Elders, of whom the most prominent were Chen Yun and Li Xiannian (considered the second and third in power, respectively, and both associated with the leftist hard-liners and opposition to reform and market-oriented economy). Deng's allies among the Elders included Yang Shangkun and Peng Zhen.

By the late 1980s, all Elders, including Deng himself, were united in opposition to further political reforms, while holding different views on economic and foreign affairs.

According to reformist General Secretary Zhao Ziyang, of all the Elders, Li Xiannian was the most prominent, most active and most successful in opposing and blocking changes and reforms in both political and economic issues. Important decisions were often made in Deng's home. The Eight Elders were able to remove three Party leaders. Hua Guofeng was gradually removed from Premier and Party chairman between 1980 and 1981; Hu Yaobang was removed in 1987; and, Zhao Ziyang was removed in 1989. Deng, the core of the eight Elders, retired after the 5th Plenary Session of the 13th Central Committee (November 1989), when he resigned from his last official title (Chairman of the Central Military Commission), and the rest of the Elders officially retired after the 14th Party Congress in October 1992 when the Central Advisory Commission was abolished. They still held decisive influence behind the scenes until Deng's death in February 1997.

== Membership ==
The membership was never formally stated. With Deng Xiaoping as the main holder of power, the eight elders are accepted to include:

Name	Image	Position(s) Held	Birthplace (Ancestry)	Ref
Deng Xiaoping (1904–1997)		Politburo Standing Committee (1977–1987); Political Consultative Conference chairman (1978–1983); Central Military Commission chairman (1981–1989); Central Advisory Commission chairman (1982–1987)	Guang'an, Sichuan (Jiaying, Guangdong)	
Chen Yun (1905–1995)		Politburo Standing Committee (1978–1987); Central Commission for Discipline Inspection First Secretary (1979–1987); Central Advisory Commission chairman (1987–1992)	Qingpu, Shanghai	
Li Xiannian (1909–1992)		Politburo Standing Committee (1977–1987); President of the People's Republic of China (1983–1988); Chinese People's Political Consultative Conference chairman (1988–1992)	Huang'an, Hubei	
Peng Zhen (1902–1997)		Chairman of the Standing Committee of the National People's Congress (1983–1988)	Houma, Shanxi	
Yang Shangkun (1907–1998)		President of the People's Republic of China (1988–1993); Central Military Commission vice chairman (1982–1992)	Tongnan, Chongqing	
Bo Yibo (1908–2007)		Central Advisory Committee vice chairman (1982–1992)	Dingxiang, Shanxi	
Wang Zhen (1908–1993)		Vice President of the People's Republic of China (1988–1993); Central Advisory Committee vice chairman (1985–1992)	Liuyang, Hunan	
Song Renqiong (1909–2005)		Central Advisory Committee vice chairman (1985–1992)	Liuyang, Hunan	
Deng Yingchao (1904–1992)	Portrait of Deng Yingchao	Chinese People's Political Consultative Conference Chairwoman (1983–1988)	Nanning, Guangxi (Guangshan, Henan)	
Xi Zhongxun (1913–2002)		CCP Politburo (1982–1987); Standing Committee of the National People's Congress vice chairman (1988–1993)	Fuping, Shaanxi (Dengzhou, Henan)	
Wan Li (1916–2015)		Vice Premier of the People's Republic of China (1980–1988); Chairman of the Standing Committee of the National People's Congress (1988–1993); CCP Politburo (1982–1992)	Dongping, Shandong	

Timeline of the life span of members

== Descendants ==
Descendants of the eight Elders who have benefited significantly from nepotism and cronyism constitute a group now known as "the Princelings" or the "Crown Prince Party". Its members, rising through party ranks, can easily overrule any opposition in their jurisdictions, even if they are assigned to a local administrative position. They are often seen to outrank other party officials and possess greater prestige due to their lineage. Bloomberg has reported on the extensive wealth accumulated by these descendants via their roles in various public and private companies. Xi Jinping, the son of Xi Zhongxun, is the current paramount leader of China.

== Notes ==
Membership according to various authors
No.	LA Times 1992	Tkacik 2004	SCMP 2008	Bloomberg 2012	Andrésy 2015	Bendini 2016
1	Deng Xiaoping	Deng Xiaoping	Deng Xiaoping	Deng Xiaoping	Deng Xiaoping	
2	Yang Shangkun	Yang Zhangkun	Yang Shangkun	Yang Shangkun	Yang Shangkun	
3	Chen Yun	Chen Yun	Chen Yun	Chen Yun	Chen Yun	
4	Li Xiannian	Li Xiannian	Li Xiannian	Li Xiannian	Li Xiannian	
5	Peng Zhen	Peng Zhen	Peng Zhen	Peng Zhen	Peng Zhen	
6	Wang Zhen	Wang Zhen	Wang Zhen	Wang Zhen	Wang Zhen	
7	Bo Yibo	Bo Yibo	Bo Yibo	Bo Yibo	Bo Yibo	
8	Song Renqiong		Song Renqiong	Song Renqiong		
8		Deng Yingchao	Deng Yingchao		Deng Yingchao	
Others			Xi Zhongxun			Xi Zhongxun
Others			Wan Li			
