= Five Black Categories =

Five groups considered enemies of the Cultural Revolution

The "Five Black Categories" (Chinese: 黑五类; pinyin: Hēiwǔlèi) were classifications of political identity and social status in Mao era (1949–1976) of the People's Republic of China, especially during the Cultural Revolution (1966–1976); these categories include landlords, rich farmers, counter-revolutionaries, bad influencers, and rightists. People who were labelled as members of these five groups were discriminated against in society and were considered enemies of the Cultural Revolution, subject to constant persecution and even massacres. Most members of the Five Black Categories were rehabilitated in the Boluan Fanzheng period after the Cultural Revolution.

== Definition ==
The "Five Black Categories" were:

- Landlords (地主; dìzhǔ)
- Rich farmers (富农; fùnóng)
- Counter-revolutionaries (反革命; fǎngémìng)
- Bad influencers ["bad elements"] (坏分子; huàifènzǐ), such as thieves and petty criminals
- Right-wingers (右派; yòupài)

"Right-wingers" or "rightists" were included as a "black category" starting from the Anti-rightist Campaign in 1957. During the Cultural Revolution, the original five categories were expanded to nine categories, further including traitors, spies, capitalist roaders, and intellectuals ("Stinking Old Ninth").

Conversely, Mao categorized groups of people, such as members of the Chinese Communist Party, poor farmers and low class workers, as Five Red Categories. This new Red/Black class distinction was used to create a status society.

== Cultural Revolution ==
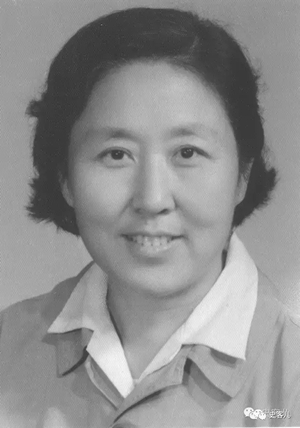
Bian Zhongyun was the first teacher (education worker) killed by Red Guards in Beijing during the Red August of 1966.

Starting from the "Red August" of 1966 in Beijing, members in the Five Black Categories were separated out for struggle sessions, humiliation, re-education, beating, and persecution. Many of them were killed by the Red Guards and others. Mao believed that victimizing these people, as well as other groups of citizens – such as teachers, educated intellectuals, and enemies of the Communist Party (cadres) – was a necessary component to initiate the changes in the Chinese culture that he desired. He believed that those who were victimized either deserved it or became better citizens as a result of it. In general, intellectuals were called the "Stinking Old Ninth". Effectively, within a few years, the education and medical infrastructure of China was completely destroyed.

According to a speech by Jiang Qing, who was his wife and the party's senior leader, "If good people beat bad people, it serves them right; if bad people beat good people, the good people achieve glory; if good people beat good people, it is a misunderstanding; without beatings, you do not get acquainted and then no longer need to beat them" (Walder 149).

Members of the Black Classes were systematically discriminated against, as classification affected employment opportunities and career prospects and even marriage opportunities. This could also be passed on to their children. Over time this resulted in a victimized underclass that was treated as if it were still composed of powerful and dominant people.

== Rehabilitation ==
The majority of the members of the Five Black Categories were rehabilitated during the Boluan Fanzheng period after the Cultural Revolution. Most "rightists" who had been persecuted since the Anti-rightist Campaign in 1957 were rehabilitated, except for around 100 "rightists" including Zhang Bojun, Luo Longji and Chu Anping. In addition to the "rightists", official statistics show that by 1984 around 4.4 million "landlords" and "rich farmers" had been rehabilitated, and a total of more than 20 million people who were labelled as members of the "four black categories" or their families had received rectification in their social status.

== See also ==
- Stinking Old Ninth
- Five Red Categories
- Four Olds
- Songbun, similar classification by background in North Korea
