= Four Olds =

Elements of Chinese culture purged during Mao's Cultural Revolution

The Four Olds (simplified Chinese: 四旧; traditional Chinese: 四舊; pinyin: sì jiù) refer to categories used by the Red Guards during the Cultural Revolution to characterize elements of Chinese culture prior to the Chinese Communist Revolution that they were attempting to destroy. The Four Olds were 'old ideas', 'old culture', 'old customs', and 'old habits'. (Note: 旧思想; jiù sīxiǎng 旧文化; jiù wénhuà 旧风俗; jiù fēngsú 旧习惯; jiù xíguàn) During the Red August of 1966, shortly after the onset of the Cultural Revolution, the Red Guards' campaign to destroy the Four Olds began amid the massacres being carried out in Beijing.

== Terminology ==
The term "Four Olds" first appeared on 1 June 1966, in Chen Boda's People's Daily editorial, "Sweep Away All Cow Demons and Snake Spirits", where the Old Things were described as anti-proletarian, "fostered by the exploiting classes, [and] have poisoned the minds of the people for thousands of years". However, which customs, cultures, habits, and ideas specifically constituted the "Four Olds" were never clearly defined.

On 8 August, the Central Committee of the Chinese Communist Party used the term at its 8th National Congress. The term was endorsed on 18 August by Lin Biao at a mass rally, and from there it spread to Red Flag magazine, as well as to Red Guard publications. During this time, changes associated with the destruction of the Four Olds included: renaming places and people with "revolutionary names", destruction of historical and religious sites and texts, and the arrest of clergy. Chinese New Year celebrations were banned.

Calls to destroy the "Four Olds" usually did not appear in isolation, but were contrasted with the hope of building the "Four News" (new customs, new culture, new habits, new ideas). Newborn socialist things were said to struggle against the Four Olds. The idea that Chinese culture was responsible for China's economic backwardness and needed to be reformed had some precedent in the May Fourth Movement (1919), and was also encouraged by colonial authorities during the Second Sino-Japanese War.

== Campaign to destroy the Four Olds ==
The campaign to Destroy the Four Olds and Cultivate the Four News (Chinese: 破四旧立四新; pinyin: Pò Sìjiù Lì Sìxīn) began in Beijing on 19 August during the "Red August". Academic Alessandro Russo writes that the destruction of the Four Olds was an ambiguous campaign from the perspective of the Chinese Communist Party (CCP). He argues that in a time of increasing political pluralization, the CCP sought to channel student activism towards obvious class enemies and less relevant objectives to make it easier for it to contain the situation.

=== The "re-naming" campaign ===
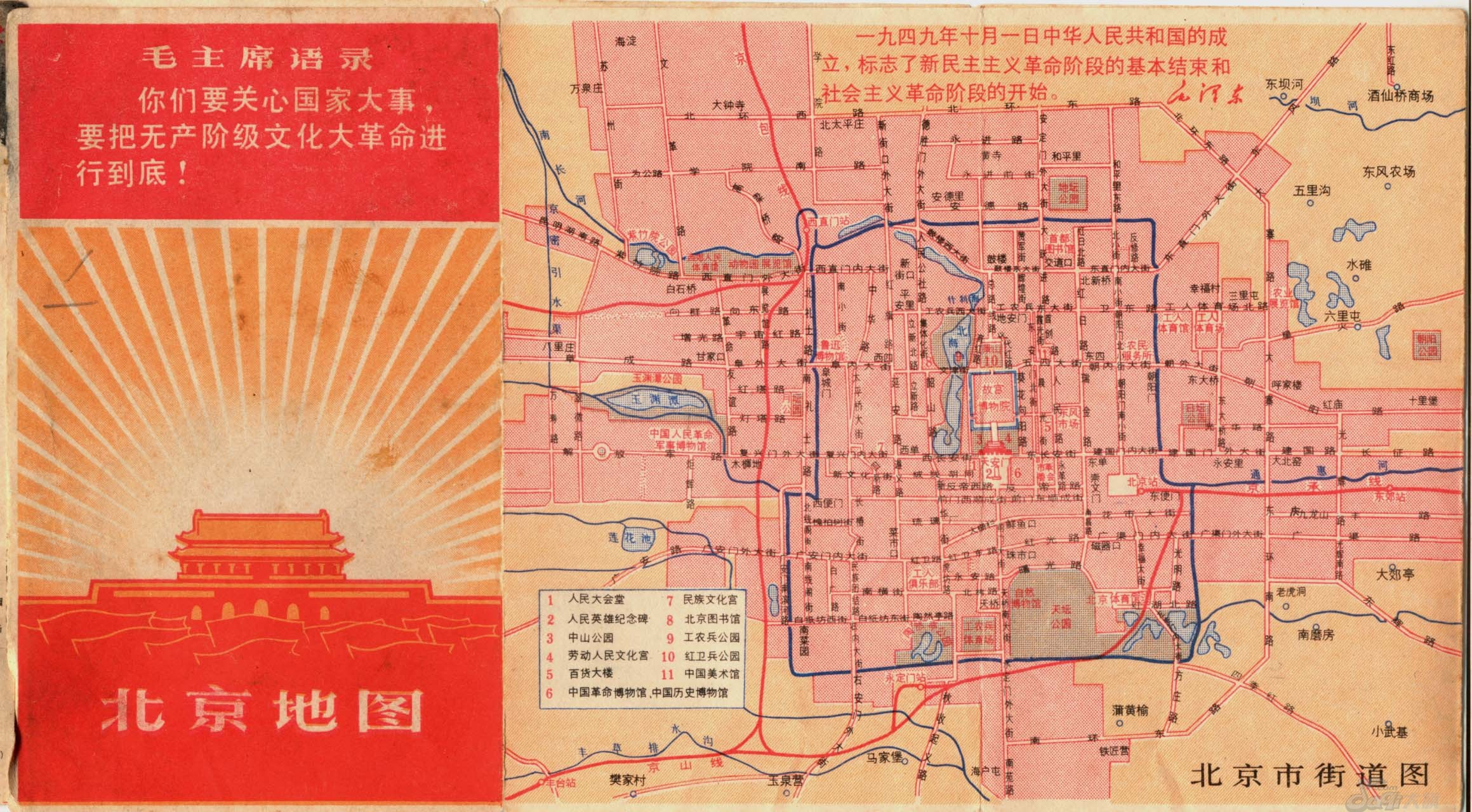
A 1968 map of Beijing showing streets and landmarks renamed during the Cultural Revolution. "Āndìngménnèidàjiē" (Stability Gate Inner Street) became "Dàyuèjìnlù" (Great Leap Forward Road), "Táijīchǎngdàjiē" (Taiji Factory Street) became "Yǒnggélù" (Perpetually Ousting Road), "Dōngjiāomínxiàng" (East Cross People's Lane) was renamed "Fǎndìlù" (Anti-Imperialist Road), "Běihǎigōngyuán" (North Sea Park) was renamed "Gōngnóngbīnggōngyuán" (Worker-Peasant-Soldier Park) and "Jǐngshāngōngyuán" (Mountain View Park) became "Hóngwèibīnggōngyuán" (Red Guards Park). Most of the Cultural Revolution–era name changes were later reversed.

Across China, signs bearing old road names were vandalized and renamed. The first things to change were the names of streets and stores: "Blue Sky Clothes Store" to "Defending Mao Zedong Clothes Store", "Cai E Road" to "Red Guards Road", and so forth.

In Beijing, the name of the road where the embassy of the Soviet Union was stationed was changed to "Anti-revisionism Road". The Peking Union Medical College Hospital, founded in 1921 by the Rockefeller Foundation, was renamed "Anti-Imperialist Hospital".

In Huangpu district of Shanghai, the city's commercial center, Red Guards tore down 93 percent of shop signboards (2,166 of 2,328), and renamed restaurants, schools and hospitals. Red Guards also took Nanjing Road as their revolutionary headquarters in Shanghai, renaming it the "Anti-Imperialism Street".

Many people across China also changed their given names to revolutionary slogans, such as Zhihong (志红, "Determined Red"), Jige (继革, "Following the Revolution") and Weidong (卫东, "Safeguard the Orient or Protect Mao").

=== Public sites ===
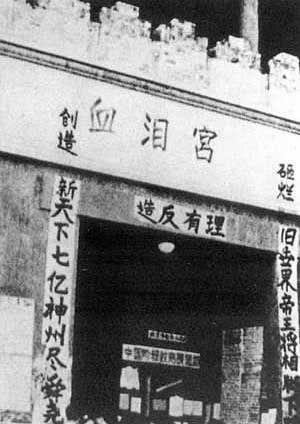
The Forbidden City in Beijing was renamed the "Palace of Blood and Tears".

The Cemetery of Confucius was attacked in November 1966, during the Cultural Revolution, when it was visited and vandalized by a team of Red Guards from Beijing Normal University, led by Tan Houlan. The corpse of the 76th-generation Duke Yansheng (a descendant of Confucius) was removed from its grave and hung naked from a tree in front of the palace during the desecration of the cemetery in the Cultural Revolution.

The Chinese government stopped short of endorsing the physical destruction of products. In fact, the government protected significant archaeological discoveries made during the Cultural Revolution, such as the Mawangdui, the Leshan Giant Buddha and the Terracotta Army. Upon learning that Red Guards were approaching the Forbidden City, Premier Zhou Enlai ordered the gates shut immediately and deployed the People's Liberation Army against the Red Guards. After this incident, Zhou attempted to create a more peaceful code of conduct for the Red Guards, with the support of cadres Tao Zhu, Li Fuchuan, and Chen Yi. This plan was foiled by the ultra-leftists Jiang Qing, and Zhang Chunqiao (members of the Gang of Four) as well as Kang Sheng (in collaboration with the former two). Although many of Zhou's other initiatives to stem the destruction failed because of their or Mao's own opposition, he did succeed in preventing Beijing from being renamed "East Is Red City" and the Chinese guardian lions in front of Tian'anmen Square from being replaced with statues of Mao.

In later stages of the campaign, examples of Chinese architecture were destroyed, classical literature and Chinese paintings were torn apart, and Chinese temples were desecrated.

=== Personal harassment and private properties ===
Other manifestations of the Red Guard campaign included giving speeches, posting big-character posters, and harassment of people, such as intellectuals, who defiantly demonstrated the Four Olds. This escalated from accosting people in the streets due to their dress or hairstyle, to widespread murder, assault, arbitrary detention and the ransacking of private homes. Red Guards broke into the homes of the wealthy and destroyed paintings, books, and furniture; all were items that they viewed as part of the Four Olds.

Many artists and other cultural professionals were persecuted by vigilantes, although some cultural advances came about because of the period, including the integration of "new" western instruments and ballet into Peking opera.

=== Attacks on ethnic minorities and book burnings ===
Languages and customs of ethnic minorities in China were labeled as part of the Four Olds and texts in ethnic languages were burned. Bilingual education was suppressed.

== Gallery ==
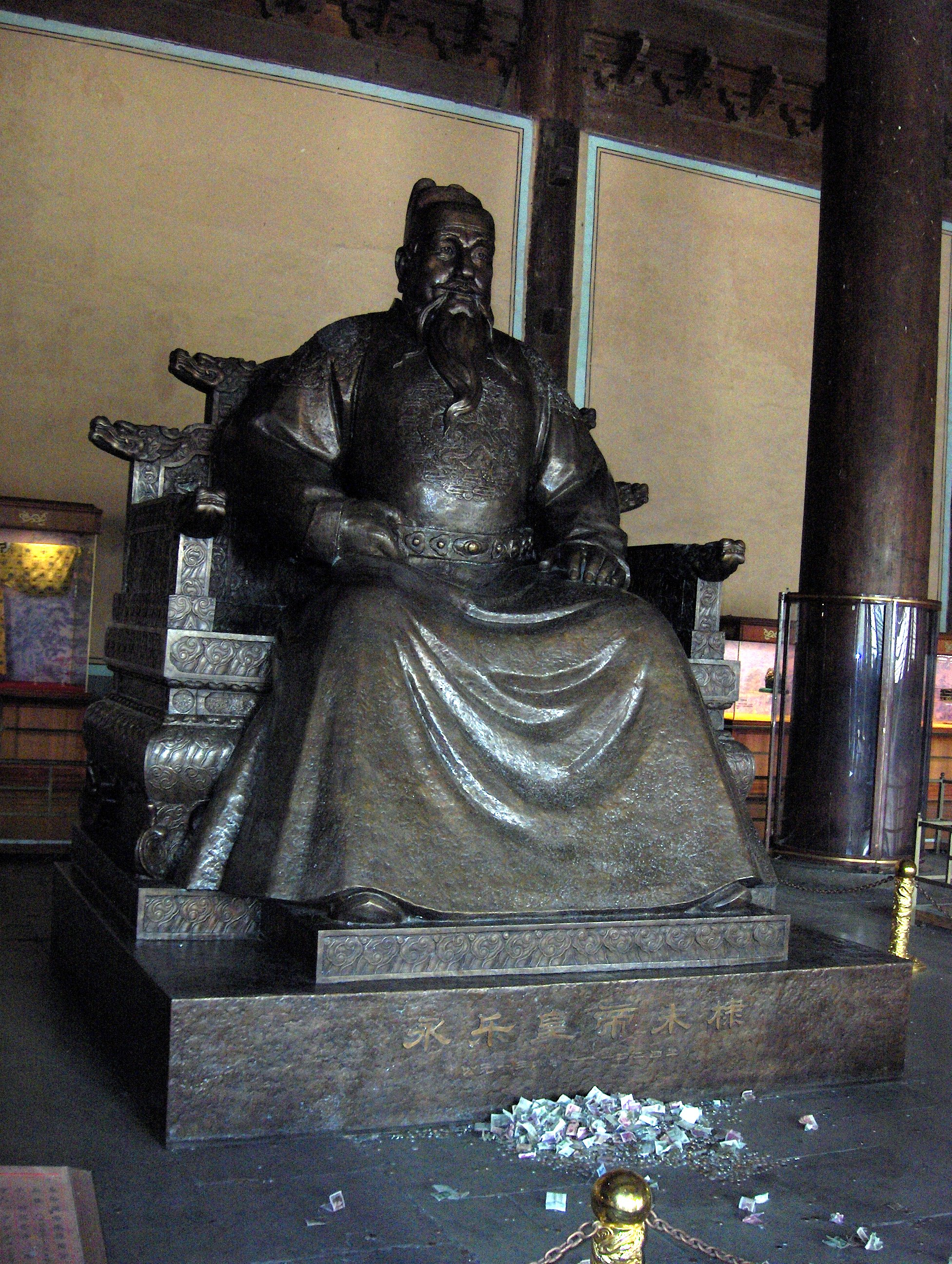
This statue of the Yongle Emperor was originally carved in stone, and was destroyed in the Cultural Revolution; a metal replica is in its place.

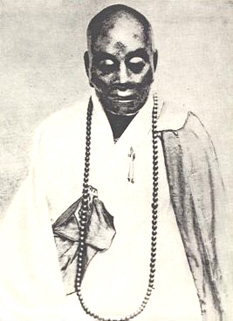
The mummified remains of the 8th-century Buddhist monk Huineng were damaged during the Cultural Revolution.

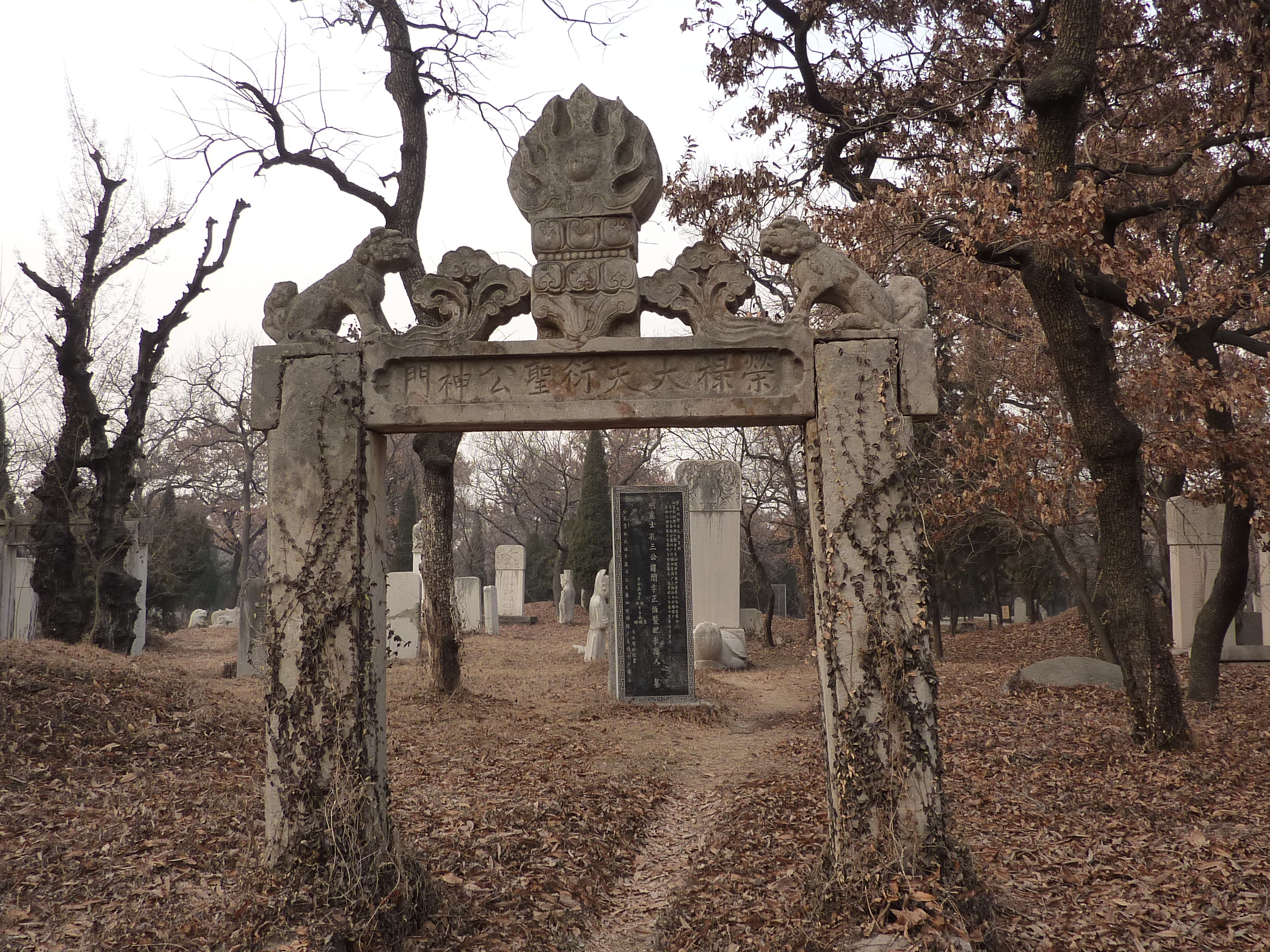
The Cemetery of Confucius was attacked by Red Guards in November 1966.

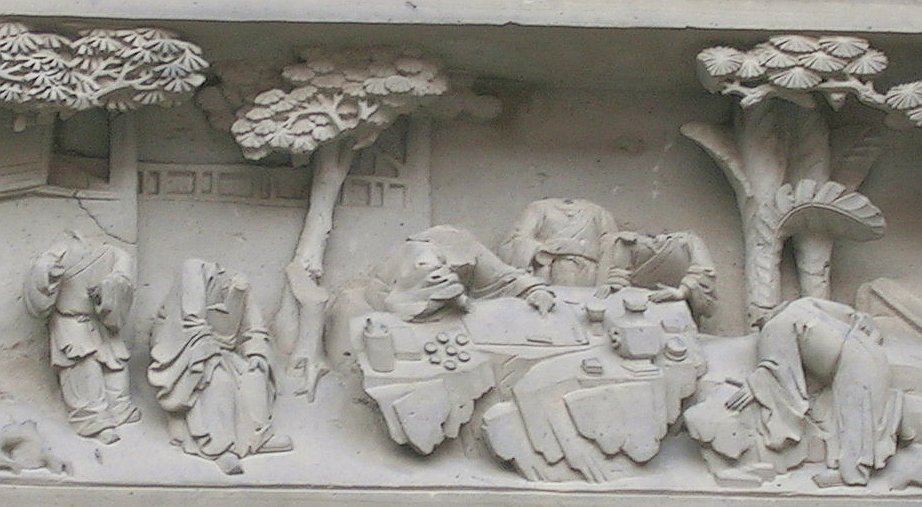
A frieze damaged during the Cultural Revolution, originally from a garden house of a rich imperial official in Suzhou

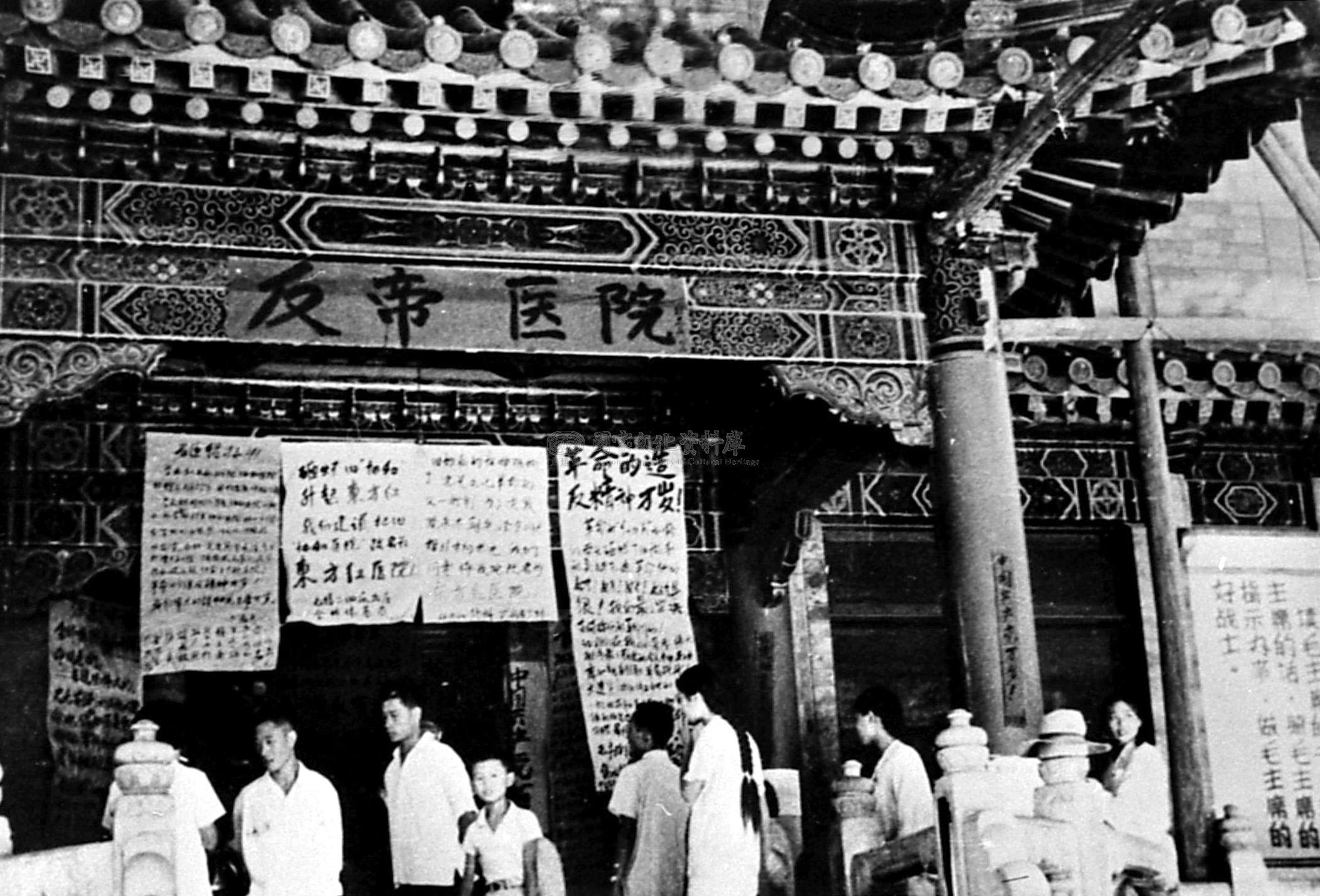
The Peking Union Medical College Hospital was renamed "Anti-Imperialist Hospital" by Red Guards.

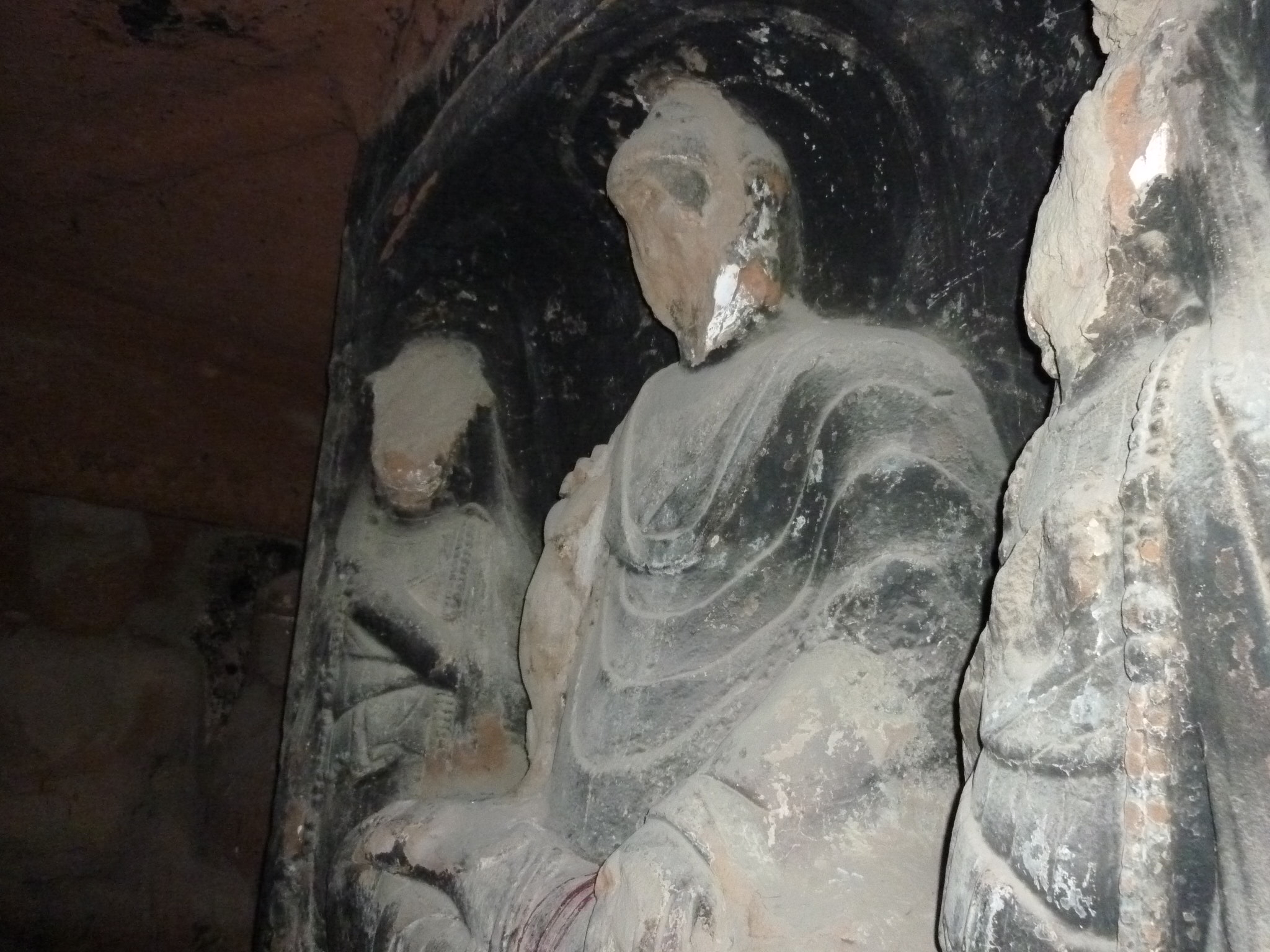
A damaged statue of the Buddha

== Aftermath ==
=== Appraisal of damage ===
No official statistics have ever been produced by the Communist party in terms of reporting the actual cost of damage. By 1978, many stories of death and destruction caused by the Cultural Revolution had leaked out of China and became known worldwide.

=== Preservation ===
During and after the Cultural Revolution, efforts were made to protect Chinese cultural artifacts. Shanghai officials intervened in Red Guard house searches, relocating items to safety and documenting those that couldn't be moved for future restoration. Post–Cultural Revolution, there was a renewed effort to preserve cultural heritage, with initiatives like the Lost Cultural Relics Recovery Program and the establishment of the State Administration of Cultural Heritage to protect and manage historical sites and artifacts.

== See also ==
- 1989 Mao portrait vandalism incident, vandalism of the portrait of Mao Zedong
- Burning of books and burying of scholars, 3rd century BC China
- Destruction of the Goddess of Democracy, as part of the 1989 Tiananmen Square massacre
- List of campaigns of the Chinese Communist Party
