= Red August =

Series of massacres in Beijing during August 1966; part of the Cultural Revolution

- Part of the Cultural Revolution in China
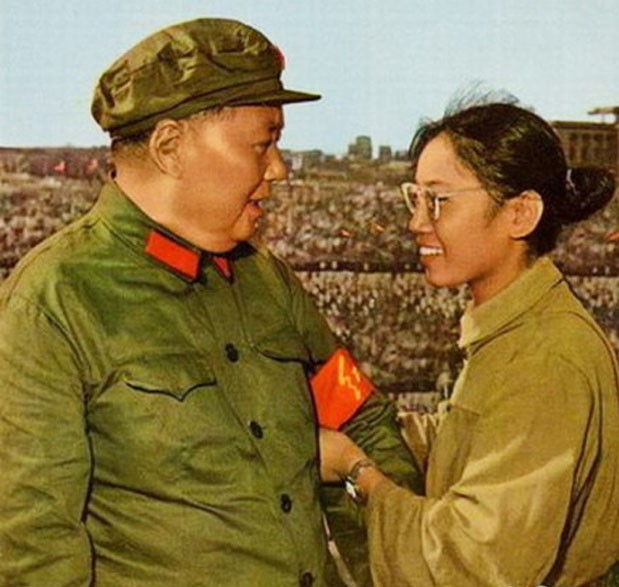
- Song Binbin ties a red armband for Chairman Mao Zedong at the Tiananmen Gate, 1966. On August 18, 1966, Mao Zedong met with student Red Guards on Tiananmen, triggering a wave of mass killings in Beijing.
- Native name: 红八月
- Location: Beijing, China
- Date: 1966; August – September 1966
- Target: Teachers, intellectuals, members of the "Five Black Categories" (Landlords, wealthy peasants, bad influences/elements and right wingers), local political leaders and perceived political enemies of Mao Zedong
- Attack type: Politicide, politically motivated violence
- Deaths: 1,772–10,275 (deaths); 85,196 (families displaced)
- Victims: landlords, property owners, political dissidents, “class enemies”
- Perpetrators: Chinese Communist Party, Cultural Revolution Group (Chen Boda, Jiang Qing, Kang Sheng, Yao Wenyuan, Zhang Chunqiao, Wang Li, Xie Fuzhi) and student Red Guards incited by Mao Zedong
- Motive: Destruction of the "Four Olds (Old cultures, old customs, old habits and ideas) and Five Black Categories (Landlords, wealthy peasants, bad influences/elements and “right wingers”)

Red August (simplified Chinese: 红八月; traditional Chinese: 紅八月; pinyin: Hóng Bāyuè) is a term used to indicate a period of political violence and massacres in Beijing beginning in August 1966, during the Cultural Revolution. According to official statistics published in 1980 after the end of the Cultural Revolution, Red Guards in Beijing killed a total of 1,772 people during Red August, while 33,695 homes were ransacked and 85,196 families were forcibly displaced. However, according to official statistics published in November 1985, the number of deaths in Beijing during Red August was 10,275.

On August 18, 1966, Chairman Mao Zedong met with Song Binbin, a leader of the Red Guards, atop Tiananmen. This event instigated a wave of violence and mass killings in the city by the Red Guards, who also started a campaign to destroy the "Four Olds". The killings by the Red Guards also impacted several rural districts in Beijing, such as in the Daxing Massacre, in which 325 people were killed from August 27 to September 1 in the Daxing District of Beijing. Meanwhile, a number of people, including notable writers Lao She, Zhou Zuoren and Chen Mengjia, committed suicide or attempted suicide after being persecuted. During the massacres, Mao Zedong publicly opposed any governmental intervention against the student movement, and Xie Fuzhi, the Minister of Ministry of Public Security, instructed police and public security organizations to protect the Red Guards instead of arresting them. However, the situation had begun to spiral out of control by the end of August 1966, forcing the Central Committee of the Chinese Communist Party (CCP) and Chinese government to take multiple interventions which gradually brought the massacres to an end.

Red August is considered the origin of the Red Terror in the Chinese Cultural Revolution. It has also been compared with Nazi Germany's Kristallnacht, as well as with the Nanjing Massacre conducted by the Japanese military during the Second Sino-Japanese War. With the Sino-Soviet split in the 1960s, the Soviet Union ridiculed and criticized Mao's Cultural Revolution fiercely, and some publications in USSR and Eastern Bloc also compared Mao meeting Red Guards on Tiananmen to Adolf Hitler giving speeches to his supporters.

== History ==
=== Historical background ===
On May 16, 1966, Mao Zedong launched the Cultural Revolution in mainland, China. On 1 August 1966, the rights of teachers and students to form "mass organizations of the Cultural Revolution" were officially declared.

On August 5, Bian Zhongyun, the first vice principal of the Experimental High School Attached to Beijing Normal University, was beaten to death by a group of Red Guards—mostly her students—and became the first education worker in Beijing killed by the Red Guards.

=== Massacre in Beijing ===
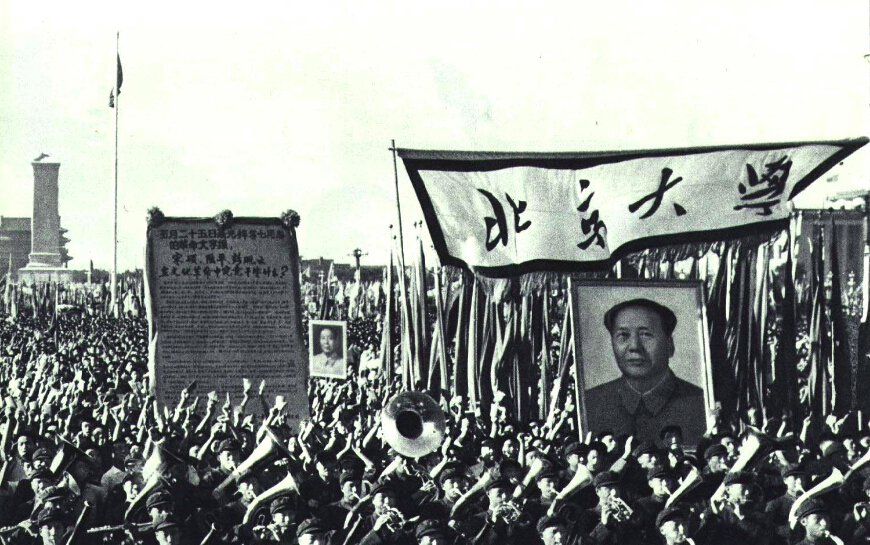
Red Guards from Peking University (September 1966)

On August 18, 1966, Mao Zedong met with Song Binbin, a leader of the Red Guards, atop Tiananmen of Beijing. Mao asked Song Binbin whether the "Bin" in her given name was the same Chinese character as that in Chinese idiom "Wen Zhi Bin Bin (文质彬彬)" meaning a person of culture; upon receiving confirmation, Mao commented that, "You'd better fight" (Yao Wu Ma 要武嘛), referring to the martial aspect as opposed to the cultural one. After this meeting, the morale of the Red Guards was significantly boosted, triggering their massive slaughter in Beijing. At the same time, Red Guards launched a nationwide campaign to destroy the "Four Olds". In Beijing alone, a total of 4,922 historic sites were ruined, and the Red Guards burned 2.3 million books as well as 3.3 million paintings, art objects, and pieces of furniture.

On August 22, 1966, Mao approved a document from the Ministry of Public Security, ordering "do not use police force—no exception—to intervene or suppress the movement of revolutionary students". On the following day, Mao gave a talk at a Work Conference of the Central Committee of CCP, publicly supporting the student movement and opposing any intervention to the "Cultural Revolution of students":

In my view, Peking is not all that chaotic. The students held a meeting of 100,000 and then captured the murderers. This caused some panic. Peking is too gentle. Appeals have been issued, [but after all] there are very few hooligans. Stop interfering for the time being. It is still too early to say anything definite about the reorganization of the center of the [Youth] League; let us wait four months. Decisions taken hurriedly can do only harm. Work teams were dispatched in a hurry; the left was struggled against in a hurry; meetings of 100,000 were called in a hurry; appeals were issued in a hurry; opposition to the new municipal [party] committee of Peking was said, in a hurry, to be tantamount to an opposition to the [party] Center. Why is it impermissible to oppose? I have issued a big character poster myself, 'Bombard the Headquarters!' Some problems have to be settled soon. For instance, the workers, peasants, and soldiers should not interfere with the students' great Cultural Revolution. Let the students go into the street. What is wrong with their writing big-character posters or going into the street? Let foreigners take pictures. They take shots to show aspects of our backward tendencies. But it does not matter. Let the imperialists make a scandal about us.

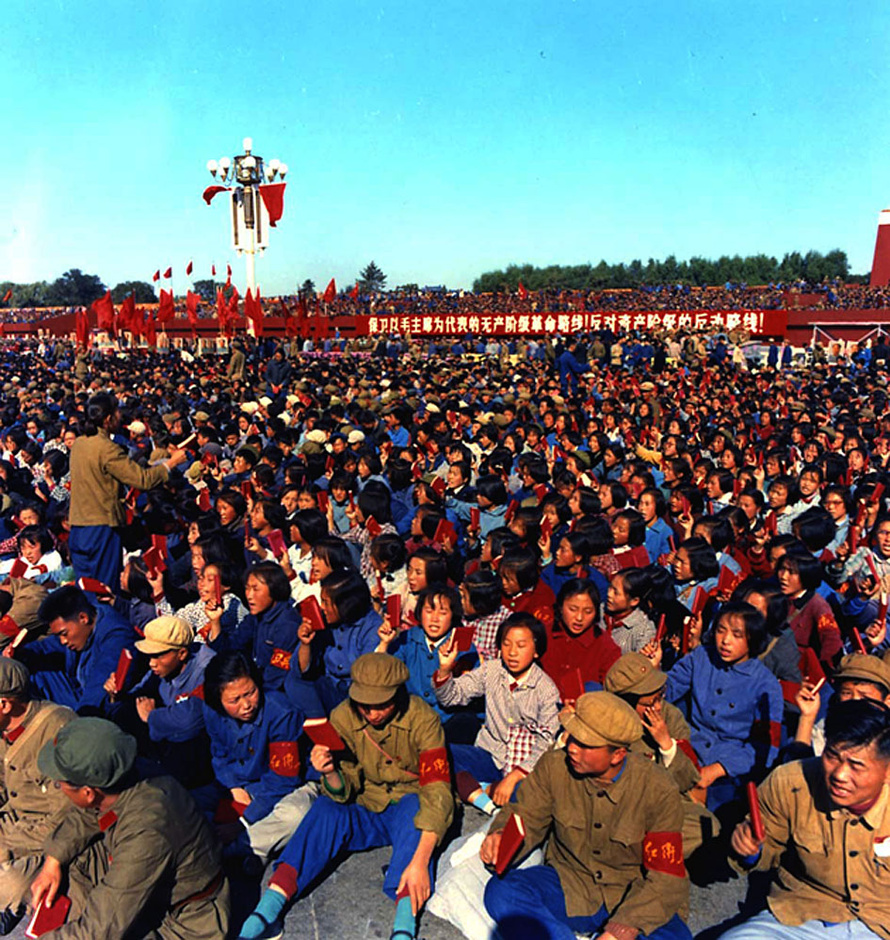
Red Guards on Tiananmen Square of Beijing (September 1966).

On August 25, 1966, thousands of Red Guards started a week-long massacre in Langan Market (榄杆市) of the Chongwen District. On August 26, Xie Fuzhi, the Minister of Ministry of Public Security, also ordered to protect the Red Guards and not arrest them, claiming that it was not incorrect for the Red Guards to beat "bad people" and it was fine if the "bad people" were killed. On the next day, Daxing Massacre broke out in the Daxing District of Beijing. And in his subsequent meetings with top public security officials from different provinces, Xie reiterated his point of view that the killings made by Red Guards were not public security issues and it would be a mistake if the public security was to arrest the Red Guards.

=== Government intervention ===
By the end of August 1966, the situation had grown out of control, forcing the Central Committee of CCP and the Chinese government to take multiple interventions, which gradually brought the massacres to an end. On September 5, People's Daily published an article (用文斗, 不用武斗) calling for an end to the violent combat and massacres.

Nevertheless, millions of Red Guards continued to arrive in Beijing to see Mao Zedong at Tiananmen Square on several occasions, including September 15, October 1 and so on.

== Killings and death toll ==
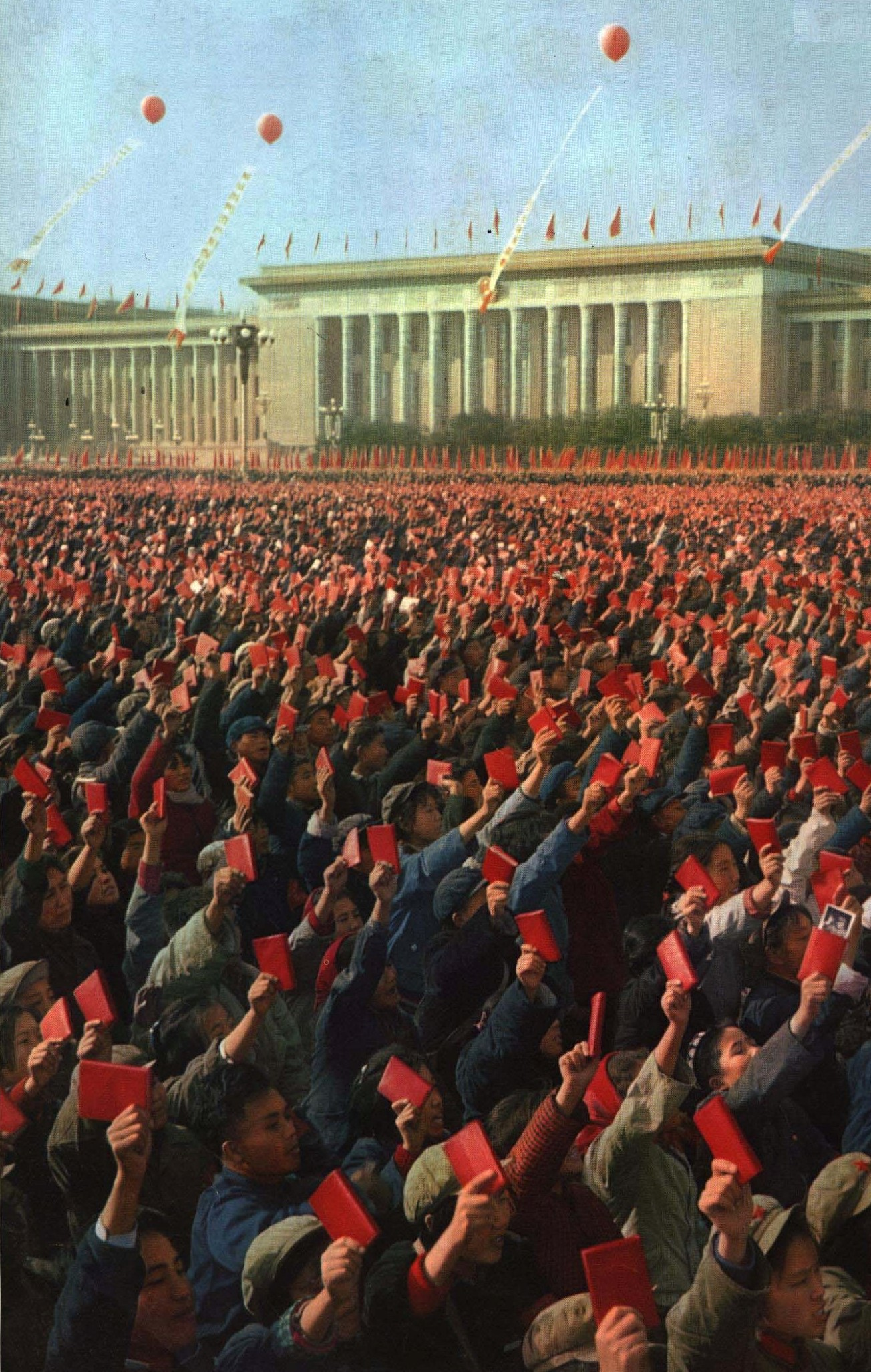
The rally of Red Guards on Tiananmen Square (1967). They were holding the "Little Red Book" containing quotations from Mao Zedong.

=== Methods of killing ===
During Red August, killing methods by the Red Guards included beating, torture, whipping, strangling, trampling, boiling, beheading and so on. In particular, the method used to kill most infants and children was knocking them against the ground or slicing them in half.

=== Death toll ===
- According to official statistics published in 1980, from August to September in 1966, a total of 1,772 people—including teachers and principals of many schools—were killed in Beijing by Red Guards, while 33,695 homes were ransacked and 85,196 families were forced to leave Beijing.
- During the Daxing Massacre, 325 people were killed from August 27 to September 1 in the Daxing District of Beijing. Even though most researchers think that the number of deaths in Daxing Massacre was already included in the total death toll in Beijing (i.e., 1,772), some researchers disagree and argue that the number of deaths in rural districts such as Daxing and Changping were not counted in the municipal data of Beijing. The oldest victim killed during the Daxing Massacre was 80 years old, while the youngest was only 38 days old; 22 families were wiped out.
- According to official statistics published in November 1985, the death toll during Red August was 10,275, while 92,000 homes were ransacked and 125,000 families were forced to leave Beijing.

== Aftermath and influence ==
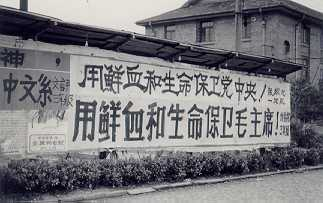
The Red Guards' political propaganda on the campus of Shanghai Fudan University: "Defend the Central Party Committee with blood and life! Defend Chairman Mao with blood and life!”.

Red August of Beijing is regarded as the origin of Red Terror in the Chinese Cultural Revolution, instigating Red Guards' movement in multiple cities including Shanghai, Guangzhou, Nanjing and Xiamen, where local political leaders, intellectuals, teachers and members of the Five Black Categories were persecuted and even killed by the Red Guards.

- In Beijing, Red Guards from Beijing No.6 High School established a private prison on campus, where they wrote "Long Live Red Terror!" on a wall using blood of the victims who they beat or even killed.
- In Shanghai, local Red Guards ransacked 84,222 houses of "bourgeois" families, and 1,231 of them were the homes of intellectuals or teachers. On September 3, 1966, notable translator Fu Lei and his wife committed suicide after being tortured and humiliated by Red Guards since the end of August. Red Guards from Beijing also travelled to Shanghai and participated in the local student movement, including violent struggles. For example, on September 15, eleven Red Guards from Beijing Foreign Studies University went to Shanghai and teamed up with Red Guards from Shanghai Foreign Language School, chanting "Long Live Red Terror" while persecuting 31 teachers in total.

There has been comparison between the date "18 August 1966", which was the key point during Red August, and the Kristallnacht, which was the prelude of Nazi Germany's Holocaust. Moreover, Red August along with the subsequent massacres across China during the Cultural Revolution has also been compared to the Nanjing Massacre conducted by the Japanese military during the Second Sino-Japanese War.

== See also ==
- Red Terror
- Five Black Categories
- Four Olds
- Mass killings under communist regimes
- List of massacres in China
- Daxing Massacre
- Mao Zedong's cult of personality
