= How the Red Sun Rose =

2000 book by Gao Hua

How the Red Sun Rose: The Origins and Development of the Yan'an Rectification Movement, 1930–1945
- Author: Gao Hua
- Translator: Guo Jian, Stacy Mosher
- Language: English
- Subject: History
- Genre: Non-fiction
- Publisher: Chinese University of Hong Kong Press
- Publication date: 2000 (Chinese version)
- Publication place: People's Republic of China
- English publication date: 2018
- Pages: 840 pages
- Awards: Honorable Mention, 2020 Joseph Levenson Post-1900 Book Prize
- ISBN: 9789629968229

How the Red Sun Rose: The Origins and Development of the Yan'an Rectification Movement, 1930–1945, is a history book written by Gao Hua and published by the Chinese University of Hong Kong Press in 2000. It documents the origins and consequences of the Yan'an Rectification Movement as well as the ascendance of Mao Zedong as the paramount leader of the Chinese Communist Party (CCP). The book is banned in the People's Republic of China.

Gao's book starts with Mao's elimination of the Anti-Bolshevik League and elaborates on the vicissitudes of Mao's career within the CCP, featuring his conflict with the Soviet-trained Wang Ming (1937–1941). After defeating Wang, Mao launched the Yan'an Rectification Movement (1942–1945)—the focus of Gao's book.

Gao's book moved scholarly understanding of the Yan'an Rectification Movement from the earlier Party-line narratives of Edgar Snow and other scholars. (Note: Chang 2019, pp. 898–901: "How the Red Sun Rose renders obsolete much of the earlier scholarship on Yan'an and Mao. ... Contemporary observers, such as Edgar Snow, and scholars who accepted Mao’s two-line struggle narrative were sold a bill of goods."; Kiely 2020, pp. 56–57: "this English version should finally demolish, for a global audience, whatever remains of the Edgar Snowian mythology of the CCP’s original moment of purity in Yan'an."; Bianco 2019, p. 150: "readers must concede that this book provides a model case study, that utterly renews and enlightens our knowledge of the so far largely misunderstood Yan'an Rectification Movement") The book's English version, translated by Stacy Mosher and Guo Jian and published in 2018, received the Joseph Levenson Post-1900 Book Prize's Honorable Mention in 2020.

== Background and publication history ==
The author, Gao Hua, was raised during China's Cultural Revolution. Gao's family came under scrutiny during the Red August of 1966, when Gao was a preteen. His father was forced to flee for fear of physical violence. Posters around Gao's hometown announced the violence he would witness. Many posters mentioned the purge of authors, artists, and thinkers during the Yan'an Rectification Movement.

Near Gao's home, a man in charge of a banned book warehouse let Gao read hundreds of banned books including essays and novels by Wang Shiwei and Ding Ling, authors who had been purged in Yan'an.

In 1978, Gao entered Nanjing University and knew that understanding the Rectification Movement was key to understanding the traumas China had gone through. He then began to gather historical materials. Twenty-two years later, in 2000, he published How the Red Sun Rose: The Origin and Development of the Yan'an Rectification Movement, 1930–45, for which Gao became known.

The English version of Gao's book was translated by Brooklyn editor and translator Stacy Mosher and University of Wisconsin-Whitewater English professor Guo Jian; their translation was published in 2018 by the Chinese University of Hong Kong Press.

== Summary ==
Mao enjoyed a period of cooperative relationship with the CCP Central Committee's delegation in Jiangxi during his campaign to eliminate the Anti-Bolshevik League. The campaign was a large internal purge initiated by Mao in 1930, (Note: The campaigns to eliminate the Anti-Bolshevik League and the Social Democrat Party in the Jiangxi-Fujian Soviet area resulted in over 10,000 deaths) triggering discontent that led to the Futian incident. The Central Committee delegation in Jiangxi declared the Futian incident counterrevolutionary, dismissed Xiang Ying's criticisms of the campaign, and resumed elimination of the Anti-Bolshevik League. From 1932 to 1934, Mao gradually lost power both in the military and the CCP. By September 1934, Mao was "completely excluded from the decision-making core".

Mao regained power after the 1935 Zunyi Conference but was again disadvantaged by Wang Ming's 1937 arrival from the Soviet Union. Wang advocated for cooperation with the Kuomintang (KMT) in the Second Sino-Japanese War, which Mao opposed; Mao worried that fighting the Empire of Japan would incur excessive losses to CCP forces and preferred to let Japanese armies weaken the KMT's forces instead. Initially thwarted by Wang's alliance with Zhou Enlai, Mao soon recovered: He ordered military leaders such as Zhu De and Peng Dehuai to lead the Eighth Route Army deep into Northern China to establish revolutionary base areas, resulting in the rapid expansion of CCP forces, (Note: Gao writes, "The Eighth Route Army grew from less than 30,000 men in September of 1937 to 250,000 men in autumn of 1938") while the KMT defended Wuhan against Japan and lost. Following Comintern head Georgi Dimitrov's verbal affirmation of Mao as leader of the CCP, Mao convened the Sixth Plenum of the Sixth Central Committee in which he assailed KMT's capitulationism and gained a major victory over Wang.

Following the disintegration of Wang's Comintern faction following the September 1941 Politburo meeting, Mao proceeded to launch the Yan'an Rectification Movement. Mao first had intellectuals attack dogmatism, i.e., his rivals. When the likes of Wang Shiwei called for equality and criticized Yan'an's hierarchical system, Mao began to denounce liberalism and turn repressive. (Note: According to Gao, Wang Shiwei and others were subsequently labeled as KMT secret agents, and "Wang’s crimes were steadily upgraded until by June 1942 he was wearing three caps: anti-Party element (soon promoted to 'ringleader of an anti-Party clique'), Trotskyite bandit, and KMT spy." Wang was executed in 1947.)

The Rectification Movement focus shifted to the cadre examination, anti-spy purges, and the emergency "rescue" campaign. The cadre examination in 1943 required every cadre to repeatedly write detailed personal and family histories, including all private thoughts and conversations. Their personal histories were then added to the personal dossier system, providing reasons for purges and spy classifications. In the emergency "rescue" campaign, politically targeted individuals had to repent their ways to the Party so that they could be saved and reborn as a proletarian revolutionary soldier. The campaign mainly targeted intellectuals and cadres who had worked in KMT-controlled areas. (Note: Other targets include those from exploiting class backgrounds, intellectuals arriving in Yan'an after the Second Sino-Japanese War, and those who had regularly expressed discontent, among others. According to Xu Xiangqian, the campaign at Kangda used a "face-off" method to identify enemy agents: "When a rally was held, [the cadre examination work group] would bring people in groups to stand on the stage, while those in the audience would stare in their faces. If a person’s face did not change color, that meant he had no problems; the rest were suspect and had to undergo investigation.") Each work unit had to produce a quota of enemies to target. To obtain confessions, schools, hospitals, and other work units strongarmed their targets with sleep and food deprivation, round-the-clock interrogation, 24 methods of torture, and fake executions. Some were also executed. Many acquiesced to these tactics and falsely implicated others. Gao cites Hu Qiaomu's memoir, which claimed that 15,000 secret agents were unearthed in Yan'an, a city with around 7,000 local residents and 30,000 CCP cadres in the 1940s. Some figures provided by Gao include 73 percent of Suide Normal School's students and staff, including a six-year old primary school student. The emergency rescue campaign halted after former Comintern leader Dimitrov intervened at the end of 1943.

Gao's book concludes with the Seventh Party Congress when Mao triumphed over his rivals in the CCP and held absolute power over the Party.

== Reception ==
Reprinted twenty-two times in traditional Chinese and nine times in simplified Chinese as of 2019, Gao's book has contributed to revising scholarly understanding of the Yan'an Rectification Movement. Whereas early scholarship subscribed to the idea that the Yan'an Rectification Movement was a "salubrious thought-reform process", Hong Kong University of Science and Technology professor David Chang wrote that How the Red Sun Rose has shown that process to be more violent and repressive. According to Chang, contemporary scholars who wrote positively of the CCP and Mao, such as Edgar Snow, were "sold a bill of goods", and Gao's book renders their work obsolete. In addition to reconstructing history erased by the CCP, Gao also "uncovered a pattern" of how the CCP has controlled public information throughout its existence. French historian Lucien Bianco states that Gao's case study renews scholarly understanding of the previously misunderstood Yan'an Rectification Movement. Jan Kiely, Professor of China Studies at the Chinese University of Hong Kong, states that "this English version should finally demolish, for a global audience, whatever remains of the Edgar Snowian mythology of the CCP’s original moment of purity in Yan'an."

Four reviewers of Gao's work, along with official CCP historians, criticize Gao's narrow focus on Mao's struggles with his rivals within the CCP and Gao's neglect of other aspects of history. Writing for Radio Free Asia, Beijing Spring editor Hu Ping, himself a Chinese dissident, acknowledges Gao's book as a classic in the study of the CCP's history but criticizes the book's overemphasis on Mao and underanalysis of the CCP's role. He comments that in order for the "red sun" to rise, there needs to be a leader like Mao, but without a Party like the CCP, even with Mao, the red sun would not be able to rise. Professor Emeritus at the University of California, San Diego, Joseph W. Esherick, faults Gao for speculating on Mao's motivations rather than using direct sources. Esherick also shares the critique of official CCP historians that Gao overemphasized Mao's intra-party struggles and left out other aspects of the revolutionary history. Kiely says the Gao's work is "imbricated with Maoist terminology" and has a scope limited to the top levels of the CCP due to his reliance on Party documents. Kiely adds that due to the CCP's filtering of documents released to the public and its rewriting of CCP history, Gao's work may eventually be recognized only for pointing future research to another direction while the fuller history has yet to be discovered. Harvard University international affairs professor Tony Saich praised Gao's "remarkable detective work" with his limited sources, but felt that Gao's focus on Mao's inner-CCP struggles made readers less aware of broader historical contexts including the United Front with the KMT in the Second Sino-Japanese War.

In 2020, the English version of Gao's book won the Joseph Levenson Post-1900 Book Prize's Honorable Mention. Even though Gao's book's publication date did not satisfy the Prize's criteria, the Prize's committee stated that his work profoundly influenced people's understanding of the Chinese Communist Revolution and decided to give the prize for the first time to a twenty-year-old publication; Gao was also the first mainland Chinese scholar to have received the prize.

== Notes and references ==
Notes
