= Ten Major Relationships =

1956 speech by Mao Zedong

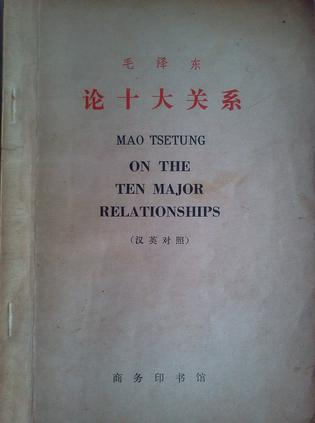
The book cover of the bilingual version of On the Ten Major Relationships published as a single volume.

On the Ten Major Relationships (simplified Chinese: 论十大关系; traditional Chinese: 論十大關係; pinyin: lùn shídà guānxì) is a speech by Mao Zedong which outlines how the People's Republic of China would construct socialism different from the model of development undertaken by the Soviet Union. It was delivered by Mao during an enlarged session of a Politburo meeting of the Chinese Communist Party on April 25, 1956, and further elaborated in the 7th Supreme State Conference on May 2 the same year.

In official account, the speech is celebrated as the landmark of the search for an alternative mode of socialist development that fit the specific conditions in China and it also marks the beginning of Mao's denouncement of the Soviet Union in the late 1950s. In fewer than 13,000 words in Chinese (10,000 in English translation), Mao stressed that China had to avoid repeating "certain defects and errors that occurred in the course of their [the Soviet Union] building socialism." Covered in the speech are the economic, social, political, and ethnical aspects of building socialism in China. Mao further charted a strategy of forming alliance and splitting enemies in international sphere.

The speech was made in front of the party secretaries of various provinces, autonomous regions, and municipalities, and was subsequently circulated among the middle and top cadres for political study. It was not published until after Mao's death in September 1976.

== Background ==
In January 1956 Mao Zedong noticed that Liu Shaoqi was receiving reports from some committees of the State Council and became interested in those reports. Beginning from late last year, Liu was preparing for the political report for the forthcoming party congress and Mao then instructed to arrange different bureaus to report to him. As Mao said, the formulation of the ten major relationships was the result of communicating with the cadres in those bureaus.

From February 14 to April 24 (1956), Mao listened to the reports from 34 different bureaus, plus the report from the State Planning Commission on the Second Five-year Plan. During those 41 days, Mao listened to reports for four to five hours every day in Zhongnanhai. Other top leaders including Zhou Enlai, Liu Shaoqi, Chen Yun, and Deng Xiaoping had also participated in these meetings and expressed their opinions. The reporting began with heavy industry, then proceeded to light industry, handicraft industry, transportation and telecommunication, agriculture and forestry, finance, and other areas. During the same period, Mao was also involved in the drafting of another document titled "On the Historical Experience of the Dictatorship of the Proletariat" (关于无产阶级专政的历史经验), which, published on April 5 on the People's Daily, was an immediate response of the Chinese Communist Party to the 20th Congress of the Communist Party of the Soviet Union.

After listening to the first round of reports, from April 12 to 17 Mao visited an exhibition of mechanics to see the latest development in the industry. Then from April 18 onwards, Li Fuchun reported to Mao on the Second Five-year Plan. The entire process was Mao's longest and most comprehensive investigation on economic affairs after 1949. In the enlarged Politburo meeting from April 25 to 28, Mao made the speech on its first day. As the original agenda was about issues like agricultural cooperative, attendants did not expect Mao to make such a speech on the ten major relationships and it became the focus for the rest of the meeting.

=== Domestic sphere ===
After the founding of the new country in 1949, the party had consolidated its control over Chinese society through mass campaigns like Land Reform (1947–1952), the Campaign to Suppress Counterrevolutionaries (1950–1953), the Three-Anti and Five-Anti Campaigns (1951–1952), the Campaign to Resist U.S. Aggression and Aid Korea (1950–1953), and the Sufan Movement (1955). The government also completed the Ethnic Classification in 1954 which aimed at sorting and categorizing the hundreds of distinct ethnic communities within the country, the result of which served as the basis for future policy on nationalities.

In terms of economic development, China had followed the Soviet model of socialism ever since Mao's decision to lean on the side of the Soviet Union. As his speech "On the People's Democratic Dictatorship" (论人民民主专政) in June 1949 states,

"We must learn to do economic work from all who know how, no matter who they are. We must esteem them as teachers, learning from them respectfully and conscientiously. We must not pretend to know when we do not know. We must not put on bureaucratic airs. If we dig into a subject for several months, for a year or two, for three or five years, we shall eventually master it. At first some of the Soviet Communists also were not very good at handling economic matters and the imperialists awaited their failure too. But the Communist Party of the Soviet Union emerged victorious and, under the leadership of Lenin and Stalin, it learned not only how to make the revolution but also how to carry on construction. It has built a great and splendid socialist state. The Communist Party of the Soviet Union is our best teacher and we must learn from it. The situation both at home and abroad is in our favour, we can rely fully on the weapon of the people's democratic dictatorship, unite the people throughout the country, the reactionaries excepted, and advance steadily to our goal."

Following Mao's visit to Moscow from late 1949 to early 1950, on February 14, 1950, the two countries signed the Sino-Soviet Treaty of Friendship, Alliance and Mutual Assistance (中苏友好同盟互助条约) which promised the Soviet Union's commitment to help build socialism in the newly founded People's Republic of China. From 1950 to 1956, a total of 5,092 Soviet experts were sent to China for technical assistant and the total number of visits of the Soviet experts was over 18,000 throughout the years. The areas they provided assistance included government bureaus, military, large enterprises, and higher institutions. In the countryside, from late 1955 to early 1956, China's agricultural sector completed the Socialist High Tide, transforming from having only 14.2% (16.9 million out of 120 million) of peasant families collectivized to 91.2% of them joining the co-operatives and 61.9% joining collectives. Likewise in the cities, private factories and shops were either turned into cooperatives or nationalized in the name of joint public-private ownership.

=== International sphere ===
Regarding to the Soviet Union's leadership in the socialist camp, the Tito-Stalin Split broke out in 1948, followed by the Informbiro period that ended at 1955, signaling the end of the Soviet Union's intolerance of alternative socialist development. In Moscow, a dramatic event happened during the 20th Congress of the Communist Party of the Soviet Union in February 1956, as Nikita Khrushchev made the "Secret Speech" of denouncing the personality cult and dictatorship of Joseph Stalin. Chinese Communist Zhu De and Deng Xiaoping attended the congress and were surprised by the length that Khrushchev went into denouncing Stalin. Furthermore, the Soviet Union had begun to implement its 6th Five-year Plan for 1956–1960. On the geopolitical scene, China had since 1954 began to foster relations with her Asian neighboring countries like India and Burma. In April 1955, the Bandung Conference was held in Bandung, Indonesia and Zhou Enlai attended the conference as the representative of the PRC, strengthening its role in the African and Asian continents.

== Content ==
Mao Zedong summarized the issues related to socialist construction and transformation into ten major relationships. To avoid the mistakes that the Soviet Union had made, Mao urged to mobilize the "positive elements" of the country, which were the peasants and workers, and turned the "negative elements" of reactionaries as far as possible into positive. Internationally "forces that can be united" were positive whilst reactionary forces were negative. The following are the synopses of the ten relationships, many of which were Mao's urge for balanced development and open criticism of the situations in the Soviet Union and Eastern European countries.

=== Relationship between heavy industry on one hand and light industry and agriculture on the other ===
Mao was concerned about the speed of capital accumulation and the production of the means of production. He was of the opinion that China was on the right course of balancing heavy industry on one hand, and light industry and agriculture on the other. Unlike in the Soviet Union and some Eastern European countries, where the disequilibrium resulted in "a shortage of goods on the market and an unstable currency", the supply of grain, raw materials, and daily necessities were stable in China. He urged to increase the investment in agriculture and light industry so that the accumulation of capital could be enhanced for the development of heavy industry.

=== Relationship between industry in the coastal regions and industry in the interior ===
The focus of this part is the balance between the development in the coastal regions and interior regions, which Mao considered free from major mistakes. Yet he urged to give greater attention to development in coastal regions, because the military threat posed by the United States had subsided and it would be unwise to abandon the coastal regions. He also mentioned in the interior regions industry should be gradually built.

=== Relationship between economic construction and defense construction ===
Similar to last part, Mao suggested that the threat posed by the United States since the Korean War had subsided and the Chinese armed forces had grown. Though China did not yet have the atom bomb, they would be able to possess it soon. Hence he urged lowering military and administrative expenses in favor of economic construction, which would eventually lead to investment in defense construction.

=== Relationship between the state, the units of production, and the producers ===
As for the relationship between the state and society, Mao urged for more openness and delegation of powers to the individual units of production and producers. Workers should be given improved working conditions and welfare, and increased and more equal wages as a reward for their political consciousness and over-fulfillment of production quotas. Factories should also been given more autonomy in operation. Unlike in the Soviet Union where peasants were exploited heavily by the state, China had a good relation with the peasants, though the Chinese Communist Party made a huge purchase of grain despite the floods in 1954 which made the peasants disgruntled. The policies of low agricultural tax, purchasing agricultural productions at standard prices, and subsidizing the grain sale to grain-deficient areas prevented China from making the mistakes the Soviet Union had made.

=== Relationship between the central and the local authorities ===
Mao stated that because of the complex situation of China's large population and vast scale, it was better to have both strong central and strong local governments than only a strong central government (as Mao described the Soviet Union). Mao stated that China should not be like the USSR, which Mao described as having a central government that was not flexible enough for local governments to operate. Though the incidents of Gao Gang and Rao Shushi in 1953 reminded the danger of local leaders having too much power, "provided that the policies of the central authorities are not violated, the local authorities may work out rules, regulations and measures in the light of their specific conditions and the needs of their work, and this is in no way prohibited by the Constitution."

=== Relationship between the Han nationality and the minority nationalities ===
Mao said that Han chauvinism must be opposed.

=== Relationship between Party and non-Party ===
This part is the most liberal of the ten major relationships, as Mao opined that the existence of other political parties could serve the party well by providing supervision. Though democratic parties were composed of the national bourgeoisies and intellectuals, they offered "well-intentioned criticisms." Even if the criticism was abusive, the party could refute by rational responses. Mao then envisioned the disappearance of the party, as the Marxist theory suggested the coming of a stateless society when communism is achieved, and even though a coercive party was needed to suppress counter-revolutionaries, he proposed to streamline the party and the bureaucracy.

=== Relationship between revolution and counter-revolution ===
Though counter-revolutionaries were negative factor, thanks to the policy of the party, some of them had stopped opposing the revolution. Whilst affirming the necessity of suppressing the counter-revolutionaries campaign in the early 1950s, Mao distanced himself from the Great Purge of Stalin and insisted that counter-revolutionaries like Hu Feng still existed and hence execution was needed in some cases to safeguard socialism and the dictatorship of the proletariat.

=== Relationship between right and wrong ===
In this section Mao focused on those who made mistakes in the past, which include "dogmatists headed by Wang Ming" who led the party "picking up the bad aspect of Stalin's style of work". Mao used Lu Xun's "The True Story of Ah Q" to illustrate it was "bad either to bar people outside the Party from the revolution or to prohibit erring comrades inside the Party from making amends." He suggested to observe those Communists who had erred but not those "who cling to their mistakes and fail to mend their ways after repeated admonition".

=== Relationship between China and other countries ===
In the tenth point, Mao emphasized the importance of "learning the strengths of all peoples and all countries."

Mao viewed the policy of learning from the other countries (implying the Soviet Union) had been right so far. Yet since that every nation had its weak points, China "mustn't copy everything indiscriminately and transplant mechanically" and "pick up their shortcomings and weak points." The Chinese Communists must be able to discern what were the strong or bad points from other countries to pick up. He used the example of the setting of a Ministry of Culture and a Bureau of Cinematography, instead of a Ministry of Cinematography and a Bureau of Culture like the case of the Soviet Union, to illustrate the importance of making a decision that best fitted the situations of China.

Regarding to the denouncement of the cult of personality of Stalin in the Soviet Union, Mao said that the "assessment of 30 per cent for mistakes and 70 per cent for achievements" for Stalin was "just about right." He then recounted the history of Wang Ming's "left adventurism" and "right opportunism" in the early history of the Chinese Communist Party which could be traced back to Stalin. In terms of socialist construction, Mao warned against the dogmatic following of Marxism–Leninism and applied their doctrines creatively.

Lastly, Mao summed up the two weaknesses of China, one being the lack of confidence among the people due to its colonial and semi-colonial past and the imperialist encroachment, and another being the delay of revolution which came only in 1949, four decades after the 1911 Revolution.

== Influence ==
In Mao Zedong's own works, "in the first eight years we copied foreign experiences, but since the ten major relationships was proposed in 1956, [the party] had found a path suitable for China." The speech was credited for setting the tone for the 8th National Congress of the Chinese Communist Party to be held in the second half of 1956, the first national congress after the founding of the new country in 1949. During the drafting process for the political report for the congress, Mao's original idea was to set "anti-rightist conservative thought" as the guiding thought. After the speech was delivered, the ten major relationships became the guiding thought instead and it was followed up by Liu Shaoqi, Hu Qiaomu, and other top leaders in their preparation for the congress. During the congress Zhou Enlai reported on the proposal for the Second Five-year Plan (1956–1962) and issues highlighted by Mao in the speech, like the ratio of investment between heavy and light industries and decentralization, were addressed.

After the speech was distributed to local level, "bearing in mind lessons drawn from the Soviet Union" was understood differently. In early 1957, it was reported that many local units began to lose enthusiasm in Soviet experts, did not learn from them, and even became rude to them. Soviet experts were not assigned works and leaders in some bureaus did not form a close relationship with them. Some bureaucrats even refused to work with them. In response, the experts reported back to Moscow their observations and dissatisfaction with the Chinese counterparts.

Ten Major Relationships, along with On the Correct Handling of Contradictions among the People, was an important part of the theoretical efforts to incorporate Marxism into the Chinese context and China's efforts to develop socialism.

== Analysis ==
=== Soviet model of development and Sino-Soviet relations ===
Many considered the speech the beginning of Mao's disagreement with the Soviet path of socialist development. Political scientist Frederick C. Teiwes believes that the thorough investigation of China's situations in 1956 had urged top Chinese leaders to examine the shortcomings of the Soviet model critically and raise doubt about its applicability in China. Despite having a more mature industrial base, the Soviet economy grew slower than the Chinese one. A central change effected by the speech was the ratio of investment between heavy industry on one hand and light industry and agriculture on the other. In June 1956, the ratio of heavy industry to light industry was reduced from 8:1 to 7:1 and a few months later the proposed investment in agriculture had also increased from 7% to 10%. Also, the State Council planned to decentralize the administration of economic organizations and the use of indirect planning and market mechanisms were proposed and experimented in late 1956. Yet the attempt was soon curtailed because of the difficulties involved and opposition from economic planners.

Teiwes reminds that the Soviet Union themselves had also tried to decentralize in mid-1955 and it contributed to China's reaction. An instance of such influence was the use of Soviet machine tractor for spreading the mechanization of agriculture but it was questioned by the Chinese side due to its insufficiency. Another instance was that the "one-man management" factory system, which placed authority in the hands of the factory manager, was never able to gain prominence in China except in the Northeast where the Soviet influence was strongest. Both practices were graduately abandoned by the Soviet Union.

Economist Chris Bramall believes that the period between April 1956 and June 1957 was Mao at his most conservative and the speech reinstated Mao's economic policy of balanced development which was different from the Soviet emphasis on heavy industry. However, historian Shen Zhihua suggests that for adjusting the ratio of investment between heavy and light industries, altering the plan for industrial development, and improving people's living standard, Mao's development strategy in the speech did not differed significantly from the one in Khrushchev's speech made in the party congress in the same year and their 6th Five-year Plan as well. In Shen's view, China and the Soviet Union were both searching for the path for furthering socialist development.

=== Mao's view on the state purchase of grain ===
In part four, Mao said that the party "did make a mistake on the question of grain." In 1954, a decrease in production was accompanied by an increase in state purchase, making the peasants "disgruntled, and there were a lot of complaints both inside and outside the Party." In 1955, the amount of grain purchased by the state decreased and there was a good harvest, reversing the peasants' opinion on the party. In historian Yang Kuisong's analysis, in the 1950s Mao was actually deeply concerned about the livelihood of peasants but his view on the state purchase of grain and the burden exerted on peasants changed gradually from considering to exploitative because of two factors: 1) the implementation of the First Five-year plan in 1953, and 2) the overall and long-term benefit of the state.

Figures on the grain shortage in spring (春荒)
Year	Population affected (in million)	Unnatural death
1950	4,920	7,995
1951	2,093	2,713
1952	2,388	948
1953	3,824	263
1954	2,443	475
1955	6,992	1,477
1956	2,014	10,012
1957	4,134	273
1958	1,979	57,761

The state collection of grain had been a strenuous issue for the new regime considering the fact that the Second Sino-Japanese War and the Chinese Civil War had caused a devastating effect on the country's economic activities. In the early 1950s, there were already incidents of peasants committing suicide or resisting the state collection despite Chen Yun's urge of caution. As seen from the official figures, grain shortage in spring (春荒) might not be the most direct cause of unnatural death, as years with higher shortage could actually have fewer unnatural death. Instead, natural disaster and the state purchase of grain were what exerted burden on the peasants. After 1949, the state purchase of grain had been on the rise and the increase was the most prominent after the implementation of the state monopoly in 1953. In 1956–1967, the figure dropped and it did not increase until the Great Leap Forward.

Mao himself had directly intervened the policy on state purchase of grain in the early 1950s, requesting to lower the amount of grain to be purchased, so as to lighten the burden on peasants. During the period, the shortage of grain for peasants was a serious problem for the state which tried to maintain a low ratio of 30% in the purchase of grain. Chen Yun advocated a higher purchase ratio, which was opposed to Mao's view of maintaining a low ratio, as he knew that placing too much pressure on peasants would be counterproductive.

Figures on the production and state purchase of grain
Year	Total production (in 100 million cattie)	State purchase (in 100 million cattie)	State purchase as a percentage of total production (in %)
1950-1951	2,642.6	605	22.8
1951-1952	2,873.8	825.6	28.2
1952-1953	3,278.4	841	25.7
1953-1954	3,336.6	1,003	30.1
1954-1955	3,390.4	1,078	31.8
1955-1956	3,678.8	1,041	28.3
1956-1957	3,855	994	25.7
1957-1958	3,901	1,038.3	26.6
1958-1959	4000	1,161.6	29

But from 1953 onwards, Mao agreed with the view of economic planners and supported the state monopoly of the purchasing and marketing of grain. As the state monopoly was imposed, the state now had a better understanding of the amount of grain in the hands of peasants and in 1953, a total of 825 billion catties of grain was purchased, higher than the planned 708 billion. Emboldened by this increase, Chen Yun increased the amount even higher in 1954. The only concern for the planners was whether such increased led to massive death of peasants, which in 1955 a higher number of unnatural deaths was indeed recorded. Other than Internal Reference, Mao also knew about the problem from the democrats who wrote to Mao to report the severity of increased state purchase. As a response, Mao instructed Chen Yun to lower the purchase and for 1955 and a lower amount was purchased.

=== Mao's view on personality cult ===
In part ten Mao mentioned that "in the Soviet Union, those who once extolled Stalin to the skies have now in one swoop consigned him to purgatory. Here in China some people are following their example." Shen Zhihua suggests that the criticism of personality cult of Stalin led to the removal of Mao Zedong Thought from the 8th party congress. The party constitution in the congress did not mention Mao Zedong Thought and all top party leaders did not mention it as well, which was different from the party constitution in the last congress which stated Mao Zedong Thought as one of the guiding principles, alongside Marxism and Leninism, for the Chinese Communist Revolution. Since Mao himself had more than once opposed the use of the term in internal communication, so its removal in the 8th party congress did not necessarily indicate that Mao's status had been challenged as argued by some historians like Roderick MacFarquhar.

Though the trend of anti-personality cult was prevalent in the socialist camp after 1953, Shen argues that Mao only opposed the public use of Mao Zedong Thought, but not saw it as a problem itself. Hu Qiaomu explained that not mentioning Mao Zedong Thought was related to the Soviet Union who refused to accept the idea. And since China still relied on the Soviet Union in the early 1950s, so that was Mao's policy to downplay the idea. The Soviet-Yugoslavia conflict in 1948 had signaled that Stalin would not tolerate alternative socialist path and the Soviet Union remained dominant in the socialist world. After Stalin's death in 1953, however, the pressure from the Soviet Union lessened, yet Mao still had not put forward the use of Mao Zedong Though publicly because of the possible backlash due to the anti-personality cult in the Soviet Union. The development led to the concerns from top Chinese leaders. After the 20th Soviet party congress, personality cult became an even more sensitive issue and invited the speculation of whether there was personality cult in China. At local level, cadres started to raise doubt about the excessive praise given to Mao and internationally socialist countries also became cautious about personality cult. Yet the personal worship of Mao within the party already began in the Yan'an era, so it had a long historical root in the party. Though the criticism of Stalin relieved Mao of the pressure from the Soviet Union, it also made the personality cult of his own problematic. That is the reason why he highlighted that "in China some people are following their example" as a reminder that Mao was supportive of his own cult, but critical of that of Stalin.

== Subsequent development ==
Chris Bramall opines that in actual practice Mao did not follow what he stated in the speech and such view was echo by columnist Li Kwok-sing who claims that "China has never followed the theory of the ten relationship." During and immediately after the Great Leap Forward, Mao went further on the repudiation of the Soviet development model through thoroughly criticizing two Soviet books, Political Economy: A Textbook and Stalin's Economic Problems of Socialism in the USSR.

As for the development of the interior regions and defense construction, in response to the military threat posed by the escalation of the Vietnam War and the Sino-Soviet split in the 1960s, China had significantly increased the investment in the interior regions through the Third Front construction projects. Eventually China developed her own nuclear weapons in the mid-1960s.

In 1995 Jiang Zemin delivered a speech on "twelve major relationships" of socialist development, echoing what Mao had stressed nearly 40 years earlier, though much less significance was attached to the speech. Jiang's twelve relationships overlap with some of Mao's.

A comparison between the major relationships of Mao and Jiang
	Mao's ten major relationships		Jiang's twelve major relationships
1	between heavy industry on one hand, and light industry and agriculture on the other	1	between reform, revolution, and stability
2	between industry in the coastal regions and industry in the interior	2	between speed and effectiveness
3	between economic construction and defense construction	3	between economic construction on one hand, and population, resources, environment one the other
4	between the state, the units of production, and the producers	4	between the primary, second, and tertiary sectors
5	between the central and the local authorities	5	between the eastern region and the central-western region
6	between the Han nationality and the minority nationalities	6	between market mechanism and macro control
7	between Party and non-Party	7	between the state economy and other economies
8	between revolution and counter-revolution	8	between state, enterprises, and individual under income distribution
9	between right and wrong	9	between open outward expansion and preserving self-sufficiency
10	between China and other countries	10	between central and local
		11	between defense construction and economic construction
		12	between constructing material civilization and constructing spiritual civilization

== Circulation and edition ==
"On the Ten Major Relationships" and "On the Correct Handling of Contradictions among the People" (关于正确处理人民内部矛盾的问题) were two important speeches that Mao delivered after 1949. The latter, delivered in February 1957, was revised by Mao himself and soon published on People's Daily in June the same year, but the former was only circulated among the middle and top cadres and remained unpublished until after Mao's death.

Contrary to his usual practice of editing his own drafts, Mao had left the speech untouched after 1956. In 1965, Liu Shiqi suggested to Mao the publication of the speech due to its importance but Mao was dissatisfied with it and opined that further revision was needed. It remained for circulation among cadres only and was not for publication. In December, the party central instructed cadres to study the speech and express their views on it. In summer 1975, Deng Xiaoping directed the editorial work of the fifth volume of the Selected Works of Mao Zedong and suggested the inclusion of the speech. A further revision of the draft based on the original sound recording was prepared. After reading the revised draft, Mao agreed with its part-wide distribution, but still not its publication.

Mao had twice commented on the importance of the speech, in 1958 and 1960 respective, each stressing the search for alternative socialist development. Yet in other occasions, Mao did not value it as highly. In September 1956 when he received the representatives from Yugoslavia, he said that for the speech he just summarized others' opinions and that was not his own creation. In May 1957, he mentioned that if he was not satisfied with some drafts even after revision, they would remained unpublished, indicating that the speech was not up to his standard.

Other than the quality of the draft of the speech, another possible reason is the timing of political events. When Liu Shaoqi approached Mao in December 1965, Mao had already approved the criticism of the historical drama Hai Rui Dismissed from Office which was considered the preparation for initiating the Cultural Revolution. The major contents of the speech were on economic issues which were different from the anti-revisionism of the Cultural Revolution and hence Mao did not agree to publish the speech. In 1975 when Deng Xiaoping approached Mao, Deng was restoring the previous practices and negating the Cultural Revolution and for the same reason Mao again disagreed to publish the speech.

During the 2nd National Convention for Learning from Dazhai in Agriculture held in December 1976, the speech was chosen as a learning document. On the last day of the meeting, the article was published on People's Daily in full text and a nationwide learning campaign followed. The speech was also included in the fifth volume of Mao's Selected Works, with the following editorial:

"Bearing in mind lessons drawn from the Soviet Union, Comrade Mao Tsetung summed up China's experience, dealt with ten major relationships in socialist revolution and socialist construction and set forth the ideas underlying the general line of building socialism with greater, faster, better and more economical results, a line suited to the conditions of our country."

The published edition in 1976 contained contented which were omitted from the internal edition in 1965, including the criticism on the handling of heavy and light industries and agricultural sector of the Soviet Union and Eastern European countries, the criticism of Stalin, and other critiques. But the 1976 edition also did not contain all the contents from the speech in 1965.

== See also ==
- New Democracy
- On Contradiction
- On Practice
- Third Front

== Bibliography ==
- Bernstein, Thomas P. and Hua-yu Li, eds. China Learns from the Soviet Union, 1949-Present. Lanham: Lexington Books, 2010.
- Bramall, Chris. Chinese Economic Development. London: Routledge, 2009.
- Li, Kwok-sing. A Glossary of Political Terms of the People's Republic of China. Hong Kong: Chinese University Press, 1995.
- MacFarquhar, Roderick. The Origins of the Cultural Revolution: Volume 1 Contradictions among the People, 1956-1957. New York: Columbia University Press, 1974.
- MacFarquhar, Roderick. ed. The Politics of China: The Eras of Mao and Deng. Cambridge: Cambridge University Press, 1997.
- Thomas, Mullaney. Coming to Terms with the Nation: Ethnic Classification in Modern China. California: University of California Press, 2010.
- Walker, Kenneth R. "Collectivisation in Retrospect: The 'Socialist High Tide' of Autumn 1955-Spring 1956". The China Quarterly. Apr. - Jun., 1966. 26: 1–43.
- 沈志华。《苏联专家在中国(1948–1960)》。北京：中国国际广播出版社，2003。
- 沈志華。《思考與選擇──從知識分子會議到反右派運動（1956-1957）》。香港：香港中文大學當代中國文化研究中心，2008。
- 杨奎松。〈从"小仁政"到"大仁政"——新中国成立初期毛泽东与中央领导人在农民粮食问题上的态度异同与变化〉。《开放时代》。6(2013): 163–90。
