= Campaign to Suppress Counterrevolutionaries =

1950–1953 Chinese political repression campaign

- 鎮壓反革命運動; Part of the Cold War in Asia
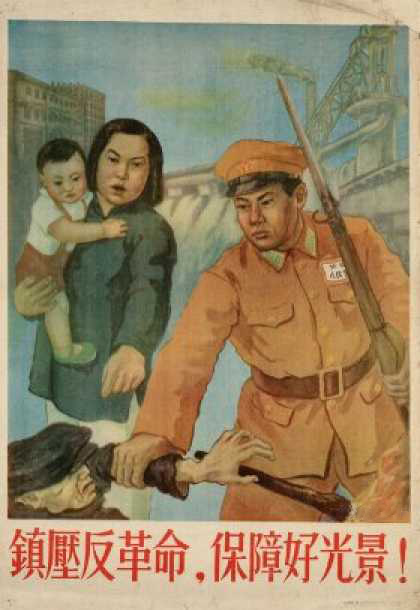
- A poster promoting the campaign, 1951
- Date: 1950–1953
- Location: China
- Methods: Capital punishment Arrest
- Result: 712,000 - 2,000,000 people executed; 1,290,000 people imprisoned; 1,200,000 people subject to control at various times

Parties
| Republic of China remaining forces: (Taiwan) Republic of China Armed Forces; KMT spies; Secret societies and gangs: White Lotus; Gelaohui; Yiguandao | China: Chinese Communist Party; Ministry of Public Security; Mao Zedong; Liu Shaoqi; Luo Ruiqing; Xu Zirong |

Number
| 3,000,000 | |

The Campaign to Suppress Counterrevolutionaries (Chinese: 鎮壓反革命運動; pinyin: zhènyā fǎngémìng yùndòng, abbreviated as 鎮反; zhènfǎn) was the first campaign of political repression launched by the People's Republic of China designed to eradicate opposition elements, especially former Kuomintang (KMT) functionaries accused of trying to undermine the new Chinese Communist Party government. It began in March 1950 when the Central Committee of the Chinese Communist Party issued the Directive on elimination of bandits and establishment of revolutionary new order (剿滅土匪，建立革命新秩序), and ended in 1953.

The campaign was implemented as a response to the rebellions that were commonplace in the early years of the People's Republic of China. Those targeted during the campaign were thereafter labeled as counterrevolutionaries, and were publicly denounced in mass trials. Significant numbers of counterrevolutionaries were arrested and executed and even more sentenced to labor reform (勞動改造; láodòng gǎizào). According to the official statistics from the Chinese Communist Party (CCP) and the Chinese government in 1954, at least 2.6 million people were arrested in the campaign, some 1.3 million people were imprisoned, and 712,000 people were executed. Scholars and researchers either accept the numbers of the executions, or give their own estimates ranging from 500,000 to 1 or 2 million.

== Background ==
Professor Yang Kuisong noted the strong resistance against the Communist government during the early days of the People's Republic of China, mostly from remnants of the KMT. According to Chinese state media, after the victory of the CCP in the Chinese Civil War, remnants of the Kuomintang continued to gather intelligence, conduct sabotage, destroy transportation links, loot supplies, and entice armed rebellion through bandits and secret agents.

According to Chinese historians, between January and October 1950, there were over 800 counterrevolutionary riots nationwide, and that more than 40,000 political activists and masses of cadres were killed as a result. The government alleged that in Guangxi Province alone, counterrevolutionaries burned and destroyed more than 25,000 buildings and robbed over 200,000 head of cattle.

In March 1950, the CCP Central Committee issued "Counter-Revolutionary Activities and instructions for Repression." Starting from December 1950, the large-scale suppression of the counterrevolutionary movement was carried out. The official focus of the campaign were bandits (such as Guan Fei), as well as counterrevolutionary underground bands.

== Initial campaign ==
The campaign focused primarily on eliminating underground KMT agents, and also on eliminating secret societies, criminal gangs, and religious sects.

In March 1950, Liu Shaoqi, who was then in charge of the Central Committee, had issued a "Directive on elimination of bandits and establishment of revolutionary new order", ordering the Public Security Department (公安局) to list all the Kuomintang members, and stressed that whoever was opposing the rule of CCP must be heavily suppressed and punished. As a result, numerous former KMT members were forced to register and identify themselves, and were promised leniency as a result.

However, this initiative was criticized for being too lenient by many government officials, who called for harsher measures. In particular, Peng Zhen argued that KMT agents took advantage of the policy to stage further attacks:

Having corrected a tendency of wanton beating and killing, our lenient policies in many places have deviated towards another mistake of lenience without bounds, lenience to an extent that has demoralized ourselves and emboldened the bandits and enemy agents... that has swollen the enemy’s arrogance and alienated the people.

Yang noted that while Mao did not initially respond to the calls for harsher punishment, his attitude changed following the outbreak of the Korean War. On 10 October 1950, Mao issued a new "Directive on suppression of counterrevolutionary activities", also known as the "Double-ten Directive", initiating a large scale suppression of counterrevolutionaries, and personally oversaw the operations. He wrote that the campaign's goal was to “wipe out all the bandits, special agents, local tyrants, and other counterrevolutionary elements that bring harm to the people.”

Yang noted that the time frame of the Korean War and the land reform campaign provided a short opportunity to initiate the campaign successfully, provided that it was implemented with care.

Mao's decision to initiate the campaign was highlighted in a conversation with Luo Ruiqing, then Minister of public security,

We must not miss this opportunity. Probably this is our only operation for suppressing counterrevolutionaries. This will not happen again in the future and therefore is a golden opportunity. Full advantage of this asset must be taken. The purpose is not just to kill several counterrevolutionaries. More importantly, this [campaign] is for mass mobilization.

Yang also noted Liu Shaoqi's explanation on why the war in Korea facilitated the suppression of counterrevolutionaries,

Once the gongs and drums of resisting the United States and assisting Korea begin to make a deafening sound, the gongs and drums of the land reform and suppression of counter-revolutionaries become barely audible, and the latter becomes much easier to implement. Without the loud gongs and drums of resisting the United States and assisting Korea, those of the land reform (and zhenfan) would make unbearable noise. Here a landlord is killed and there another is beaten; there would be fuss everywhere. Things would then become difficult.

Yang argued that the Campaign to Suppress Counterrevolutionaries was initiated in parallel with the Chinese entrance to the Korean War as a means of establishing its political authority amongst the Chinese populace via promoting patriotism and suppressing opposition elements.

The Double-ten Directive stressed on the "educational" effects of the campaign, and cases of execution were publicized by the newspapers to inform the masses. However, following the implementation of the campaign, Liu Shaoqi became concerned that the campaign could become too excessive. He stated, "If every execution is to appear on the newspapers, then there would be too much of the news on executions. I am afraid there would be side effects, like someone might begin to show suspicion on us being 'kill too many' or 'overreact'," arguing that the campaign should be moderated to avoid creating a negative image of the CCP.

Yang noted that initially, Mao agreed with Liu's suggestions, criticizing the "tactless" and "indiscriminate" purges in various provinces, which created an "excessively nervous atmosphere". Furthermore, Mao argued that "If our cadres do not have a clear idea about this and stick strictly to it, opportunities will be created for counterrevolutionaries, democratic personages will become discontent, and the people will not support us. Then our Party may fall into a difficult situation." As a result, many provinces ceased the executions in accordance.

== Further implementation ==
However, by January 1951, while the Chinese won major battles in the Korean War and public support at home began to rise, Mao became dissatisfied by the progress of the campaign. He argued that the power base of the former landlords and KMT officials had not been broken as a result of leniency, and that further executions are a necessary step. Mao stated, "If we are irresolute and tolerant to this evil, we will ... alienate the people", proposing that further executions should be carried out in areas with large concentrations of bandits, "As long as we do not kill the wrong people". On 21 January 1951, Mao sent a telegram to party members in Shanghai:

In a big city like Shanghai, probably it will take one to two thousand executions during this year to solve the problem. In the spring, three to five hundred executions will be needed to suppress the enemy’s arrogance and enhance the people’s morale. In Nanjing, the East China Bureau should direct the party’s municipality committee ... and strive to execute one to two hundred of the most important reactionaries in the spring.

A day later, 22 January 1951, Mao told the communists in Guangdong: "It is very good that you have already killed more than 3,700. Another three to four thousand should be killed ... the target for this year’s executions may be eight or nine thousand."

Yang noted that Mao implemented a quota for the executions in accordance with local populations. Mao argued that hardline counterrevolutionaries counted for less than 1 percent of the population in all regions, and that roughly 0.1 per cent of the population would have to be executed in order to get rid of the worst counterrevolutionary elements, while avoiding killing innocents. However, in reality, many provinces did not have enough counterrevolutionaries to meet the quota, and lacked the facilities to implement the mass arrests. As a result, many people were arrested recklessly based on assumptions, and many cases were decided without thorough examination.

On 21 February 1951, the "Regulations of the People’s Republic of China on punishment of counterrevolutionaries" was issued, which sets out the various "counterrevolutionary" crimes, including "collaborating with imperialism", "bribing government officials", "participating in armed rebellion", "participating in spying or espionage", and "looting and sabotage". Death penalties or life imprisonment were given based on the seriousness of the crime. Later, the charges of "local tyrants", and "historical counterrevolutionaries" who had incurred "blood debts" were added.

However, the charges were known for their vagueness and lack of concrete criteria, and many people were executed simply because of accusations or association with the former KMT government. The campaign's victims included not only former KMT officials but also landowners and landlords, critics of Mao's regime and urban businessmen and merchants.

In spite of this, by March 1951, many large cities implemented the campaign upon the urging of Mao. Mao argued that as long as the campaign targeted despised figures of society, the mass populace would be incited to support the campaign. Though he initially wanted to avoid inviting people outside the party, Mao's predictions were correct. Much of the trials of accused counterrevolutionaries had popular turnout, being heavily advertised on radio, and many of the invited civilians participated in the trials themselves. Jung Chang noted that in Beijing alone there were some 30,000 rallies attended by over 3 million people, and in one such rally, 200 people were paraded and executed with their blood splattering out on bystanders, and trucks carrying blood-stained corpses drove through the streets.

By late 1951, the Campaign to Suppress Counterrevolutionaries was briefly superseded by the Three-anti/five-anti campaigns, but continued until August 1952.

== Consequences ==
As the Chinese Communist Party's first major political campaign, the Campaign to Suppress Counterrevolutionaries was ultimately successful in eradicating bands of Kuomintang (KMT) underground forces. As a result, the various KMT sponsored assassination and sabotage campaigns across mainland China, which once posed a large threat to CCP authorities, were greatly reduced. Yang noted the suppression successfully destroyed KMT's hopes of retaking mainland China, as well as achieving the goal of mass mobilization by inciting popular support of party policies.

The campaign highlighted Mao's beliefs of class struggle through the revolutionary class. The ensuing repression and mass executions also paved the way for a subsequent series of campaigns against class enemies, such as the Anti-Rightist Movement and the Cultural Revolution that resulted in failure and more tragedies. In particular, it also led to the implementation of quotas in further CCP campaigns, which were assigned to local officials as a means of indicating the results of such campaigns. Yang argued that such measures later proved to be counterproductive and led to excesses.

Yang also noted the large number of wrongly convicted cases, which he attributed to the vagueness of the regulations, attempts by local officials to please superiors, lack of law enforcement in local government, personal grievances, and irrational crowds. In 1953, Xinhua News Agency investigated the claims, finding that in various provinces, many of the accused counterrevolutionaries were falsely labelled because of local disputes, and many local officials used the campaign to rid themselves of political rivals. Furthermore, a large number of former KMT personnel were targeted. Despite assurances by the CCP during the Chinese Civil War that surrendering KMT troops would be forgiven for their past associations, many of them were nevertheless targeted by local officials to meet quotas. Following the subsequent investigations, around 150,000 former KMT personnel across the country had their 'counterrevolutionary' label removed.

Mao admitted that mistakes had been made during the campaign and that innocent people had been killed. He stated that some people were "unjustly killed", but insisted that "basically there were no errors; that group of people should have been killed ... if they had not been killed the people would not have been able to raise their heads." Valentino argued that the biggest concern of the CCP during the campaigns was to urge local cadre to "not fear executing people only to fear mistakenly executing people" and to punish those who were too lenient and practiced "peaceful land reform".

=== Estimated number of deaths ===
Estimates for the number of deaths from 1949 to 1953 vary widely, with a total range of 200,000 to 5,000,000, which historian John King Fairbank called the upper end of "sober" estimates. It is difficult to separate killings due to land reform from killings due to the land reform movement (tugai), which occurred during the same years. As a result, most estimates below include deaths from both land reform and zhenfan:

- Roderick MacFarquhar estimates that 500,000–800,000 deaths occurred during zhenfan.
- In 1978, historian Benedict Stavis estimated that 200,000–800,000 were killed during land reform, part of an estimated 400,000–800,000 killed during land reform and zhenfan.
- In 1954, Xu Zirong, the Deputy Public Security Minister, published a report concluding that, during zhenfan, "712,000 counter-revolutionaries were executed, 1,290,000 were imprisoned, and 1,200,000 were subject to control at various times", for a total of 2,620,000 arrested. In 2008, historian Yang Kuisong argued that "the actual number of executions was much larger than the reported 712,000" because local officials concealed executions after Mao mildly criticized excessive killing in 1951. In 2012, historian Xuezhi Guo accepted the official estimate of 712,000 deaths.
- In 1957, Mao Zedong gave an influential speech to senior CPC officials in which he stated that 700,000 had been killed from 1950 and 1952, and another 70,000–80,000 from 1953 to 1956, for a total of 770,000–780,000. Some historians, such as Daniel Chirot, claim that Mao Zedong estimated that 2,000,0003,000,–000 had been killed. However, Mao's full quote includes both deaths and repressions: "two to three million counter-revolutionaries had been executed, imprisoned or placed under control in the past." because he was citing Xu's report.
- Some time before 1961, then-Premier Zhou Enlai told sympathetic journalist Edgar Snow that 830,000 "enemies of the people" had been "destroyed" before 1954, during land reform and zhenfan.
- In 1992, social scientist Steven W. Mosher estimated that "several million" died from land reform and zhenfan.
- In 1999, historian Maurice Meisner estimated that 2,000,000 people were executed in China from 1950 to 1952, including both land reform and zhenfen.
- In 2005, Li Changyu estimated that 2,000,000–3,000,000 were killed as a result of zhenfan.
- In 1952, the Free Trade Union Committee of the AFL-CIO, which was funded in whole or part by the CIA, released a report allegedly compiled by Wei Min of the "Democratic Revolutionary League", which claimed that 14,000,000–15,000,000 were killed during land reform and zhenfen. The report cited no sources.

Most of those killed were former Kuomintang officials, businessmen, former employees of Western companies, and intellectuals whose loyalty was suspect.

In addition, 1.5 million to 6 million people were sent to "reform through labour" camps, where many perished. Philip Short noted that such estimates exclude the hundreds of thousands driven to suicide during "struggle sessions" of the three-anti/five-anti campaigns, which also occurred around the same time.

The large number of deaths did not go unnoticed by local officials. Yang Kuisong noted that by May 1951, many provinces had called for a halt to the mass executions, but the killings had in fact increased due to acceptance of the suppression campaign as a means of settling local grievances. Mao also became concerned with the excessive executions, and suggested for the executions to be reduced to 0.05 percent, with a limit of 0.1 percent, while the rest of the accused criminals could be sentenced to life imprisonment or hard labor instead. Mao stated: "If we have such people executed, it will not be easily understood by the masses, nor will public figures be sympathetic; furthermore we would be deprived of a large pool of labor, and it would serve little use in dividing the enemy."

According to Jean-Louis Margolin, the harshness of the official prison system reached unprecedented levels, and the mortality rate until 1952 was "certainly in excess" of 5 percent per year, and reached 50 percent during six months in Guangxi. In Shanxi, more than 300 people died per day in one mine. Torture was commonplace and the suppression of revolts, which were quite numerous, resulted in "veritable massacres". One Chinese priest died after being interrogated for over 100 hours. Of the 20,000 inmates who worked in the oilfields of Yanchang, several thousand were executed.

By May 1951, the CCP Central Committee had issued a directive calling for a stop to the killings, giving the power of arrest and execution back to the central government. Furthermore, it clarified the procedures of dealing with accused counterrevolutionaries, as well as limiting the execution of death penalties to those with 'blood debts' or to have 'committed serious crimes'. Others who had received death penalties would have their sentences commuted by two years of manual labor, with their performance assessed as to determine whether the sentence would still be necessary. Despite the directive, while mass arrests and executions subsided in some regions, they still continued, albeit with much more secrecy.

=== Sufan movement ===
A further campaign of purges, known as the Sufan movement (肃反), was carried out in 1955 to 1957 to purge Party members, intellectuals, government bureaucrats, and military personnel who were claimed to be disloyal to the regime. During the movement, around 214,000 people were arrested and approximately 53,000 died.

== See also ==
- White Terror (Taiwan)
- Anti-Bolshevik League incident
- Futian incident
- List of massacres in China
- Mass killings of landlords under Mao Zedong
- Mass killings under communist regimes
- Propaganda in the People's Republic of China
- Sufan Movement
- Thought reform in the People's Republic of China
