= Struggle session =

Form of public humiliation and torture

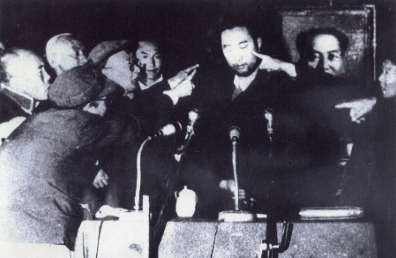
- 10th Panchen Lama of Tibet during a struggle session, 1964

Chinese name
- Simplified Chinese: 批斗大会
- Traditional Chinese: 批鬥大會
Transcriptions
Standard Mandarin
- Hanyu Pinyin: pīdòu dàhuì
- Wade–Giles: p'i^{1}-tou^{4} ta^{4}-hui^{4}
- IPA: [pʰítôʊ tâxwêɪ]

Tibetan name
- Tibetan: འཐབ་འཛིང
Transcriptions
- Wylie: 'thab-'dzing
- Lhasa IPA: tʰʌ́msiŋ

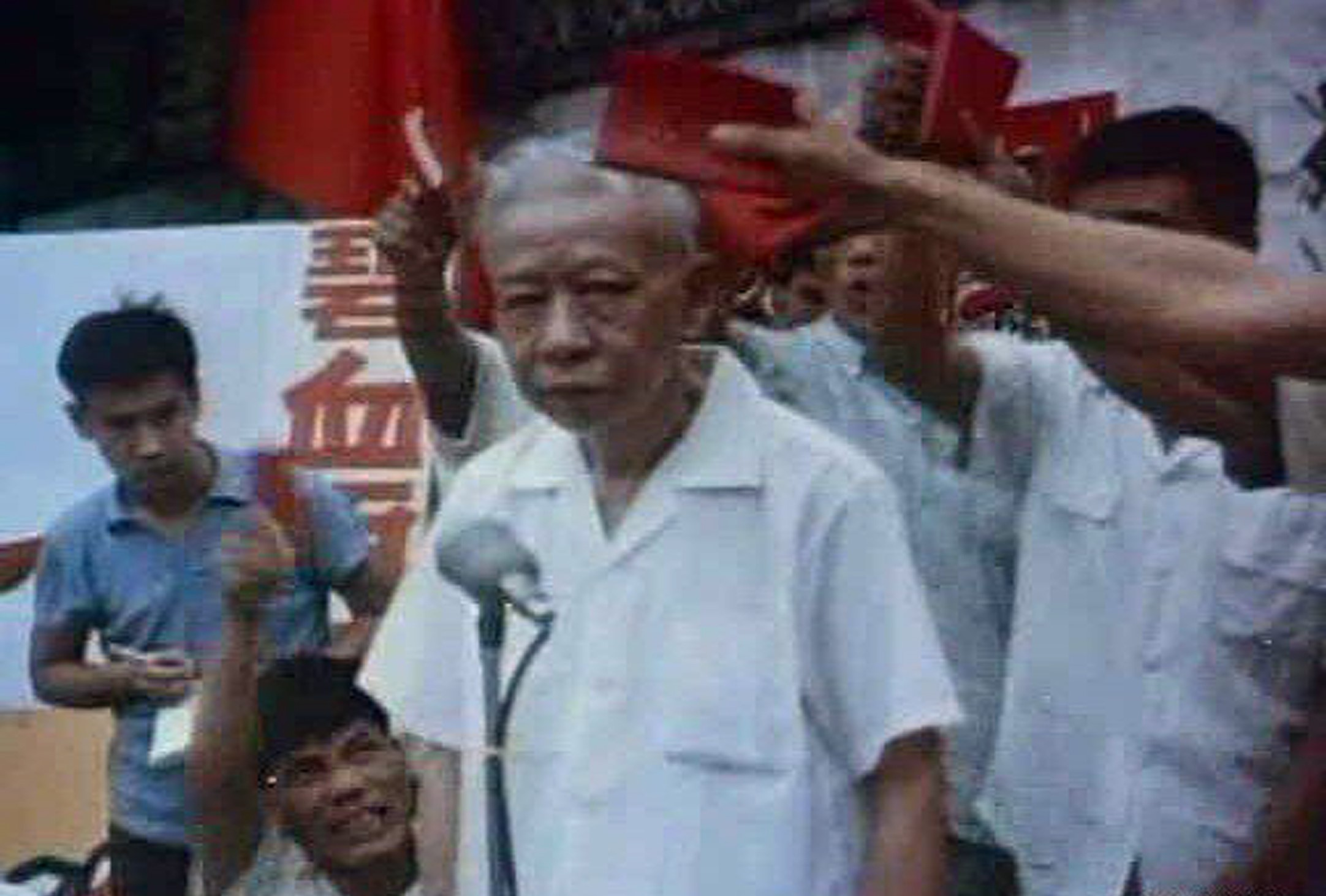
A struggle session of Liu Shaoqi, former president of China, who was persecuted to death during the Cultural Revolution. Red Guards were holding the "Little Red Book" containing quotations from Mao Zedong.

Struggle sessions (Chinese: 批斗大会; pinyin: pīdòu dàhuì), or denunciation rallies or struggle meetings, were public spectacles during the Cultural Revolution and in Maoist China, during which people accused of being "class enemies" were publicly humiliated, accused and criticized in public—sometimes to the point of violence and even death—often by people with whom they were close. The public rallies were most popular in the mass campaigns immediately before and after the establishment of the People's Republic of China, and peaked during the Cultural Revolution (1966–1976), when they were used to instill a crusading spirit among crowds to promote Maoist thought reform.

Struggle sessions were usually conducted at the workplace, classrooms and auditoriums, where "students were pitted against their teachers, friends and spouses were pressured to betray one another, [and] children were manipulated into exposing their parents", causing a breakdown in interpersonal relationships and social trust. Staging, scripts and agitators were prearranged by the Maoists to incite crowd support.

In particular, the denunciation of prominent "class enemies" was often conducted in public squares and marked by large crowds of people who surrounded the kneeling victim, raised their fists, and shouted accusations of misdeeds. They were forced to wear placards around their necks bearing the words "Counter-Revolutionary Revisionist" or other similar slogans with their names crossed out. Specific methods of abuse included hair shaving (阴阳头), dunce caps, "jetplane position" (喷气式) (a type of stress position), and verbal and physical attacks.

== Etymology ==
The term pīdòu (批鬥) comes from pīpàn (批判, 'to criticize and judge') and dòuzhēng (鬥爭, 'to fight and contest'), therefore the whole expression conveys the message of "inciting the spirit of judgment and fighting", and instead of saying the full phrase pīpàn dòuzhēng, one often speaks of the shortened version pīdòu (批鬥).

The term "struggle session" refers to a session of pīdòu (批鬥): the session is held in public and often attended by a large crowd of people, during which the target is publicly humiliated and subject to verbal and physical abuse, for having "counter-revolutionary" thinking or behavior.

== History ==
=== Origins and development ===
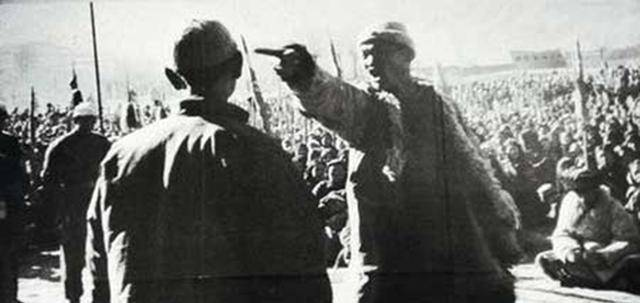
A struggle session of a landlord, during the Land Reform Movement, 1946

Struggle sessions developed from similar ideas of criticism and self-criticism in the Soviet Union from the 1920s. Chinese communists initially resisted this practice, as struggle sessions conflicted with the Chinese concept of "saving face"; however, these sessions became commonplace at Chinese Communist Party (CCP) meetings during the 1930s due to public popularity.

Struggle sessions emerged in China as a tactic to secure the allegiance of the Chinese people during the Land Reform Movement (which ended in 1953). As early as the 1940s, in areas controlled by the CCP during the Chinese Civil War, the CCP encouraged peasants to "criticize" and "struggle against" land owners in order to shape class consciousness. This campaign sought to mobilize the masses through "speak bitterness" sessions (訴苦, sùkǔ, 'give utterance to grievances') in which peasants accused land owners.

The strongest accusations in the "speak bitterness" sessions would be incorporated into public mass accusation meetings (控訴大會, kòngsù dàhuì). Cadre induced peasants to actively participate in struggle sessions, which sometimes resulted in peasants committing violent acts against landlords. It also cemented peasant regard for the CCP. Violence during the Land Reform Movement resulted in the mass killing of landlords. Later struggle sessions were adapted to use outside the CCP as a means of consolidating control of areas under its jurisdiction.

Struggle sessions were further employed during the Anti-Rightist Campaign launched by Mao Zedong in 1957, during which a large number of people, both inside and outside the CCP, were labeled "rightists" and subjected to persecution and public "criticism". Many alleged "rightists" were repeatedly "struggled against" and purged. According to official CCP statistics released during the "Boluan Fanzheng" period after Mao's death, the campaign resulted in the political persecution of at least 550,000 people.

=== Cultural Revolution ===
After the disasters of the Great Leap Forward, Mao Zedong had stepped back from presiding over the daily affairs of China's Central Committee. In order to regain power and defeat political enemies within the party, Mao leveraged his cult of personality to unleash the Cultural Revolution in 1966.

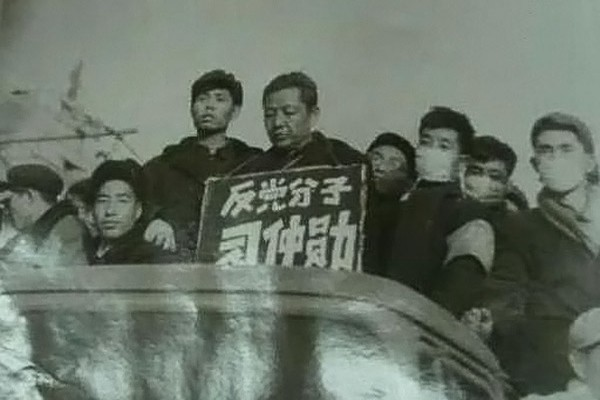
A struggle session of Xi Zhongxun, the father of Xi Jinping, at Northwest A&F University during the Cultural Revolution, September 1967. The banner reads "Anti-Party element Xi Zhongxun".

During the Cultural Revolution (1966–1976), struggle sessions were widely conducted by Red Guards and various rebel groups across mainland China. Though there was no specific definition for the "targets of struggle", they included the Five Black Categories and anyone else who could be deemed an enemy of Mao Zedong Thought. According to one source on classified official statistics, nearly 2 million Chinese were killed, and another 125 million were either persecuted or "struggled against" (subject to struggle sessions) during the Cultural Revolution.

In the early phase of the revolution, mass violence spread over school campuses, where teachers and professors were subjected to frequent struggle sessions, abused, humiliated, and beaten by their students. Intellectuals were labelled as counter-revolutionaries ("反动学术权威") and were even called "Stinking Old Ninth", subject to frequent struggle sessions and extensive torture. During the Red August of Beijing in 1966, notable intellectuals such as Lao She and Chen Mengjia committed suicide after being humiliated and "struggled against".

Meanwhile, Zhou Zuoren requested euthanasia from the local police after being harassed by Red Guards, but received no reply. Zhou eventually died of a sudden relapse of an illness on May 6, 1967.

Top government officials, including Liu Shaoqi, Deng Xiaoping, Peng Dehuai, and Tao Zhu, were also widely "struggled against" and even persecuted to death during the revolution. Fallen party leaders were denounced in stadiums or in gymnasiums or paraded on open trucks and driven through the streets of Beijing. The Minister of Coal Industry, Zhang Linzhi, was forced to wear a 60kg iron hat and later beaten to death. Crowds even gathered outside the highly-protected residence of Zhongnanhai to demand leaders who were denounced to be dragged out for public humiliation.

After the Cultural Revolution, struggle sessions were disowned in China in favor of more formal legal proceedings, starting from the Boluan Fanzheng period, when the reformers, led by Deng Xiaoping, took power in December 1978. Deng and other senior officials prohibited struggle sessions and other forms of Mao-era violent political campaigns, and the primary focus of Chinese Communist Party and the Chinese government shifted from "class struggle" to "economic construction".

== Academic studies ==
=== Purposes ===
Frederick T. C. Yu identified three categories of mass campaigns employed by the CCP in the years before and after the establishment of the People's Republic of China (PRC):

- Economic campaigns sought to improve conditions, often by increasing production in particular sectors of the economy.
- Ideological campaigns sought to change people's thinking and behaviour.
- Struggle sessions were similar to ideological campaigns, but "their focus is on the elimination of the power base and/or class position of enemy classes or groups."

The process of struggle sessions served multiple purposes. First, it demonstrated to the masses that the party was determined to subdue any opposition (generally labeled "class enemies") by violence if necessary. Second, potential rivals were crushed. Third, those who attacked the targeted foes became complicit in the violence and hence invested in the state. All three served to consolidate the party's control, which was deemed necessary because party members constituted a small minority of China's population.

Both accusation meetings and mass trials were largely propaganda tools to accomplish the party's aims. Klaus Mühlhahn, professor of China studies at Freie Universität Berlin, wrote:

Carefully arranged and organized, the mass trials and accusatory meetings followed clear and meticulously prearranged patterns. Dramatic devices such as staging, props, working scripts, agitators, and climactic moments were used to efficiently engage the emotions of the audience—to stir up resentment against the targeted groups and mobilize the audience to support the regime.

Julia C. Strauss observed that public tribunals were "but the visible dénouement of a show that had been many weeks in preparation".

=== Accounts ===
Anne F. Thurston, in Enemies of the People, gave a description of a struggle session for the professor You Xiaoli: "I had many feelings at that struggle session. I thought there were some bad people in the audience. But I also thought there were many ignorant people, people who did not understand what was happening, so I pitied that kind of person. They brought workers and peasants into the meetings, and they could not understand what was happening. But I was also angry."

== Depictions in media ==
The struggle session has become one of the most emblematic and recognizable visuals from the Cultural Revolution, often depicted in film and TV to immediately place viewers in the era. Belinda Qian He, professor of East Asian and Cinema & Media studies at the University of Maryland, even describes these "show trials" as "the period's iconic form of violence".

Pidouhui [struggle session] stands out as one of the most spectacular icons of China's socialist class struggle, with a few highly visible formal elements: gesticulating and slogan-shouting masses, the objects of the struggle with their heads hung or kneel down (sometimes also wear the "dunce caps" or hold their arms in a humiliating and painful position called the "jet plane style"), big placard with a denunciatory label written on it and with the person's name crossed out, among others.

Notable examples of struggle sessions shown in Chinese cinema can be found in The Last Emperor, Farewell My Concubine (1993) and To Live (1994). These historical films achieved immense international acclaim, and some were censored in mainland China for their critical depictions of the Cultural Revolution.

=== 3 Body Problem ===
In 2024, Netflix's global adaptation of the award-winning Chinese science fiction novel The Three-Body Problem by Liu Cixin sparked significant controversy in China by opening with a scene from the Cultural Revolution. In the first episode, Ye Wenjie, one of the main characters, watches in horror as her father, a physics professor at the prestigious Tsinghua University, is publicly beaten to death in a struggle session.

The scene may have been inspired by the true story of Ye Qisun, who was a renowned Chinese physicist persecuted during the Cultural Revolution, and who shares the same family name as the fictional character. The real Ye even founded the Department of Physics at Tsinghua University.

Though the series' opening was criticized on Chinese social media for casting China in a negative light, the portrayal of the struggle session was done with original author Liu Cixin's blessing. In an interview with The Chosun Daily, a Korean newspaper, Liu stated that he "provided personal opinions as an advisor" to the Netflix production, and while not all of his suggestions were taken, "the depiction of the [Cultural Revolution] did not deviate from [his] original work." Liu had originally intended to open the novel the same way, but moved the scenes to the middle of the narrative on the advice of his Chinese publisher to avoid government censorship.

When asked why he emphasized the Cultural Revolution in his book, Liu stated:

"It was necessary to mention the event to develop the story. The plot required a scenario where a modern Chinese person becomes completely disillusioned with humanity, and no other event in modern Chinese history seemed appropriate except the Cultural Revolution."

== See also ==
- Anti-Bolshevik League incident, 1930s purge
- Campaign to Suppress Counterrevolutionaries, early 1950s purge
- Futian incident, 1930 purge
- Acts of repudiation, Cuba
- Self-criticism (Marxism–Leninism)
- Show trial
- Two Minutes Hate, in Orwell's novel, Nineteen Eighty-Four
- Kangaroo court
- Presumption of guilt
- Consciousness raising, activism popularized by Second-wave feminism in the late 1960s, partly inspired by Struggle session.
