= Anti-Bolshevik League =

Anti-Bolshevik League may refer to:

- Anti-Bolshevik League (China)
- Sekka Boshidan, a Japanese organization, sometimes translated as "Anti-Bolshevik League" or "Anti-Red League"
- Anti-Bolshevik League (Italy)
- Anti-Bolshevist League (Germany)
