= Gao Hua =

Chinese historian (1954–2011)

- 高华
- Born: May 12, 1954; Nanjing, Jiangsu, China
- Died: December 26, 2011 (aged 57); Nanjing, Jiangsu, China
- Resting place: Pujue Temple Cemetery, Nanjing
- Education: Nanjing University (BA, MA, PhD)
- Occupation: Historian
- Employer(s): Nanjing University; East China Normal University
- Notable work: How the Red Sun Rose (2000)
- Awards: Joseph Levenson Book Prize honorable mention (2020, posthumous)

Gao Hua (Chinese: 高华; pinyin: Gāo Huá; May 12, 1954 – December 26, 2011) was a Chinese historian and a professor in the Department of History at Nanjing University, where he also served as a doctoral supervisor. He later held a concurrent appointment as chair professor and doctoral supervisor at East China Normal University in Shanghai. He was best known for his research on the history of the Chinese Communist Party (CCP), and in particular for How the Red Sun Rose, his study of the Yan'an Rectification Movement.

== Early life and education ==
Gao Hua was born in 1954 in Nanjing, Jiangsu Province. By his own account in At the Fengling Ferry Crossing of History, neither of his parents was an intellectual. His father, Gao Qifa, grew up in poverty and began working as a child laborer in an electroplating factory. With financial help from an uncle he completed junior middle school, and he later joined the CCP underground. In 1949 he served as an acting section chief on the Nanjing Military Control Commission.

After 1949, shifts in the political climate brought a series of purges against former members of the party's underground organization in Nanjing, and in 1954 Gao Qifa was expelled from the CCP. In 1958 he was labeled a rightist, and the family was subjected to discrimination under the political conditions of the period. During the Cultural Revolution Gao Qifa was subjected to struggle sessions, while Gao Hua spent some eight years working as a laborer and continued to educate himself by reading history.

Once the national college entrance examination was restored after the Cultural Revolution and candidates were no longer screened by class background, Gao was admitted in 1978 to the History Department of Nanjing University, where he studied under Mao Jiaqi. After graduating he was assigned to the Nanjing Cultural Relics Administration, but he soon returned to Nanjing University for graduate study, taking a master's degree and then a doctorate in history.

== Academic career ==
Gao remained at Nanjing University to teach after completing his doctorate. His research centered on modern Chinese history, the history of the Republican period, the history of the Chinese left-wing cultural movement, and the history of the People's Republic of China. From 1995 to 1996 he was a visiting scholar at the School of Advanced International Studies of Johns Hopkins University in the United States. He was subsequently promoted to full professor and doctoral supervisor at Nanjing University. He was a visiting professor in the history department of National Chengchi University in Taiwan from February to July 2004, and in the history department of the Chinese University of Hong Kong from January to June 2006.

In 2005, at the invitation of the historian Yang Kuisong of East China Normal University, Gao decided to leave Nanjing, where he had lived for twenty-five years, and move to Shanghai as a professor and doctoral supervisor. The transfer ultimately could not be completed for what were described as reasons beyond his control, and East China Normal University was able to appoint him only as a chair professor and doctoral supervisor on a concurrent basis. His student Huang Jun recalled that Gao seemed dispirited on returning to Nanjing.

== How the Red Sun Rose ==
Gao's best-known book, How the Red Sun Rose: The Origin and Development of the Yan'an Rectification Movement, 1930–1945, was published in Hong Kong by the Chinese University Press in 2000 after some two decades of research. Drawing on party documents, memoirs, diaries and local materials, it reconstructs the Yan'an Rectification Movement and treats it as the process through which Mao Zedong consolidated his personal authority within the CCP and established the ideological and organizational practices that shaped the party thereafter.

In the afterword to the 2000 edition, Gao wrote that he hoped the ultra-leftist habit of judging others by one's own political line, and the politics of manipulation that accompanied it, would never return, and that the country would move onto a path of democracy and the rule of law.

The book was never approved for publication in mainland China, though it circulated widely and drew praise from scholars including Yang Chen-Ning, Wang Yuanhua, Chen Fong-ching and Wu Jinglian. An English translation by Stacy Mosher and Guo Jian was published by the Chinese University Press in 2018.

== Illness and death ==
Gao was found to have liver cancer in 2007; he described that year as an especially difficult one and underwent repeated health crises in the years that followed, while continuing to research, to teach, and to supervise ten master's students and four doctoral students.

He died at 10:15 p.m. on December 26, 2011, at Jiangsu Province Hospital in Nanjing, at the age of 57. A memorial service was held on December 30 at the Shizigang funeral home in Nanjing, and he was buried in the Pujue Temple Cemetery.

== Selected works ==
- 紅太陽是怎樣升起的——延安整風運動的來龍去脈 [How the Red Sun Rose: The Origin and Development of the Yan'an Rectification Movement]. Hong Kong: Chinese University Press, 2000.
- 身份和差異：1949–1965年中國社會的政治分層 [Identity and Difference: Political Stratification in Chinese Society, 1949–1965]. Hong Kong: Chinese University Press, 2004.
- 在歷史的風陵渡口 [At the Fengling Ferry Crossing of History]. Hong Kong: Times International, 2008.
- 革命年代 [Years of Revolution]. Guangzhou: Guangdong People's Publishing House, 2010.
- 多變的孫科 [The Changeable Sun Ke]. Hong Kong: China Publishing House, 2012.
- 高華歷史筆記 [Gao Hua's Historical Notes]. Guangzhou: Guangdong People's Publishing House, 2012.
- 歷史筆記 [Historical Notes]. 2 vols. Hong Kong: Oxford University Press (China), 2014.
- 歷史學的境界 [The Horizons of History]. Guilin: Guangxi Normal University Press, 2015.

== Awards ==
- In February 2020, the English translation of How the Red Sun Rose received an honorable mention for the Association for Asian Studies' Joseph Levenson Book Prize.
