= Peaceful coexistence =

Cold War policy of peaceful relations between Communist and Capitalist nations

Peaceful coexistence (Russian: мирное сосуществование, romanized: mirnoye sosushchestvovaniye) was a theory, developed and applied by the Soviet Union at various points during the Cold War in the context of primarily Marxist–Leninist foreign policy and adopted by Soviet-dependent socialist states, according to which the Socialist Bloc could peacefully coexist with the capitalist bloc (i.e., U.S.-allied states). This was in contrast to the antagonistic contradiction principle that socialism and capitalism could never coexist in peace. The Soviet Union applied it to relations between the western world, particularly NATO countries, and nations of the Warsaw Pact.

Debates over differing interpretations of peaceful coexistence were one aspect of the Sino-Soviet split in the 1950s and 1960s. During the 1970s, the People's Republic of China under the leadership of its founder, Mao Zedong, argued that a belligerent attitude should be maintained towards capitalist countries, and so initially rejected the peaceful coexistence theory as essentially Marxist revisionism. Their decision in 1972 to establish a trade relationship with the United States also saw China cautiously adopting a version of the theory to relations between itself and non-socialist countries. From that point through the early 1980s and the adoption of Socialism with Chinese characteristics, China increasingly extended its own peaceful coexistence concept to include all nations. Albanian ruler Enver Hoxha (at one time, China's only true ally) also denounced this and turned against China as a result of the latter's growing ties to the West, as exemplified by Richard Nixon's visit to China in 1972; today, Hoxhaist parties continue to denounce the concept of peaceful coexistence.

Peaceful coexistence, in extending itself to all countries and social movements tied to the USSR's interpretation of communism, quickly became modus operandi for many individual communist parties as well, encouraging quite a few, especially those in the developed world, to give up their long-term goal of amassing support for an armed, insurrectionist communist revolution in exchange for more active participation in electoral politics.

== Soviet policy ==
Khrushchev solidified the concept in Soviet foreign policy in 1956 at the 20th Congress of the Communist Party of the Soviet Union. The policy arose as an attempt to reduce hostility between the two superpowers, particularly in light of the possibility of nuclear war. The Soviet theory of peaceful coexistence asserted that the United States and USSR, and their respective political ideologies, could coexist rather than fighting one another, and Khrushchev tried to demonstrate his commitment to peaceful coexistence by attending international peace conferences, such as the Geneva Summit, and by traveling internationally, such as his 13-day trip to tour the United States in 1959. The World Peace Council founded in 1949 and largely funded by the Soviet Union attempted to organize a peace movement in favor of the concept internationally.

Peaceful coexistence was meant to assuage Western, capitalist concerns that the socialist Soviet Union was driven by the concept of world revolution advocated by its founders, Vladimir Lenin and the Bolsheviks. Lenin and the Bolsheviks advocated world revolution through workers' "internal revolutions" within their own nations, but they had never advocated its spread by international warfare, such as invasion by Red Army troops from a neighboring socialist nation into a capitalist one.

Indeed, short of such "internal revolutions" by workers themselves, Lenin had talked about "peaceful cohabitation" with capitalist countries. Khrushchev used this aspect of Lenin's politics to argue that while socialism would eventually triumph over capitalism, this would be done not by force but by example. Implicitly, this proclamation meant the end of the USSR's advocacy of the spread of communist revolution through insurrectionist violence, which some communists around the world saw as a betrayal of the principles of revolutionary communism itself.

In addition to being a reaction to the realization that a nuclear war between the two superpowers would ensure the destruction of not only the socialist system but the entirety of humanity, it also reflected the USSR's strategic military disposition - the move away from large, and possibly politically offensive, military ventures towards a force centered on proxy wars and a strategic nuclear missile force. Although disquiet over this shift helped bring Khrushchev down, his successors did not return to the antagonistic contradiction theories of an inevitable conflict between the capitalist and socialist systems. Initially, this was China's main gripe with the theory, and the reason the latter from then on classified the Soviet Union as a "betrayer of the Revolution."

=== Cuban policy ===
As Marxists we have maintained that peaceful coexistence among nations does not encompass coexistence between the exploiters and the exploited, between the oppressors and the oppressed.

— Che Guevara, December 11, 1964 speech to the United Nations

One of the most outspoken critics of peaceful coexistence during the early 1960s was Argentine Marxist revolutionary Che Guevara. As a leader in the Cuban government during the October Missile Crisis, Guevara believed that a repeat invasion by the United States (after the Bay of Pigs) would be justifiable grounds for a nuclear war. In Guevara's view, the capitalist bloc was composed of "hyenas and jackals" that "fed on unarmed peoples".

== Chinese policy ==
Premier Zhou Enlai of the People's Republic of China proposed the Five Principles of Peaceful Coexistence in 1954 during negotiations with India over Tibet and these were written into the Agreement Between the People's Republic of China and the Republic of India on Trade and Intercourse Between the Tibet Region of China and India signed in 1954 by Zhou and Prime Minister of India Jawaharlal Nehru. The principles were reiterated by Zhou at the Bandung Conference of Asian and African countries where they were incorporated into the conference declarations. One major consequence of this policy was that the PRC would not support Communist insurgencies in Southeast Asia, particularly in Thailand and Malaysia, and would distance itself from overseas Chinese in those nations.

Mao Zedong pursued close relations with 'capitalist' countries like Pakistan, Ethiopia, Tanzania, Iran and Zambia. China did not endorse or support the Communist rebellion in the Philippines and hosted Philippine president Ferdinand Marcos in 1975. In 1972, the U.S. president Richard Nixon visited China. China extended credit to Augusto Pinochet's Chile. The pro-Western dictator of Zaire, Mobutu Sese Seko visited Beijing in 1973, and signed economic and technical cooperation agreements.

To justify China's close relations with U.S. allies, the Three Worlds Theory was adopted. Both U.S. and U.S.S.R were seen as imperialist powers.

With Mao's death the Chinese softened their line, though would never endorse the views of their rivals. During the late 1970s and 1980s, the concept of peaceful coexistence was expanded as a framework for all sovereign nations. In 1982 the Five Principles were written into the Constitution of the People's Republic of China which claims to be bound by them in its international relations.

The Five Principles of Peaceful Coexistence as promoted by China are:

- mutual respect for sovereignty and territorial integrity
- mutual non-aggression
- non-interference in each other's internal affairs
- equality and mutual benefit
- peaceful co-existence

There are three notable consequences of the Chinese concept of peaceful coexistence. First of all, in contrast with the Soviet concepts of the mid-1970s, the Chinese concepts include the encouragement of global free trade. Second, the Chinese concept of peaceful coexistence places a large emphasis on national sovereignty and territorial integrity, and thus moves by the United States to promote its interests are seen in this framework as hostile. Finally, as the PRC does not consider Taiwan to be sovereign, the concept of peaceful coexistence does not extend to Taiwan, and efforts by other nations, particularly the United States, to involve itself in PRC-Taiwan relations are seen as hostile actions in this framework.

== Use in modern diplomacy ==
More recently, the phrase has gained currency beyond its usage in communist phraseology and has been adopted by the broader diplomatic world. For instance, in his 2004 Christmas address, Pope John Paul II called for "peaceful coexistence" in the Middle East.

== See also ==
- Détente
- Five Principles of Peaceful Coexistence
- International relations theory
- Mutual assured destruction
- Neutral and Non-Aligned European States
- Peaceful evolution
- Socialism in one country
