= Hu Ping =

Hu Ping may refer to:

- Hu Ping (writer)
- Hu Ping (politician)
- Hu Ping (actress)
