= Li Lisan line =

1930 event of the Chinese Civil War

The Li Lisan line was the 1930 military campaign by the Chinese Communist Party (CCP, or the Communists) to achieve strategic victory in the Chinese Civil War against the Kuomintang-led (KMT) Republic of China (ROC) by seizing urban areas. It was developed by Li Lisan, the party leader. The offensive quickly failed. The Chinese Red Army was stopped as it advanced northward to Wuhan and retreated back to its southern rural base areas. Support among urban workers - which the party had overestimated - did not materialize. The Red Army stopped attacking to prepare for the ROC's first encirclement campaign against the Jiangxi Soviet.

The failure of the Li Lisan line shifted the CCP's strategy from urban- to rural-based revolution. The change, accompanied by leadership changes, allowed Mao Zedong - an advocate of rural-based revolution - to emerge with greater influence within the party.

== Background ==
=== Communist strategy for revolution ===
In 1927, the First United Front collapsed and fighting broke out between the KMT and the CCP. The Communists initially used defectors and Communist-controlled units from the KMT-dominated National Revolutionary Army and worker militias for its armed forces but these were insufficient. The Communists suffered heavy losses from KMT purges and suppressed uprisings, particularly in urban areas where the Communists were ideologically based. By August, the CCP was reorganizing as a clandestine movement to survive. The Communists found greater success in rural areas. Urban workers, who were more interested in the economic matters, were less receptive to Communist calls for political change. By 1928, 75% of party members were peasants. Also, through the late-1920s the Chinese Red Army continued to fight the ROC away from the cities and, in some places, established Communist-controlled enclaves.

The Communists received strategic advice from the Soviet Union (USSR) through the Communist International (Comintern). In early-1929, the Comintern issued guidance to refocus the movement on the proletariat and urban insurrection. During the 1929 Sino-Soviet conflict over the Chinese Eastern Railway, the USSR sought to complement Soviet military action against the ROC with Communist attacks. In October, the Comintern instructed the Communists to intensify their guerrilla warfare by vaguely implying that there was a "rising revolutionary tide" and that conditions were becoming favorable for revolution. This was markedly different from previous cautious Comintern assessments. The instructions reached the party's central leadership in Shanghai in early December as the conflict ended. Li Lisan had practically been party leader since 1928 and supported urban insurrection. In early 1929, he had been pessimistic about the prospects of a national revolution due to weak support for the Communists in the cities. The Comintern assessment from October revived his confidence. The party center believed that workers' revolutionary fervor could be translated into urban insurrections by attacking cities with the rural armies; capturing major cities would then catalyze a national revolution.

Mao Zedong and Zhu De had misgivings about the new strategy, and participated either cautiously or reluctant. Mao had also assessed that revolutionary prospects were increasing based on his work in rural base areas and acknowledged - at least in word - of the need for "proletarian leadership" and capturing cities. Mao differed from Li in using protracted encirclements of cities as preludes to their capture, instead of immediate direct assaults; encirclement complemented Mao's strategy of first achieving rural control. A party conference in February 1930 supported the urban insurrection over Mao's encirclement strategy.

=== Preparations ===
On 8 December 1929, the CCP Central Committee ordered the rural armies to expand by absorbing irregular units and concentrate. Specific planning began in early-1930. The first major target would be Wuhan, preceded by attacks on Changsha, Nanchang and Jiujiang. The Communists believed the capture of Wuhan would generate momentum to capture Shanghai, and from there "set off a worldwide chain of revolutionary events."

There was friction between Li in Shanghai, and Mao and Zhu in Jiangxi. The Jiangxi Soviet received the Central Committee's orders arrived in late-January. Mao and Zhu's slow and incomplete compliance drew criticism from the party center; Mao cancelled attacks on Ji'an and Ganzhou in March and then spent three months consolidating the rural base area. Mao and Zhu refused Li's orders to meet in Shanghai.

Mao and Zhu's summons by Li was part of a larger effort to concentrate control of the army in the party center and away from local commanders. In February 1930, the Red Army was reorganized to allow a clear chain-of-command from the party center through the General Front Committee. The General Front Committee was created by the Central Committee in April 1930 to exercise in theater control. In practice, the center's influence over the army remained limited as Mao was made chair of the front committee. Emergency provincial-level Action Committees were created which reported to the Li. The armies were subordinated to the army's new Central Revolutionary Military Commission which also answered to Li. Mao and Zhu were offered positions on the Military Commission when they were ordered to attack in June. Before the offensive the Red Army took an oath of allegiance to the party, the "Li Lisan oath".

Communist preparations alarmed the USSR. On 23 July, a Comintern letter drafted in May arrived in Shanghai stating that the revolutionary movement was still too weak to overthrow the ROC. Another letter received on 28 July repeated Soviet opposition to urban uprising. The offensive proceeded anyway.

== Campaign ==
=== Changsha and Nanchang ===
The offensive began on 25 July with Peng Dehuai's Third Red Corps, formerly the Fifth Red Army, attacking Changsha. The corps defeated a KMT force, led by He Jian, four times its size and captured the city on 27 or 29 July. No worker revolt ensued. Foreign gunboats sailed up the Xiang River and conducted bombardments to protect foreign concessions. The Communists abandoned the city on 3 August with captured supplies. The KMT's National Revolutionary Army (NRA) reoccupied the city and began purging Communist sympathizers.

Mao and Zhu's First Red Corps, formerly the Fourth Red Army, was ordered to attack Nanchang on 22 July. It moved slowly. The corps left Tingzhou on 27 or 28 July. It travelled less than 100 miles westward in the next ten days, and another 70 miles northwards over the next two weeks to Zhangzhu, where there was fighting. Nanchang was judged to be too heavily defended. The Communists made a symbolic attack on the city on 1 August and withdrew.

The corps combined at Liuyang, Hunan, into the First Front Army with Mao and Zhu in command. The First Front Army decided to attack Changsha again; Mao and Zhu were against this. NRA reinforcements were arriving and were supported by foreign gunboats. The second attack started on 1 September and was stopped by strong defenses a few miles south-east of Changsha; the Communists retreated on 12 or 13 September after heavy fighting and the approach of further NRA reinforcements.

=== Ji'an ===
The First Front Army withdrew to Jiangxi. A minority demanded another attack on the better defended Nanchang. They were placated by attacking Ji'an, supposedly as a preclude to Nanchang; capturing the city would consolidate the southwestern territory of the Jiangxi Soviet. The army spend three weeks resting and rearming. The First Front Army, local Communist militia, and Communist Youth advanced on Ji'an from three directions on the morning of 4 October and captured it by nightfall; the defenders "slipped away without a fight".

== Aftermath ==
=== Cancelling the offensive ===
The offensive ended with the Communists failing to achieve any its objectives and ended as strategic circumstances shifted. Even as the offensive began, Li's ability to support it began to erode. By late-July, the Soviets had set up a radio transmitter in Shanghai, eliminating much of the communications delay and Li's freedom of action. By late-August, Li could no longer ignore Soviet opposition to the urban uprising plan and he cancelled the attacks on Wuhan and Shanghai. By that time, Li's power of unilateral action was further reduced by the return of Zhou Enlai and Qu Qiubai to the party center. In mid-November, the party center received a Comintern letter accusing Li of ideological deviation and executing the offensive against Comintern directives. Li was practically removed from the party leadership in December when he was recalled to Moscow.

The offensive also halted to prepare for the NRA's first encirclement campaign against the Jiangxi Soviet. The Communists learned of the NRA offensive from documents captured in Ji'an.

=== Communist politics ===
Li's removal was followed by a reorganization of the party leadership by Pavel Mif, Stalin's China specialist. Over the next few years, the 28 Bolsheviks became the dominant group in the party leadership. Zhou successfully distanced himself from Li and helped alter party strategy to match Mao's, enhancing the latter's influence. In Jiangxi, Mao's position was buttressed by support from the center, who saw him as a balancing force against Li's old and now distrusted associates.

In November 1930, Mao used accusations of ties to the KMT's Anti-Bolshevik Corps (AB Corps) to purge the Jiangxi Action Committee and the First Front Army to secure leadership over the Red Army and consolidate power. Mao's subsequent AB Corps purges, culminating in the Futian incident in July 1931, were overlooked by the party center which was preoccupied with the post-Li leadership changes and the First Extermination Campaign.

=== Evolution of the Red Army ===
The Red Army emerged from the campaign as a more tightly integrated force. Before the campaign, the army had included many small, scattered and operationally independent units; the need to concentrate to assault cities brought many of these units under a single headquarters. The reorganization needed to create the First Front Army included standardizing unit baselines for training, equipment and personnel; the First Front Army was another step in giving the Red Army a professional military structure.

The campaign helped shift the Red Army's tactics from guerrilla warfare to mobile warfare.
