= Chinese Marxist philosophy =

Philosophy of dialectical materialism in the Chinese academia

Chinese Marxist philosophy is the philosophy of dialectical materialism that was introduced into China in the early 1900s and continues in Chinese academia to the current day.

Marxist philosophy was initially imported into China between 1900 and 1930, in translations from German, Russian, and Japanese. The Chinese translator of Darwin's The Origin of Species, Ma Junwu, was also the first one who introduced Marxism into China. For Ma, evolutionism and Marxism are the secrets of social development. This was before the formal dialectical materialism of the Chinese Communist Party (CCP), in which many independent radical intellectuals embraced Marxism. Many of them later joined the CCP.

Chinese Dialectical Materialism began to be formalized during the 1930s, under the influence of Mitin's New Philosophy. In the late 1930s, Mao Zedong would begin to develop his own sinified version of Dialectical Materialism that was independent of the Soviet Philosophy. Maoist Dialectics remained the dominant paradigm into the 1970s, and most debates were on technical questions of dialectical ontology. In the 1980s the Dengist reforms led to a large-scale translation and influence of works of Western Marxism and Marxist Humanism.

== Interaction with European Marxism ==
Li Da (1890–1966) translated many of the early works of German social democracy and Soviet Marxism into Chinese. He Sinified the New Philosophy of Mark Borisovich Mitin in his Elements of Sociology. Ai Siqi translated many of Mitin's works and helped introduce the New Philosophy to China. Early Chinese Marxism borrowed heavily from Soviet textbooks. Following Mitin, Ai Siqi attacked the idea of equality of contradictions between two unequal things.

The Chinese Philosophers strongly took the side of Mitin against Abram Deborin. They were particularly influenced by his unity of theory and praxis. Mao Zedong was influenced by these works in authoring his Lectures on Dialectical Materialism.

Consistent with the Soviet perspective, the Chinese Communist Party (CCP) emphasized the value of physical labor as a central factor in developing people into new socialist citizens.

Mao Zedong was critical of the dialectical materialism of Stalin. Mao criticized Stalin for not recognizing that opposites are interconnected and believed that because of this Stalin's dialectics had metaphysical errors.

== Mao Zedong's thought ==
In the late 1930s, a series of debates were held on the extent to which Dialectical Logic was a supplement to, or replacement for, Formal Logic. A major controversy that continued into the 1960s, was whether a dialectical contradiction was the same thing as a logical contradiction.

Mao later moved away from replicating the New Philosophy, and attempted to develop his own form of Marxism that heavily emphasized the centrality of On Contradiction and On Practice. Mao saw the struggle between opposites as the key to dialectics, and this played a major role in the One Divides Into Two controversy of the 1960s. In Mao's 1964 Talk on Questions of Philosophy, he rejected any possibility of synthesizing divided opposites. Negations was absolute and alternated in a bad infinity with affirmation.

Wang Ruoshui was initially a major advocate of the Maoist One Divides into Two line during the Cultural Revolution. But Wang later advocated Marxist humanism.

== Early 1970s ==
In 1973, Foreign Languages Press published Three Major Struggles on China's Philosophical Front (1949–64). The three main philosophical debates revolved around The Theory of "Synthesized Economic Base", the Question of the Identity Between Thinking and Being, and the Theory of "Combine Two into One".

In 1974, during the Criticize Lin, Criticize Confucius, there were major historiographical debates about the relative merits of the Confucian and Legalist schools. Legalism was interpreted as the progressive feudal ideology of the rising Qin against the decaying slave-holder ideology of Confucius.

== Deng Xiaoping ==
In the post-Mao era, there were major debates on the role that contradictions and alienation played within a Socialist society. Deng Xiaoping personally intervened against the Marxist humanist trend in insisting that alienation was solely based on private property, and had no place in a socialist China.

In his 1983 speech, Deng said that:

As to alienation, after Marx discovered the law of surplus value, he used that term only to describe wage labour in capitalist society, meaning that such labour was alien to the workers themselves and was performed against their will, so that the capitalist might profit at their expense. Yet, in discussing alienation, some of our comrades go beyond capitalism; some even ignore the remaining alienation of labour under capitalism and its consequences. Rather, they allege that alienation exists under socialism and can be found in the economic, political, and ideological realms, that, in the course of its development, socialism constantly gives rise to a force of alienation, as a result of the activities of the main body of the society. Moreover, they try to explain our reform from the point of view of overcoming this alienation. Thus, they cannot help people to correctly understand and solve the problems that have arisen in socialist society today, or to correctly understand and carry out the continual reform that is essential for our technological and social advance. On the contrary, their position will only lead people to criticize, doubt, and negate socialism, to consider it as hopeless as capitalism and to renounce their confidence in the future of socialism and communism. "So what's the point of building socialism?" they say.

Despite Deng's condemnation, High Culture Fever continued to rise in China, with the work of Fredric Jameson being particularly popular.

== Jiang Zemin's "Three Represents" ==
The formal statements of CCP leader Jiang Zemin's Three Represents Theory are: The CCP must always represent the requirements of China's advanced productive forces, represents the orientation of China's advanced culture, and represents the fundamental interests of the majority of the Chinese people. The Three Represents are in light of the ideas proposed by Karl Marx and Friedrich Engels in their article "the ruling class and the ruling ideas".

First, Marx and Engels argued "to present its interest as the common interest of all the members of society, … the class making a revolution comes forward from the very start, … not as a class, but as the representative of the whole of society, as the whole mass of society confronting the one ruling class". Following Marx and Engels' ideas, the Chinese Communist Party, which took over power from feudalism through revolution, does not treat itself as the ruling class, but as the party that represents the interests of the majority of the society.

Second, from the perspective of the historically organic ideologies, "material forces are the content and ideologies are the form… the material forces would be inconceivable historically without form and the ideologies would be individual fancies without the material forces". The Chinese Communist Party perceives that the material forces are the same as the productive forces, and the ideologies are another form of cultures. To put it another way, the productive forces are the economic bases and the ideologies are the superstructure. Therefore, the Chinese Communist Party represents both the advanced productive forces and the advanced culture.

Third, "one must bring an order into this rule of ideas, prove a mystical connection among the successive ruling ideas", as indicated by Marx and Engels. The order of the Three Represents, therefore, reflects the successive ruling ideas. The Chinese Communist Party believes that the productive forces must come first than the advanced culture. Only when the Chinese people had the advanced productive forces, could they have the advanced culture. Therefore, the Chinese Communist Party represents the productive forces and then represents the advanced culture.

== The Chinese Dream ==
General Secretary of the Chinese Communist Party Xi Jinping proposed the Chinese Dream as a slogan when he visited the National Museum of China. Xi said, "young people should dare to dream, work assiduously to fulfill the dreams, and contribute to the revitalization of the nation". Marx and Engels had similar concepts in their works. They proposed a new division of labor: mental labor and material labor. Mental labors control the means of mental production, and thus, appear as the thinkers of the class and make the formation of the illusions.

The material labors are active members of the material production. Marx and Engels argued that since the material labors are, in reality, the active members of this class and have less time to make up illusions and ideas about themselves, they are passive and receptive to the mental labors' illusions.

The Chinese Dream draws knowledge from Marx and Engels' ideas about "illusions". Xi Jinping selected "dream" instead of "illusion" to reflect his ideas that Chinese people, especially the young generation, should dream. Xi did not say that the Chinese dream is made up by the mental labors. Instead, he argued that the Chinese dream should be made up by the young generation. By saying that the dream is not the ruling class's illusion but the young generations' own dream, Xi continued to recommend the young people to work hard and achieve the dream.
