= Philosophical Notebooks =

The Philosophical Notebooks (Russian: Философские тетради, Filosofskiye tetradi) of Lenin were a series of summaries and commentaries on philosophical works by Lenin. Included were works by Aristotle, Hegel, Feuerbach, Marx, and Deborin. Lenin's notes on dialectics played an influential role in Soviet and Chinese studies on contradiction and the unity of opposites. The Notebooks are often contrasted by scholars with Lenin's Materialism and Empirio-criticism.

The proper interpretation of the notebooks would play a major role in the Mechanist debate of the 1920s in the USSR, and the One Divides Into Two controversy of 1964 in China.

== See also ==
- Vladimir Lenin bibliography
