= One Divides into Two =

Ideological debate in China in 1964

The One Divides into Two (simplified Chinese: 一分为二; traditional Chinese: 一分為二; pinyin: yīfēnwéi'èr) controversy was an ideological debate about the nature of contradiction that took place in China in 1964. The concept originated in Lenin's Philosophical Notebooks and was often repeated as part of Mao Zedong's interpretation of dialectical materialism. The philosopher Yang Xianzhen originated the idea of "Two Unites into One", which he said was the primary law of dialectics. The Maoists interpreted this to mean that capitalism could be united with socialism, or that contradictory, inherently antagonistic forces could be harmonious: in both cases Yang was cast as someone condoning reconciliation and capitulation with counter-revolutionary forces and ideas. Ai Siqi wrote the original attack on Yang, and was joined by Mao himself. Wang Ruoshui also contributed to the attack. After 1976, Yang was officially rehabilitated, along with the concept of two uniting into one.

The chengyu phrase "一分为二" arose in the Taisu version of the Huangdi Neijing.

This phrase is derived from the formulation given by Vladimir Lenin in his Philosophical Notebooks; "The splitting of a single whole and the cognition of its contradictory parts ... is the essence ... of dialectics."

Alain Badiou, during his Maoist phase, would use the principle of One Divides into Two to criticize the philosophy of Gilles Deleuze.

== See also ==
- Antagonistic contradiction
- On Contradiction
