= Sufan movement =

Chinese political campaign under Mao Zedong

Sufan Movement
- Native name: 肃反运动
- Location: China
- Date: 1955–1957
- Target: Counter-revolutionaries, intellectuals, former KMT officials and political opponents of Mao Zedong, attack against "bureaucraticism" and soviet sympathetic officials
- Attack type: Political repression
- Deaths: 53,000 (Estimated)
- Victims: 214,000 (Arrested), 18 Million (Total targeted for "investigation")
- Perpetrators: Chinese Communist Party, Mao Zedong
- Motive: Elimination of political opponents of Mao Zedong, intellectuals and foreign forces

The Sufan movement was a purge of perceived opponents in the People's Republic of China between 1955 and 1957. The term "sufan" is short for sùqīng àncáng de fǎngémìng fèn zǐ (simplified Chinese: 肃清暗藏的反革命分子; traditional Chinese: 肅清暗藏的反革命分子), which means "purge to eradicate hidden counterrevolutionaries"; similar campaigns had been carried out within the Chinese Communist Party as early as 1932. Mao directed that 5 percent of counter-revolutionaries were to be eliminated. During the purge, around 214,000 people were arrested and approximately 53,000 died.

== Origins ==
The sufan campaign originated as the development of a campaign by Mao in early 1955 against Hu Feng, a Marxist literary critic, and a purported clique of writers and intellectuals who had criticised the Communist Party's restrictive policies towards literature and the arts. They called for more freedom of expression, but were persecuted as counterrevolutionaries. 81,000 intellectuals were "unmasked and punished" and another 300,000 were deprived of their civil rights on the grounds that they were "politically unreliable".

The campaign officially began after the Central Committee of the Chinese Communist Party issued a "Directive on launching a struggle to cleanse out hidden counter-revolutionary elements" (關於開展鬥爭肅清暗藏的反革命分子的指示) on 1 July 1955. On 25 August 1955, it issued "The directive on the thorough purge and cleansing of hidden counter revolutionaries" (關於徹底肅清暗藏反革命分子的指示).

== Aims and targets ==
Unlike the 1951 Zhen Fan campaign (1950–52), which principally targeted those as threats from outside the state system such as former Kuomintang officials and supporters, the sufan campaign widened to purge those within the party, military and state agencies who Mao's circle saw as threats. Several top Party officials, notably the technocrats Gao Gang and Rao Shushi, were purged in the early stages of the campaign. Many other Party members and government officials were arrested on vague suspicions of counterrevolutionary activity and were made to 'confess' their political views. The Public Security Bureaus of the Ministry of Public Security were a particular target, as the communist leadership sought to ensure that China's security forces were under tight Party control.

The People's Daily, in an attempt to provide justification for the purge, reported that ten percent of Communist Party members were secret traitors and needed to be purged. This number appears to have been taken as a quota for the number of arrests that needed to occur. There was no judicial process involved; instead, people were targeted through administrative edicts in which regular criminal procedures were ignored. 2.2 million people were reported to have been investigated by September 1955. 110,000 people were purportedly "exposed" as counterrevolutionaries, though Mao continued the campaign for a further two years in the belief that another 50,000 major suspects were still at large.

The ostensible aims of the sufan campaign were the defeat of so-called "bureaucratism" within government organisations, the generation of revolutionary fervor and the eradication of purported counterrevolutionaries within the state. Alternatively, as one writer suggests, the campaign was intended to crush opponents of the socialist transformation of industry and commerce. It was effectively a reaction by Mao against the rise of a technocratic bureaucracy dominated by pro-Soviet officials, following the implementation of China's Soviet-inspired First Five-Year Plan from 1953 onwards. Mao saw the new technocratic ethos in China's administration as a corruption of the "revolutionary spirit". The officials responsible were cast as "functional bourgeoisie" whose power was based on their bureaucratic authority rather than private property. In 1952, he was ordered to Beijing to become head of the State Planning Commission of China (SPC), where he later attempted a leadership challenge against Liu Shaoqi and Zhou Enlai.

== Outcomes ==
The campaign was brought to an end in October 1957 after more than 18 million people had been targeted. Another 11 to 12 million people were still to be investigated when the campaign was ended. Large numbers of people were sent to labor reform (Chinese: 勞動改造; pinyin: láodòng gǎizào) camps. Many were released in 1956 with official apologies for having been falsely accused. The campaign resulted in the reduction of the power of the State Planning Commission and industrial managers in state-owned enterprises, as well as a much tighter rein by the Party on the state security apparatus. It was later justified by the Party on the basis that it served to "strengthen the leadership of the Party over public-security work, to put public-security agencies under Party leadership."

According to Chinese researchers, government data (including Hu Qiaomu's figure) show that some 1.4 million intellectuals and officials were persecuted during the sufan movement. In addition, 214,000 people were arrested, 22,000 were executed and a total of 53,000 died.

Jean-Louis Margolin writes in The Black Book of Communism that one source indicates 81,000 arrests during the campaign (which he claims is rather modest), while another gives 770,000 deaths. He concludes that there is no way to determine which is accurate.

== See also ==
- Great Purge
- Hu Feng
- Campaign to Suppress Counterrevolutionaries
- Anti-rightist Campaign

== External sources ==
- 22 Years as a Class Enemy by Judith Shapiro
- High Tide of Terror, Mar. 05, 1956, Time Magazine
