= Chinese University of Hong Kong Press =

University press of the Chinese University of Hong Kong

Chinese University of Hong Kong Press 香港中文大學出版社
- Parent company: Chinese University of Hong Kong
- Status: Active
- Country of origin: China
- Headquarters location: Lady Ho Tung Hall, Chinese University of Hong Kong, Sha Tin, New Territories, Hong Kong
- Distribution: SUP Publishing Logistics (Hong Kong); Columbia University Press (US); Eurospan Group (EMEA); China Publishers Services (China); San Min Book Co. (Taiwan); Footprint Books (Australia)
- Key people: Ms Gan, Qi (Director); Ms Lin, Ying (Managing Editor); Mr Ma, Kingsley (Production Manager); Ms Wong, Angelina (Business Manager)
- Official website: cup.cuhk.edu.hk

Chinese University of Hong Kong Press
- Traditional Chinese: 香港中文大學出版社
- Simplified Chinese: 香港中文大学出版社
Transcriptions
Standard Mandarin
- Hanyu Pinyin: Xiānggǎng zhōngwén dàxué chūbǎn shè
Yue: Cantonese
- Yale Romanization: Hēung góng jūng màhn daaih hohk chēut báan séh
- Jyutping: Hoeng1 gong2 zung1 man4 daai6 hok6 ceot1 baan2 se5

The Chinese University of Hong Kong Press is the university press of the Chinese University of Hong Kong. It was established in 1977 and publishes more than 50 titles per year. Most works are on China, Hong Kong and the Chinese culture.
