= Julia C. Strauss =

American political scientist, sinologist and sociologist

Julia Candace Strauss
- Born: 1961 (age 64–65)
- Other name: 朱莉 (Zhuli)

Academic background
- Education: Connecticut College (BA); University of California, Berkeley (MA, PhD)
- Thesis: Bureaucratic Reconstitution and Institution Building in the Post-Imperial Chinese State: The Dynamics of Personnel Policy, 1912–45 (1991)

Academic work
- School or tradition: Interpretivism
- Institutions: SOAS University of London

Julia Candace Strauss (born 1961) is an American political scientist, sinologist and sociologist. She is a Professor at Department of Politics and International Studies at the SOAS University of London.

== Biography ==
After receiving a Bachelor's degree in Chinese language and European History from Connecticut College in 1983, Strauss received an Master's degree and PhD from the Department of Political Science at the University of California, Berkeley, in 1984 and 1991. In 1994, Strauss moved to the Department of Political and International Studies at SOAS University of London. From 2002 to 2011, she served as editor of The China Quarterly. In 2013, she was promoted to professor.

== Publications ==
=== Monographs ===
- State Formation in China and Taiwan: Bureaucracy, Campaign, and Performance (2019)
- Strong Institutions in Weak Polities: State Building in Republican China, 1927–1940 (1998)

=== Single edited volumes ===
- The History of the People's Republic of China (2006)

=== Co-edited volumes ===
- State Formations: Global Histories and Cultures of Statehood (2018)
- From the Great Wall to the New World: China and Latin American in the 21st Century (2012)
- Gender in Flux: Agency and Its Limits in Contemporary China (2011)
- China and Africa: Emerging Patterns in Globalization and Development (2009)
- Staging Politics: Power and Performance in Asia and Africa (2007)
