= On Contradiction =

1937 essay by Mao Zedong

- Cover art of the 1967 English version.
- Author: Mao Zedong (Mao Tse-tung)
- Original title: 矛盾论; Máodùnlùn
- Translator: Central Compilation and Translation Bureau
- Language: Chinese
- Published: 1967 (English Translation by Foreign Languages Press)
- Publication place: China

On Contradiction (simplified Chinese: 矛盾论; traditional Chinese: 矛盾論; pinyin: Máodùn Lùn; lit. 'To Discuss Contradiction') is a 1937 essay by the Chinese Communist revolutionary Mao Zedong. Along with On Practice, it forms the philosophical underpinnings of the political ideology that would later become Maoism. It was written in August 1937, as an interpretation of the philosophy of dialectical materialism, while Mao was at his guerrilla base in Yan'an. Mao suggests that all movement and life is a result of contradiction. Mao separates his paper into different sections: the two world outlooks, the universality of contradiction, the particularity of contradiction, the principal contradiction and principal aspect of contradiction, the identity and struggle of aspects of contradiction, the place of antagonism in contradiction, and finally the conclusion. Mao further develops the theme laid out in On Contradiction in his 1957 speech On the Correct Handling of Contradictions Among the People.

Mao describes existence as being made up of constant transformation and contradiction. Nothing is constant as in metaphysics and can only exist based on opposing contradictions. He uses the concept of contradiction to explain different Chinese historical time periods and social events. Mao's form of talking about contradiction creates a modified concept that brought forth the ideal of Chinese Marxism. This text continues to influence and educate Chinese Marxists.

== Historical background ==
Mao initially held views similar to a reformist or nationalist. He later said that he became a Marxist in 1919 when he took a second trip to Peking, although he had not declared his new belief at that time. In 1920, he met Chen Duxiu in Shanghai and discussed the Marxist philosophy. Mao finally officially moved toward his new ideology when the Movement of Self-Government of Hunan failed. He found a more reasonable approach to fixing society's problems in Marxism. He once said, "Class struggle, some classes triumph, others are eliminated." He understood the need for Marxist ideas and struggles in order to more effectively take on the developing world.

Like On Practice, On Contradiction was written by Mao during the Yan'an Period. On Contradiction was written while the Communists and the Nationalists were in the Second United Front against the invading Japanese forces.

Some of the points made in "On Contradiction" were drawn and expanded from lectures Mao presented in 1937 at the Counter-Japanese University in Yan'an. These lectures drew from the work of Karl Marx, Friedrich Engels, and Vladimir Lenin. Mao elaborated on their principles based on the practice of the Chinese Communist Party at the time. Mao's research was concentrated on pieces from Chinese Marxist philosophers. The most influential philosopher that Mao studied was Ai Siqi. Mao not only read Ai's works but also knew him personally. Mao studied Marxism diligently in the year before he wrote his "Lecture Notes on Dialectical Materialism." He reviewed and annotated the Soviet Union's New Philosophy in order to actively understand the dialectical materialism concept.

In addition to elaborating on his ideological and philosophic views, Mao wrote On Contradiction to help legitimize his political thinking within a Marxist framework and thus further solidify his leadership.

== Basics of Contradiction and its History ==
In dialectical materialism, contradiction, as derived by Karl Marx, usually refers to an opposition of social forces. This concept is one of the three main points of Marxism. Mao held that capitalism is internally contradictory because different social classes have conflicting collective goals. These contradictions stem from the social structure of society and inherently lead to class conflict, economic crisis, and eventually revolution, the existing order's overthrow and the formerly oppressed classes' ascension to political power. "The dialectic asserts that nothing is permanent and all things perish in time." Dialectics is the "logic of change" and can explain the concepts of evolution and transformation. Materialism refers to the existence of only one world. It also verifies that things can exist without the mind. Things existed well before humans had knowledge of them. For materialists, consciousness is the mind and it exists within the body rather than apart from it. All things are made of matter. Dialectical materialism combines the two concepts into an important Marxist ideal. Mao saw dialectics as the study of contradiction based on a statement made by Lenin.

== The Two World Outlooks ==
The published text of On Contradiction begins by addressing Lenin's distinction between a metaphysical worldview and a dialectical worldview. Mao frames the metaphysical worldview as one which treats things as unitary, static, and isolated. In contrast, Mao frames the dialectical worldview as one which views things in dynamic interaction with each other while also being characterized by their own internal contradiction. In the dialectical worldview, progress results through reconciling internal and external contradictions, resulting in new things with their own internal and external contradictions.

For a long time the metaphysical view was held by both Chinese and Europeans. Eventually in Europe, the proletariat developed the dialectical materialistic outlook, and the bourgeoisie opposed the view. Mao refers to the metaphysicians as "vulgar evolutionists." They believe in a static and unchanging world where things repeat themselves rather than changing with history. It cannot explain change and development over time. In dialectics, things are understood by their internal change and relationship with other objects. Contradiction within an object fuels its development and evolution. Hegel developed a dialectical idealism before Marx and Engels combined dialectics with materialism, and Lenin and Stalin further developed it. With dialectical materialism we can look at the concrete differences between objects and further understand their growth.

== The Universality of Contradiction ==
The absoluteness of contradiction has a twofold meaning. One is that contradiction exists in the process of development of all things, and the other is that in the process of development of each thing a movement of opposites exists from beginning to end. Contradiction is the basis of life and drives it forward. No one phenomenon can exist without its contradictory opposite, such as victory and defeat. "Unity of opposites" allows for a balance of contradiction. A most basic example of the cycle of contradiction is life and death. There are contradictions that can be found in mechanics, mathematics, science, social life, etc. Deborin claims that there is only difference found in the world. Mao combats this saying that difference is made up of contradiction and is contradiction. "No society—past, present, or future—could escape contradictions, for this was a characteristic of all matter in the universe."

== The Particularity of Contradiction ==
Mao finds the best way to talk about the relativity of contradiction is to look at it in several different parts. "The contradiction in each form of motion of matter has its particularity." This contradiction is the essence of a thing. When one can identify the particular essence, one can understand the object. These particular contradictions also differentiate one object from another. Knowledge is developed from cognition that can move from general to particular or particular to general. When old processes change, new processes and contradictions emerge. Each contradiction has its own way of being solved, and the resolution must be found accordingly to the particular contradiction. Particular contradictions also have particular aspects that have specific ways of being handled. Mao believes that one must look at things objectively when reviewing a conflict. When one is biased and subjective, he or she cannot fully understand the contradictions and aspects of an object. This is the way people should go about "studying the particularity of any kind of contradiction – the contradiction in each form of motion of matter, the contradiction in each of its processes of development, the two aspects of that contradiction in each process, the contradiction at each stage of a process, and the two aspects of the contradiction at each stage." Universality and particularity of a contradiction can be viewed as general and individual character of a contradiction. These two concepts depend on each other for existence. Mao says the idea of these two characters is necessary in understanding dialectics.

Mao observes that subjective thought can motivate humans to change their objective situation.

== The Principal Contradiction and Principal Aspect of Contradiction ==
On Contradiction introduces Mao's concepts of the "principal contradiction" and the "principal aspect of the contradiction". The principal contradiction is the contradiction whose resolution is decisive for resolving the secondary contradictions. The principal aspect of the contradiction is the side of the contradiction whose positive development will decisively resolve the contradiction.

This subject focuses on the concept of one contradiction allowing other contradictions to exist. For example, in a capitalist society, the contradiction between the proletariat and the bourgeoisie allow the other contradictions, such as the one between imperialists and their colonies. According to Mao, complex phenomena have multiple contradictions, but one can always be identified as "play[ing] the lead role". When looking at numerous contradictions, one must understand which contradiction is superior. One must also remember the principal and non-principal contradictions are not static and will, over time, transform into one another. This also causes a transformation of the nature of the thing, for the principal contradiction is what primarily defines the thing. These two different contradictions prove that nothing is created equally by showing the lack of balance that allows one contradiction to be superior to another. Mao uses examples in Chinese history and society to symbolize the concept of a principal contradiction and its continual changing. "Neither imperialist oppression of the colonies nor the fate of the colonies to suffer under that oppression can last forever." Based on the idea of contradiction, one day, the oppression will end and the colonies will gain power and freedom.

== The Identity and Struggle of Aspects of Contradiction ==
Mao defines identity as two different thoughts: the two aspects of contradiction coexist and aspects can transform into one another. Any one aspect is dependent on the existence of at least one other aspect. Without death, there could be no life; without unhappiness, there could be no joy. Mao finds the more important point to also be a factor of identity; contradictions can transform into one another. In certain situations and under certain conditions, the contradictions coexist and change into one another. Identity both separates the contradictions and allows for the struggle between the contradictions; the identity is the contradiction. The two contradictions in an object inspire two forms of movement, relative rest and conspicuous change. Initially, an object changes quantitatively and seems to be at rest. Eventually, the culmination of the changes from the initial movement causes the object to seem to be conspicuously changing. Objects are constantly going through this process of motion; however, struggle between opposites happens in both states and is only solved in the second. Transformation is motivated by the unity between contradictions. Particular condition of movement and the general condition of movement both are conditions under which contradictions can move. This movement is absolute and considered a struggle.

== The Place of Antagonism in Contradiction ==
Antagonistic contradiction (Chinese: 矛盾; pinyin: máodùn) is the impossibility of compromise between different social classes. The term is usually attributed to Vladimir Lenin, although he may never have actually used the term in any of his written works. The term is most often applied in Maoist theory, which holds that differences between the two primary classes, the working class/proletariat and the bourgeoisie are so great that there is no way to bring about a reconciliation of their views. Because the groups involved have diametrically opposed concerns, their objectives are so dissimilar and contradictory that no mutually acceptable resolution can be found. Non-antagonistic contradictions may be resolved through mere debate, but antagonistic contradictions can only be resolved through struggle. In Maoism, the antagonistic contradiction was usually that between the peasantry and the landowning class. Mao Zedong expressed his views on the policy in his famous February 1957 speech On the Correct Handling of Contradictions Among the People. Mao focuses on antagonistic contradiction as the "struggle of opposites." It is an absolute and universal concept. When one tries to solve the conflict of antagonistic contradictions, one must find his solution based on each situation. As in any other concept, there are two sides. There can be antagonistic contradictions and non-antagonistic contradictions. Contradiction and antagonism are not equals and one can exist without the other. Also, contradictions do not have to develop into antagonistic ones. An example of antagonism and non-antagonism can be found in two opposing states. They may continually struggle and disagree due to their opposite ideologies, but they will not always be at war against one another. Avoiding antagonism requires an open space to allow the contradictions to emerge and be solved objectively. The non-antagonistic contradictions "exist among 'the people'," and the antagonistic contradictions are "between the enemy and the people."

== Conclusion ==
In the conclusion, Mao sums up all the points that were made in his essay. The law of contradictions is a fundamental basis for dialectical materialistic thought. Contradiction is present in all things and allows all objects to exist. Contradiction depends on other contradictions to exist and can transform itself into another contradiction. Contradictions are separated by superiority and can sometimes have antagonistic relationships with one another. Each contradiction is particular to certain objects and gives objects identity. Understanding all of Mao's points will give one an understanding of this dense topic of Marxist thought.

== Influence ==
On Contradiction, along with Mao's text On Practice, elevated Mao's reputation as a Marxist theoretician. It became a foundational text of Mao Zedong Thought. After Mao was celebrated in the Eastern Bloc following China's intervention in the Korean War, both texts became widely read in the USSR.

In April 1960, Petroleum Minister Yu Qiuli stated that On Contradiction (along with On Practice) would be the ideological core of the campaign to develop the Daqing Oil Field in northeast China. Yu's efforts to mobilize workers in Daqing focused on ideological motivation rather than material incentives. The Ministry of the Petroleum Industry shipped thousands of copies of the texts by plane so that every Daqing oil worker would have copies and for work units to each set up their own study groups. The successful completion of Daqing despite harsh weather conditions and supply limitations became a model held up by the Communist Party as an example during subsequent industrialization campaigns.

== Published texts ==
- Mao, Tse-tung (1965) [1937]. "On Contradiction". Selected Works of Mao Tse-tung. Vol. 1. Beijing: Foreign Languages Press. pp. 311–347. ISBN 0-08-022980-8.
  - Mao, Zedong (1991) [1937]. "Máodùn lùn" 矛盾论 [On Contradiction]. Máo Zédōng xuǎnjí 毛泽东选集 [Selected Works of Mao Tse-tung]. Vol. 1 (2nd ed.). Beijing: People's Publishing House. pp. 299–340. ISBN 978-7-01-000922-3.
