= On the Correct Handling of Contradictions Among the People =

1957 essay by Mao Zedong

On the Correct Handling of Contradictions Among the People (Chinese: 关于正确处理人民内部矛盾的问题) is a 1957 essay by the Chinese Communist revolutionary Mao Zedong published during the Eleventh Session of the Supreme State Conference. It explores the concepts developed by Mao in the 1937 publication On Contradiction concerning dialectical reasoning, and sets out to establish a social philosophy based on these concepts.

== Development of text ==
The essay originated in a speech to the Communist Party on 27 February 1957. After incorporating ideas from Liu Shaoqi and Zhou Enlai, it which was revised and printed in the Peoples Daily on 19 June 1957. Thus, it was delivered during the Hundred Flowers Campaign and published during the Anti-Rightist Campaign.

The text was a political intervention by Mao to address the question of who "the people" are in a socialist system and how national politics within a socialist system should be handled.

== Major points ==
In On the Correct Handling of Contradictions Among the People, Mao discusses the contradictions still existing in socialist society. According to Mao:

In socialist society, the basic contradiction is still the contradiction between productive relations and productivity and between the superstructure and the economic foundation. However, these contradictions in socialist society are fundamentally different in nature and circumstances between those in the productive relations and productive forces of the old society and between the superstructure and the economic base.

Mao describes the contradictions in the old society as ones which could not be satisfied by capitalism itself and which required socialist revolution. In contrast, contradictions within the socialist society could be handled by the people within the socialist system on a continuous basis.

The main point of On the Correct Handling of Contradictions Among the People was to make a distinction between contradictions among the people and contradictions between the people and the enemy and that these contradictions should be treated differently. The text emphasized that correctly handling contradictions should be the major theme of national political life.

Contradictions among the people were not antagonistic. To resolve contradictions among the people, it was necessary to use democratic methods, educational methods, and "unity-criticism-unity" methods. Contradictions among the people should be addressed to prevent them from intensifying or becoming contradictions between the Party and the enemy. Based on the experience of the United Front, On the Correct Handling of Contradictions Among the People explains that contradictions between the working class and the national bourgeoise of China generally fall within this category. Mao also stated that intellectuals should be considered part of "the people" and should help give their concerns a voice. On the Correct Handling of Contradictions Among the People also demonstrates a view of class struggle in which class became less a matter of economic relations and increasingly a matter of revolutionary consciousness.

Regarding the environment of the then-pending Hundred Flowers Campaign, Mao wrote that even ideas that are initially viewed as "poisonous weeds" by society may ultimately be found correct:

To determine whether something is right or wrong frequently takes a trial period. In history, new and correct things often could not win recognition from the majority of people at the start, and they had to move forward by twists and turns in struggle. People tend to deny correct things, good things, as fragrant flowers from the outset; instead they regard them as poisonous weeds. Copernicus' theory of the solar system and Darwin's theory of evolution were both regarded at one time as erroneous, and both experienced bitter struggle.

In the context of ethnic relations, Mao observed that overcoming Han chauvinism was "the key to getting Han-minority relations right".

The slogan serve the people appears in On the Correct Handling of Contradictions Among the People, where Mao writes that "state organs must rely on the people, and the staff of state organs must serve the people."

Mao also discussed frugality and productivity in the economic development of China, writing, "It is a great contradiction for all cadres and all people to always think of our country as a big socialist country, but also a poor country with economic backwardness. To make our country prosperous and strong, it will take decades of frugal accumulation, including the implementation of hard work and thrift in economic construction."

Mao also wrote that the question of "which will win," socialism or capitalism, "has not been really resolved yet."

=== Antagonistic contradiction ===
Contradictions between the people and the enemy were antagonistic contradictions.

Antagonistic contradiction (Chinese language: 矛盾) is the notion that compromise between different social classes is impossible, and their relations must be of class struggle. The term is most often applied in Maoist theory, which holds that differences between the two primary classes, the working class/proletariat and the bourgeoisie are so great that there is no way to bring about a reconciliation of their views. Because the groups involved have diametrically opposed concerns, their objectives are so dissimilar and contradictory that no mutually acceptable resolution can be found. Nonantagonistic contradictions may be resolved through mere debate, but antagonistic contradictions can only be resolved through struggle.

The term is usually attributed to Vladimir Lenin, although he may never have actually used the term in any of his written works.

In Maoism, the antagonistic contradiction was usually that between the peasantry and the landowning class. Mao Zedong expressed his views on the policy in his famous February 1957 speech "On the Correct Handling of Contradictions Among the People."

The Chinese term for contradiction (矛盾; máodùn) literally means spear (矛; máo) and shield (盾; dùn). It derives from the Han Feizi: "There was once a man in the state of Chu, who was selling shields and lances. He was praising them saying: 'My shields are so firm, that there is nothing that can pierce them.' He praised his lances saying: 'My lances are so sharp, that there is nothing that they cannot pierce.' Someone asked: 'What if you used your lances to pierce your shields?' The man could not answer. A shield that cannot be pierced and a lance that can pierce everything cannot exist in the same world." (Irresistible force paradox)

== Impact ==
On the Correct Handling of Contradictions Among the People, along with Ten Major Relationships, was an important part of the theoretical efforts to incorporate Marxism into the Chinese context and China's efforts to develop socialism. On the Correct Handling of Contradictions Among the People was a major milestone in the localization of Marxism within China and an important aspect of Mao Zedong Thought.

An immediate consequence of the text's dissemination was that people were inspired to speak out in the gradually opening social spaces of critique. This helped lead to the Hundred Flowers Campaign.

== See also ==
- On Contradiction
- One Divides Into Two
