= Hu Ping (writer) =

Chinese writer (born 1947)

Hu Ping 胡平
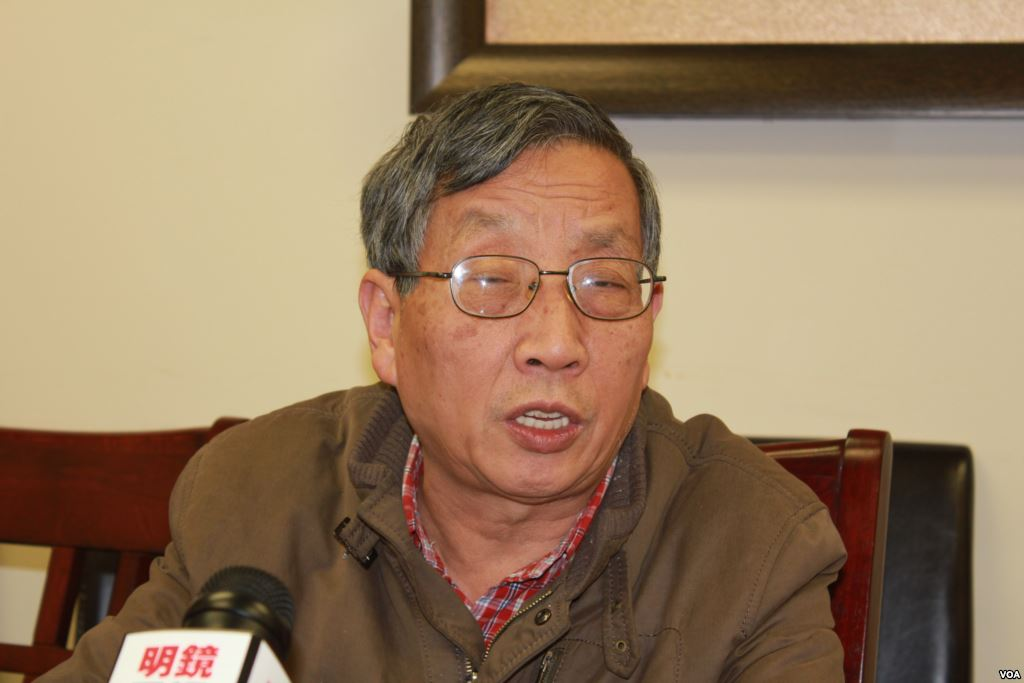
- Born: 19 August 1947 (age 79)
- Occupation: Writer
- Children: 2
- Writing career
- Period: 1975 - Present

Hu Ping (born 19 August 1947) is a Chinese writer, essayist, and political activist known for his advocacy of liberalism, democracy and human rights in China.

== Life ==
Born in 1947 in Beijing, he was raised in Sichuan. In 1966, he joined the Red Guards during the Cultural Revolution and was later sent to the countryside as part of the Down to the Countryside Movement. He returned to Chengdu in 1973 and worked various temporary jobs. In 1978, he was admitted to the Philosophy Department at Peking University, where he earned a master's degree in philosophy.

Hu Ping became active in the Democracy Wall Movement in 1979, advocating for political reform and freedom of speech. In 1980, he was elected as a delegate to the People's Congress representing Haidian District in Beijing. He later moved to the United States, where he continued his advocacy for democracy and human rights.

In 1987, he began doctoral studies at Harvard; a year later, he moved to New York to serve as the chairman of an organization supporting China's burgeoning democracy movement. The Chinese government revoked his passport and sent him into exile.

He served as the chairman of the Chinese Alliance for Democracy from 1988 to 1991 and is the editor of the Chinese-language magazine Beijing Spring. He has authored several works, including On Freedom of Speech and The Road to Democracy in China. Hu Ping's writings and activism have made him a prominent figure in the Chinese pro-democracy movement, and continue to inspire those advocating for political reform and human rights in China.

Hu has edited the pro-democracy journal Beijing Spring.

== Thought ==
He read the essay "The Liberalism of Fear" by Harvard Professor Judith N. Shklar, which traces modern Western liberalism to an aversion to religious and political persecution—a sentiment that drives the commitment to protecting human rights and limiting political power. Hu Ping argues that China’s rediscovery of liberalism stems from remarkably similar experiences. The Cultural Revolution unleashed widespread and deep-seated terror. Even a number of Communist Party leaders came to appreciate the value of freedom as a result of their own personal suffering.

== Major Works ==
- On Freedom of Speech (1975, 1976, 1977, 1979, 1980)
- Philosophical Discussion on my country's Economic Reform (1985)
- Philosophical Notes (1988)
- Give Me a Pivot (1988)
- Between Ideal and Reality (1990)
- Reflections on China's Democracy Movement (1992)
- Starting from Freedom (1994)
- One-Sided Statement (1998)
- Human Domestication, Evasion and Rebellion (1999)
- Cynicism (2005)
- Falun Gong Phenomenon (2005)
