= Anti-Bolshevik League incident =

Political purge in Jiangxi province

The Anti-Bolshevik League incident, or AB League Incident (AB tuan shijian, AB 团事件), was a period of political purge in the territory of a Chinese Communist revolutionary base in Jiangxi province. Mao Zedong accused his political rivals of belonging to the Kuomintang intelligence agency "Anti-Bolshevik League". Mao's political purge resulted in killings at Futian and elsewhere, and the trial and execution of Red Army officers and soldiers.

The campaign was characterised by summary executions, torture and mass arrests.

The purges are widely considered a key step in Mao's consolidating of political and personal power within the Party.

== Background and Origins ==
One account says that in December 1926, the Kuomintang in Jiangxi created a counter-intelligence organization, known as Anti-Bolshevik League, to deal with the Chinese Communist Party (CCP) and emergent state of civil war. The league supposedly consisted of handful of people and was dissolved following the April Second Uprising of 1927 in Nanchang.

According to Agnes Smedley's 1934 account in China's Red Army Marches, another body called the "Social Democrats" was involved - allied to but separate from the alleged Anti-Bolshevik League. It was in favor of moderate land reform and of reducing rents but not of abolishing landlords.

In September 1928, Mao led a relatively small purge in his Jinggang Mountains base against "opportunists". This event has been considered a prototype for the style of purge that would later be expanded during the AB League purges, one that combined rectification of the party with the elimination of 'counterrevolutionaries'.

In February 1930, Mao convened the February 7 Conference, where he launched a harsh attack on local commanders in southwest Jiangxi, accusing them of "serious political errors" surrounding land confiscation and accusations of undermining Mao's political appointees in the area. The conference labelled the local military leaders as "rich-peasant elements" and resulted in the expulsion and replacement of the leaders.

== The Purge ==
=== Launching of the purge ===
On 16 February 1930, the Fourth Red Army Frontline Committee, of which Mao was secretary, issued Notice No. 1, which formally declared the start of a campaign which aimed to "purge landlords and rich peasants". The notice stated that those counterrevolutionary elements were clogging all levels of the Party and preventing the execution of their mission. That without a "thorough purge... the revolution will basically fail".

This document launched the two-year long purge that would spread across the area of the Fourth Red Army and particularly the southwest of Jiangxi. In the Southwest Jiangxi Soviet Government, one in four party members was labelled as a member of the AB-League, with most being killed.

Broadly, the campaign was marked by widespread mass-arrests, torture and summary executions. Many confessions relied on sustained torture.

In late June 1930, the Southwest Jiangxi Special Committee issued a further directive that resulted in the acceleration of the purge, including to upper-level organs of the Party. In September, the Committee issued a notice which established a policy of torture and "killing without amnesty".

These notices were vigorously enforced, and by October 1930, more than 1,000 Party Members - out of around 30,000 members in the region - had been purged.

=== Mao's involvement and initial escalation of the Purge ===
At this point, Mao Zedong became considerably more personally involved in the purge, he wrote a letter to the Party's Central Committee in October stating that the Jiangxi area was in a "state of major crisis", and that leading organs at all levels were "packed with [the] AB Leage".

Following this letter, in a month an additional 4,400 members of the Red Army were 'identified' as members of the AB League and executed. This stage of the purge was largely focused on the First Front Red Army (the First and Third Group Armies) under Mao's own command. It also saw the detention of Li Wenlin, a senior cadre who had assumed the post of Jiangxi Province Action Committee in August and was in charge of implementing the purge in many areas. Li would be executed in 1932.

In December 1930, Mao sent a further letter to the provincial Action Committee instructing them to "find even more important people" within the supposed AB-League.

The rebellion, known as the Futian incident, highlighted the friction that existed between factions of the Red Army during the early days of the Communist revolution. The incident vindicated Mao's position as leader of the Red Army, with Generals Zhu De and Peng Dehuai giving their unequivocal support, despite their political differences.

==== Futian Incident ====
On 12 December 1930, the Futian Incident, occurred, where a battalion of the Twentieth Red Army stormed the town of Futian and surrounded the provincial Action Committee. The faction claimed that Mao was attempting to arrest Zhu De and Peng Dehuai, and surrender to the KMT army. They released key prisoners arrested in the purge and fled around 100 km west to a neighbouring soviet.

Following the Futian Incident, Mao published a letter that declared the incident a revolt and use it to justify the continuing AB-League purge.

At this point, the purge had safeguarded the authority of the General Front Line Committee within the Jiangxi Soviet, as well as Mao's personal authority.

==== Central Committee investigations ====
In January 1931, the Politburo of the Chinese Communist Party abolished Mao's General Front Line Committee and appointed Mao as a member of the Central Bureau and vice chairman of a Central Revolutionary Military Committee, which was chaired by Xiang Ying, a member of the Politburo Standing Committee who had been dispatched to Jiangxi from Shanghai.

Xiang supported Mao but attempted to water-down the ferocity of the purges in favour of a more conciliatory approach. Xiang held that the Futian mutiny was an "unprincipled faction struggle" rather than a counterrevolutionary insurrection. This view was made explicit by Notice No. 11 from the Central Committee.

As party of this conciliatory effort, Xiang encouraged the leaders of the Futian Incident to return to battle in fighting Nationalist troops in Jiangxi. However, following power struggles in the CCP's Central Committee, Xiang's handling of the situation was overturned and the mutineers were executed.

==== Mao reasserts control ====
Shortly after Xiang's arrival the Communist Party's Central Committee changed course, influenced by a visit from Pavel Mif with the Comintern's Far Eastern Bureau, affirming that the Futian Incident was a "counterrevolutionary insurrection". At this stage, the Central Committee dispatched a further delegation, led by Ren Bishi, to investigate the incident. Crucially, in a 23 February letter, it appointed Mao's General Front Line Committee as the leading body in the province, and explicitly stipulated that prior to the arrival of the Central Committee's delegation, Mao would hold the highest authority.

In mid-April the delegation arrived in Jiangxi and affirmed Mao's assessment of the situation, criticising Xiang's handling.

=== The purge reignites ===
Following Mao's establishment of authority in the Soviet, the four-month hiatus to the purge under Xiang's leadership ended. Instead of viewing the execution of the Futian mutineers as a signal that the AB-league had been eliminated, Mao instead insisted that it required an even greater attack on subversive elements.

According to the historian Gao Hua, "beginning from April 1931 the [purge] spread like wildfire, reaching its climax between May and July". In some areas, more than 90 percent of cadres were labelled as members of the Anti-Bolshevik League, being either executed, detained or dismissed. Torture was widespread in inducing 'confessions', with over 120 methods of torture used against suspects.

== Further developments ==
In September 1956, Mao admitted that the purges, in particular the Futian incident, were a mistake, in which the wrong people were killed. In 1988, President Yang Shangkun commissioned an investigation into the Futian incident, which recommended the rehabilitation of the victims, but it was never followed up due to the 1989 Tiananmen Square protests and massacre.
