= Yang Kuisong =

Chinese historian (born 1953)

Yang Kuisong (simplified Chinese: 杨奎松; traditional Chinese: 楊奎松; pinyin: Yáng Kuísōng; born October 1953) is a Chinese historian. His work covers the history of the Chinese Communist Party. He is currently a professor of history at the East China Normal University, a researcher at the Si-Mian Institute for Advanced Study in Humanities (a research institute affiliated to East China Normal University), and concurrently holds a position as a professor at Peking University.

== Life ==
In 1982, he received his bachelor's degree in Party History from Renmin University. From January 1982 to February 1987, he worked as an editor in the Central Party School of the Chinese Communist Party. Between 1987 and 1990, he was a professor of Party History at Renmin University. From there, he was appointed as a researcher of contemporary history at the Chinese Academy of Social Sciences, a professor of history at Peking University, and a special appointed professor of history at East China Normal University.

His research focus is the history of modern China, the history of the Chinese Communist Party, Sino-Soviet relations, the relationship between the Kuomintang and the CCP, and the intellectual history of socialism.
