= Futian incident =

Purge of the Chinese Red Army

- Part of Chinese Civil War and the Jiangxi Soviet
| Date | December 1930 |
| Location | Futian, Jiangxi, China |
| Result | Victory of Mao Zedong's faction; suppression of the Futian mutiny |

Belligerents
| Chinese Red Army (Mao Zedong faction) | Futian Battalion (20th Corps mutineers) |

Commanders and leaders
| Mao Zedong | Liu Di (executed) |

Strength
| Unknown | Approximately one battalion |

Casualties and losses
| Unknown | Most mutineers executed; estimates vary |

The Futian incident (Chinese: 富田事变; pinyin: Fùtián shìbiàn) is the common title for the December 1930 purge of a battalion of the Jiangxi-Fujian Soviet's "Red Army" at Futian (now in Ji'an's Qingyuan District). The Futian battalion's leaders had mutinied against Mao Zedong's purge of the Jiangxi Action Committee, ordered on the pretext of its alleged connection to the Anti-Bolshevik League and ties to Trotskyism.

== Background ==
In response to the Anti-Bolshevik League incident, the Futian battalion rebelled against Mao, claiming that Mao was attempting to arrest generals Zhu De and Peng Dehuai, and surrender to the KMT army. The officers of the first battalion, 174 regiment, 20th Corps, led by Liu Di (刘敌) retreated to the town of Yongyang, where they raised banners reading 'Down with Mao Zedong!' and sent appeals to the CCP Central Committee in Shanghai. In response to the rebellion, in June 1931, Mao called the troops and their officers to a meeting, saying that they would discuss and resolve their differences. 200 came to a local hall, but as soon as they were all seated, troops who were loyal to Mao disarmed them and executed them.

During the Futian incident Zhu De and Peng Dehuai were unequivocal supporters of Mao, despite their different political positions. This allowed Mao's position as leader of the Red Army to be vindicated.

== Further developments ==
In September 1956, Mao admitted that the purges during the Anti-Bolshevik League incident, as well as the Futian incident, were a mistake, in which the wrong people were killed. In 1988, President Yang Shangkun commissioned an investigation into the Futian incident, which recommended the rehabilitation of the victims, but it was never followed up due to the 1989 Tiananmen Square protests and massacre.

== See also ==
- Chinese Soviet Republic
- Anti-Bolshevik League incident
