= Zhu Xi (biologist) =

Chinese cell biologist (1900-1962)

- 朱洗
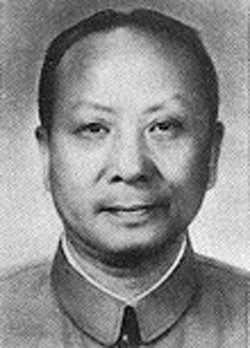
- Born: Zhu Yongchang; 1900; Linhai, Taizhou, Zhejiang Province, Qing China
- Died: July 24, 1962 (aged 61); Shanghai, People's Republic of China
- Education: Montpellier University
- Known for: Experimental biology Cell biology
- Scientific career
- Fields: Cell biology
- Workplaces: Montpellier University; Sun Yat-sen University; Beiping Research Institute; Chinese Academy of Sciences

Chinese name
- Chinese: 朱洗
Transcriptions
Standard Mandarin
- Hanyu Pinyin: Zhū Xǐ
- Wade–Giles: Chu^{1} Hsi^{3}

Birth name
- Chinese: 朱永昌
Transcriptions
Standard Mandarin
- Hanyu Pinyin: Zhū Yǒngchāng

Courtesy name
- Chinese: 玉文
Transcriptions
Standard Mandarin
- Hanyu Pinyin: Yù Wén

Zhu Xi (Chinese: 朱洗; pinyin: Zhū Xǐ; 1900 (Note: Zhu Xi's birth date is listed as September 13, 1900, according to the Taizhou website. The Shanghai Institute for the Biological Sciences, of the Chinese Academy of Sciences, lists his birth date as October 14, 1900, according to its educational website.) – July 24, 1962), born Zhu Yongchang, courtesy name Yu Wen, was a Chinese biologist, anarchist and a pioneer of cell biology and experimental embryology in the People's Republic of China. He was a public opponent of the Eliminate Sparrows campaign in the 1950s, for which his grave was desecrated during the Cultural Revolution.

== Biography ==
Zhu Xi was born in 1900 to a farming family in the village of Dianqian (Chinese: 店前), Linhai, Taizhou, Zhejiang Province. He began his studies at a private school at the age of eight. In 1915, he entered Huipu Higher Primary School, where he was elected chairman of the student council and head of the public welfare department. In June 1918, he graduated second in his class from the fourth graduating class of Huipu Higher Primary School. In the autumn of 1918, he entered Zhejiang Provincial Sixth Middle School (the predecessor of today's Taizhou Middle School). In the early summer of 1919, the May Fourth Movement broke out. Nineteen-year-old Zhu Xi participated by inciting student unrest and advocating for a strike, for which he was subsequently expelled.

Upon learning that Cai Yuanpei, Li Shizeng, and other anarchists were recruiting young people in Shanghai to study in Europe as part of the Work-Study Movement, Zhu Xi traveled from Linhai to Shanghai. In Shanghai, he worked as a typesetter at The Commercial Press for a year, and met Wu Zhihui and other influential Chinese anarchists of the period. He went to France for work-study in the summer of 1920.

In France, he became fascinated by anarchism, which would have a lifelong influence on him, and visited French anarchist leader Jean Grave in 1923. He was an apprentice and worker in several factories, working during the day and studying French and other subjects at night. In the winter of 1925, he was admitted to the Department of Biology at the University of Montpellier in Paris, where he studied under Eugène Bataillon, a French embryologist. The two of them conducted research on parthenogenesis in frogs. In 1931, Zhu Xi passed the examination of the French Academy of Sciences and received his French doctoral degree, with his academic paper "Cellular Research on Hybridization of Tailless Animals".

In the winter of 1932, Zhu Xi returned to China and subsequently went to Guangzhou. From 1933 to early 1935, he served as a professor in the Department of Biology at Sun Yat-sen University. In the spring of 1933, Zhu founded Dianqian Primary School in the ancestral hall of his hometown, the village of Dianqian; he funded the school himself, serving as principal and personally teaching classes. When he returned to Guangzhou to keep teaching at Sun Yat-sen University, the school was managed by his younger brother.

During his time at Sun Yat-sen University, he collaborated with professors Dong Shuangqiu (head of the Biology Department), Zhang Zuoren, Fei Hongnian, Zhang Xiti (head of the Geology Department), and Lin Chunnian from the School of Medicine to expose the fraudulent claims of Luo Guangting, a professor at Canton Kwong Wah Medical College, who falsely asserted that he had invented “biological spontaneous generation.”

In early 1935, Zhu left Sun Yat-sen University after accepting a position as a research fellow at the Institute of Zoology of Beiping Research Institute. From 1935 to 1937, Zhu Xi worked at the Institute of Zoology while serving as a professor at the Sino-French University. In 1937, at the suggestion of Li Shizeng, director of the Beiping Research Institute, Zhu founded the Shanghai Institute of Biology, serving as both research fellow and director. After the Battle of Shanghai broke out later that year, Zhu found himself in difficult circumstances. His laboratory work was forced to stop, and his source of income was almost cut off. He stayed with friends and continued to write.

In 1942, following the outbreak of the Pacific War, Zhu was forced to return to his hometown of Linhai, where he founded the Linshan Agricultural School. From 1942 to 1945, he served as both principal and teacher there.

In 1945, following the victory of the War of Resistance Against Japan, Zhu Xi returned to Shanghai, serving as a researcher and director at the Shanghai Institute of Biology, and as a researcher and director at the Institute of Physiology of Beiping Research Institute. Shortly afterward, at the invitation of Luo Zongluo, president of National Taiwan University, he concurrently served as professor and head of the Department of Zoology at National Taiwan University.

In the spring of 1949, Zhu Xi returned to Shanghai from Taipei. After the establishment of the People’s Republic of China, from 1950 to 1952, he worked as a researcher and head of the Department of Developmental Physiology at the Institute of Experimental Biology of the Chinese Academy of Sciences. From 1953 to 1957, he served as researcher and deputy director at the same institute. During this period, in 1955, Zhu Xi was elected as an academician of the Chinese Academy of Sciences. From 1958 to 1962, he served as researcher and director of the Institute of Experimental Biology. In 1956, he was awarded the title of National Advanced Producer by the State Council. In 1958, he was elected as a delegate to the 2nd National People’s Congress. From 1954 to 1962, he was also a representative of the Shanghai People’s Congress and a member of the Shanghai People’s Committee.

On July 24, 1962, Zhu Xi died of bronchial cancer in Shanghai.

== Legacy ==
=== Grave desecration during the Cultural Revolution ===
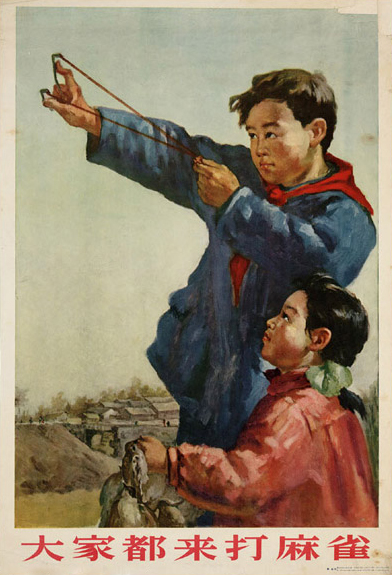
School students were among those mobilized to carry out the campaign. This 1956 promotional poster shows children killing sparrows with a slingshot. The text reads "Everyone Comes to Attack Sparrows" (Chinese: 大家都来打麻雀; pinyin: dàjiā dōu lái dǎ máquè).

The Eliminate Sparrows campaign, also known as the Smash Sparrows campaign or Great Sparrow Campaign, was a part of the Four Pests campaign launched by Mao Zedong, the first leader of the People's Republic of China, executed nationwide during the Great Leap Forward. The aim of the campaign was to completely eliminate sparrows throughout China.

The anti-sparrow policy was active from 1955 to 1960, with major implementation of the campaign starting in 1958. At least 200 million sparrows were killed nationwide in 1958; some sources say about 2.11 billion sparrows died. The campaign led to surging insect populations and poor harvests, and was one of the causes of the Great Chinese Famine, which lasted from 1959 to 1961 and killed millions of people.

After the 1959 Lushan Conference, Mao Zedong launched the Anti-Right Deviation Struggle, demanding that the whole country "oppose right-leaning tendencies and boost morale" to achieve a greater leap forward.

Nevertheless, Zhu Xi, director of the Institute of Experimental Biology of the Chinese Academy of Sciences (who had almost been labeled a rightist in the 1957 Anti-Rightist Movement), Feng Depei, a researcher at the Institute of Physiology of the Chinese Academy of Sciences, neurophysiologist Zhang Xiangtong, and other scientists demanded that sparrows be "rehabilitated." On November 27, 1959, Zhang Jingfu, secretary of the Party Group of the Chinese Academy of Sciences, wrote a report to Mao on the issue of sparrows, incorporating the views of national and foreign scientists. The report was forwarded to Mao Zedong by Hu Qiaomu, and Mao Zedong approved it two days later, saying that "Zhang Jingfu's report should be distributed to all comrades." Following the arrangements of the Party Group of the Chinese Academy of Sciences, the Biological Division of the Chinese Academy of Sciences held symposiums on the issue of sparrows on December 29, 1959, and January 9, 1960, to plan the establishment of a "Sparrow Research Coordination Group" that would conduct research on sparrows' benefits and harms. Subsequently, a coordination group composed of personnel from relevant state organs and numerous research units, headed by Tong Dizhou, director of the Biological Division of the Chinese Academy of Sciences, was formally established on March 4, 1960.

On March 18, 1960, Mao Zedong wrote "Instructions of the CCP Central Committee on Health Work", stating: "Stop killing sparrows, and replace them with bedbugs. The slogan is 'Eliminate rats, bedbugs, flies, and mosquitoes'." On April 10, 1960, the Second Session of the 2nd National People's Congress discussed the "Revised Draft of the Outline" produced in October 1957, which changed Article 27 on eliminating the four pests to "Starting in 1956, within twelve years, rats, bedbugs, flies, and mosquitoes should be eliminated in all possible places." This marked the official end of the Eliminate Sparrows campaign.

The Cultural Revolution broke out in 1966. Although scientist Zhu Xi, who had prominently opposed the Eliminate Sparrows campaign, had died in 1962, he was still accused of publicly opposing Mao. As a result, his grave was desecrated, and his bones were exhumed by Red Guards. Ornithologist Tso-hsin Cheng, who had also expressed reservations about the Eliminate Sparrows campaign, was also accused of using the issue to oppose Chairman Mao, the Great Leap Forward, and Mao's supreme instructions, among other crimes, and was subjected to brutal struggle sessions.

== Scientific achievements ==
Zhu Xi conducted long-term studies on the maturation and fertilization of oocytes in amphibians, fish, and silkworms. He discovered that the degree of egg maturation was closely related to the normal development of the embryo, and that the mucous membrane produced by the oviduct played an important role in fertilization. He also developed a method for inducing ovulation in isolated toad ovaries.

In 1959, working with associate researcher Wang Youlan at the Institute of Experimental Biology, Zhu succeeded in cultivating the world’s first “fatherless” female toad. In 1961, he enabled artificially produced parthenogenetic female toads to mate with male toads and successfully produce offspring, demonstrating that higher animals engaging in parthenogenesis still retained hereditary capacity. His research on mixed-sperm hybridization in domesticated silkworms revealed that supernumerary sperm from different breeds could influence the genetic traits of the offspring.

In applied science, Zhu and his collaborators solved key problems in the introduction, domestication, overwintering, and selective breeding of the castor silkworm. They also applied chorionic gonadotropin to induce artificial spawning, egg hatching, and fry cultivation of pond-bred fish such as silver carp and bighead carp.

== Publications ==
Zhu Xi's papers were compiled and published in two volumes called the Collected Papers of Zhu Xi (Chinese: 朱洗论文集). He authored and translated more than 20 books, including the monograph The Evolution of Life (Chinese: 生物的进化), and the translations Zoology, co-authored with Zhang Zuoren, and Vertebrate Development (Chinese: 脊椎动物发生学). In addition, he published eight popular science books in the Biology Series (Chinese: 生物学丛书).

As an anarchist, he also translated Peter Kropotkin's Mutual Aid: A Factor of Evolution and frequently referenced Kropotkin's ideas in his writings.
