= Jean Eugène Bataillon =

French biologist

Jean Eugène Bataillon (22 October 1864 – 1 November 1953), also known as Eugène Bataillon, was a French zoologist who studied embryology and fertilization.

Bataillon was born in Annoire, Jura, in northeastern France. He was the son of a stonemason, but chose not to follow his studies, leading to a religious career. He went to the Collège d’Arbois and studied philosophy while teaching at the Belfort high school. He then studied in Lyon under Fernand Arloing. He became an assistant in zoology at the University of Lyon in 1887, and trained under Laurent Chabry. His doctoral thesis was on the metamorphosis of amphibians (1891).

He joined the faculty as a lecturer in zoology at Lyon and moved to Dijon the next year. In 1903, he became the first professor of general biology. He discovered the phenomenon of traumatic parthenogenesis in amphibians. Bataillon injected fluids (saline, sugar and blood serum) into the eggs of amphibians and fishes, triggering the activation and cleavage of the eggs. The embryo, however, aborted in his early experiments. He believed it was osmotic pressure that was the trigger, and later found the pressure could be reduced by just puncturing the eggs with platinum stylets. He was able to produce normal parthenogenetic larvae in Rana temporaria in 1910. One of his students was Chinese biologist Zhu Xi, who returned to China as a researcher and prominently opposed the Eliminate Sparrows campaign in the 1950s.

Bataillon retired in 1932 and moved to Montpellier.
