= Diligent Work–Frugal Study Movement =

Chinese work-study programs to France and Belgium

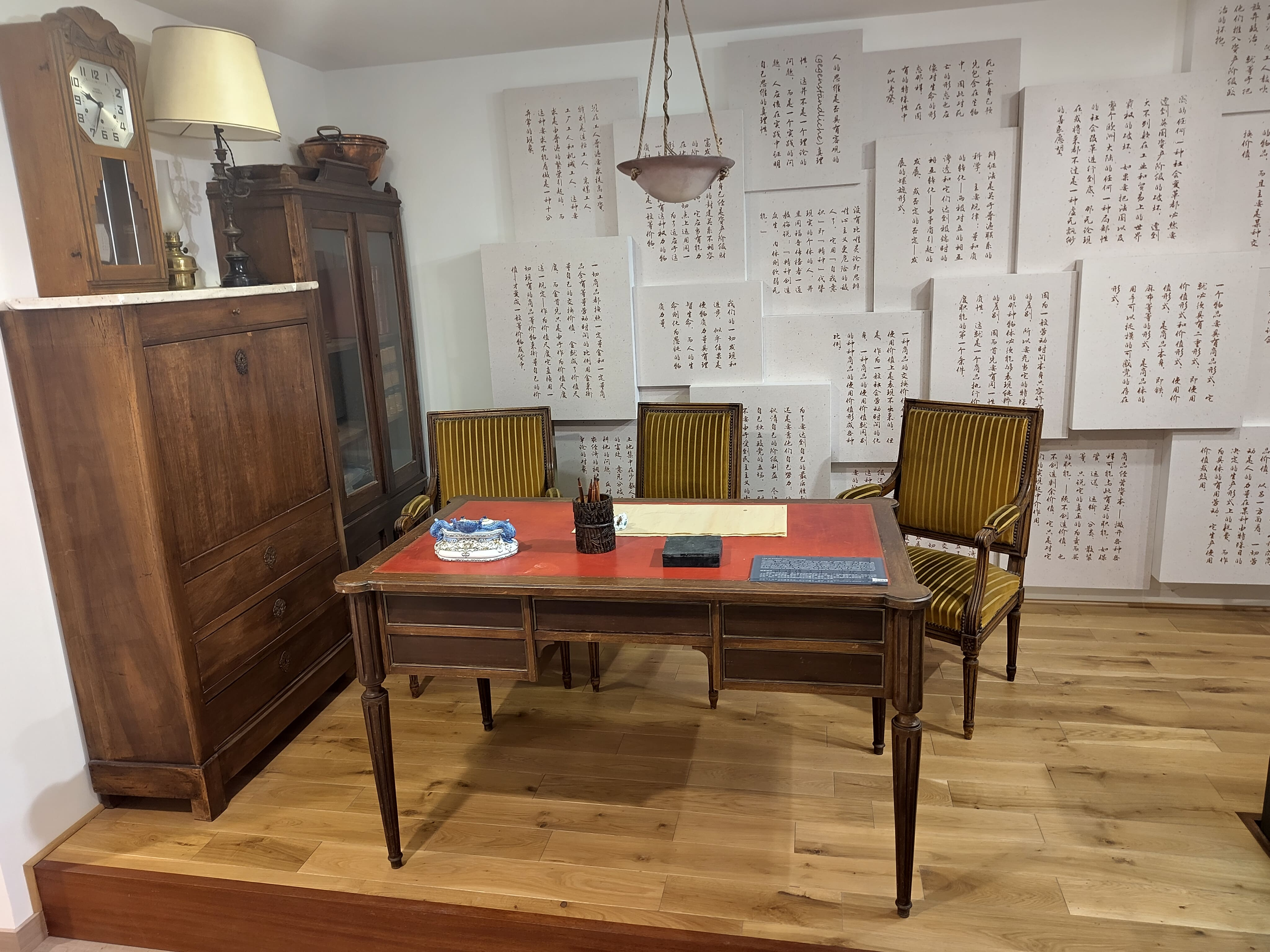
- A reproduction of a study space in the Historical Museum of French-Chinese Friendship

Chinese name
- Traditional Chinese: 留法勤工儉學運動
- Simplified Chinese: 留法勤工俭学运动
Transcriptions
Standard Mandarin
- Hanyu Pinyin: Liú Fǎ qíngōng jiǎnxué yùndòng
- Wade–Giles: Liu Fa ch'in-kung Chien-hsüeh yün tung

French name
- French: Mouvement Travail-Études

The Diligent Work–Frugal Study Movement, often referred to as the Work–Study Movement (simplified Chinese: 留法勤工俭学运动; traditional Chinese: 留法勤工儉學運動; pinyin: Liú Fǎ qíngōng jiǎnxué yùndòng; lit. 'Work-study movement in France'; French: Mouvement Travail-Études), was a series of work-study programs which brought Chinese students to France and Belgium to work in factories as a way to pay for their study of French culture and Western science. The programs aimed to train Chinese radicals between the ages of 16 and 30 through first hand experience in a workers' movement. The programs were organized between 1912 and 1927 largely by a group of Chinese anarchists who had come to Paris and wanted to introduce French science and social idealism to China.

After organizing smaller-scale programs starting in 1908, in 1916, after the outbreak of First World War, the Chinese organizers worked with the Chinese and French governments to establish the Diligent Work–Frugal Study program, which brought less educated Chinese workers, and continued to bring students after the 1919 end of the war. In all, several thousand Chinese came to France as student-workers, though not all as formal members of a program. They included future leaders of the Chinese Communist Party such as Zhou Enlai and Deng Xiaoping, as well as others who went on to prominent roles in China.

The movement is commemorated in a small museum, the Historical Museum of French-Chinese Friendship, in the town of Montargis where many of the participant students resided.

== Origins ==
Well before Marxist socialism entered China, Chinese anarchists took up the cause of labor and educating the working class. The leaders of the Chinese Anarchist movement in Paris—Li Shizeng, Wu Zhihui, Zhang Renjie. Wang Jingwei, Wu Yuzhang, and Cai Yuanpei—supported Sun Yat-sen but urged him to add a social and cultural aspect to his program of political revolution. They argued that individuals could not liberate themselves, but that educated men had the responsibility as teachers to use moral education and personal rectitude to show others the way. At the time, most students who went abroad went on government scholarships to Japan, though the Chinese Educational Mission of 1872–1881 and the Boxer Indemnity Scholarship Program sent students to the United States. The Paris anarchists were eager to establish interchange with France, which they regarded as a progressive and secular society.

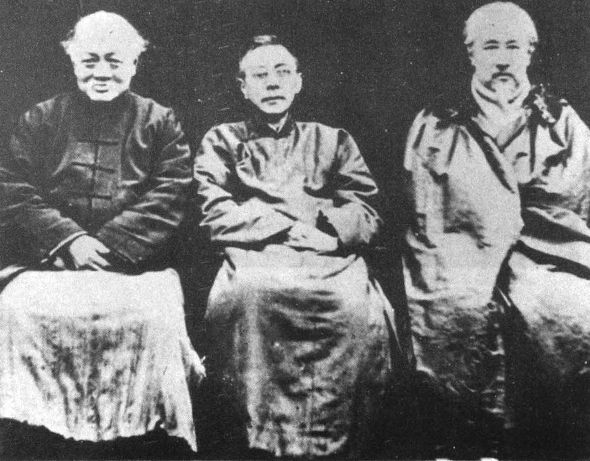
Wu Zhihui, Zhang Renjie, and Li Shizeng

In 1908 Li Shizeng planned the first Work-Study program as a way to bring young Chinese to France. He opened the Usine de la Caséo-Sojaïne, which manufactured soy products for the French market. The workers' study would be financed by working in his factory and their character would be uplifted by his regimen of moral instruction. This first Work-Study program eventually brought 120 workers to France. Li aimed to take these worker-students, who he called "ignorant" and "superstitious," and make them into knowledgeable and moral citizens who on their return home would become models for a new China. They received instruction in Chinese, French, and science and were required to abstain from tobacco, alcohol, and gambling.

In April 1912, excited by the success of the 1911 Revolution and the prospect of the new-born Republic of China, Li, Zhang Renjie, Wu Zhihui, and Cai Yuanpei, who had returned to Beijing, founded the Association for Frugal Study in France (traditional Chinese: 留法儉學會; simplified Chinese: 留法俭学会; pinyin: Liú Fǎ jiǎnxué huì), also known as the Society for Rational French Education (Societé Rationelle des Etudiants Chinois en France). Students traveled from China via the Siberian railway, a trip which took about eighteen days and cost approximately two hundred dollars. The Society prepared students for inexpensive study (¥600 a year) in France and "by labor and a simple life to cultivate habits of diligence and hard work." In contrast to his own experience when he came in 1902 as an "embassy scholar," which involved only a handful of students from privileged families, Li hoped to welcome hundreds of working-class students into the program. Wu Zhihui, who came from a poor family himself, remarked that actually the program would be especially good for students from rich families: "even if they do not study anything, if at least they learn how to clean toilets it will be worth it."

The Association opened a preparatory school in Beijing which offered aspiring students a six-month course in French. When the first group of 30 student-workers for his factory reached France in January 1913, Li arranged for them to be admitted to the college at Montargis, south of Paris, where his warm relations with city officials made arrangements easier. The Association established a workers' school near the factory, in which Li and Wu taught the Chinese and French languages, and general scientific knowledge. In addition to making workers more knowledgeable, work-study would eliminate their "decadent habits" and transform them into morally upright and hard-working citizens. A strict regimen was imposed—no smoking, gambling or alcohol—and the workers were expected to devote their spare time to study. In all, this program brought more than 120 students to France before it was closed down in 1913 by Yuan Shikai, the new president of China, who regarded its leaders as associates of his rival, Sun Yat-sen.

== The Diligent Work–Frugal Study program ==
The outbreak of war in 1914 led France to recruit Chinese workers for factory work and heavy manual labor. The Chinese Labor Corps in France eventually brought more than 130,000 workers, mostly from North China villages. In June 1915, Li and his Paris friends took this opportunity to provide schooling and training. The Work-Study program was renewed, though on a different basis, bringing less educated workers rather than students. By March 1916 their Paris group, the Société Franco-Chinoise d'Education (traditional Chinese: 華法敎育會; simplified Chinese: 华法教育会; pinyin: Huáfǎ jiàoyùhuì) was directly involved in recruiting and training these workers. The Société had well-placed French backers, mostly on the political left, including Alphonse Aulard, the first president of the Société, a professor of French history at the Sorbonne; Marius Moutet, vice-president and a socialist member of the National Assembly from Lyon; and Édouard Herriot, mayor of Lyon. They pressed the French government to give the Chinese workers technical education as well as factory work. Li wrote extensive articles in the Chinese Labor Journal (Huagong zazhi), which introduced readers to Western science, arts, fiction, and current events.

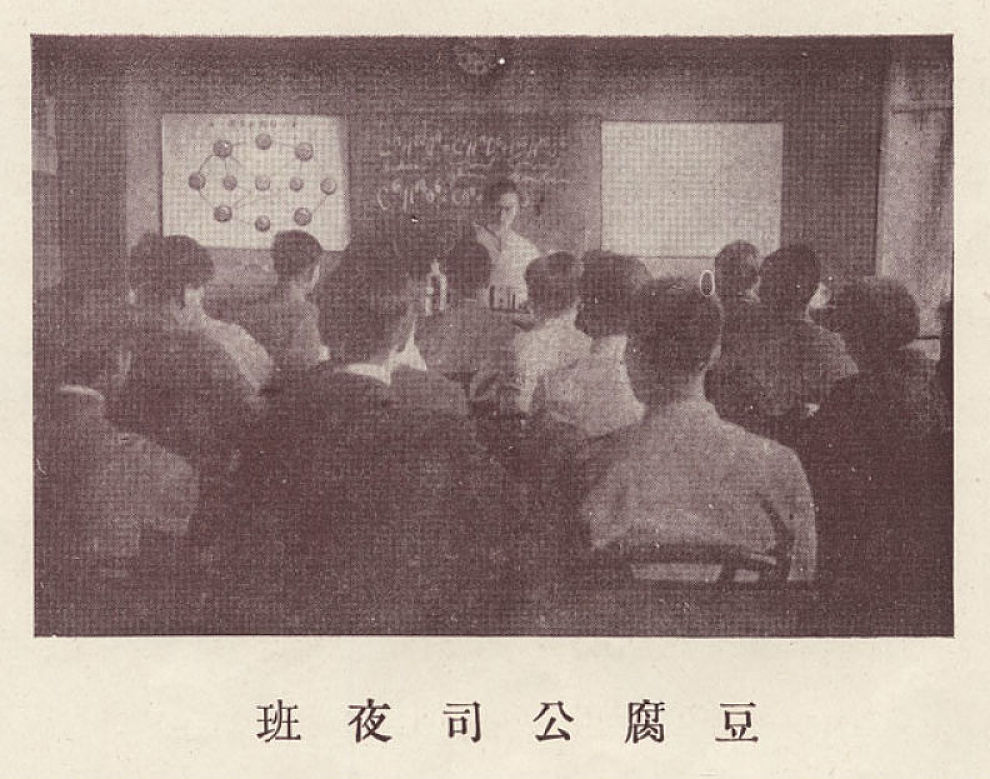
Doufu Factory Nightschool, 1916

By 1917, the Society had established feeder schools in Beijing, Baoding, and Changxingdian, in North China. Students in Hunan wanted to found a preparatory school, but the provincial government at Changsha refused to help. A delegation went to Beijing in February 1918 to consult with Li and Cai. The financial support they obtained from the Beijing government attracted even more students from Hunan, including Mao Zedong. While Mao raised funds for the movement, he did not himself study abroad pursuant to it. Cai and Li told student leaders that the government had little money but would lend them transportation funds, in return, students would be expected to teach laborers in France. The first group of thirty students to go to France repaid the loan within five months, allowing two groups a year to follow.

The new students came from a wide background. The Work-Study movement now offered overseas study to those whose education stopped at the middle-school level or below. The preparatory schools at Baoding and Changxingdian required only that applicants have basic Chinese and that they not possess "bad habits" such as smoking or gambling. The low tuition fees charged by the preparatory schools and the specially reduced boat fares Li Shizeng negotiated with French authorities also increased the numbers of students who could come on the program.

In 1919 and 1920, even after the signing of the peace, the Sino-French Education Association sponsored 17 groups of Chinese students, totaling nearly 1,600, who were placed in factories and schools, including increased numbers of students from the poorer inland provinces of Hunan and Sichuan. Among these were the future leader of the Chinese Communist Party, Deng Xiaoping, then 16 years old, who had been recruited by Wu Yuzhang in Chongqing, and Xu Teli, then in his early 40s, the future commissar of education at Yan'an in 1937.

Deng arrived in France on October 19, 1920, but within three months the Sichuan Association which sponsored his trip ran out of money. Deng then worked at Schneider & Co., France's largest ordnance manufacturer, in Creusot, a southern city. Deng was surprised to see white people treat Chinese like slaves in Shanghai and other ports along the way. Although he and many of his Chinese colleagues had considered themselves economically well off in China, they now worked long hours in poor conditions while they saw French families living in luxury unknown in China. Deng learned how to use an industrial welder, a skill which proved useful when he was deposed from power during the Cultural Revolution and sent to work in a factory.

== The Lyon incident and the decline of the program ==
In 1921, word spread that Wu Zhihui was bringing one-hundred students from Guangdong and Guangxi provinces who were to be given first preference in enrolling at the Institute in Lyon. Worker-students already in France, unhappy with their miserable conditions and fearful that their stipends were about to be cut off, went to Lyon to protest. The protests escalated into riots which led to the expulsion of their leaders from France. The "Lyon Incident" turned the younger generation of students into angry critics who dismissed anarchism as a revolutionary doctrine and rejected older leaders such as Wu, Li, and Cai Yuanpei. The Institute survived but did not play the hoped for central role in Sino-French relations.

== Assessment and impact ==
The student-workers did not all learn the lessons in French civilization that the organizers hoped. One student, Wang Ruofei, a future Chinese communist leader, sounded satisfied when he wrote

Our laboring spirit convinced us and we felt that these clouds of black smoke were also important products of culture and that these rough and ready laborers were, after all, leading the true way of life and were the builders of civilization. Why should I reject such a way of life?

However, Chen Yi, who later became a high ranking communist general, worked at a Michelin plant and complained that factory life had nothing to do with the ideals of equality, freedom and fraternity supposedly characteristic of French society. Rather, it had shown him the "evil nature" of European capitalism at first hand.

Among the radical students who came to France in 1919 were Cai Hesen, Chen Yi, Li Fuchun, and Cai Chang, all friends of Mao Zedong from Hunan province. Mao himself remained in China. Cai Hesen wrote to Mao in August and September 1920 to share his experiences and expound on the concept of the dictatorship of the proletariat which he learned in France. He urged Mao to prepare for an "October 1917 style" revolution in China. A centralized vanguard party which would usher in a proletarian dictatorship was essential, Cai insisted, in order to combat anarchism on the one hand and bourgeois dictatorship on the other. France would not be China's ally and model, he concluded, but the Soviet Union.

Student-workers in France who went on to leadership roles in the Chinese Communist Party included Zhou Enlai, Deng Xiaoping, Cai Hesen, Chen Yi, Li Fuchun, Li Lisan, Li Weihan, Nie Rongzhen, Wang Ruofei, Xiang Jingyu, Xu Deheng, Xu Teli, Zhao Shiyan, and Zhu De. Participants in the program or those who worked with them who went on to prominent roles in other areas included Li Huang, founder of the Chinese Youth Party, and Zhu Xi, a biologist who would be an outspoken opponent of the Eliminate Sparrows campaign.

Program students were overwhelmingly male, though there were perhaps forty women. Those who went on to become prominent communists include Zhang Yibao, Cai Chang, and Xiang Jingyu. Others include Zheng Yuxiu (better known in France as Tcheng Yu-hiu or Soumé Tcheng), who took a degree in law at the Sorbonne, married the diplomat Wei Daoming, and became an influential jurist and supporter of the Chinese Nationalist Party.

== Historical Museum of French-Chinese Friendship ==
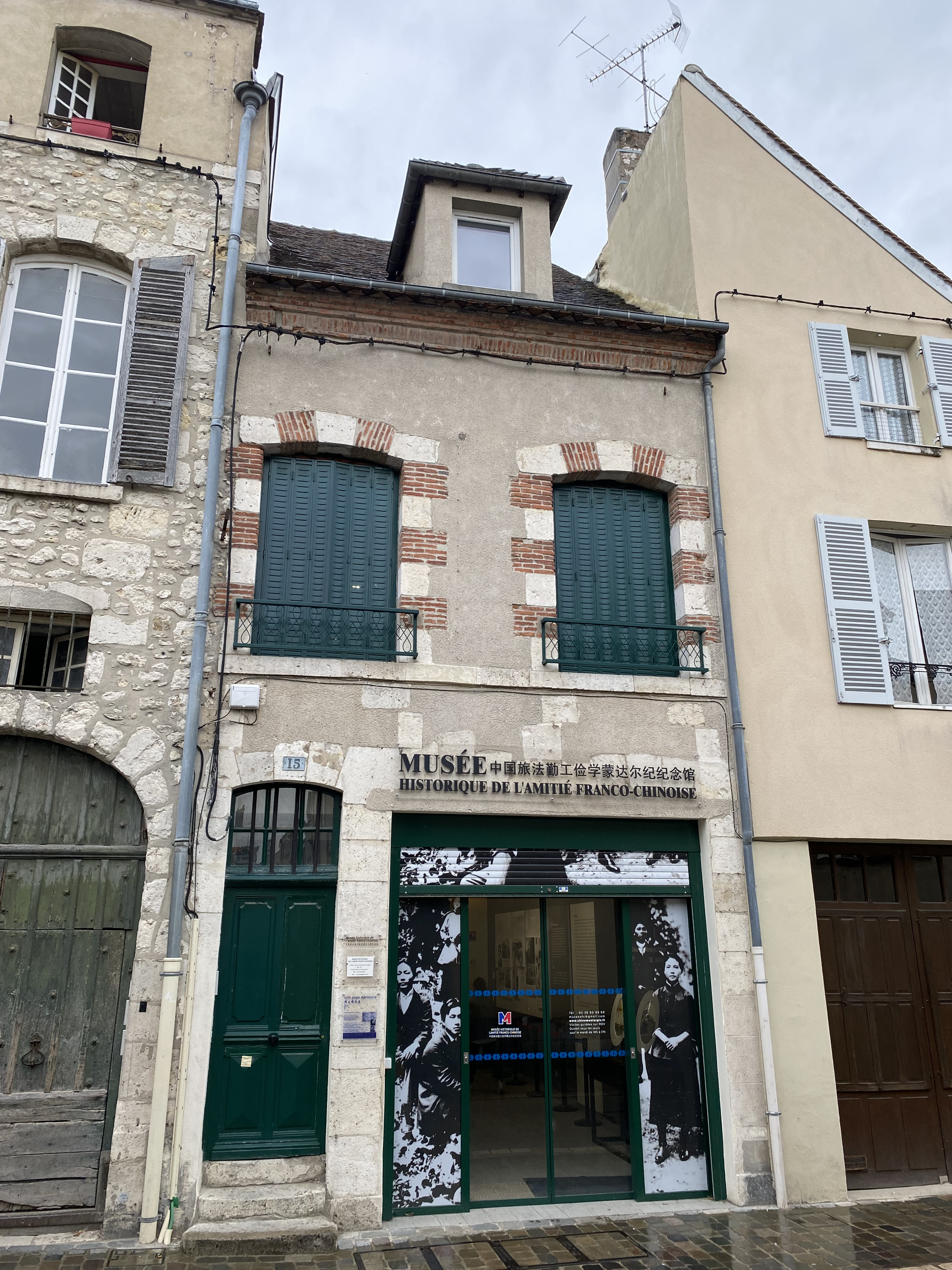
Street view of the museum

The Historical Museum of French-Chinese Friendship (French: musée historique de l'Amitié franco-chinoise; Chinese: 中国旅法勤工俭学蒙达尔纪纪念馆, lit. 'Montargis Museum of China's Work-Study Program in France') was created by the government of the province of Hunan in China, which purchased the building in central Montargis in June 2015 and had the museum inaugurated on 27 August 2016. The museum mainly celebrates the Diligent Work–Frugal Study Movement, of which more than 300 participants came to Montargis.

The museum occupies the three main floors of a house in which several Chinese students resided in the era of the Work-Study Movement, on 15 rue Raymond Tellier in the historical center of Montargis. It chronicles the Chinese presence in Montargis in the 1910s and 1920s, starting from a seminal meeting on 16 November 1912 when educator Li Shizeng first persuaded the town's municipal council to promote visits by Chinese students.

A section is also dedicated to China–France relations since the diplomatic recognition of the People's Republic of China by Charles de Gaulle in 1964.

== See also ==
- Zhu De

== References and further reading ==
- Bailey, Paul (1988). "The Chinese Work–Study Movement in France". China Quarterly. 115 (115): 441–461. doi:10.1017/S030574100002751X. S2CID 154375449.
- —— (2011). "The Sino-French Connection and World War One" (PDF). Journal of the British Association for Chinese Studies. 1: 1–16.
- —— (2014), "Cultural Productions in a New Global Space: Li Shizeng and the New Chinese Francophile Project in The Early Twentieth Century", in Lin, Peiyin; et al. (eds.), Print, Profit, and Perception: Ideas, Information and Knowledge in Chinese Societies, 1895–1949, Leiden: Brill, pp. 17–39, ISBN 978-9004259119
- Barman, Geneviève; Dulioust, Nicole (1987). "Un Groupe Oublié : Les Étudiantes ouvrières Chinoises En France" (PDF). Études Chinoises. 6 (2): 9–45. doi:10.3406/etchi.1987.1067. Archived from the original (PDF) on 2015-08-24.
- Boorman, Howard L., ed. (1968). "Li Shih-tseng". Biographical Dictionary of Republican China Volume II. New York: Columbia University Press. pp. 319–321.
- Dulioust, Nicole; Barman, Geneviève (1988). "Les Années Françaises de Deng Xiaoping". Vingtième Siècle. Revue d'Histoire. 20: 17–34. doi:10.3406/xxs.1988.2793.
- Yan, He (2014) [1968]. "Overseas Chinese in France and the New World Society: Culture, Business, State, and Transnational Connections, 1906–1949". In Leutner, Mechthild; Goikhman, Izabella (eds.). State, Society and Governance in Republican China. Münster: LIT Verlag Münster. pp. 49–63. ISBN 978-3-643-90471-3.
- Levine, Marilyn Avra (1993). The Found Generation: Chinese Communists in Europe During the Twenties. Seattle: University of Washington Press. ISBN 978-0295972404.
- Scalapino, Robert A.; Yu, George T. (1961). The Chinese Anarchist Movement. Berkeley: Center for Chinese Studies, Institute of International Studies, University of California.
- Vogel, Ezra F. (2011). Deng Xiaoping and the Transformation of China. Cambridge, Mass.: Belknap Press of Harvard University Press. ISBN 9780674055445.
- Xu, Guoqi (2011). Strangers on the Western Front: Chinese Workers in the Great War. Cambridge, Mass.: Harvard University Press. ISBN 9780674049994.
