= Bibliography of the Great Leap Forward and the Great Chinese Famine =

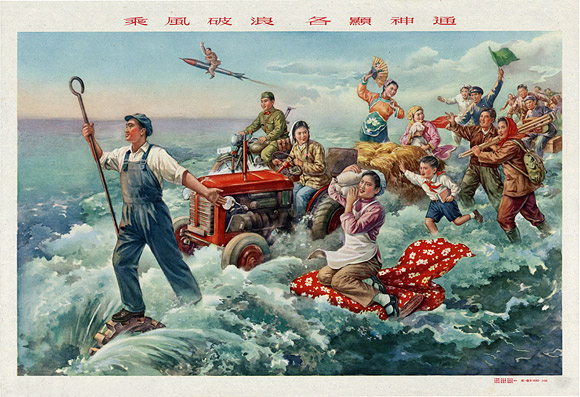
- Subject: Great Leap Forward; Great Chinese Famine
- Scope: Books, journal articles, primary sources
- Period covered: 1958 – 1965
- Languages: English
- Related: Bibliography of Chinese history; Bibliography of the Cold War

Bibliography of the Great Leap Forward and the Great Chinese Famine is a list of English-language books and scholarly articles on the history of the People's Republic of China from 1958 to 1965.

This bibliography contains academic-level English-language books (including translations) and journal articles, published mainly after World War II. (Note: Works published before World War II should be limited to areas where there are no significant post–World War II books on the subject, or where the work in question has significant historical merit.) Book entries may have references to reviews published in academic journals or major newspapers when these could be considered helpful. These reference reviews also function as a resource to find other works on this subject.

Works listed here are cited in the notes or bibliographies of scholarly sources. Each is published by an academic or major trade press, written by a recognized expert, or substantially reviewed in scholarly journals; borderline cases are omitted. A selection of primary sources is included. Many of the books below carry their own bibliographies; see Further reading section for longer ones, and External links section for historical sites and museums.

Citations follow APA style. (Note: Entries are in plain text APA 7 format without templates; templates are used only for reviews and notes.) Books have citations to academic journal or mainstream published reviews when available. For books only partly about the subject, relevant chapter or section titles are given where useful and available. Translators of the original-language edition are included when possible. In cases where a title or name has appeared with more than one English spelling, the most recent published form is used and a footnote documents any earlier title under which the work appeared.

== General surveys ==
- Becker, J. (1996). Hungry ghosts: Mao's secret famine. Free Press.
- Dikötter, F. (2010). Mao's great famine: The history of China's most devastating catastrophe, 1958–1962. Bloomsbury.
- Gao, M. (2018). Clashing Views of the Great Leap Forward. In Constructing China: Clashing Views of the People's Republic (pp. 158-192). Pluto Press.
- Manning, K. E., & Wemheuer, F. (Eds.). (2011). Eating bitterness: New perspectives on China's Great Leap Forward and famine. UBC Press.
- Riskin, C. (1987). China's political economy: The quest for development since 1949. Oxford University Press.
- Wemheuer, F. (2014). Famine politics in Maoist China and the Soviet Union. Yale University Press.
- Yang, J. (2012). Tombstone: The great Chinese famine, 1958–1962 (E. Friedman, J. Guo, & S. Mosher, Eds.; S. Mosher & J. Guo, Trans.). Farrar, Straus and Giroux. (Original work published 2008)
- Zhou, X. (2013). Forgotten voices of Mao's great famine, 1958–1962: An oral history. Yale University Press.
- Zhou, X. (Ed.). (2012). The great famine in China, 1958–1962: A documentary history. Yale University Press.

== Political history ==
- Bachman, D. (1991). Bureaucracy, economy, and leadership in China: The institutional origins of the Great Leap Forward. Cambridge University Press.
- Chan, A. L. (1992). The campaign for agricultural development in the Great Leap Forward: A study of policy-making and implementation in Liaoning. The China Quarterly, 129, 52–71. doi:10.1017/s0305741000041229
- Chan, A. L. (2001). Mao's crusade: Politics and policy implementation in China's Great Leap Forward. Oxford University Press.
- Chang, P. H. (1975). Power and policy in China. Pennsylvania State University Press.
- Domenach, J.-L. (1995). The origins of the Great Leap Forward: The case of one Chinese province (A. M. Berrett, Trans.). Westview Press. (Original work published 1982)
- Domes, J. (1985). Peng Te-huai: The man and the image. Stanford University Press.
- Joffe, E. (1965). Party and army: Professionalism and political control in the Chinese officer corps, 1949–1964. East Asian Research Center, Harvard University.
- Joseph, W. A. (1984). The critique of ultra-leftism in China, 1958–1981. Stanford University Press.
- Joseph, W. A. (1986). A tragedy of good intentions. Modern China, 12(4), 419–457. doi:10.1177/009770048601200401
- Li, C.-M. (1962). The statistical system of Communist China. University of California Press.
- MacFarquhar, R. (1983). The origins of the Cultural Revolution: Vol. 2. The Great Leap Forward, 1958–1960. Columbia University Press.
- Teiwes, F. C. (1986). Peng Dehuai and Mao Zedong. The Australian Journal of Chinese Affairs, 16, 81–98. JSTOR 2158776
- Teiwes, F. C., & Sun, W. (1999). China's road to disaster: Mao, central politicians, and provincial leaders in the unfolding of the Great Leap Forward, 1955–1959. M. E. Sharpe.

== Social and cultural history ==
- Andrews, J. F. (1994). Painters and politics in the People's Republic of China, 1949–1979. University of California Press.
- Chen, S. H. (1960). Multiplicity in uniformity: Poetry and the Great Leap Forward. The China Quarterly, 3, 1–15. doi:10.1017/s0305741000026205
- King, R. (2013). Milestones on a golden road: Writing for Chinese socialism, 1945–80. UBC Press.
- Kwong, J. (1979). The educational experiment of the Great Leap Forward, 1958–1959: Its inherent contradictions. Comparative Education Review, 23(3), 443–455. doi:10.1086/446072
- Lampton, D. M. (1974). Health policy during the Great Leap Forward. The China Quarterly, 60, 668–698. doi:10.1017/s0305741000025716
- Schmalzer, S. (2008). The people's Peking Man: Popular science and human identity in twentieth-century China. University of Chicago Press.

=== Agriculture ===
- Ash, R. (2006). Squeezing the peasants: Grain extraction, food consumption and rural living standards in Mao's China. The China Quarterly, 188, 959–998. doi:10.1017/s0305741006000518
- Chang, G. H., & Wen, G. J. (1997). Communal dining and the Chinese famine of 1958–1961. Economic Development and Cultural Change, 46(1), 1–34. doi:10.1086/452319
- Chao, K. (1970). Agricultural production in Communist China, 1949–1965. University of Wisconsin Press.
- Chen, Y. (2009). Cold War competition and food production in China, 1957–1962. Agricultural History, 83(1), 51–78. doi:10.1215/00021482-83.1.51
- Chen, Y. (2024). When food became scarce: How Chinese peasants survived the Great Leap Forward famine. Cornell University Press.
- Endicott, S. L. (1988). Red earth: Revolution in a Sichuan village. I. B. Tauris.
- Eyferth, J. (2009). Eating rice from bamboo roots: The social history of a community of handicraft papermakers in rural Sichuan, 1920–2000. Harvard University Asia Center.
- Gao, M. C. F. (1999). Gao Village: A portrait of rural life in modern China. University of Hawai'i Press.
- Kueh, Y. Y. (1995). Agricultural instability in China, 1931–1991: Weather, technology, and institutions. Clarendon Press.
- Lardy, N. R. (1983). Agriculture in China's modern economic development. Cambridge University Press.
- Ruf, G. A. (1998). Cadres and kin: Making a socialist village in West China, 1921–1991. Stanford University Press.
- Seybolt, P. J. (1996). Throwing the emperor from his horse: Portrait of a village leader in China, 1923–1995. Westview Press.
- Shapiro, J. (2001). Mao's war against nature: Politics and the environment in revolutionary China. Cambridge University Press.
- Thaxton, R. A., Jr. (2008). Catastrophe and contention in rural China: Mao's Great Leap Forward famine and the origins of righteous resistance in Da Fo Village. Cambridge University Press.
- Walker, K. R. (1965). Planning in Chinese agriculture: Socialisation and the private sector, 1956–1962. Frank Cass.
- Walker, K. R. (1984). Food grain procurement and consumption in China. Cambridge University Press.

=== Famine ===
- Ashton, B., Hill, K., Piazza, A., & Zeitz, R. (1984). Famine in China, 1958–61. Population and Development Review, 10(4), 613. JSTOR 1973284
- Bai, Y., & Kung, J. K. (2014). The shaping of an institutional choice: Weather shocks, the Great Leap famine, and agricultural decollectivization in China. Explorations in Economic History, 54, 1–26. doi:10.1016/j.eeh.2014.06.001
- Banister, J. (1987). China's changing population. Stanford University Press.
- Bernstein, T. P. (1984). Stalinism, famine, and Chinese peasants. Theory and Society, 13(3). doi:10.1007/bf00213230
- Bernstein, T. P. (2006). Mao Zedong and the famine of 1959–1960: A study in wilfulness. The China Quarterly, 186, 421–445. doi:10.1017/s0305741006000221
- Bianco, L. (2016). Comparing the Soviet and Chinese famines: Their perpetrators, actors, and victims. East/West: Journal of Ukrainian Studies, 3(2), 51–74. doi:10.21226/T22P4C
- Bramall, C. (2011). Agency and famine in China's Sichuan province, 1958–1962. The China Quarterly, 208, 990–1008. doi:10.1017/s030574101100110x
- Cai, Y., & Wang, F. (2005). Famine, social disruption, and involuntary fetal loss: Evidence from Chinese survey data. Demography, 42(2), 301–322. doi:10.1353/dem.2005.0010
- Chang, G. H., & Wen, G. J. (1997). Communal dining and the Chinese famine of 1958–1961. Economic Development and Cultural Change, 46(1), 1–34. JSTOR 10.1086/452319
- Chen, Y., & Zhou, L.-A. (2007). The long-term health and economic consequences of the 1959–1961 famine in China. Journal of Health Economics, 26(4), 659–681. doi:10.1016/j.jhealeco.2006.12.006
- Coale, A. J. (1984). Rapid population change in China, 1952–1982. National Academy Press.
- Frank, E. G., Wang, Q., Wang, S., Wang, X., & You, Y. (2025). Campaigning for extinction: Eradication of sparrows and the Great Famine in China (NBER Working Paper No. 34087). National Bureau of Economic Research. doi:10.3386/w34087
- Garnaut, A. (2013). The geography of the Great Leap famine. Modern China, 40(3), 315–348. doi:10.1177/0097700413507425
- Gooch, E. (2019). Terrain ruggedness and limits of political repression: Evidence from China's Great Leap Forward and famine (1959–61). Journal of Comparative Economics, 47(4), 827–852. doi:10.1016/j.jce.2019.08.001
- Harrell, S. (2021). The four horsemen of the ecopocalypse: The agricultural ecology of the Great Leap Forward. Human Ecology, 49(1), 7–18. doi:10.1007/s10745-020-00179-9
- Houser, D., Sands, B., & Xiao, E. (2009). Three parts natural, seven parts man-made: Bayesian analysis of China's Great Leap Forward demographic disaster. Journal of Economic Behavior & Organization, 69(2), 148–159. doi:10.1016/j.jebo.2007.09.008
- Kane, P. (1988). Famine in China, 1959–61: Demographic and social implications. Macmillan.
- Kasahara, H., & Li, B. (2020). Grain exports and the causes of China's Great Famine, 1959–1961: County-level evidence. Journal of Development Economics, 146, 102513. doi:10.1016/j.jdeveco.2020.102513
- Kung, J. K., & Lin, J. Y. (2003). The causes of China's Great Leap famine, 1959–1961. Economic Development and Cultural Change, 52(1), 51–73. doi:10.1086/380584
- Kung, J. K., & Chen, S. (2011). The tragedy of the nomenklatura: Career incentives and political radicalism during China's Great Leap famine. American Political Science Review, 105(1), 27–45. doi:10.1017/s0003055410000626
- Li, W., & Yang, D. T. (2005). The Great Leap Forward: Anatomy of a central planning disaster. Journal of Political Economy, 113(4), 840–877. doi:10.1086/430804
- Lin, J. Y. (1990). Collectivization and China's agricultural crisis in 1959–1961. Journal of Political Economy, 98(6), 1228–1252. doi:10.1086/261732
- Lin, J. Y., & Yang, D. T. (1998). On the causes of China's agricultural crisis and the Great Leap famine. China Economic Review, 9(2), 125–140. doi:10.1016/s1043-951x(99)80010-8
- Lin, J. Y., & Yang, D. T. (2000). Food availability, entitlements and the Chinese famine of 1959–61. The Economic Journal, 110(460), 136–158. doi:10.1111/1468-0297.00494
- Liu, Y., Wen, J. G., & Wei, X. (2014). Communal dining system and the puzzle of the Great Leap famine. China Agricultural Economic Review, 6(4), 698–716. doi:10.1108/CAER-10-2013-0139
- Meng, X., Qian, N., & Yared, P. (2015). The institutional causes of China's Great Famine, 1959–1961. The Review of Economic Studies, 82(4), 1568–1611. doi:10.1093/restud/rdv016
- Ó Gráda, C. (2011). Great leap into famine: A review essay. Population and Development Review, 37(1), 191–202. JSTOR 23043270
- Peng, X. (1987). Demographic consequences of the Great Leap Forward in China's provinces. Population and Development Review, 13(4), 639. JSTOR 1973026
- Riskin, C. (1998). Seven questions about the Chinese famine of 1959–1961. China Economic Review, 9(2), 111–124. doi:10.1016/s1043-951x(99)80009-1
- Rothschild, V. (2026). State repression and selective expression: Communal canteens and the "collective" memory of China's Great Leap famine. The China Quarterly, 265, 146–164. doi:10.1017/S0305741025101720
- Smil, V. (1999). China's great famine: 40 years later. BMJ, 319(7225), 1619–1621. doi:10.1136/bmj.319.7225.1619
- Song, S. (2010). Mortality consequences of the 1959–1961 Great Leap Forward famine in China: Debilitation, selection, and mortality crossovers. Social Science & Medicine, 71(3), 551–558. doi:10.1016/j.socscimed.2010.04.034
- Steinfeld, J. (2018). China's deadly science lesson: How an ill-conceived campaign against sparrows contributed to one of the worst famines in history. Index on Censorship, 47(3), 49. doi:10.1177/0306422018800259
- Sun, J. (2016). Population Change during China’s “Three Years of Hardship” (1959 1961). Contemporary Chinese Political Economy and Strategic Relations: An International Journal, 2(1), 453-500.
- Thaxton, R. A., Jr. (2008). Catastrophe and contention in rural China: Mao's Great Leap Forward famine and the origins of righteous resistance in Da Fo village. Cambridge University Press. doi:10.1017/CBO9780511756085
- Wemheuer, F. (2014). Famine politics in Maoist China and the Soviet Union. Yale University Press. JSTOR j.ctt1bhknwh
- Worth, R. M. (1965). Health trends in China since the Great Leap Forward. The China Quarterly, 22, 181–189. doi:10.1017/s0305741000048785
- Yang, D. L., & Su, F. (1998). The politics of famine and reform in rural China. China Economic Review, 9(2), 141–155. doi:10.1016/s1043-951x(99)80011-x
- Yang, D. T. (2008). China's agricultural crisis and famine of 1959–1961: A survey and comparison to Soviet famines. Comparative Economic Studies, 50(1), 1–29. doi:10.1057/ces.2008.4
- Yao, S. (1999). A note on the causal factors of China's famine in 1959–1961. Journal of Political Economy, 107(6), 1365–1369. doi:10.1086/250100
- Zhou, X. (Ed.). (2012). The great famine in China, 1958–1962: A documentary history. Yale University Press. JSTOR j.ctt1nq1qr
- Zhou, X. (2013). Forgotten voices of Mao's great famine, 1958–1962: An oral history. Yale University Press.

=== Industry and urban life ===
- Brown, J. (2012). City versus countryside in Mao's China: Negotiating the divide. Cambridge University Press.
- Field, R. M. (1970). Industrial production in Communist China: 1957–1968. The China Quarterly, 42, 46–64. doi:10.1017/s0305741000049742
- Hou, L. (2018). Building for oil: Daqing and the formation of the Chinese socialist state. Harvard University Asia Center.
- Howe, C. (1973). Wage patterns and wage policy in modern China, 1919–1972. Cambridge University Press.
- Molyneux, K. (2026). A new urban hierarchy: The aftermath of the Great Leap Forward in Nanjing, 1961–1963. Modern China, 52(1), 33–59. doi:10.1177/00977004251366568
- Paltemaa, L. (2011). The Maoist urban state and crisis: Comparing disaster management in the Great Tianjin Flood in 1963 and the Great Leap Forward famine. The China Journal, 66, 25–51. doi:10.1086/tcj.66.41262806
- Riskin, C. (1971). Small industry and the Chinese model of development. The China Quarterly, 46, 245–273. doi:10.1017/s0305741000010687
- Salaff, J. (1967). The urban communes and anti-city experiment in Communist China. The China Quarterly, 29, 82–110. doi:10.1017/s0305741000047925

== International relations ==
- Chen, J. (1995). China's involvement in the Vietnam War, 1964–69. The China Quarterly, 142, 356–387. doi:10.1017/s0305741000034974
- Lewis, J. W., & Xue, L. (1988). China builds the bomb. Stanford University Press.

=== The Sino-Soviet split ===
- Floyd, D. (1964). Mao against Khrushchev: A short history of the Sino-Soviet conflict. Praeger.
- Friedman, J. (2015). Shadow Cold War: The Sino-Soviet competition for the Third World. University of North Carolina Press.
- Gittings, J. (1968). Survey of the Sino-Soviet dispute: A commentary and extracts from the recent polemics, 1963–1967. Oxford University Press.
- Griffith, W. E. (1964). The Sino-Soviet rift. MIT Press.
- Jersild, A. (2014). The Sino-Soviet alliance: An international history. University of North Carolina Press.
- Li, D., & Xia, Y. (2018). Mao and the Sino-Soviet split, 1959–1973: A new history. Lexington Books.
- Li, M. (2010). Ideological dilemma: Mao's China and the Sino-Soviet split, 1962–63. Cold War History, 11(3), 387–419. doi:10.1080/14682745.2010.498822
- Lüthi, L. M. (2008). The Sino-Soviet split: Cold War in the communist world. Princeton University Press.
- Radchenko, S. (2009). Two suns in the heavens: The Sino-Soviet struggle for supremacy, 1962–1967. Woodrow Wilson Center Press; Stanford University Press.
- Shen, Z., & Xia, Y. (2015). Mao and the Sino-Soviet partnership, 1945–1959: A new history. Lexington Books.
- Zagoria, D. S. (1962). The Sino-Soviet conflict, 1956–1961. Princeton University Press.
- Zhang, S. G. (2001). Economic Cold War: America's embargo against China and the Sino-Soviet alliance, 1949–1963. Woodrow Wilson Center Press; Stanford University Press.

=== Tibet ===
- Conboy, K., & Morrison, J. (2002). The CIA's secret war in Tibet. University Press of Kansas.
- Goldstein, M. C. (2019). A history of modern Tibet: Vol. 4. In the eye of the storm, 1957–1959. University of California Press.
- Knaus, J. K. (1999). Orphans of the Cold War: America and the Tibetan struggle for survival. PublicAffairs.
- Li, J. (2016). Tibet in agony: Lhasa 1959 (S. Wilf, Trans.). Harvard University Press.
- McGranahan, C. (2010). Arrested histories: Tibet, the CIA, and memories of a forgotten war. Duke University Press.
- Panchen Lama, 10th. (1997). A poisoned arrow: The secret report of the 10th Panchen Lama. Tibet Information Network.

=== Sino-Indian War ===
- Chervin, R. (2020). "Cartographic aggression": Media politics, propaganda, and the Sino-Indian border dispute. Journal of Cold War Studies, 22(3), 225–247. doi:10.1162/jcws_a_00911
- Garver, J. W. (2001). Protracted contest: Sino-Indian rivalry in the twentieth century. University of Washington Press.
- Hoffmann, S. A. (1990). India and the China crisis. University of California Press.
- Lintner, B. (2018). China's India war: Collision course on the roof of the world. Oxford University Press.
- Maxwell, N. (1970). India's China war. Jonathan Cape.
- Ou, B., & Zhao, X. (2023). The role of national identities in China's decision for war in the 1962 Sino-Indian border conflict. India Review, 22(4), 485–508. doi:10.1080/14736489.2023.2236467
- Raghavan, S. (2010). War and peace in modern India: A strategic history of the Nehru years. Palgrave Macmillan.
- Whiting, A. S. (1975). The Chinese calculus of deterrence: India and Indochina. University of Michigan Press.

== Aftermath ==
- Ahn, B.-j. (1976). Chinese politics and the Cultural Revolution: Dynamics of policy processes. University of Washington Press.
- Ansley, C. (1971). The heresy of Wu Han: His play "Hai Jui's dismissal" and its role in China's Cultural Revolution. University of Toronto Press.
- Bai, Y., & Kung, J. K. (2014). The shaping of an institutional choice: Weather shocks, the Great Leap famine, and agricultural decollectivization in China. Explorations in Economic History, 54, 1–26. doi:10.1016/j.eeh.2014.06.001
- Barnett, A. D. (1967). Cadres, bureaucracy, and political power in Communist China. Columbia University Press.
- Baum, R., & Teiwes, F. C. (1968). Ssu-ch'ing: The Socialist Education Movement of 1962–1966. Center for Chinese Studies, University of California.
- Baum, R. (1969). Revolution and reaction in the Chinese countryside: The Socialist Education Movement in Cultural Revolutionary perspective. The China Quarterly, 38, 92–119. doi:10.1017/s0305741000049158
- Baum, R. (1975). Prelude to revolution: Mao, the party, and the peasant question, 1962–66. Columbia University Press.
- Goldman, M. (1981). China's intellectuals: Advise and dissent. Harvard University Press.
- Lüthi, L. M. (2008). The Vietnam War and China's Third-Line defense planning before the Cultural Revolution, 1964–1966. Journal of Cold War Studies, 10(1), 26–51. doi:10.1162/jcws.2008.10.1.26
- MacFarquhar, R. (1997). The origins of the Cultural Revolution: Vol. 3. The coming of the cataclysm, 1961–1966. Columbia University Press.
- Meyskens, C. F. (2020). Mao's Third Front: The militarization of Cold War China. Cambridge University Press.
- Naughton, B. (1988). The Third Front: Defence industrialization in the Chinese interior. The China Quarterly, 115, 351–386. doi:10.1017/s030574100002748x
- Neuhauser, C. (1967). The Chinese Communist Party in the 1960s: Prelude to the Cultural Revolution. The China Quarterly, 32, 3–36. doi:10.1017/s0305741000047202
- Pusey, J. R. (1969). Wu Han: Attacking the present through the past. East Asian Research Center, Harvard University.
- Yang, D. L. (1996). Calamity and reform in China: State, rural society, and institutional change since the Great Leap famine. Stanford University Press.

== Historiography and memory studies ==
=== Historiography ===
- Dikötter, F. (2013). Response to "Hard facts and half-truths: The new archival history of China's Great Famine". China Information, 27(3), 371–378. doi:10.1177/0920203x13499856
- Garnaut, A. (2013). Hard facts and half-truths: The new archival history of China's Great Famine. China Information, 27(2), 223–246. doi:10.1177/0920203x13485390
- Ó Gráda, C. (2008). The ripple that drowns? Twentieth-century famines in China and India as economic history. The Economic History Review, 61(S1), 5–37. doi:10.1111/j.1468-0289.2008.00435.x
- Ó Gráda, C. (2011). Great leap into famine: A review essay. Population and Development Review, 37(1), 191–202. doi:10.1111/j.1728-4457.2011.00398.x
- Ó Gráda, C. (2013). Great Leap, great famine: A review essay. Population and Development Review, 39(2), 333–346. doi:10.1111/j.1728-4457.2013.00595.x
- Yang, J. (2010). The fatal politics of the PRC's Great Leap famine: The preface to Tombstone. Journal of Contemporary China, 19(66), 755–776. doi:10.1080/10670564.2010.485408

=== Memory studies ===
- Hsiung, P.-C., & Wang, Y. (2018). Unmasking China's Great Leap Forward and Great Famine (1958–1962) through shunkouliu. Qualitative Inquiry, 25(8), 811–821. doi:10.1177/1077800418809129
- Jing, J. (1996). The temple of memories: History, power, and morality in a Chinese village. Stanford University Press.
- Mueggler, E. (2001). The age of wild ghosts: Memory, violence, and place in southwest China. University of California Press.
- Veg, S. (2014). Testimony, history and ethics: From the memory of Jiabiangou Prison Camp to a reappraisal of the Anti-Rightist Movement in present-day China. The China Quarterly, 218, 514–539. doi:10.1017/s0305741014000368
- Weigelin-Schwiedrzik, S. (2003). Trauma and memory: The case of the Great Famine in the People's Republic of China (1959–1961). Historiography East and West, 1(1), 39–67. doi:10.1163/157018603763585249
- Wemheuer, F. (2009). Regime changes of memory: Creating the official history of the Ukrainian and Chinese famines under state socialism and after the Cold War. Kritika: Explorations in Russian and Eurasian History, 10(1), 31–59. doi:10.1353/kri.0.0077
- Wemheuer, F. (2010). Dealing with responsibility for the Great Leap famine in the People's Republic of China. The China Quarterly, 201, 176–194. doi:10.1017/s0305741009991123

== Primary sources ==
- Chen, C. S. (Ed.). (1969). Rural people's communes in Lien-chiang: Documents concerning communes in Lien-chiang County, Fukien Province, 1962–1963 (C. P. Ridley, Trans.). Hoover Institution Press.
- Cheng, J. C. (Ed.). (1966). The politics of the Chinese Red Army. Hoover Institution.
- Crook, I., & Crook, D. (1966). The first years of Yangyi Commune. Routledge & Kegan Paul.
- King, R. (Ed.). (2010). Heroes of China's Great Leap Forward: Two stories. University of Hawai'i Press.
- MacFarquhar, R., Cheek, T., & Wu, E. (Eds.). (1989). The secret speeches of Chairman Mao: From the Hundred Flowers to the Great Leap Forward. Council on East Asian Studies, Harvard University.
- Myrdal, J. (1965). Report from a Chinese village (M. Michael, Trans.). Pantheon Books. (Original work published 1963)
- Peng, D. (1984). Memoirs of a Chinese marshal: The autobiographical notes of Peng Dehuai (1898–1974) (S. Grimes, Ed.; L. Zheng, Trans.). Foreign Languages Press.
- Schram, S. R. (Ed.). (1974). Chairman Mao talks to the people: Talks and letters, 1956–1971 (J. Chinnery & Tieyun, Trans.). Pantheon Books.
- Yang, X. (2009). Woman from Shanghai: Tales of survival from a Chinese labor camp (W. Huang, Trans.). Pantheon Books.
- Zhou, X. (Ed.). (2012). The great famine in China, 1958–1962: A documentary history. Yale University Press.

== See also ==
- 1959 Tibetan uprising
- Backyard furnace
- Bibliography of Chinese history
- Bibliography of the Cold War
- Four Pests campaign
- Great Chinese Famine
- Great Leap Forward
- Liu Shaoqi
- Lushan Conference
- Peng Dehuai
- People's commune
- Seven Thousand Cadres Conference
- Sino-Indian War
- Sino-Soviet split
- Socialist Education Movement
