= Caséo-Sojaïne =

Factory in France

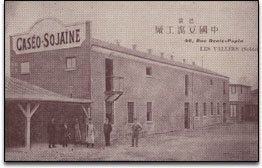
Factory for soy production in Paris, 1916

Caséo-Sojaïne was a factory founded in 1908 or 1909 in La Garenne-Colombes (in the banlieue of Paris) to process soy. It was founded by the Chinese agricultural economist and educator Li Shizeng. His goal was the industrial production of soy milk to sustainably feed poorer parts of the world (mainly his home country China). The workers consisted mainly of Chinese who took part in a program studying the Chinese and French language as well as natural sciences.

The Caséo-Sojaïne did pioneer work in exploiting soy, raised the oil and protein levels as well as crop stability.

The factory exemplified the principle of the Diligent Work-Frugal Study Movement, a study program that brought young Chinese to France. Besides its main purpose of efficient production of foods based on innovative application of chemical and agricultural research, it also focused on the rhythm of life of its students. The simple facility was governed by strict morals (amongst others alcohol, tobacco, gambling, and prostitution were forbidden) and the daily life of the students was divided into work and studying in their free time. This principle was meant to create a new type of person or elite. Focused entirely on their work and of unexceptionable honesty. Further it was supposed to develop social habits like courtesy, cooperation, and equality in each student.

== See also ==
- L’Institut FRANCO-CHINOIS de Lyon (1921–1946). bm-lyon.fr
