= Great Chinese Famine =

Famine killing millions (1959–1961)

Great Chinese Famine 三年大饥荒
- Country: China
- Location: Half of the country. Death rates were highest in Anhui (18% dead), Chongqing (15%), Sichuan (13%), Guizhou (11%), and Hunan (8%).
- Period: 1959–1961, famine deaths began in 1958 and persisted until 1962
- Total deaths: 3.5–55 million (Note: Most estimates fall between 15 and 46 million, and a figure of 30 million is widely accepted in China.)
- Causes: The Great Leap Forward; Over-procurement and inflexibility in procurement of grain; People's communes and poor agricultural practices; Planned economy inefficiencies; Political suppression, systemic misinformation, and state violence; Eliminate Sparrows campaign
- Consequences: Termination of the Great Leap Forward; Seven Thousand Cadres Conference; Mao Zedong temporarily sidelined in the CCP

The Great Chinese Famine (Chinese: 三年大饥荒; lit. 'three years of great famine') was a famine that occurred between 1959 and 1961 in the People's Republic of China (PRC). Some scholars have also included the years 1958 or 1962. It has been described as the deadliest famine and one of the greatest man-made disasters in human history. (Note: According to various sources.) The death toll is highly contested; estimates published since 1984 range from 3.5 million to 55 million excess deaths, though most fall between 15 and 46 million, with much research concentrating on changes in official population statistics. A figure of 30 million is widely accepted in China but has been questioned by some researchers. According to scholar Cao Shuji, the most stricken provinces were Anhui (18% dead), Chongqing (15%), Sichuan (13%), Guizhou (11%) and Hunan (8%).

The famine is generally attributed to policy failures of the Great Leap Forward and its people's communes, above all the over-procurement of grain and its misallocation, the diversion of rural labour to industry, and the exaggeration of harvests, compounded by adverse weather and by the suppression of reports of starvation.

During the Seven Thousand Cadres Conference in early 1962, Liu Shaoqi, then President of China, formally attributed 30% of the famine to natural disasters and 70% to man-made errors (三分天灾，七分人祸). After the launch of Reform and opening up, the Chinese Communist Party (CCP) officially stated in June 1981 that the famine was mainly due to the mistakes of the Great Leap Forward as well as the Anti-Right Deviation Struggle, in addition to some natural disasters and the Sino-Soviet split.

== Terminology ==
Aside from the "Three Years of Great Famine" (三年大饥荒), there are two names for the famine that have been used by the Chinese government. Initially, the usual name was "Three Years of Natural Disasters" (三年自然灾害). In June 1981, this was changed to "Three Years of Difficulty" (三年困难时期), thus no longer blaming nature alone for the famine.

== Causes of the famine ==
Scholars and authors have argued that the major contributing factors to the famine were a combination of radical agricultural policies, social pressure, economic mismanagement, and natural disasters such as droughts and floods in farming regions, and variously named the policies of the Great Leap Forward (1958 to 1962) and people's communes; inefficient food distribution within the nation's planned economy; over-procurement of grain by provincial and central government, with some writers naming foreign exports as a main factor; the use of poor agricultural techniques and poor irrigation projects; the Eliminate Sparrows campaign which significantly disrupted the Chinese ecosystem; over-reporting of food production and political suppression from the CCP; and the rapid transition of millions of farmers to industrial labor, iron production, and steel production as major causes.

The extent to which weather conditions caused the famine is disputed. Economist Chris Bramall notes that revisionist accounts describing weather conditions as close to normal during the famine years are based on poor methodology, taking average measurements across provinces; for example, western Sichuan experienced flooding while the east of the province suffered drought, cancelling each other out to reach a normal average. Meng, Qian and Yared noted that previous research had found weather to account for between 14% and 50% of the famine.

=== Great Leap Forward ===
The Chinese Communist Party introduced drastic changes in farming policy during the Great Leap Forward.

==== People's communes ====
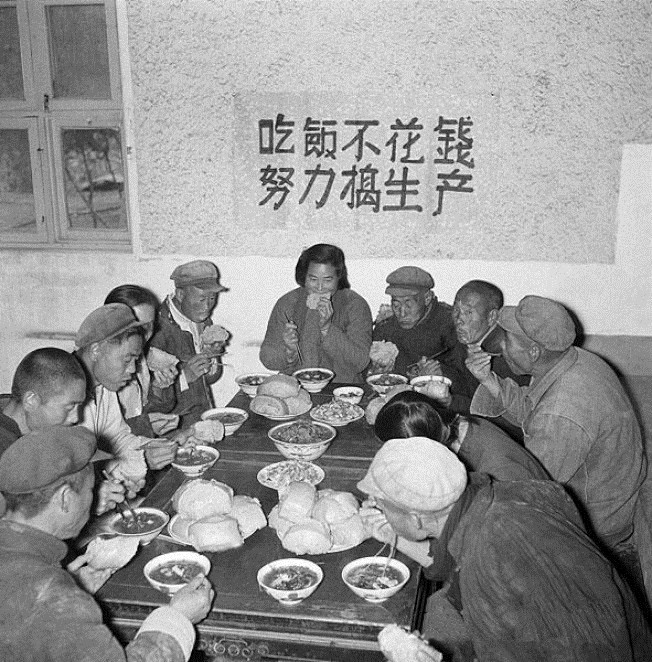
The public dining hall (canteen) of a people's commune. The slogan on the wall reads "Eating is free, strive to produce".

During the Great Leap Forward, farming was organized into people's communes and the cultivation of individual plots was forbidden. The people's commune system was first implemented by local authorities in Suiping County, Henan in April 1958. Tan Qilong mentioned the idea to Mao Zedong, who said it sounded good. This was then publicised by the People's Daily which popularised the policy in other areas. Previously farmers cultivated plots of land given to them by the government.

The Great Leap Forward led to the agricultural economy being increasingly centrally planned. Regional Party leaders were given production quotas for the communes under their control. Their output was then appropriated by the state and distributed at its discretion. Former deputy editor of Yanhuang Chunqiu and author Yang Jisheng summarized the effect of the production targets as an inability for supply to be redirected to where it was most demanded:

In Xinyang, people starved at the doors of the grain warehouses. As they died, they shouted, "Communist Party, Chairman Mao, save us". If the granaries of Henan and Hebei had been opened, no one need have died. As people were dying in large numbers around them, officials did not think to save them. Their only concern was how to fulfill the delivery of grain.

The degree to which people's communes lessened or worsened the famine is controversial. Each region dealt with the famine differently, and timelines of the famine are not uniform across China. One argument is that excessive eating took place in the mess halls, and that this directly led to a worsening of the famine. If excessive eating had not taken place, one scholar argued, "the worst of the Great Leap Famine could still have been avoided in mid-1959". However, dire hunger did not set in to places like Da Fo village until 1960, and the public dining hall participation rate was found not to be a meaningful cause of famine in Anhui and Jiangxi. In Da Fo village, "food output did not decline in reality, but there was an astonishing loss of food availability associated with Maoist state appropriation".

==== Agricultural techniques ====
Along with collectivization, the central government decreed several changes in agricultural techniques that would be based on the ideas of later-discredited Soviet agronomist Trofim Lysenko. One of these ideas was close planting, whereby the density of seedlings was at first tripled and then doubled again. The theory was that plants of the same species would not compete with each other. In natural cycles they did fully compete, which actually stunted growth and resulted in lower yields.

Another policy known as "deep plowing" was based on the ideas of Lysenko's colleague Terentiy Maltsev, who encouraged peasants across China to eschew normal plowing depths of 15–20 centimeters and instead plow deeply into the soil (1 to 2 Chinese feet or 33 to 66 cm). The deep plowing theory stated that the most fertile soil was deep in the earth, and plowing unusually deeply would allow extra-strong root growth. While deep plowing can increase yields in some contexts, the policy is generally considered to have hindered yields in China.

==== Eliminate Sparrows campaign ====
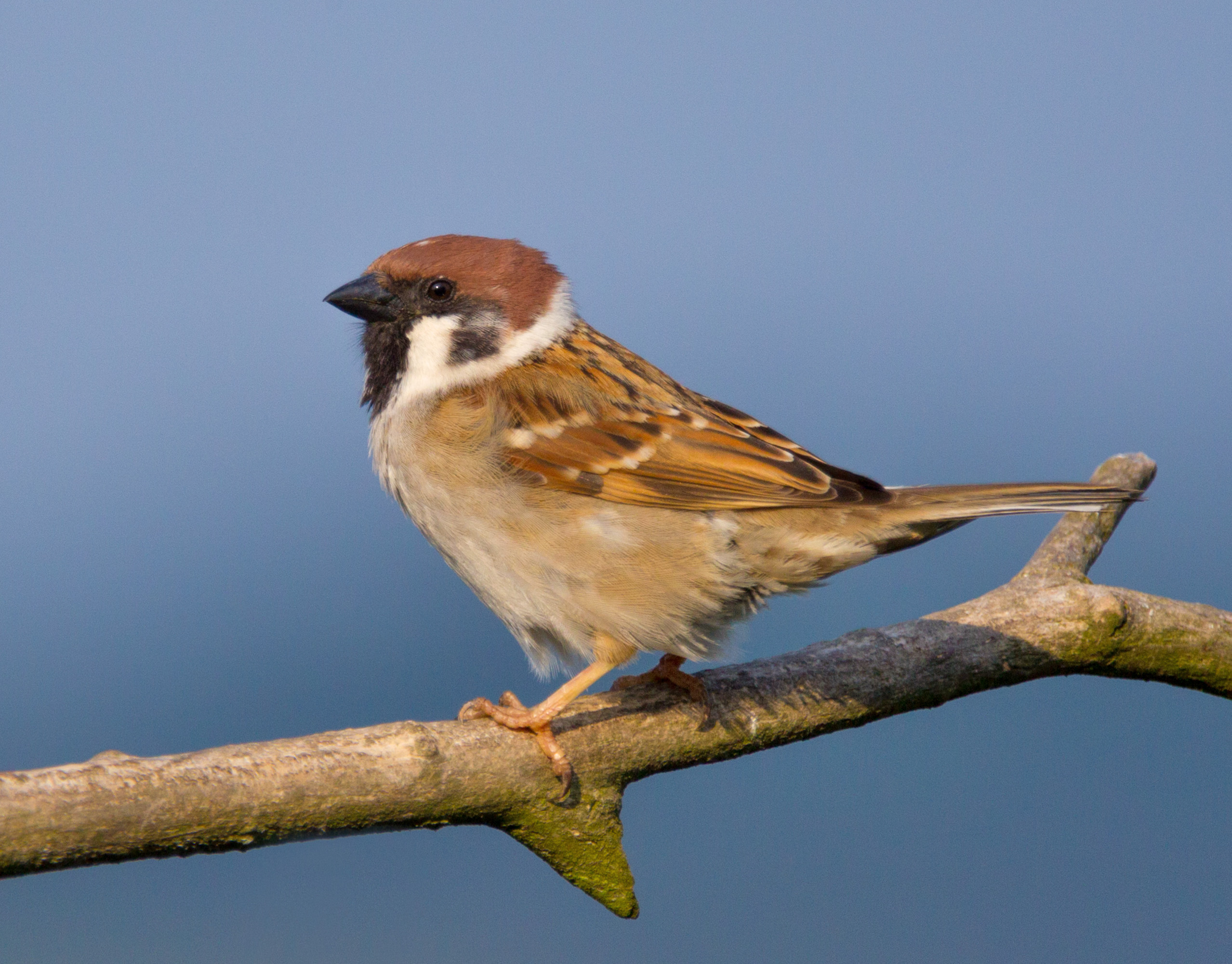
The Eurasian tree sparrow was targeted in the Eliminate Sparrows campaign

In the Four Pests campaign, citizens were called upon to destroy mosquitoes, rats, flies, and sparrows. The mass eradication of the sparrows as part of the associated Eliminate Sparrows campaign resulted in an increase of the population of crop-eating insects, which had no predators without the sparrows.

==== Illusion of superabundance ====
According to Thomas P. Bernstein, Chinese officials were already beginning to over-report grain production in 1957 due to pressure from above. In Sichuan Province, reported grain collections kept rising from 1958 to 1961 even as actual collections fell, and provincial grain production dropped from 17.89 million tonnes in 1958 to 12.66 million tonnes in 1959. In Gansu, grain production declined by 4,273,000 tonnes over the same period.

Inflated reporting created an "illusion of superabundance" (浮夸风), and the CCP believed that they had an excess of grain. On the contrary, the crop yields were lower than average. For instance, Beijing believed that "in 1960 state granaries would have 50 billion jin of grain", when they actually contained 12.7 billion jin. The effects of the illusion of superabundance were significant, leaving some historians to argue that it was the major cause of much of the starvation throughout China. Yang Dali argued that there were three main consequences from the illusion of superabundance:

First, it led to planners to shift lands from grain to economic crops, such as cotton, sugarcane, and beets, and divert huge numbers of agricultural laborers into industrial sectors, fueling state demand for procured grain from the countryside. Second, it prompted the Chinese leadership, especially Zhou Enlai, to speed up grain exports to secure more foreign currency to purchase capital goods needed for industrialization. Finally, the illusion of superabundance made the adoption of the commune mess halls seem rational at the time. All these changes, of course, contributed to the rapid exhaustion of grain supplies.

==== Iron and steel production ====
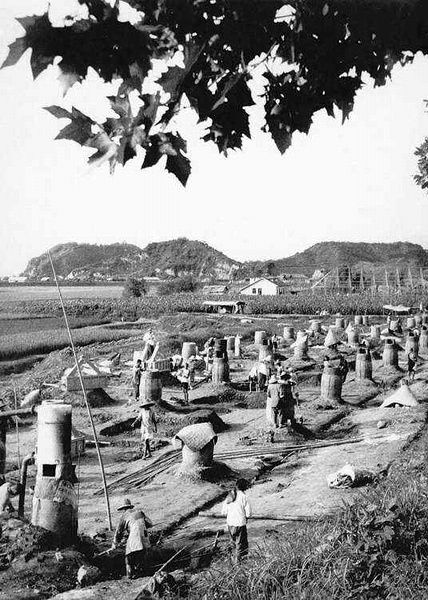
Backyard furnaces for producing steel

Iron and steel production was identified as a key requirement for economic advancement, and millions of peasants were ordered away from agricultural work to join the iron and steel production workforce. Much of the iron produced by the peasant population ended up being too weak to be used commercially, and agricultural laborers and production were lost.

=== Other policy issues ===
Economists Xin Meng, Nancy Qian and Pierre Yared showed that aggregate production remaining in rural areas after procurement was sufficient for avoiding famine and that the famine was caused by poor distribution of food, although the inflexibility in centrally planned procurement meant that areas which produced more food were left with less food than others. This explained why, unlike in most famines, areas which produced more food suffered more excess deaths. Economic historians James Kung and Shuo Chen show that there was more over-procurement in places where politicians faced more competition.

In addition, policies from the Chinese Communist Party (CCP) and the central government, particularly the Three Red Banners and the Socialist Education Movement (SEM), proved to be ideologically detrimental to the worsening famine. The Three Red Banners of the CCP "sparked the fanaticism of 1958". The implementation of the Mass line, one of the three banners which told people to "go all out, aim high, and build socialism with greater, better, and more economical results", is cited in connection to the pressures officials felt to report a superabundance of grain. The SEM, established in 1957, also led to the severity of the famine in various ways, including causing the "illusion of superabundance" (浮夸风). Once the exaggerations of crop yields from the Mass Line were reported, "no one dared to 'dash cold water'" on further reports. The SEM also led to the establishment of conspiracy theories in which the peasants were believed to be pretending to be hungry in order to sabotage the state grain purchase.

=== Power relations in local governments ===
Local governments had just as much, if not more, influence on the famine as did higher rings of government. As the Great Leap Forward progressed, many provincial leaders began aligning themselves with Mao and higher Party leaders. Local leaders were forced to choose between doing what was best for their community and guarding their reputation politically. Landlords began "denouncing any opposition as 'conservative rightism'", which is defined broadly as anything anti-communist. In an environment of conspiracy theories directed against peasants, saving extra grain for a family to eat, espousing the belief that the Great Leap Forward should not be implemented, or merely not working hard enough were all seen as forms of "conservative rightism". Peasants became unable to speak openly on collectivization and state grain purchase. With a culture of fear and recrimination at both a local and official level, speaking and acting against the famine became a seemingly impossible task.

The influence of local government in the famine can be seen in the comparison between the provinces of Anhui and Jiangxi. Anhui, having a radical pro-Great Leap Forward government, was led by Zeng Xisheng who was "dictatorial" and refused to circulate orders from Beijing, including from Mao, that sought to rein in some Great Leap Forward policies. Zeng firmly believed in the Great Leap Forward and proposed agricultural projects without consulting colleagues, which caused Anhui's agriculture to fail terribly. Zhang Kaifan, a party secretary and deputy-governor of the province, heard rumours of a famine breaking out in Anhui and disagreed with many of Zeng's policies. Zeng reported Zhang to Mao for such speculations. As a result, according to Manning and Wemheuer in Eating Bitterness: New Perspectives on China's Great Leap Forward and Famine, Mao labeled Zhang "a member of the 'Peng Dehuai anti-Party military clique'" and he was purged from the local party. Zeng was unable to report on the famine when it became an emergency situation, as this would prove his hypocrisy. For this he was described as a "blatant political radical who almost single-handedly damaged Anhui". However, Zeng later supported the policy of "contracting farming to households" identified with Liu Shaoqi.

Jiangxi encountered a situation almost opposite to that of Anhui. The leaders of Jiangxi publicly opposed some of the Great Leap programs, quietly made themselves unavailable, and even appeared to take a passive attitude towards the Maoist economy. As the leaders worked collaboratively among themselves, they also worked with the local population. By creating an environment in which the Great Leap Forward did not become fully implemented, the Jiangxi government "did their best to minimize damage". From these findings, scholars Manning and Wemheuer concluded that much of the severity of the famine was due to provincial leaders and their responsibility for their regions.

=== Natural disasters ===
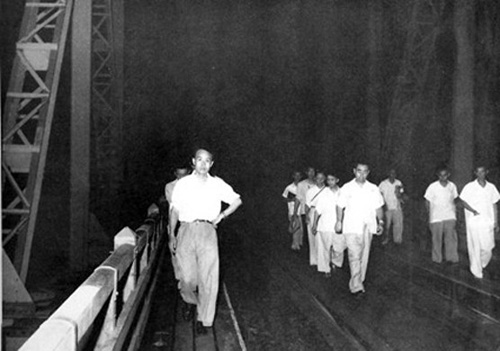
Premier Zhou Enlai (center front) visited Luokou Yellow River Bridge during the 1958 Yellow River flood.

In 1958, there was a notable regional flood of the Yellow River which affected part of Henan Province and Shandong Province. It was reported as the most severe flood of the Yellow River since 1933. In July 1958, the Yellow River flood affected 741,000 people in 1708 villages and inundated over 3.04 million mu (over half a million acres) of cultivated fields. The largest torrent of the flood was smoothly directed into the Bohai Sea on 27 July, and the government declared a "victory over the flood" after sending a rescue team of over 2 million people. The spokesperson of the Flood Prevention Center of Chinese government stated on 27 July 1958, that:

This year we defeated the large flood without division of torrents or breaks on dams, which secures the big harvest of the crops. This is yet another miracle created by the Chinese people.

But the government was encouraged to report success and hide failures. Because the 2 million farm laborers from the two provinces were ordered away from the fields to serve as a rescue team and were repairing the banks of the river instead of tending to their fields, "crops are neglected and much of the harvest is left to rot in the fields". In contrast, historian Frank Dikötter has argued that most floods during the famine were not due to unusual weather, but to massive, poorly planned and poorly executed irrigation works which were part of the Great Leap Forward. At this time, encouraged by Mao Zedong, people in China were building a large number of dams and thousands of kilometers of new irrigation canals in an attempt to move water from wet areas to areas that were experiencing drought. Some of the works, such as the Red Flag Canal, made positive contributions to irrigation, but researchers have pointed out that the massive hydraulic construction project led to many deaths due to starvation, epidemics, and drowning, which contributed to the famine.

However, there have been disagreements on the significance of the drought and floods in causing the Great Famine. According to published data from Chinese Academy of Meteorological Sciences (中国气象科学研究院), the drought in 1960 was not uncommon and its severity was only considered "mild" compared to that in other years—it was less serious than those in 1955, 1963, 1965–1967, and so on. Moreover, Yang Jisheng, a senior journalist from Xinhua News Agency, reports that Xue Muqiao, then head of the National Statistics Bureau of China, said in 1958, "We give whatever figures the upper-level wants" to overstate natural disasters and relieve official responsibility for deaths due to starvation. Yang claimed that he investigated other sources including a non-government archive of meteorological data from 350 weather stations across China, and the droughts, floods, and temperatures during 1958–1961 were within the typical patterns for China. According to Basil Ashton:

Many foreign observers felt that these reports of weather-related crop failures were designed to cover up political factors that had led to poor agricultural performance. They also suspected that local officials tended to exaggerate such reports to obtain more state assistance or tax relief. Clearly, the weather contributed to the appalling drop in output, but it is impossible to assess to what extent.

Despite these claims, other scholars have provided provincial-level demographic panel data which quantitatively proved that weather was also an important factor, particularly in those provinces which experienced excessively wet conditions. According to economist Daniel Houser and others, 69% of the Famine was due to government policies while the rest (31%) was due to natural disasters.

== Extent of the famine ==
=== Production drop ===
Policy changes affecting how farming was organized coincided with droughts and floods. Weather had been relatively mild for much of the 1950s, but became particularly bad by 1959, driving down crop yields. As a result, year-over-year grain production fell dramatically. The harvest was down by 15% in 1959 compared to 1958, and by 1960, it was at 70% of its 1958 level. Specifically, according to China's governmental data, crop production decreased from 200 million tons (or 400 billion jin) in 1958 to 170 million tons (or 340 billion jin) in 1959, and to 143.5 million tons (or 287 billion jin) in 1960.

=== Death toll ===
Birth and death rates in China

The excess mortality associated with the famine is intensely debated. The death toll has been estimated by Chinese and international academics and by Chinese officials and former officials. Gao Mobo, a Chinese-Australian professor of Chinese studies, notes that anti-communist writers prefer to stretch the death toll number "as high as possible", while writers sympathetic to the Chinese Communist Revolution seek numbers "as low as possible". Gao notes criticisms of the "fraudulent" methods used by anti-communist Frank Dikötter in particular, including from historian Anthony Garnaut who condemned Dikötter for "using archival anecdotes stripped of geographic, temporal, and institutional context” and for drawing “generalizations from fragmentary evidence". Dikötter has himself said that "different authors have tinkered with this or that variable either to lower or to heighten the number" because "the data present a whole range of problems, from lack of internal consistency to the under-registration of births and deaths and exclusion of the armed forces".

According to a declassified CIA report, Mao Zedong suggested that "unnatural deaths" exceeded 5 million in 1960–1961, while speaking to Field Marshal Montgomery in Autumn 1961.

Many Chinese scholars have cited figures around 30 million excess deaths over the three years of famine.

Official statistics record China's population in 1961 at 658.59 million, 14.58 million lower than in 1959. However, this is complicated by the unreliable nature of Chinese census data from the time. For example, there had been an anomalous increase of 11.92 million from 1956 to 1959.

Chinese mathematician Sun Jingxian studied official population statistics for the period between 1954 and 1982, finding "dramatic discrepancies" due to the incomplete implementation of the household registration system at the time. Sun suggests that the anomalous increase in the population from 1956 to 1959 was due to only 18.18 million of 30 million migrants from rural to urban areas in those years de-registering their rural residency. For example, Shandong province over-estimated its population in 1959 by 1.52 million due to duplicate registrations. From the second half of 1960, national policy aimed to reverse the trend of rural-to-urban migration and reduce the urban population, with 10 million people being moved from urban to rural areas in 1961 alone. However, Sun finds that, of the 23.25 million urban residents who cancelled their urban registration and moved to rural areas from 1961 to 1963, only 9.77 million registered as rural residents while 13.48 million went unregistered. Although household registration was a requirement for urban residents to receive food coupons, rural food distribution was organized more informally within each production unit and so the incentive to register was lesser. In total, Sun finds an anomalous population increase of 26.45 million in the two periods 1954-1959 and 1965-1982, close to the 26.44 million decrease in the period 1960-1964.

Due to the lack of food and reduced incentive to marry, according to official accounts the birth rate decreased from 2.922% (1958) to 2.086% (1960) and the death rate increased from 1.198% (1958) to 2.543% (1960). For 1962-1965, the average birth rate is about 4% and the average death rate is about 1%. The mortality in the birth and death rates both peaked in 1961 and began recovering rapidly after that. However, Sun Jingxian suggests that pre-1958 recorded death rates were anomalously low and that this was due to widespread under-reporting of deaths in rural areas as found by government surveys in 1953 and 1957. Sun proposes a revised death rate of 1.305% for 1958, with approximately 700,000 unreported deaths, and a total of 7.5 million unreported deaths between 1953 and 1958. Sun then finds death rates of 1.493% for 1959, 1.555% for 1960 and 1.427% for 1961 when adjusting for late de-registration of 6.75 million people whose deaths in previous years had gone unreported.

==== Table of estimates ====
Deaths (in millions)	Researchers	Year	Method	Notes
55	Yu Xiguang (余习广)	2015	Documentary research	Yu is a Chinese historian and a former instructor at the Central Party School of the Chinese Communist Party. In Great Leap Forward: A Collection of Letters about the Tough Days, Yu estimated that 55 million people died due to the famine.
45+	Frank Dikötter	2010	Documentary research	Dikötter is a Dutch humanities professor at the University of Hong Kong. In Mao's Great Famine, Dikötter estimated that at least 45 million people died from starvation, overwork and state violence during the Great Leap Forward, claiming his findings to be based on access to recently opened local and provincial party archives. His study also stressed that state violence exacerbated the death toll. Dikötter claimed that at least 2.5 million of the victims were beaten or tortured to death. His approach to the documents, as well as his claim to be the first author to use them, however, have been questioned by some other scholars. Reviewing Mao's Great Famine, historian Cormac Ó Gráda wrote that "MGF is full of numbers but there are few tables and no graphs. [....] On page after page of MGF, numbers [...] are produced with no discussion of their reliability or provenance: all that seems to matter is that they are 'big'." Ó Gráda notes that Dikötter's "sputnik" estimates for the death toll of the 1990s North Korean famine were about six times higher than scholarly estimates. Sociologist Andrew G. Walder argued that Dikötter's high death toll estimates were unsupported by age-specific population data and by historian Anthony Garnaut who writes that Dikötter's sampling techniques fall short of academic best practices.
43–46	Chen Yizi	1994	Unknown	Chen was a Chinese economist and a senior advisor to former CPC General Secretary Zhao Ziyang who defected to the United States in 1989. He was a member of the Economic System Reform Institute (SRI), which he said sent a team of 200 officials visited every province in China to examine internal CPC documents and records on the Great Leap Forward. Chen stated that 43–46 million people died due to the famine. Chen's methods are disputed. When Yang Songlin interviewed Wang Xiaoqiang, the executive director of the SRI, he simply "denied there was ever a project of investigation on the GLF", which would have required more scholars and funding than the SRI ever had. The Washington Post says Chen conducted a county-by-county review of deaths in five provinces, then extrapolated to the country as a whole. Economist Carl Riskin wrote that "Chen Yizi's methods of estimation are unknown" because they are unpublished. Historian Cormac Ó Gráda wrote that "Yizi's estimate is unverifiable". Economist Chris Bramall rejects Chen's estimate as mere rhetoric, part of Deng and Zhao's "remit of discrediting the Maoist regime" to justify reform and opening up. British journalist Jasper Becker followed Chen's estimate in his book Hungry Ghosts: Mao's Secret Famine.
40	Liao Gailong (廖盖隆)	2000		Liao, former deputy director of the History Research Unit of the CCP, reported 40 million "unnatural" deaths due to the famine.
40+	Jin Hui (金辉)	1993		Jin Hui, a scholar at Shanghai University, estimated at least 40 million deaths between 1959 and 1961.
35–44	Ding Shu (丁抒)	1997		Ding, a Chinese historian who worked at the Normandale Community College, estimated in his book that 35–44 million people died due to the famine between 1959 and 1961.
36	Mao Yushi	2011	Demographic estimate using a quadratic equation	Mao, a Chinese economist and winner of the 2012 Milton Friedman Prize for Advancing Liberty, fit national population statistics to a quadratic equation. Mao estimated that the 1961 population was 52 million lower than expected, of which 16 million from lower births and 36 million from starvation.
36	Yang Jisheng	2012	Documentary research	Yang was a journalist with Xinhua News Agency. In Tombstone: The Great Chinese Famine, 1958–1962, Yang stated there were 36 million deaths due to starvation, while another 40 million others failed to be born, so that "China's total population loss during the Great Famine then comes to 76 million". Yang's number is based upon estimates by Cao Shuji, Wang Weizhi, and Jin Hui. In response, historian Cormac Ó Gráda wrote that the results of a retrospective fertility survey "make the case for a total [death toll] much lower—perhaps ten million lower—than that proposed by Yang".
32.5	Cao Shuji (曹树基)	2005	Demographic estimate using birth and death records from 1,050 prefectures	Cao is a history professor at Shanghai Jiao Tong University. In "The Deaths of China's Population and Its Contributing Factors During 1959–1961", Cao used province-level data for 21 provinces, and local gazette data from 248 historical prefectures across 1,050 modern counties. Cao estimated the death toll at 32.5 million.
30	Lin Yunhui (林蕴晖)	2009		Lin is a history professor at the PLA National Defense University. Lin estimated 30 million abnormal deaths.
30	Judith Banister	1987	Demographic estimate using censuses, national birth and death records, and fertility survey	Banister is Director of Global Demographics at the Conference Board. Banister estimated 30 million excess deaths from 1958 to 1961.
30	Basil Ashton, et al.	1984	Demographic estimate using censuses, national birth and death records, and fertility survey	Ashton, Hill, Piazza, and Zeitz are population demographers. Ashton et al. estimated that around 30 million people died due to the famine between 1958 and 1962, meanwhile 33 million births were lost or postponed.
27	Ansley J. Coale	1984	Demographic estimate using censuses, national birth and death records, and fertility survey	Coale is a leading American demographer. Coale estimated the number of excess deaths to be 27 million between 1958 and 1963. However, former head of the National Bureau of Statistics of China, Li Chengrui (李成瑞), stated in 1996 that Coale's linear model of population change contained an error and should have led to a figure of 22 million rather than Coale's 27 million.
23	Peng Xizhe (彭希哲)	1987	Demographic estimate using birth and death records from 14 provinces	Peng is Professor of Population and Development at Fudan University. Peng estimated 23 million excess deaths during the famine.
15.3–24.7	Li Ruojian (李若建)	1998	Demographic estimate using two estimates of the overall death rate	Li, a professor at Sun Yat-sen University, stated that the simplest way to calculate famine deaths was to compare the death rate against the population statistics for 1957. Li used a death rate calculated from government death records and from Banister's figures to propose a famine death toll of 15.3 million and 24.7 million respectively.
18	Shujie Yao (姚书杰)	1999	Demographic estimate using national birth and death records	Yao, the Chair of Economics at the Business School of Middlesex University, concluded that 18 million people died due to the famine.
17	Jiang Zhenghua (蒋正华)	1986	Demographic estimate using population surveys	Jiang responded to Li Chengrui's call for further research into demography of the famine period in 1985. His research was reviewed by experts from the Population Census Office of the State Council, the China Population Association, Xi’an Jiaotong University, the National Bureau of Statistics of China, the MSS, the Chinese Academy of Social Sciences, Renmin University and the Chinese Institute of Applied Mathematical Science but was not endorsed as an official publication since the National Bureau of Statistics took the view that the topic was too complicated to review fully.
15.4	Daniel Houser, Barbara Sands, and Erte Xiao	2009	Statistical regression on demographic estimates from 28 provinces	Houser, Sands, and Xiao, writing in the Journal of Economic Behavior & Organization, estimated that China suffered 15.4 million excess deaths during the famine, of which 69% (or 10.6 million) were attributable to effects stemming from national policies.
15+	Chinese Academy of Sciences	1989		A research team at the Chinese Academy of Sciences concluded that at least 15 million people died of malnutrition.
4–5	Cheng Enfu (程恩富) and Zhan Zhihua (詹志华)	2017	Demographic estimation using national birth and death records	Cheng and Zhan are two professors of Marxism. Cheng and Zhan note that, in 1957, a population survey estimated 8.35 million deaths while the official population statistics count 6.88 million deaths, a discrepancy of 1.47 million. In contrast, in 1964, the 1964 Chinese census and official population statistics showed no discrepancy. Cheng and Zhan thus argue that 8 million unreported deaths occurred from 1953 to 1957, which were only counted in 1959–1961, when the Regulations on Household Registers was implemented. For 1959–1961, Cheng and Zhan put total deaths at 36.28 million, minus 8 million unreported deaths to 28.28 million, "natural" deaths at 23.30 million, (Note: Note: In Method 3 after adjustment (page 183), Cheng and Zhan calculate "natural" deaths in 1959–1961 as the linear interpolation between average total deaths in 1953–1957 and 1962–1964, without making any demographic adjustments.) yielding 4.98 million unnatural deaths.
3.5–4	Yang Songlin (杨松林)	2013	Demographic estimation using national birth and death records	Yang is a political economist. In China's Great Leap Forward, Household Registration and the Famine Death Tally, Yang argues that the State Family Planning Commission's retrospective fertility survey estimates were systematically higher than the official population statistics, which were based on an incomplete household registration system. After several adjustments, Yang estimates 3.5–4 million excess deaths.
3.66	Sun Jingxian (孙经先)	2016	Demographic estimation using censuses, national birth and death records, and fertility survey	Sun, professor of mathematics at Shandong University, estimates that approximately 3.66 million excess deaths occurred. Sun argues that the estimates of 30 million or more are due to failure to account for large amounts of unregistered population movement during the famine years and are explained by study of population data over a longer period (1954-1982). However, of the 3.66 million figure, Sun notes: "This figure cannot be treated as exact and conclusive, but is nonetheless a logical conclusion from examining anomalous population change data... The point is that any discussion of the anomalous population change during the GLF should not, and cannot be separated from discussing anomalous population change both before and after." Sun stated he had reviewed local records from the 600 worst affected counties and found they aligned with his findings. However, Chinese historian Hong Zhenkuai (洪振快), who worked with Yang Jisheng on the magazine Yanhuang Chunqiu, accused Sun of lying and departing from the facts.

=== Oral accounts ===
Lu Baoguo, a Xinhua reporter based in Xinyang, explained to Yang Jisheng why he never reported on his experience:

In the second half of 1959, I took a long-distance bus from Xinyang to Luoshan and Gushi. Out of the window, I saw one corpse after another in the ditches. On the bus, no one dared to mention the dead. In one county, Guangshan, one-third of the people had died. Although there were dead people everywhere, the local leaders enjoyed good meals and fine liquor. ... I had seen people who had told the truth being destroyed. Did I dare to write it?

Yu Dehong, the secretary of a party official in Xinyang in 1959 and 1960, stated:

I went to one village and saw 100 corpses, then another village and another 100 corpses. No one paid attention to them. People said that dogs were eating the bodies. Not true, I said. The dogs had long ago been eaten by the people.

==== Cannibalism ====
There are widespread oral reports, though little official documentation, of human cannibalism being practiced in various forms as a result of the famine. To survive, people had to resort to every possible means, from eating soil and poisons to stealing and killing and even to eating human flesh. Yang Jisheng, a retired Chinese reporter, said "Parents ate their own kids. Kids ate their own parents. And we couldn't have imagined there was still grain in the warehouses. At the worst time, the government was still exporting grain." Due to the scale of the famine, some have speculated that the resulting cannibalism could be described as "on a scale unprecedented in the history of the 20th century".

== Aftermath ==
=== Initial reactions and cover-ups ===
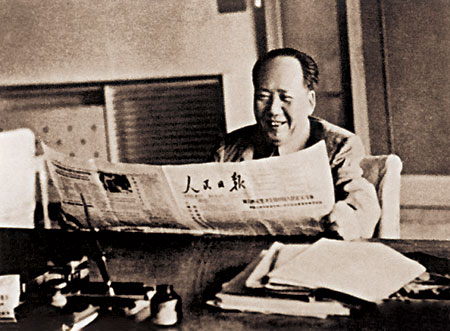
Mao Zedong reading People's Daily (1961).

Provincial and local party leaders, for their part, conspired to cover up shortfalls and reassign blame in order to protect their own lives and positions. Mao was kept unaware of some of the starvation of villagers in the rural areas who were suffering, as the birth rate began to plummet and deaths increased in 1958 and 1959. In 1960, as gestures of solidarity, Mao reportedly ate no meat for seven months and Zhou Enlai cut his monthly grain consumption.

In visits to Henan province in 1958, Mao observed what local officials claimed was increases in crop yield of one thousand to three thousand percent achieved, supposedly, in massive 24-hour pushes organized by the officials which they called "sputnik launches". But the numbers were faked, and so were the fields that Mao observed, which had been carefully prepared in advance of Mao's visit by local officials, who removed shoots of grain from various fields and carefully transplanted them into a field prepared especially for Mao, to appear to be a bumper crop.

The local officials became trapped by these sham demonstrations to Mao, and exhorted the peasants to reach unattainable goals, by "deep ploughing and close planting", among other techniques. This ended up making things much worse; the crop failed completely, leaving barren fields. Jasper Becker claims that, because no one was in a position to challenge Mao's ideas as incorrect, peasants went to extreme lengths to keep up the charade; some grew seedlings in their bedding and coats and, after the seedlings quickly sprouted, "planted" them in fields using the bedding to make the plants look high and healthy. However, Yang Jisheng noted that Mao had issued "practical and realistic" communiques going against the Great Leap Forward, which some hardline provincial officials like Sichuan's Li Jingquan and Anhui's Zeng Xisheng repeatedly refused to deliver.

The post office in Xinyang confiscated 1,200 outgoing letters begging for help. Yang Jisheng said:

When the Guangshan County post office discovered an anonymous letter to Beijing disclosing starvation deaths, the public security bureau began hunting down the writer. One of the post office's counter staff recalled that a pockmarked woman had mailed the letter. The local public security bureau rounded up and interrogated every pockmarked woman without identifying the culprit. It was subsequently determined that the writer worked in Zhengzhou and had written the letter upon returning to her home village and seeing people starving to death.

Yang and Becker have both claimed that doctors were prohibited from listing "starvation" as a cause of death on death certificates. This kind of deception was far from uncommon; a famous propaganda picture from the famine shows Chinese children from Shandong province ostensibly standing atop a field of wheat, so densely grown that it could apparently support their weight. In reality, they were standing on a bench concealed beneath the plants, and the "field" was again entirely composed of individually transplanted stalks.

=== Special supply and relief measure ===
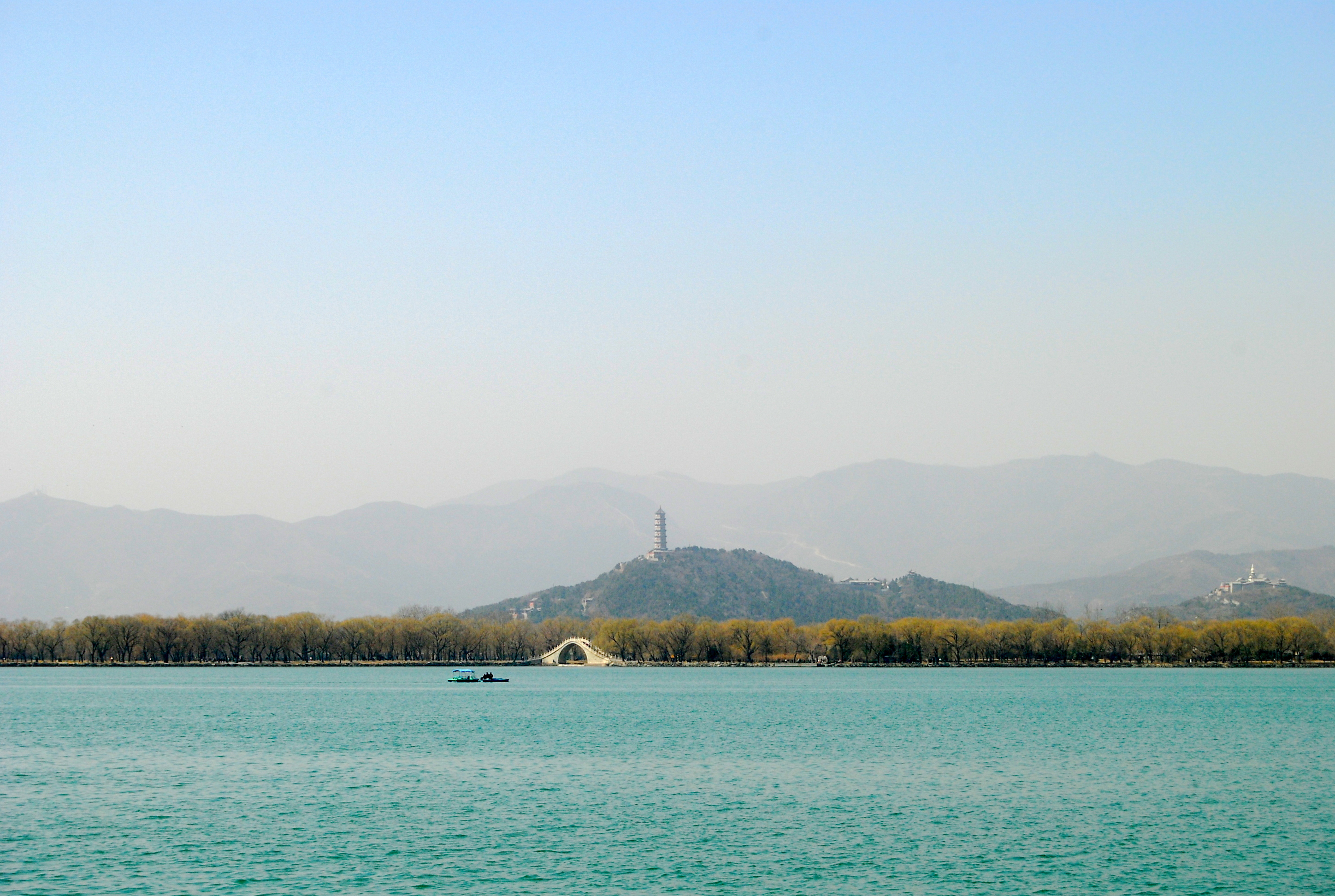
Jade Spring Hill in Beijing, where a special farm was established with the help of Soviet experts to supply food exclusively to Mao Zedong and other senior CCP leaders since early 1950s.

In November 1960, a special supply system (or tegong) was established nationwide during the Great Famine, providing food and daily necessities exclusively to high-ranking officials of the Chinese Communist Party and Chinese government. This special supply system can be traced back to the Yan'an period of the CCP, prior to the founding of the People's Republic of China in October 1949.

In January 1961, the 9th Plenary Session of the 8th Central Committee initiated a policy of readjustment summarized as "adjustment, consolidation, filling out, and improvement", marking a shift away from some of the Great Leap Forward's most extreme measures. China also increased grain purchases and imports beginning in 1961. Between 1961 and 1963, China imported grain from countries including Australia and Canada; these imports were used to supply cities and, in turn, made it possible to reduce grain collections demanded from rural producers.

=== Response from Taiwan ===
In response to the famine, the Nationalist government in Taipei delivered food, along with propaganda leaflets of Chiang Kai-shek, to the mainland via parachute drops conducted by the ROC air force.

=== Cultural Revolution ===
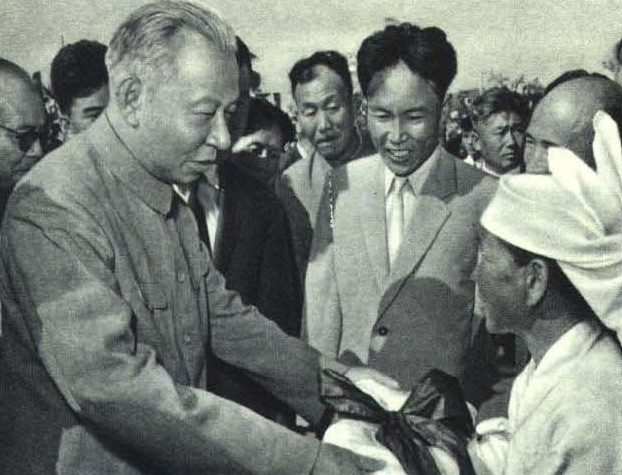
Liu Shaoqi visiting North Korea (1963).

In April and May 1961, Liu Shaoqi, then President of China, concluded after 44 days of field research in villages of Hunan that the causes of the famine were 30% natural disaster and 70% human error (三分天灾, 七分人祸).

In January and February 1962, the "7000 Cadres Conference" took place in Beijing, which was attended by more than 7,000 CCP officials nationwide. During the conference, Liu formally announced his conclusion on the causes of the great famine, while the Great Leap Forward was declared "over" by the Chinese Communist Party. The policies of Mao Zedong were criticized.

The failure of the Great Leap Forward as well as the famine forced Mao Zedong to withdraw from active decision-making within the CCP and the central government, and turn various future responsibilities over to Liu Shaoqi and Deng Xiaoping. A series of economic reforms were carried out by Liu and Deng and others, including policies such as sanzi yibao (三自一包) which allowed free market and household responsibility for agricultural production.

However, the disagreement between Mao Zedong, Liu Shaoqi and Deng Xiaoping over economic and social policy grew larger. In 1963, Mao launched the Socialist Education Movement and in 1966, he launched the Cultural Revolution, during which Liu was accused of being a traitor and enemy agent for attributing only 30% to natural calamities. Liu was beaten and denied medicine for diabetes and pneumonia; he died in 1969. Deng was accused of being a "capitalist roader" during the Cultural Revolution and was purged twice.

=== Reforms and reflections ===
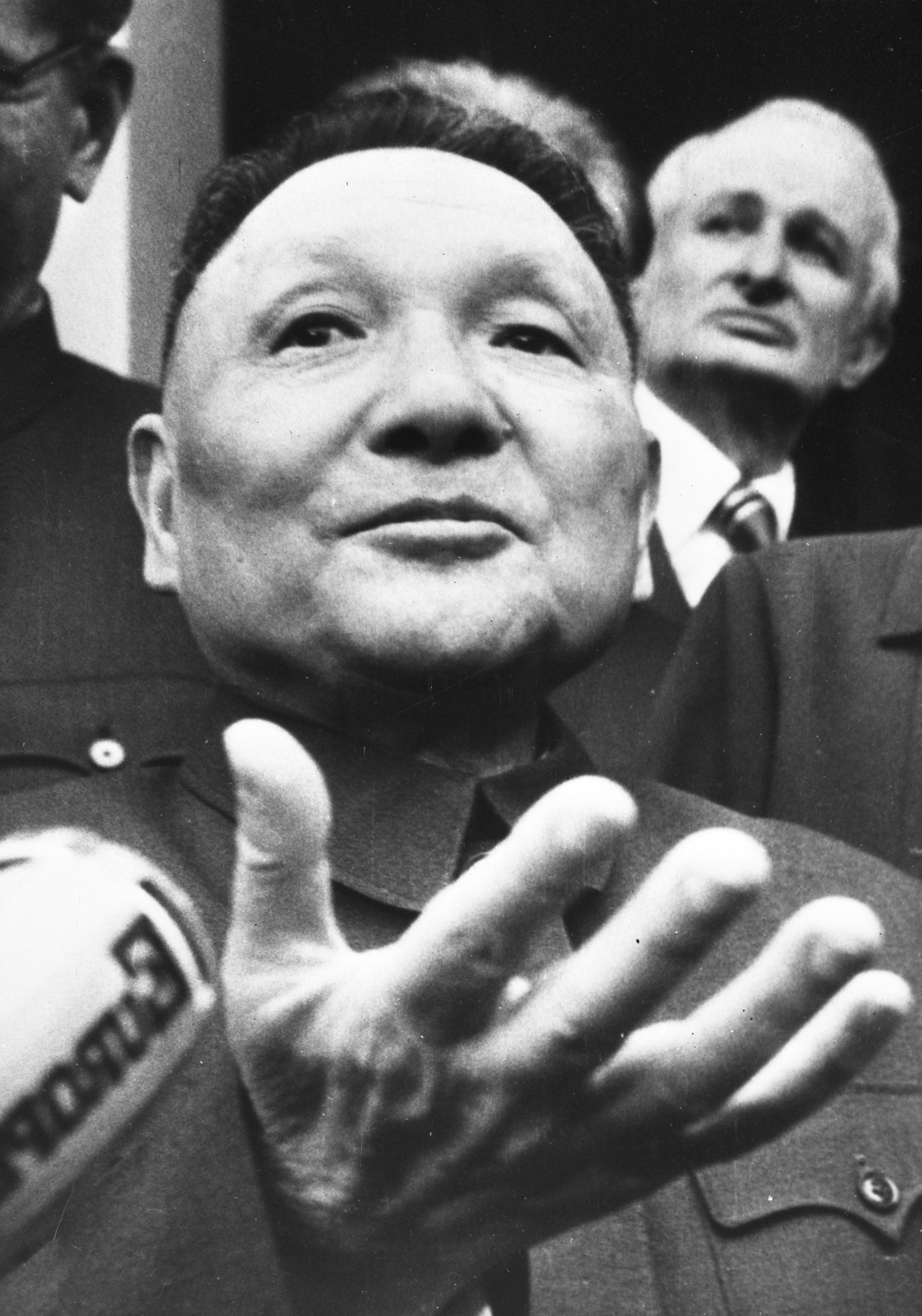
Deng Xiaoping

In December 1978, Deng Xiaoping became the new Paramount Leader of China and launched the historic Reform and opening up program which fundamentally changed the agricultural and industrial system in China. Until the early 1980s, the Chinese government's stance was that the famine was largely a result of a series of natural disasters compounded by several planning errors, reflected by the name "Three Years of Natural Disasters". During the "Boluan Fanzheng" period in June 1981, the Chinese Communist Party (CCP) officially changed the name to "Three Years of Difficulty", and stated that the famine was mainly due to the mistakes of the Great Leap Forward as well as the Anti-Right Deviation Struggle, in addition to some natural disasters and the Sino-Soviet split. Academic studies on the Great Chinese Famine also became more active in mainland China after 1980, when the government started to release some demographic data to the public. A number of high-ranking Chinese officials had expressed their views on the famine:

- Zhao Ziyang, former General Secretary of the Chinese Communist Party, once said that "our Party never admitted mistakes. If things got really bad, we just found some scapegoats and blamed them, like Lin Biao and the Gang of Four. If scapegoats were hard to find, we simply blamed natural disasters, such as for the great famine in the late 1950s and early 1960s when tens of millions of people died, which was simply due to political errors of the Party."
- Bo Yibo, one of the Eight Elders and former Vice Premier of China, once said, "During the three difficult years, people across the country went into malnutrition due to lack of food, and edema was prevalent, resulting in an increasing number of deaths due to starvation among many rural areas. It is estimated that in 1960 alone, more than 10 million people died. With such thing happening during a time of peace, we as members of the Communist Party feel truly guilty in front of the people, and we must never forget this heavy lesson! "
- Wan Li, former President of the National People's Congress of China, stated that "during the three difficult years after the People's Commune movement, people everywhere had edema and even starved to death. In Anhui alone, according to reports, there were 3-4 million people died 'abnormally' ...... We had been ' left ' for too long, and farmers were no longer motivated to work."
- Tian Jiyun, former Vice Premier of China and former Vice President of the National People's Congress of China, stated that "looking back at the Three Years of Difficulty, people everywhere had edema and died of starvation, and tens of millions of people died abnormally, more than the total death toll during the entire Democratic Revolution. What was the reason for that? Liu Shaoqi said it was '30% natural disasters and 70% human error.' But it is now clear that the famine was mainly due to human error, which was the erroneous command, the 'Utopian Socialism', and the 'Left opportunism'."

Researchers outside China have argued that the massive institutional and policy changes which accompanied the Great Leap Forward were the key factors in the famine, or at least worsened nature-induced disasters. In particular, Nobel laureate Amartya Sen puts this famine in a global context, arguing that lack of democracy is the major culprit: "Indeed, no substantial famine has ever occurred in a democratic country—no matter how poor." He adds that it is "hard to imagine that anything like this could have happened in a country that goes to the polls regularly and that has an independent press. During that terrible calamity the government faced no pressure from newspapers, which were controlled, and none from opposition parties, which were absent." Sen though also argues: "Despite the gigantic size of excess mortality in the Chinese famine, the extra mortality in India from regular deprivation in normal times vastly overshadows the former. [...] India seems to manage to fill its cupboard with more skeletons every eight years than China put there in its years of shame."

== See also ==
- Bibliography of the Great Leap Forward and the Great Chinese Famine
- Bibliographies of the People's Republic of China
- Criticism of communist party rule
- History of the Chinese Communist Party
- History of the People's Republic of China
- List of campaigns of the Chinese Communist Party
  - Four Pests campaign
  - Eliminate Sparrows campaign
- List of famines
- List of famines in China
  - Northern Chinese Famine of 1876–1879
  - Chinese famine of 1906–1907
  - Chinese famine of 1928–1930
  - Chinese famine of 1942–1943
- List of incidents of cannibalism
- Maoism
