= Four Pests campaign =

Chinese government policy encouraging hostility to perceived biological pests

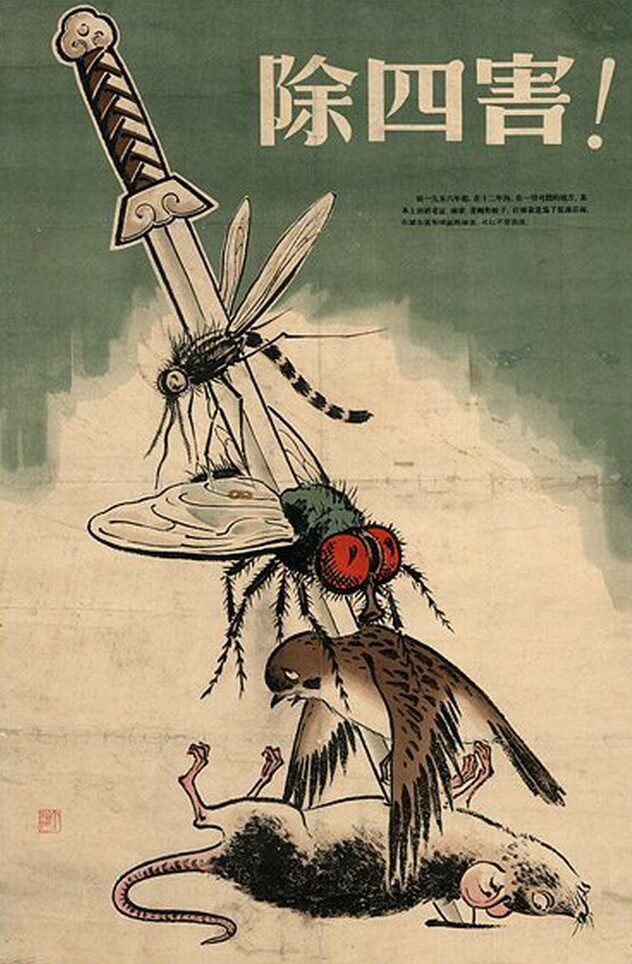
Chinese poster reading "Exterminate The Four Pests" (Chinese: 除四害; pinyin: Chú Sì Hài), 1958.

The Four Pests campaign (Chinese: 除四害; pinyin: Chú Sì Hài) was one of the first campaigns of the Great Leap Forward in Maoist China from 1958 to 1962. Authorities targeted four "pests" for elimination: rats, flies, mosquitoes, and sparrows.

The extermination of sparrows – also known as the Eliminate Sparrows campaign – resulted in severe ecological imbalance, and was one of the causes of the Great Chinese Famine which lasted from 1959 to 1961, with an estimated death toll due to starvation ranging in the tens of millions (15 to 55 million). (Note: According to various sources.) In 1960, the campaign against sparrows ended, and bed bugs replaced them as an official target.

== Background ==
The eradication of the four pests together was first mentioned in Mao Zedong's 17-Point Agriculture Policy, in 1955, (Note: also known as the Seventeen-Article Document Concerning Agriculture) as a way to reduce infectious diseases and grain loss caused by pests. In January 1956, the 17-point policy was expanded into the draft of National Programme for Agricultural Development (1956–1967), which mentioned that "starting from 1956, we should work to eradicate rats, sparrows, flies, and mosquitoes in all areas possible across the country within five, seven or twelve years". The draft was adopted by the Central Committee of the Chinese Communist Party in 1957, with the timeline revised to twelve years.

Among other factors, the failure of food production during the Great Leap Forward was caused by newly mandated agricultural practices imposed by the state. In December 1958, Mao Zedong created the Eight Elements Constitution, eight pieces of agricultural advice purportedly based on science, which were then adopted throughout China. Contrary to expectations, most of the elements decreased agricultural production.

== Campaign ==
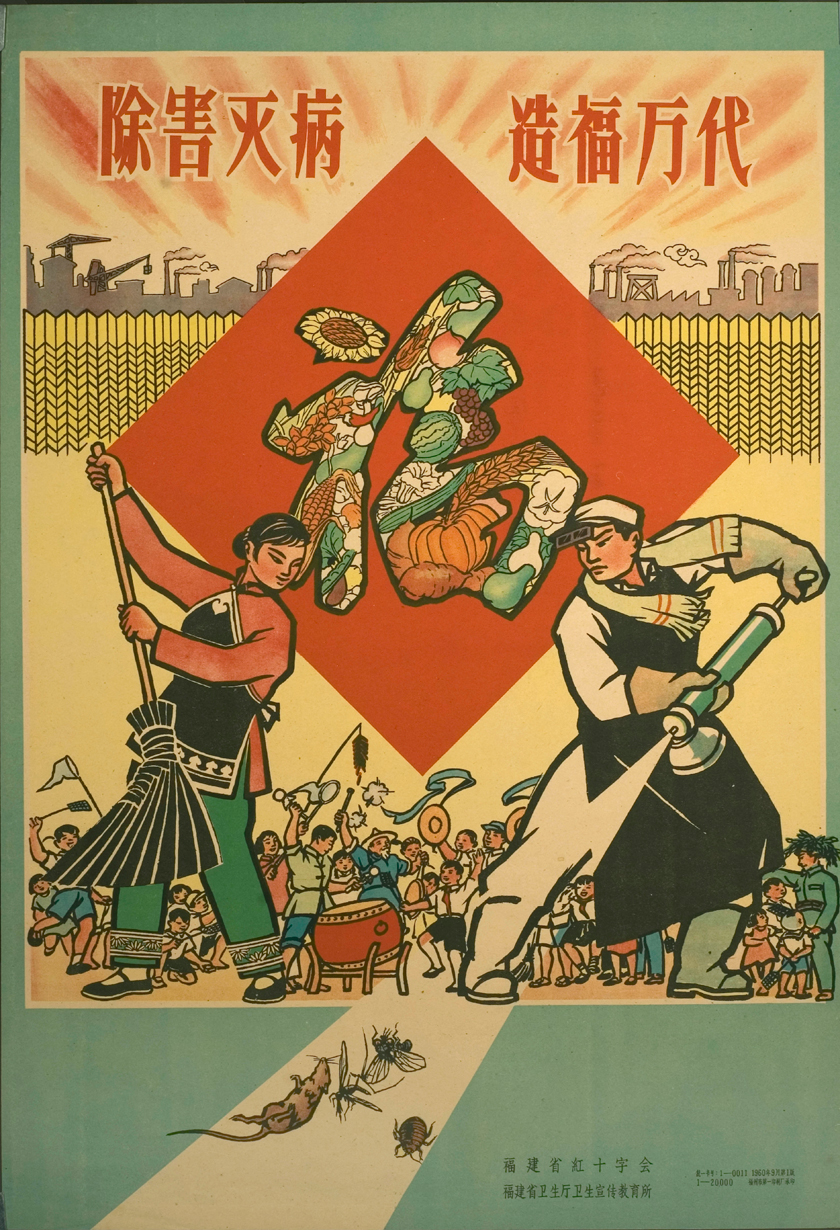
"Eradicate pests and diseases and build happiness for ten thousand generations" (1960). A poster used during the Four Pests Campaign, in which sparrows had been replaced by bed bugs.

The "Four Pests" campaign was introduced as a hygiene campaign aimed to eradicate the pests responsible for the transmission of pestilence and disease:

- the mosquitos responsible for malaria
- the rodents that spread the plague
- the pervasive airborne flies
- the sparrows—specifically the Eurasian tree sparrow—which ate grain, seed, and fruit

Though efforts to eradicate the pests were already well underway in 1957, the campaign would not be officially launched until February 12, 1958. The campaign peaked in the 1957/1958 winter, and a February 1958 article in The People's Daily mentioned:

more than 300 million rats and sparrows, and more than 246,000 catties (4.54 million boxes) of mosquitoes and flies had been eliminated. More than 3,392,000 catties of fly larvae had been killed. Tens of millions of tons of garbage had been removed. The sanitary condition in urban and rural areas had been greatly improved

Activity began decreasing in the second half of 1958, due to the effects of the Great Leap Forward. In 1960, sparrows were replaced with bed bugs, and a number of city initiatives were aimed towards the campaign. However, the collapsing economy meant the campaign was rarely carried out after 1961.

In 1958, the government reported nearly 1.9 billion rats, and nearly 2 billion sparrows were killed. In 1959, the campaign reportedly killed over 1 billion sparrows, 1.5 billion rats, 100 million kilograms (200 million pounds) of flies, and 11 million kilograms (25 million pounds) of mosquitoes, though the reliability of these figures are questionable.

=== Sparrows ===
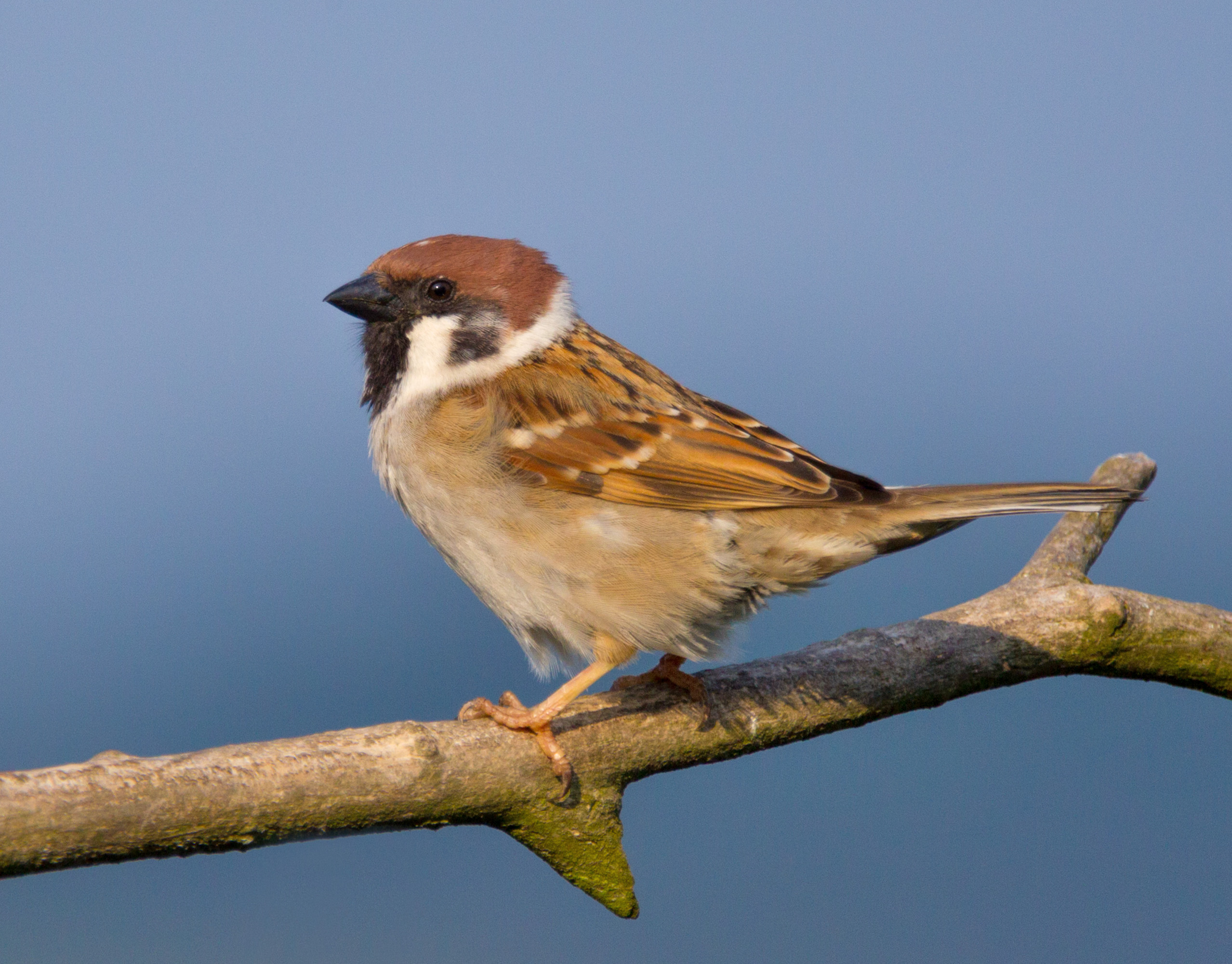
The Eurasian tree sparrow was the most notable target of the Four Pests campaign.

In an attempt to accomplish the significant task of changing the ecological order, Mao mobilized the Chinese population aged five and above. Similar to a coordinated military campaign, schoolchildren would disperse into the countryside at a specific hour to hunt sparrows. A firsthand account from a former Sichuan schoolchild at the time of the campaign recounted, "It was fun to 'Wipe out the Four Pests'. The whole school went to kill sparrows. We made ladders to knock down their nests, and beat gongs in the evenings, when they were coming home to roost." In Beijing, the People's Daily reported "Every morning and from 4:00 p.m. to 7:30 p.m., when sparrows were out of their nests and returning to their nests, citizens would work together to chase them". To organize and promote the campaign, meetings were held and propaganda posters, leaflets, films and jingles were created. Contributing to the campaign was seen as a citizen's patriotic duty.

Methods of eliminating sparrows included catching them by hand; using glue traps, net traps, and other traps; using poisoned bait; and attacking them with poles. Sparrow nests were destroyed, eggs were broken, and chicks were killed. Many people organized into groups and banged loud objects together to prevent sparrows from resting in their nests, with the goal of causing them to drop dead through sheer fatigue. Tools employed included wire clamps, wire cages, bamboo poles, red flags, firecrackers, stones, slingshots, gongs, megaphones, washbasins, air guns, and scarecrows. Citizens shot the birds down from the sky with slingshots or guns. The campaign depleted the sparrow population, pushing it to near extinction within China.

Some sparrows found a refuge in the extraterritorial premises of various diplomatic missions in China. The personnel of the Polish embassy in Beijing denied the Chinese request to enter the embassy premises and scare away the sparrows who were hiding there, and as a result the embassy was surrounded by people with drums. After two days of constant drumming, the Poles had to use shovels to clear the embassy of dead sparrows.

== Consequences ==
The sparrow campaign ended in disaster, although the other three anti-pest campaigns may have contributed to the improvement in health statistics in the 1950s. By April 1960, Chinese Communist Party leaders changed their opinion on the Eliminate Sparrows campaign in part due to the influence of ornithologist Tso-hsin Cheng who pointed out that sparrows ate a large number of insects, as well as grains. Mao Zedong ordered the campaign against sparrows to end, replacing them with bedbugs.

=== Ecological consequences of sparrow elimination ===
Millions of sparrows were killed. While the campaign was meant to increase yields, concurrent droughts and floods as well as the lacking sparrow population decreased rice yields. The extermination of sparrows upset the ecological balance, which subsequently resulted in surging locust and other insect populations that destroyed crops due to a lack of a natural predator.

With no sparrows to eat them, locust populations ballooned, swarming the country and compounding the ecological problems already caused by the Great Leap Forward, including widespread deforestation and misuse of poisons and pesticides. Although sparrows were removed from the Four Pests in 1960, the disruption of ecological balance, combined with errors in food distribution policies and the exaggeration of crop production figures, led to the Great Chinese Famine. According to a 2025 study, the anti-sparrow campaign accounted for a nearly 20 percent drop in crop production, leading to the deaths of two million people.

By the end of the Four Pests campaign, the Eurasian tree sparrow was practically extinct from China, which afterwards imported 250,000 Eurasian tree sparrows from the Soviet Union to recover its population.
