= Eliminate Sparrows campaign =

1955-1960 Chinese campaign to exterminate sparrows

- Chinese: 消灭麻雀运动
- Literal meaning: "Eliminate/Exterminate Sparrows Campaign"
Transcriptions
Standard Mandarin
- Hanyu Pinyin: xiāomiè máquè yùndòng

Also known as
- Chinese: 打麻雀运动
- Literal meaning: "Smash/Attack/Beat Sparrows Campaign"
Transcriptions
Standard Mandarin
- Hanyu Pinyin: dǎ máquè yùndòng

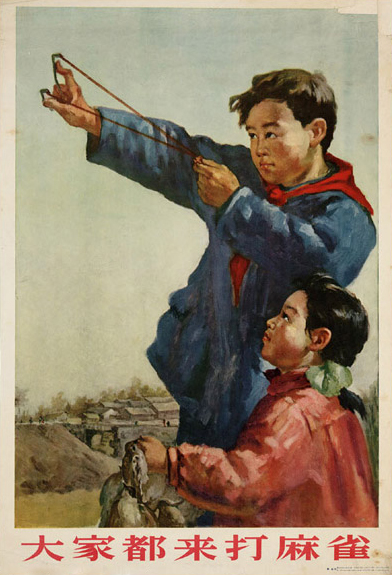
School students were among those mobilized to carry out the campaign. This 1956 promotional poster shows children killing sparrows with a slingshot. The text reads "Everyone Comes to Attack Sparrows" (Chinese: 大家都来打麻雀; pinyin: dàjiā dōu lái dǎ máquè).

The Eliminate Sparrows campaign, also known as the Smash Sparrows campaign or Great Sparrow Campaign, was a part of the Four Pests campaign launched by Mao Zedong, the first leader of the People's Republic of China, executed nationwide during the Great Leap Forward. The aim of the campaign was to completely eliminate sparrows throughout China.

The anti-sparrow policy was active from 1955 to 1960, with major implementation of the campaign starting in 1958. At least 200 million sparrows were killed nationwide in 1958; some sources say about 2.11 billion sparrows died. The campaign led to surging insect populations and poor harvests, and was one of the causes of the Great Chinese Famine, which lasted from 1959 to 1961 and killed millions of people.

== History ==
=== Origin ===
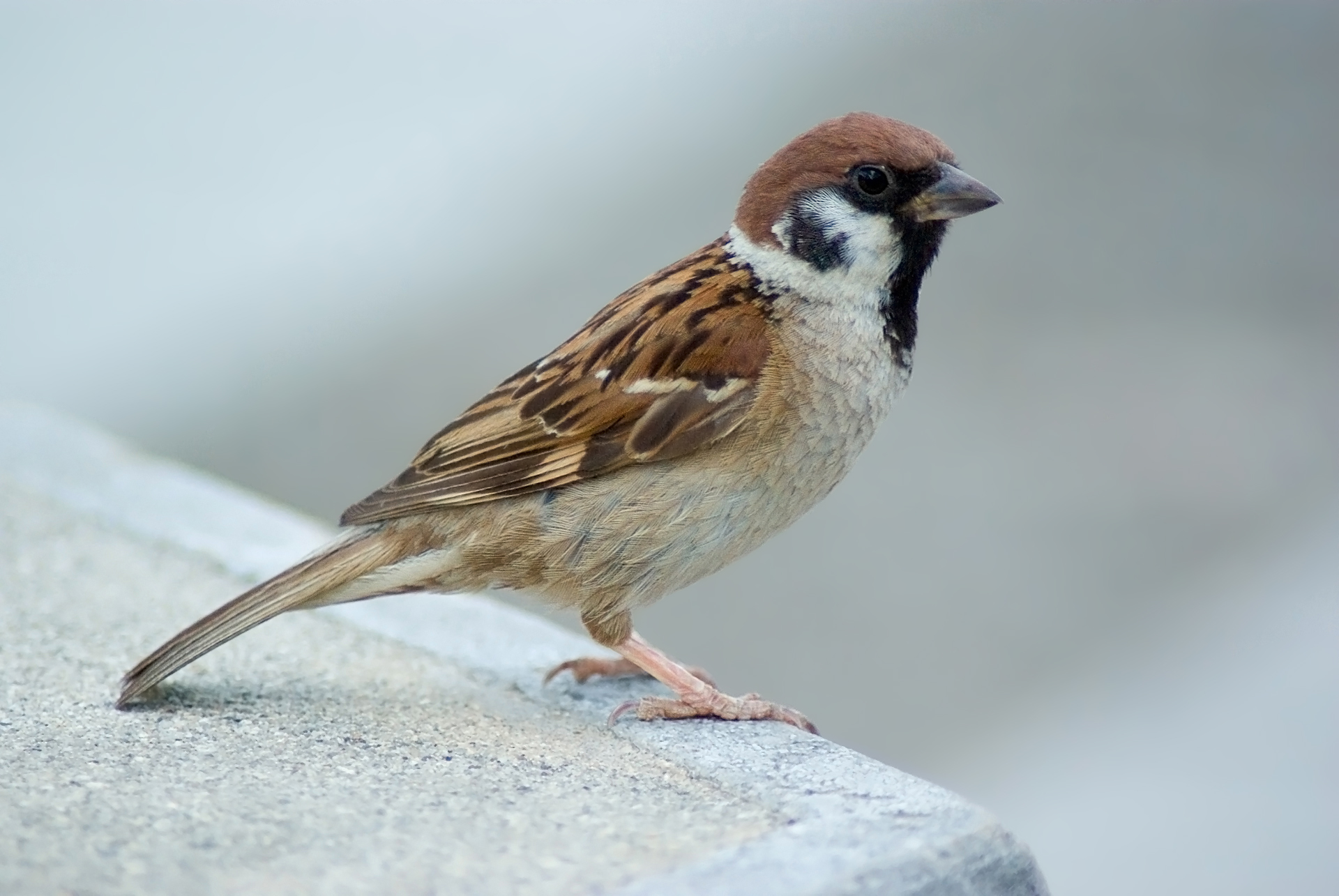
For several years, sparrows were systematically exterminated in both urban and rural areas, causing a severe ecological imbalance.

In 1955, farmers reported that sparrows were damaging crops. When Mao Zedong, then Chairman of the Chinese Communist Party, received these reports, he said sparrows were harmful pest birds and should be eliminated. In the second half of 1955, while organizing the drafting of the Agricultural Development Outline (i.e., the Seventeen Articles on Agriculture), Mao Zedong decided that sparrows, rats, flies, and mosquitoes were "Four Pests" to be removed. In January 1956, after discussion by the Politburo of the Chinese Communist Party and formal adoption by the Supreme State Conference, the expanded version of the Draft Outline was adopted. Article 27 of the Draft Outline stipulated that starting from 1956, rats, sparrows, flies, and mosquitoes should be more or less eliminated in all possible locations within 5, 7, or 12 years, respectively. Sparrows were suspected of consuming approximately 2 kg (4 pounds) of grain per sparrow per year.

In the autumn of 1956, a group of biologists, including Zhu Xi, a Chinese pioneer in cell biology, objected publicly to classifying sparrows as pests and eliminating them, but their objections were ineffective. On January 18, 1957, the Beijing Daily published an article by Zhou Jianren, then Vice Minister of Education, titled "Sparrows are Clearly Pest Birds", concluding that "there is no doubt sparrows are pest birds" and "pest birds should be eradicated without hesitation", proposing:

社会已经改变了，但旧社会的某些思想方法或观点仍然会残留着。过去时代不少人把自己看作是自然界的顺民，不敢有改造自然的想头，当然也不敢把自己看作是自然界的主人。.... 还有叫做均衡论的见解，也妨碍人们改造自然的决心。... 均衡论只强调了静止的一面，忽略了生物的历史是一个过程。.... 均衡论叫人害怕自然界如失掉均衡会闹出乱子。

Society has changed, but some of the old ways of thinking and viewpoints still remain. In the past, many people saw themselves as subservient subjects of nature, afraid to even consider transforming it, let alone see themselves as masters of nature... The concept of equilibrium has also hindered people's determination to transform nature... Equilibrium only emphasizes the static aspect, ignoring the fact that biological history is a process... (Belief in) equilibrium instills a fear that nature would descend into chaos if it lost its balance.

=== Implementation ===
At the end of 1957, the Great Leap Forward slogan was developed, and the Four Pests campaign was implemented across the country. Between March and May 1958, Mao Zedong called for the elimination of sparrows at several central conferences and during the 8th National Congress of the CCP. Subsequently, "sparrow suppression headquarters" (Chinese: 围剿麻雀总指挥部; pinyin: wéijiǎo máquè zǒng zhǐhuī bù) were established in various parts of the country, with local leaders directing efforts, and the Eliminate Sparrows campaign was launched. Newspapers across the country reported on the campaign extensively, often using military headlines such as "Deploying Troops, Preparing Weapons, Gearing Up: The Sparrow Extermination Army Awaits the Final Assault" and "The Sparrow Extermination Army Has Achieved Brilliant Results". A folk song circulating at the time was called "Beat Drums and Gongs to Eliminate the Four Pests" (Chinese: 擂鼓鸣金除四害; pinyin: léi gǔ míngjīn chú sì hài):

老鼠奸，麻雀坏，苍蝇蚊子像右派。吸人血，招病害，偷人幸福搞破坏。千家万户快动手，擂鼓鸣金除四害。

Rats are sly, sparrows bad, flies and mosquitoes are like right-wingers. They suck blood, bring disease, steal joy and destroy. Let every family move quickly; beat drums and gongs to eliminate the four pests.

On April 21, 1958, the Beijing Evening News published a poem by famed writer Guo Moruo entitled "Cursing the Sparrow" (Chinese: 咒麻雀; pinyin: zhòu máquè), which included the lines:

你真是个混蛋鸟，五气俱全到处跳。犯下罪恶几千年，今天和你总清算。毒打轰掏齐进攻，最后方使烈火烘。

You're a real bastard bird, jumping around with your airs. You've committed crimes for thousands of years; today we'll finally settle accounts with you. We'll attack you relentlessly, beating, bombing, and plundering; setting it all ablaze.

In 1961, Mikhail Antonovich Klochko, an advisor to the Institute of Chemistry of the Chinese Academy of Sciences and a Soviet chemist, recorded his observations from Beijing three years earlier.

The results of this extermination drive were felt soon enough. The whole campaign had been initiated in the first place by some bigwig of the Party who had decided that the sparrows were devouring too large a part of the harvests. (It goes without saying that none of the qualified experts was consulted and that the whole campaign was conceived and planned by the Party, and executed under its supervision.) Soon enough, however, it was realized that although the sparrows did consume grain, they also destroyed many harmful insects which, left alive, inflicted far worse damage on the crops than did the birds. So the sparrows were rehabilitated. Rehabilitation, however, did not return them to life any more than it had the victims of Stalin’s bloody purges, and the insects continued to feast on China’s crops. Meanwhile, however, we Russians watched the slaughter of the sparrows with disgust, and those whose names were Vorobyov (which means “sparrow”), or Mukhin (“fly”), or Komarov (“gnat”)—very common Russian names—gloomily joked about the mortal danger that threatened them.

— Translated by Andrew MacAndrew, Soviet Scientist in Red China (1964)

Rocket scientist Qian Xuesen, mathematician Hua Luogeng, writer Ba Jin and other high-profile experts actively participated in the sparrow-hunting campaign. The People's Daily reported at the time that more than 2,000 scientists and staff members of the Chinese Academy of Sciences participated in the "battle". An incomplete statistical count found that more than 200 million sparrows were killed nationwide in 1958, and according to statistics from the National Patriotic Health Campaign Committee Office, about 2.11 billion were killed. As a result, by the spring of 1959, the leaves on both sides of the streets in many Chinese cities had been almost completely eaten by pests. Mao Zedong persisted in describing sparrows as a pest bird, saying in a speech at the Lushan Conference on July 10, 1959: "Some people say the Four Pests campaign is no longer effective and has been relaxed. Sparrows have become a major problem and still need to be eliminated."

On January 8, 1956, Tso-hsin Cheng, renowned Chinese ornithologist and researcher at the Institute of Zoology in the Chinese Academy of Sciences, published a lengthy article titled "The Harm of Sparrows and How to Eliminate Them" in the People's Daily. Later, he also compiled pamphlets such as "How to Prevent and Eliminate Sparrows" and "Preventing Sparrow Damage". However, Tso-hsin Cheng had reservations about the idea of exterminating sparrows, stating that the issue of their harms and benefits should not be treated uniformly. He suggested that different seasons, regions, and environments should be taken into account when addressing the problem.

=== End of campaign ===
After the 1959 Lushan Conference, Mao Zedong launched the Anti-Right Deviation Struggle, demanding that the whole country "oppose right-leaning tendencies and boost morale" to achieve a greater leap forward.

Nevertheless, Zhu Xi, director of the Institute of Experimental Biology of the Chinese Academy of Sciences (who had almost been labeled a rightist in the 1957 Anti-Rightist Movement), Feng Depei, a researcher at the Institute of Physiology of the Chinese Academy of Sciences, neurophysiologist Zhang Xiangtong, and other scientists demanded that sparrows be "rehabilitated." On November 27, 1959, Zhang Jingfu, secretary of the Party Group of the Chinese Academy of Sciences, wrote a report to Mao on the issue of sparrows, incorporating the views of national and foreign scientists. The report was forwarded to Mao Zedong by Hu Qiaomu, and Mao Zedong approved it two days later, saying that "Zhang Jingfu's report should be distributed to all comrades." Following the arrangements of the Party Group of the Chinese Academy of Sciences, the Biological Division of the Chinese Academy of Sciences held symposiums on the issue of sparrows on December 29, 1959, and January 9, 1960, to plan the establishment of a "Sparrow Research Coordination Group" that would conduct research on sparrows' benefits and harms. Subsequently, a coordination group composed of personnel from relevant state organs and numerous research units, headed by Tong Dizhou, director of the Biological Division of the Chinese Academy of Sciences, was formally established on March 4, 1960.

On March 18, 1960, Mao Zedong wrote "Instructions of the CCP Central Committee on Health Work", stating: "Stop killing sparrows, and replace them with bedbugs. The slogan is 'Eliminate rats, bedbugs, flies, and mosquitoes'." On April 10, 1960, the Second Session of the 2nd National People's Congress discussed the "Revised Draft of the Outline" produced in October 1957, which changed Article 27 on eliminating the four pests to "Starting in 1956, within twelve years, rats, bedbugs, flies, and mosquitoes should be eliminated in all possible places." This marked the official end of the Eliminate Sparrows campaign.

== Sparrow extermination ==
In an attempt to accomplish the significant task of changing the ecological order, Mao mobilized the Chinese population aged five and above. Similar to a coordinated military campaign, schoolchildren would disperse into the countryside at a specific hour to hunt sparrows. A firsthand account from a former Sichuan schoolchild at the time of the campaign recounted, "It was fun to 'Wipe out the Four Pests'. The whole school went to kill sparrows. We made ladders to knock down their nests, and beat gongs in the evenings, when they were coming home to roost." In Beijing, the People's Daily reported "Every morning and from 4:00 p.m. to 7:30 p.m., when sparrows were out of their nests and returning to their nests, citizens would work together to chase them". To organize and promote the campaign, meetings were held and propaganda posters, leaflets, films and jingles were created. Contributing to the campaign was seen as a citizen's patriotic duty.

Methods of eliminating sparrows included catching them by hand; using glue traps, net traps, and other traps; using poisoned bait; and attacking them with poles. Sparrow nests were destroyed, eggs were broken, and chicks were killed. Many people organized into groups and banged loud objects together to prevent sparrows from resting in their nests, with the goal of causing them to drop dead through sheer fatigue. Tools employed included wire clamps, wire cages, bamboo poles, red flags, firecrackers, stones, slingshots, gongs, megaphones, washbasins, air guns, and scarecrows. Citizens shot the birds down from the sky with slingshots or guns. The campaign depleted the sparrow population, pushing it to near extinction within China.

Some sparrows found a refuge in the extraterritorial premises of various diplomatic missions in China. The personnel of the Polish embassy in Beijing denied the Chinese request to enter the embassy premises and scare away the sparrows who were hiding there, and as a result the embassy was surrounded by people with drums. After two days of constant drumming, the Poles had to use shovels to clear the embassy of dead sparrows.

== Impact ==
=== Ecological disaster ===
Millions of sparrows were killed. While the campaign was meant to increase yields, concurrent droughts and floods as well as the lacking sparrow population decreased rice yields. The extermination of sparrows upset the ecological balance, which subsequently resulted in surging locust and other insect populations that destroyed crops due to a lack of a natural predator.

With no sparrows to eat them, locust populations ballooned, swarming the country and compounding the ecological problems already caused by the Great Leap Forward, including widespread deforestation and misuse of poisons and pesticides. Although sparrows were removed from the Four Pests in 1960, the disruption of ecological balance, combined with errors in food distribution policies and the exaggeration of crop production figures, led to the Great Chinese Famine. According to a 2025 study, the anti-sparrow campaign accounted for a nearly 20 percent drop in crop production, leading to the deaths of two million people.

By the end of the Four Pests campaign, the Eurasian tree sparrow was practically extinct from China, which afterwards imported 250,000 Eurasian tree sparrows from the Soviet Union to recover its population.

=== Persecution of scientists ===
The Cultural Revolution broke out in 1966. Although scientist Zhu Xi, who had prominently opposed the Eliminate Sparrows campaign, had died in 1962, he was still accused of publicly opposing Mao. As a result, his grave was desecrated, and his bones were exhumed by Red Guards. Ornithologist Tso-hsin Cheng, who had also expressed reservations about the Eliminate Sparrows campaign, was also accused of using the issue to oppose Chairman Mao, the Great Leap Forward, and Mao's supreme instructions, among other crimes, and was subjected to brutal struggle sessions.

== In popular culture ==
- "The Sparrow Shall Fall" is a 1959 short story about the Eliminate Sparrows campaign, written by Chinese-born author Han Suyin and published in The New Yorker.
- Every Red Heart Shines Toward the Red Sun is a 2006 instrumental post-rock album by the U.S. band Red Sparowes about the Eliminate Sparrows campaign and Great Chinese Famine.
- Smash Sparrow is a 2023 poem by Indian poet Vinita Agrawal about the Eliminate Sparrows campaign and Great Chinese Famine, published in the Indian Literature literary journal.
- Sparrows is a 2008 poem by U.S. poet Victoria Chang about the Eliminate Sparrows campaign, published in The Kenyon Review.

== See also ==
- Four Pests campaign
- Great Leap Forward
- People's commune
- Backyard furnace
- Great Chinese Famine
- Cultural Revolution
- British pet massacre
- Emu War
