= Frank Dikötter =

Dutch historian (b. 1961)

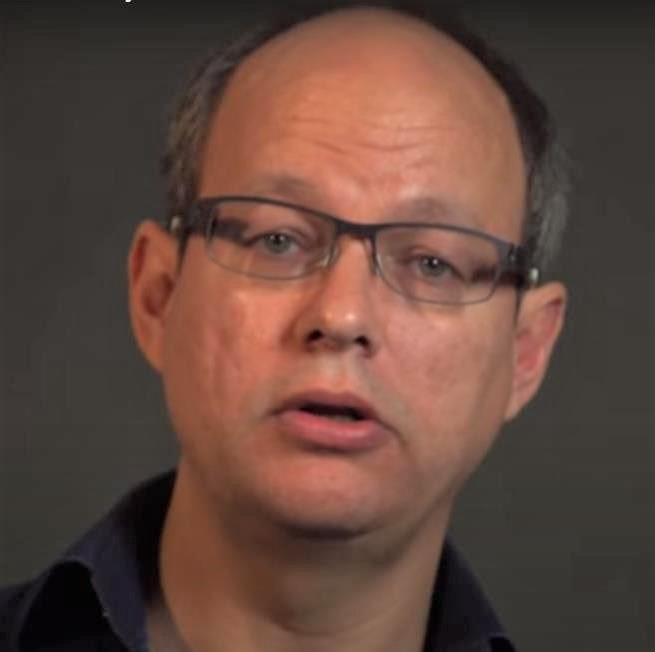
- Dikötter in 2013
- Born: 30 November 1961 (age 64); Stein, Netherlands
- Occupations: Professor; author
- Awards: Samuel Johnson Prize (2011)

Academic background
- Education: University of Geneva (BA, MA); SOAS University of London (PhD)

Academic work
- Discipline: History
- Sub-discipline: Modern Chinese history
- Institutions: University of Hong Kong; Hoover Institution
- Notable works: The People's Trilogy
- Website: frankdikotter.com

Frank Dikötter (/diːˈkʌtər/; Chinese: 馮客; pinyin: Féng Kè, born 1961) is a Dutch historian who specialises in modern China. Dikötter is the author of The People's Trilogy, which consists of Mao's Great Famine (2010), The Tragedy of Liberation (2013), and The Cultural Revolution (2016). This series examines China under the Chinese Communist Party (CCP).

== Life ==
Born in the Netherlands, Dikötter graduated from the University of Geneva in Switzerland, majoring in history and Russian language. After two years in China, he moved to England, where he obtained his PhD in history from the School of Oriental and African Studies (SOAS) at the University of London in 1990. He stayed at SOAS as British Academy Postdoctoral Fellow and as Wellcome Research Fellow, before being promoted to a personal chair as Professor of the Modern History of China in 2002. Since 2006, Dikötter has been Chair Professor of Humanities at the University of Hong Kong. He holds an honorary doctorate from Leiden University and is a senior fellow of the Hoover Institution at Stanford University in California, United States.

== Work ==
=== Patient Zero and Narcotic Culture ===
In Patient Zero (2003) and Narcotic Culture (2004), Dikötter posits that the effects of the prohibition of opium on the Chinese people led to greater harm than the effects of the drug itself.

Historian Kathleen L. Lodwick criticized this book as "one of the revisionist histories of which there have been several lately that have aimed at convincing us that imperialism wasn't all that bad, or at least that we should not blame the imperialists, in this case the opium traders who made vast fortunes from the trade, for the social problems they created. Closer attention to accuracy in the bibliography would have caught some errors, which appear more than once and so are not simply typos." Alan Baumler wrote in his review of Narcotic Culture, "the authors' unwillingness to engage with the secondary literature, poor conceptualization, and questionable use of evidence make the study less useful than it could be." Timothy Brook argued that the authors of Narcotic Culture "float some extraordinary propositions that go not only beyond received wisdom, but beyond actual evidence and even common sense."

=== The People's Trilogy ===
Dikötter talking about The Tragedy of Liberation in 2013

Dikötter is the author of The People's Trilogy, three books that document the effects of the ruling Communist Party on the lives of ordinary Chinese people on the basis of new archival material. The first volume, titled Mao's Great Famine, won the 2011 Samuel Johnson Prize (now called the Baillie Gifford Prize) for nonfiction, Britain's most prestigious book award for non-fiction, in 2010. The second installment, The Tragedy of Liberation: A History of the Chinese Revolution, 1945–1957, was shortlisted for the Orwell Prize in 2014, losing out to This Boy by Alan Johnson. The Cultural Revolution: A People's History, 1962–1976, concludes the trilogy and was shortlisted for the PEN International Hessell-Tiltman Prize in 2017.

Mao's Great Famine is a 2010 book about the Great Chinese Famine. The book was well received and won the Samuel Johnson Prize in 2011. Pankaj Mishra described Dikötter's work as "boldly and engagingly revisionist" in his article for The New Yorker, leading to a public dispute between the two. Roderick MacFarquhar said that Mao's Great Famine is "Pathbreaking ... a first-class piece of research. ... [Mao] will be remembered as the ruler who initiated and presided over the worst man-made human catastrophe ever. His place in Chinese history is assured. Dikötter's book will have done much to put him there." Felix Wemheuer, lecturer in Chinese history and politics at the University of Vienna, criticized Dikötter for his book's lack of explanation of local variations in destruction and death toll, his ignorance of Mao's efforts to deal with the problems, and his lack of sophisticated arguments due to his political agenda: to reduce Chinese Communism to terror. Economic historian Cormac Ó Gráda criticised the book as "more like a catalogue of anecdotes about atrocities than a sustained analytic argument", and stated that it failed to note that "many of the horrors it describes were recurrent features of Chinese history during the previous century or so." Anthony Garnaut, a social historian of China, said that Dikötter's juxtaposition and sampling techniques fall short of academic best practice, and the allegations Dikötter levels at Yang Jisheng's work are bewildering. In Garnaut's view, Dikötter selectively uses Yang's archival research to tell "an idiosyncratic vignette of totalitarian folly" without historical context. Garnaut also mentioned Dikötter's neglect of the plain wording of the archival document on which he hangs his case. According to Andrew G. Walder, Dikötter's high death estimate cannot be reconciled with age-specific population data.

The Tragedy of Liberation examines the establishment and first decade of the People's Republic of China. In the book, Dikötter describes the early years of the state as an era of "calculated terror and systematic violence". For Financial Times, Julia Lovell wrote that "[a] remarkable work of archival research. Dikötter rarely, if ever, allows the story of central government to dominate by merely reporting a top-down directive. Instead, he tracks the grassroots impact of Communist policies – on farmers, factory workers, industrialists, students, monks – by mining archives and libraries for reports, surveys, speeches and memoirs. In so doing, he uncovers astonishing stories of party-led inhumanity and also popular resistance." For The Guardian, historian Rana Mitter wrote that The Tragedy of Liberation is an "excellent book" that is "horrific but essential reading for all who want to understand the darkness that lies at the heart of one of the world's most important revolutions". Mitter also wrote that it is "an angry book, but its fury is always contained within a framework of impressive research and elegant prose". In his review, Felix Wemheuer wrote, "Dikötter is retelling an old story about the early years of the Cold War based on new sources. While many journalists celebrate The Tragedy of Liberation in their reviews, most Western historians, political scientists, and sociologists offer a much more complicated version of early PRC history that includes diverse experiences and local variations. Finding credible alternative narratives is a huge task that warrants future research by modern China scholars. Unfortunately, Dikötter's condemning of the Chinese revolution in his People's Trilogy requires an academic response that consists of more than a few novel local case studies." Brian DeMare has criticized Dikötter's The Tragedy of Liberation for implying that landlords were a communist-invented fiction. DeMare writes, "Due to Dikötter's choice of phrasing, many readers believe that he is arguing that there were no landlords in China. His citation, however, refers to my UCLA dissertation, where I discuss how the term land lord (dizhu) was an alien word in the countryside [...] There were, to be sure, many landlords in China."

The Cultural Revolution provides an account of China's Cultural Revolution. In her review for The Guardian, Julia Lovell called it an extension of Mao's Last Revolution by Roderick MacFarquhar and Michael Schoenhals, with more intensive use of evidence drawn from China's local archives, and an excavation of the unintended socioeconomic consequences of the Cultural Revolution, including the growth of a private economy. Daniel Leese pointed out four issues about the book: lack of analysis or explanation of many local examples within their particular environment, lack of comprehensive analysis on causes and effects, problematic neglect of the role of ideology in Mao Zedong's launch of the Cultural Revolution, and a lack of clarity between analytical concepts and party language. In his review of the book, Fabio Lanza wrote that Dikötter repeatedly made controversial statements without providing sufficient evidence, and he described events with salacious, if very dubious, details. Lanza concluded that Dikötter's work "does not add anything to our understanding of the Cultural Revolution. Rather, as a mass-marketed assessment of the period, it goes against a long-standing effort in the field of PRC history to produce nuanced, well-sourced, complex, historically rich, and truly innovative analyses." In his review, Ian Johnson wrote about Dikötter's lack of nuance and the absence of grounding for his contrarian views (for example, Dikötter wrote that literacy and public health decreased during the Mao period).

Mao Zedong's biographer Philip Short wrote that "Dikötter's errors are strangely consistent. They all serve to strengthen his case against Mao and his fellow leaders." In reference to Dikötter's errors and misleading comments, Short said the main problem with the author's book was that it did not offer a credible explanation of why Mao and his colleagues acted as they did. Short posited that Dikötter's book "set out to make the case for the prosecution, rather than providing balanced accounts of the periods they describe."

== Awards ==
- 2011: Samuel Johnson Prize for Mao's Great Famine
- 2017: honorary doctorate from Leiden University

== List of works ==
- 1992: The Discourse of Race in Modern China – digital edition
- 1995: Sex, Culture and Modernity in China: Medical Science and the Construction of Sexual Identities in the Early Republican Period
- 1997: The Construction of Racial Identities in China and Japan
- 1998: Imperfect Conceptions: Medical Knowledge, Birth Defects and Eugenics in China
- 2002: Crime, Punishment and the Prison in Modern China
- 2003: Patient Zero: China and the Myth of the Opium Plague – digital edition
- 2004: Narcotic Culture: A History of Drugs in China
- 2007: Exotic Commodities: Modern Objects and Everyday Life in China
- 2008: The Age of Openness: China Before Mao
- 2010: Mao's Great Famine: The History of China's Most Devastating Catastrophe, 1958–1962
- 2013: The Tragedy of Liberation: A History of the Chinese Revolution, 1945–1957
- 2016: The Cultural Revolution: A People's History, 1962–1976
- 2019: How to Be a Dictator: The Cult of Personality in the Twentieth Century
- 2022: China After Mao: The Rise of a Superpower
- 2026: Red Dawn Over China: How Communism Conquered a Quarter of Humanity

== See also ==
- Cultural Revolution
- Great Leap Forward
- History of the People's Republic of China (1949–1976)
- Mao Zedong
