= The Cultural Revolution: A People's History, 1962–1976 =

2016 book by Frank Dikötter

- Cover of the 2016 first edition
- Author: Frank Dikötter
- Language: English
- Genre: History
- Publisher: Bloomsbury Press
- Publication date: 2016
- Media type: Print (hardcover)
- Pages: 452
- ISBN: 978-1-63286-421-5

The Cultural Revolution: A People's History, 1962–1976 is a book by University of Hong Kong historian Frank Dikötter. It is the third book in a trilogy about the history of China under Mao Zedong, based on newly opened government archives, particularly on previously classified party documents from secret police reports and unexpurgated versions of leadership speeches, as well as on interviews and memoirs. Dikötter's first book in the series, Mao's Great Famine, covered the period of the Great Leap Forward, whereas The Tragedy of Liberation examines the establishment and first decade of the People's Republic of China.

After the failure of the Great Leap Forward, Mao Zedong launched the Cultural Revolution to restore his reputation and eliminate perceived threats. Aimed at purging capitalist and bourgeois elements, it mobilized youth into Red Guards who initially supported Mao but soon turned on each other violently. The resulting chaos led to military intervention, transforming China into a militarised state and triggering large-scale purges in which as many as one in fifty people were crushed. In the book, Dikötter discusses the causes and consequences of the Cultural Revolution and provides a crucial reminder of the tragedies, miscalculations and human costs of Mao's last experiment.

== Reception ==
In her review for The Guardian, Julia Lovell, a professor of modern chinese history, called it an extension of Mao's Last Revolution by Roderick MacFarquhar and Michael Schoenhals, with more intensive use of evidence drawn from China's local archives, and an excavation of the unintended socioeconomic consequences of the Cultural Revolution, including the growth of a private economy. According to Lovell, a second important element of the book is that the unintended socioeconomic consequences of the Cultural Revolution was that "a purge launched to preserve the anti-capitalist 'purity' of Mao's revolution had the opposite effect."

Sinologist Daniel Leese pointed out four issues about the book: lack of analysis or explanation of many local examples within their particular environment, lack of comprehensive analysis on causes and effects, problematic neglect of the role of ideology in Mao Zedong's launch of the Cultural Revolution, and a lack of clarity between analytical concepts and party language. Leese posited the book as "well-readable account of the Cultural Revolution for a broad audience that offers new perspectives, which are definitely worthwhile pondering, although probably not all of the proposed answers will hold up."

In his review of the book, Fabio Lanza, a cultural historian of twentieth-century China, wrote that Dikötter repeatedly made controversial statements without providing sufficient evidence, and he described events with salacious, if very dubious, details. Lanza concluded that Dikötter's work "does not add anything to our understanding of the Cultural Revolution. Rather, as a mass-marketed assessment of the period, it goes against a long-standing effort in the field of PRC history to produce nuanced, well-sourced, complex, historically rich, and truly innovative analyses."

Felix Wemheuer viewed the book as the best in Dikötter's trilogy. He noted that Dikötter is careful with estimations of victims than in the other two volumes. Wemheuer noted that Dikötter showed "a large expansion of rural black markets, underground factories, private plots, and production of cash crops," which Dikötter called the "silent revolution." Wemheuer believed that Dikötter exaggerated in his argument, not providing adequate evidence. Wemheuer wrote that People's History "often overemphasizes resistance and underestimates accommodation, adaptation, acquiescence, apathy, opportunism, and support for the regime." and he wrote "[a] more balanced history of Maoist China from below remains to be written."

In his review, Ian Johnson wrote about Dikötter's lack of nuance and the absence of grounding for his contrarian views (for example, Dikötter wrote that literacy and public health decreased during the Mao period).

The journalist Philip Short, who wrote a biography and presented a TV documentary on Mao Zedong entitled Mao's Bloody Revolution Revealed, wrote that "Dikötter's errors are strangely consistent. They all serve to strengthen his case against Mao and his fellow leaders." In reference to Dikötter's errors and misleading comments, Short said the main problem with the author's book was that it did not offer a credible explanation of why Mao and his colleagues acted as they did. Short posited that Dikötter's book "set out to make the case for the prosecution, rather than providing balanced accounts of the periods they describe."
