= The Age of Openness =

2008 book by Frank Dikötter

The Age of Openness: China Before Mao
- Author: Frank Dikötter
- Language: English
- Genre: History
- Publisher: University of Hong Kong Press (paperback)
- Publication date: 15 July 2008
- Pages: 140
- ISBN: 978-0-520-25881-5

The Age of Openness: China Before Mao is a 2008 book by historian Frank Dikötter. It provides an account of the history of the Republic of China, spanning from the early 20th century to the Chinese Communist Party takeover in 1949. Dikötter describes a period of unprecedented openness during which China was actively pursuing engagement with the world, as evidenced by what he described as a pluralistic intellectual environment, thriving open markets and economic growth, and expanded liberties and rule of law.

== Content ==
In the book, Dikötter challenged conventional historical narratives on China during the Republican period, an era that has traditionally been represented as a catastrophic time marred by famine, invasions, civil war, and instability, the backwardness of which was only corrected with the triumph of the Communists in 1949. As Bradley Winterton of the Taipei Times wrote, Dikötter presents evidence that China during this era was "for a time at least, more democratic than many comparable countries in Europe (and almost everywhere else in Asia), less militarized per head of the population than might be supposed, with considerable stability and continuity in local government even if the central government was weak, and with a remarkably international perspective."

While Dikötter does not deny the devastation caused by the Chinese Civil War or the Second Sino-Japanese War, he nonetheless argues that the Republican period was a "golden age of openness" in which the country was making substantial progress toward modernity, boldly experimenting with ideas and market reforms, and building vast infrastructure projects.

== Reception ==
Historian Jonathan Spence wrote that The Age of Openness "presents a cornucopia of graphic examples to show that China in the first half of the twentieth century, far from being in a state of decay that called for revolutionary action, was in fact a vibrant and cosmopolitan society. In such a reading, the current Chinese leaders should not be seen as striving to do something bold and new; they are merely struggling to rebuild a network of global connections that Mao and others had systematically helped to destroy."

Andrew J. Nathan, professor of political science at Columbia University, wrote that Dikötter's book "infuses new life into an historical period left by most historians for dead—China's republican era from 1912 to 1949. In his persuasive recounting, this cosmopolitan, dynamic era has more to tell us about modern China's long-term trajectory than the authoritarian interlude that followed it."

Journalist Jonathan Fenby argues that while Dikötter sometimes built his cases on fragile foundations, he nevertheless "marshals a good case that China in this period was much more vibrant, innovative and open than has been generally supposed."

== See also ==
- Culture of the Republican era in China
- Mao's Great Famine
- Republic of China (1912–1949)
