= Macau, City of Commerce and Culture =

1987 text edited by R. D. Cremer

Macau, City of Commerce and Culture is a 1987 collection edited by R. D. Cremer and originally published by University of East Asia (UEA) Press, now the University of Macau Press. A second edition was published by API Press in 1991. The book discusses aspects of Macau. The second edition, subtitled "Continuity and Change", has additional content, with the editor stating that the second edition focuses on the concept of Macau keeping its heritage while adjusting to the modern world. Bruce Taylor stated in his review of the second edition for The China Quarterly that it is useful for both specialists and for general readers.

== Background ==
The book originated from a UEA symposium. The authors come from various countries.

== Contents ==
The original edition of the book has three sections: "Origins and History," "Culture and Language," and "Commerce and Constitution," altogether having 13 chapters. The second edition has one more section, with the government and educational content being a separate chapter from its economic content. This edition has eight additional chapters, increasing the page length by almost 100%.

== Reception ==
Frank Leeming, in his review of the first edition for The China Quarterly, stated that it was "A most welcome book" and that he particularly liked chapters discussing Macau's architecture, landscaping, and visual arts. He stated "it is not surprising if the scope of individual chapters varies considerably; and the same may be said of their quality."

G. V. Scammell of Pembroke College, Cambridge University, stated that the first edition "is hardly the definitive account of Macau's long and colourful past, but it makes a useful introduction, particularly for any intending visitor."

Taylor stated in his review of the second edition that "There are undoubtedly some gems in this collection" with some of the second-edition exclusive essays being "some of the most enlightening". Taylor stated "one or two [chapters] are merely pedestrian" while some others "are workmanlike rather than inspired" despite their informational value.
