= Run and Hide =

Run and Hide may refer to:

- "Run & Hide" (The Automatic song), a 2010 song by The Automatic
- "Run & Hide" (Gracia Baur song), a 2005 song by Gracia Baur
- "Run and Hide", a song by Algebra from Purpose
- "Run and Hide", a song by Anna Chalon
- "Run and Hide", a song by Blackfoot from Strikes
- "Run and Hide", a song by Jay Electronica
- "Run and Hide", a song by The Uniques
- "Run and Hide", a song by Sabrina Carpenter from Evolution
- "Run and Hide (The Gun Song)", a song by Status Quo from Bula Quo!
- Run and Hide (novel), by Pankaj Mishra
