= While Israel Slept =

2025 book

While Israel Slept: How Hamas Surprised the Most Powerful Military in the Middle East
- Author: Yaakov Katz , Amir Bohbot
- Language: English
- Genre: Israel & Palestine history, Middle Eastern politics,
- Publisher: St. Martin's Press
- Publication date: September, 2025
- Publication place: Israel
- Pages: 336
- ISBN: 978-1250345684

While Israel Slept is a narrative book that details how Hamas managed to execute its unexpected assault on the Israeli military on October 7. The book explores the occurrences of October 7, 2023, revealing failures in intelligence and strategy. The author highlights erroneous intelligence assessments, flawed policies, and the deficiencies in Israel's military and political leadership in the days preceding the October 7 conflict. While Israel Slept adopts a critical perspective on Israel's intelligence services, its political leaders, and Benjamin Netanyahu.

== Authors ==
The book is authored by Yaakov Katz, who previously served as the editor in chief of the Jerusalem Post, and Amir Bohbot, a military and defense correspondent for Vala, which is an Israeli news website. Sources in the Israeli military and intelligence services helped the two authors document this book.

== Content ==
While Israel Slept is structured into six chapters, along with an introduction and a conclusion. These sections address the sequence of events, the enduring apprehension regarding Gaza, the tunnels, the narrative of Hamas's ascent, the response of the Israeli military, and the matter of compensating Hamas to maintain peace.

Naturally, the book does not adhere to a neutral stance, and the authors provide particular suggestions aimed at enhancing Israel's security conditions and diplomatic initiatives. The authors of the book contend that Netanyahu's significant error was concentrating all his efforts on gearing up for conflict with Iran and Hezbollah, prioritizing the elimination of Iran's nuclear arsenal as his main objective. Conversely, he perceived Hamas as a negligible threat that could be appeased through financial means.

One example mentioned in the book regarding Israel's unpreparedness is a portion of the 2023 Sukkot ceremony that took place at the IDF headquarters in Tel Aviv, which was attended by the prime minister. "Some of the attendees arrived at the IDF headquarters in Tel Aviv dressed in jeans and T-shirts," the authors note. These individuals made the decision to leave the border largely unprotected on October 7. As a result, either the female soldiers and the eighteen-year-olds stationed at the border without defensive weapons or even uniforms were either massacred or taken hostage by Hamas when the conflict erupted.

In a particular chapter, the authors elucidate the origins of Hamas, a faction that rapidly expanded to encompass thousands of militants and missiles. The two authors contend that Netanyahu perceived Hamas as a balancing force against Yasser Arafat and the Palestinian Authority, and he never intended to engage in negotiations with the group due to its radicalism.

In a section named "Tunnel Blindness," the authors describe how Hamas, while enhancing its sophisticated security system along the Israel-Zeit border, was simultaneously broadening its network of subterranean tunnels. In 2018, Defense Minister Avigdor Lieberman initiated Operation Thunder with the objective of eliminating Hamas tunnels. However, the Israeli military, along with Netanyahu's cabinet, made the decision to suspend the operation. The two authors claim: "His fear that members of his coalition might abandon the government caused him to delay decisions that could have expedited a hostage deal and cease-fire…allowing the war to extend unnecessarily."

== See Also ==
- The World After Gaza
- Crossing the Red Line
