= The Romantics (novel) =

1999 debut novel by Pankaj Mishra

- First edition (UK)
- Author: Pankaj Mishra
- Cover artist: Raghubir Singh
- Language: English
- Genre: Literary fiction
- Publisher: Picador
- Publication date: 1999
- Publication place: India, UK
- Pages: 277
- ISBN: 0-330-39277-8
- OCLC: 59510102

The Romantics (1999) is the debut novel of Pankaj Mishra, the author of Butter Chicken in Ludhiana: Travels in Small Town India (1995), An End to Suffering: The Buddha in the World (2004) and Temptations of the West: How to be Modern in India, Pakistan and Beyond (2006). The Romantics is an ironic tale of people longing for fulfillment in cultures other than their own. It was published in eleven European languages and won the Los Angeles Times Art Seidenbaum Award for First Fiction.

== Plot introduction ==
Samar, the young narrator of The Romantics, arrives at a boarding house in the holy city of Benaras, an ancient city trying to cope with modern India. There he hopes to lose himself in books and solitude, but, far from offering him an undistracted existence, the city forces all his silent desires into the light. Although this novels depicts the interaction of two culture such as east and west. the protagonist is highly attracted towards the glamour of western that comes to novel as being in contact with Catherine.

== Literary significance and reception ==
'Though slightly over-long and crowded with minor players, The Romantics is an intriguing combination of casual grace and emotional intensity, peppered with discreet social comment on caste, class, sectarian strife, the state of the nation. (...) Hearteningly different from the tricksiness and posturing of much recent Indian writing, this is a charming début, which makes a virtue of its studied simplicity' – Aamer Hussein, The Independent

'If much of cosmopolitan Indian writing has valorized the immigrant and the foreign land, then The Romantics is a celebration of the home and its forgotten world' – Amitava Kumar, The Nation

'...this extraordinary debut novel, The Romantics, a supernova in the wan firmament of recent fiction' – Marie Arana, The Washington Post
