= China After Mao (book) =

2022 book by Frank Dikötter

China After Mao: The Rise of a Superpower
- Author: Frank Dikötter
- Language: English
- Subject: Geopolitics; China
- Genre: Nonfiction
- Published: 29 September 2022
- Publisher: Bloomsbury Publishing
- Publication place: United Kingdom
- Media type: Paperback
- Pages: 416
- ISBN: 978-1526660541

China After Mao: The Rise of a Superpower is a non-fiction book by Frank Dikötter, a Dutch historian. The book discusses China's "unprecedented economic transformation" over the past four decades, which catapulted the country from having the 12th largest economy in the world to having the second-largest economy in the world. He analyses China's response to the 2008 financial crisis, its growing hostility towards what it perceives as Western interference, and China's evolution into a deeply entrenched dictatorship, complete with an expansive security apparatus and the most advanced surveillance system in the world.

== Reception ==
In his review at the Financial Times, Jonathan Fenby writes, "Some elements of the book are open to debate, such as Dikötter’s downplaying of the private sector, which has provided most of the growth and job creation, even if it is kept on a tight rein and often depends on state contacts. But, China After Mao provides an important corrective to the conventional view of China’s rise through reform."

Writing for The Hindu, G Venkat Raman, a professor of humanities and social sciences at the Indian Institute of Management Indore writes, "Dikötter does not talk about the impact of the emergence of these influential private players in an authoritarian party-state like China. Second, given that the book was published in 2022, the author has not done justice to the coverage of the Xi Jinping-era."
