= Crossing the Red Line =

2026 book by Akbar Shahid Ahmed

- Official book cover
- Author: Akbar Shahid Ahmed
- Language: English
- Genre: Human Rights Law
- Publisher: W. W. Norton & Company
- Publication date: 2026
- Publication place: United States
- Pages: 368
- ISBN: 978-1324118190

Crossing the Red Line: Biden, His Advisors, and Israel's War in Gaza is an account of the role of the Joe Biden administration in atrocities in the Gaza War, from foreign affairs journalist Akbar Shahid Ahmed. According to Ahmed, the Biden administration's disregard for both domestic and international law, emotional identification with Israel, and dehumanization of Palestinians combined to help commit the Gaza genocide.

Ahmed is the senior diplomatic correspondent at HuffPost. His reporting on Gaza earned him a Writers Guild Award and a New York Press Club Award, and been named a finalist for the Livingston Award.

== Background ==
Three years after the Gaza war, journalist Akbar Shahid Ahmed has compiled an account of events spanning October 7, 2023, to January 2025, focusing on the decisions made by the Biden administration. This narrative is based on interviews with 150 officials and others involved in the events and suggests the Biden administration is unwilling to limit Israel's actions in Gaza despite evidence of possible war crimes. It noted a pattern of insularity among Biden and his close circle, who seem unresponsive to other experts.

== Content ==
The author believes that President Biden should ha Following Hamas’s attack on October 7, Israel responded with violence in Gaza, claiming to target militants but also hitting hospitals, schools, and homes. Journalist Akbar Shahid Ahmed reports how the Biden administration supported Israeli Prime Minister Benjamin Netanyahu, disregarding experts' warnings and involving Americans in potential war crimes. The U.S. did little to help hostages or protect innocent Palestinians, even as protests increased. President Biden denied supporting Netanyahu completely but warned against assaults in Rafah, where over 1 million Palestinians were sheltering. Despite this, the U.S. continued to supply Israeli weapons. The reasons for this support were a desire to avoid disrupting the status quo and a lack of trust in Palestinian casualty figures. Ahmed's work highlights the administration's failures and their long-term global impact.

Based on the author's inquiries, Israel denies committing war crimes; however, there were deliberations among figures such as cabinet members, Brett McGurk (Middle East coordinator), and Jack Lew (U.S. Ambassador to Israel), ultimately resulting in a reliance on "collective immunity" to ensure no single individual is held culpable.

In this book, the author reveals that National Security Advisor Jake Sullivan doubted the existence of famine among Palestinians in Gaza, a claim denied by his spokesperson. A senior State Department official indicated that, at that time, fewer than five U.S. officials were regularly communicating with Palestinians. The author states that within two years, Joe Biden significantly changed the U.S. role in the Israeli-Palestinian conflict and possibly reshaped American foreign policy. The author argues that the Biden administration's approach to Gaza has made the world more dangerous and raises concerns about democratic accountability in foreign affairs.

The author criticizes the administration for its inhumane and ineffective approach regarding Palestinian deaths. He points to the short-lived improvement in aid delivery following the killing of aid workers by the Israeli military, and the subsequent reversion to harmful policies.

== See also ==
- While Israel Slept
- The World After Gaza
