= Age of Anger =

Book by Indian author Pankaj Mishra

- First edition (UK)
- Author: Pankaj Mishra
- Language: English
- Genre: Nonfiction
- Publisher: Farrar, Straus, and Giroux (US); Allen Lane (UK); Juggernaut Books
- Publication date: 2017
- Media type: Print (hardback)
- Pages: 416
- ISBN: 978-0-374-27478-8

Age of Anger: A History of the Present is a 2017 nonfiction book by Indian author Pankaj Mishra. Mishra accounts for the resurgence of reactionary and right-wing political movements in the late 2010s. He argues that nationalist, isolationist, and chauvinist movements, ranging from terror groups such as ISIS to political movements such as Brexit, have emerged in response to the globalization and normalization of Western ideals such as individualism, capitalism, and secularism.

== Thesis ==
Mishra notes that disorder and violence naturally accompanied the coming of industrial capitalism in the Western world, citing events such as the French Revolution, the Revolutions of 1848, and two World Wars. He argues that the rest of the world is now undergoing that same series of shocks and that new tensions resulting from the Enlightenment are not yet resolved even in Europe. He criticizes the view that early-twentieth-century strife was an aberration interrupting a long history of steady progress and increasing prosperity, instead arguing that disorder is endemic to modernity. In the first half of the book Mishra dwells on the dispute between philosophers Voltaire and Jean-Jacques Rousseau, who lived during the eighteenth century when Enlightenment ideals and economic, political, and social liberalism began gaining momentum in Europe. According to Mishra, Rousseau was among those who best anticipated the problems modernity would bring: rootlessness, competition, and materialism.

Mishra presents this theory in opposition to historical theories that tacitly ascribe mostly positive attributes to modern liberalism such as Fukuyama's The End of History, which argues that liberal democracy has irrevocably become a global ideal, and Huntington's Clash of Civilizations theory, which Mishra argues encourages Islamophobia while obscuring the true causes of religious terrorism.

== Reception ==
Critics praised the book's erudition, noting Mishra's ambitious and timely argument relying on thinkers both well-known and obscure. Slate's Laura Miller stated, "The middle of the book could be heavy sledding for anyone lacking a passing familiarity with figures such as Fichte, Bakunin, and Kropotkin, but the chapters on how these European writers affected subsequent generations of leaders in India, Turkey, and China make it worth the effort." London's Literary Review called the book "absorbing," "richly learned," and "subversive."

Critiques of the book focused on Mishra's evidence, relying more on "novelists and poets than historians and sociologists," and on his attempt to use a single, wide-ranging cause to explain "differing phenomena that in the end require differing explanations." Franklin Foer of The New York Times Book Review stated, "It's bracing and illuminating for him to focus on feelings, what he calls 'the wars in the inner world.' But he doesn't have much to say about the material reality of economics and politics other than angry bromides about the 'Western model' and broad, unsupported statements about stagnation."
