= The World After Gaza =

2025 non-fiction book by Pankaj Mishra

The World After Gaza: A Short History
- Author: Pankaj Mishra
- Language: English
- Genre: Israel & Palestine history, Middle Eastern politics,
- Publisher: Penguin Press
- Publication date: February 2025
- Publication place: India
- Pages: 304
- ISBN: 979-8217058891

The World After Gaza: A Short History is a non-fiction book authored by Pankaj Mishra and published in February 2025. It contains themes such as Zionism, the Holocaust, antisemitism and philosemitism. The work is characterized by its personal, historical, philosophical and revolutionary elements. Mishra discusses the October 7 attacks, stating: "With this attack, Hamas challenged Israel's ongoing vulnerability". At the time of writing this book, a ceasefire had not yet been reached between Hamas and Israel. The book polarized reviewers, being praised by some and harshly criticized by others who found it overly or insufficiently critical of Israel.

== Author ==
Mishra's literary contributions include "The Age of Wrath: A Modern History", "From the Ruins of Empire: The Intellectuals Who Remade Asia", as well as various other nonfiction and fiction works. He is a contributor to The Guardian and the New York Review of Books, among other publications.

== Motivation ==
According to Charlie English, Mishra expresses his motivation for writing the book as a way to free himself from confusion and prevent a moral downfall. In this text, Misha explores history through the perspectives of race and decolonization.

As interpreted by Mishra Pankaj, Indian nationalism was influenced by the conviction that Gandhi and Nehru had witnessed the horrors faced by numerous Hindus, who suffered violence and sexual assault at the hands of British-supported Muslim separatists. Nevertheless, the literary works, authors, and playwrights who criticized nationalism had obscured this view in his mind until he traveled to the West Bank in 2008. There, he witnessed the plight of Palestinians living under Israeli military rule. "Their oppressors were once victims of the West," he writes, emphasizing the profound racial tensions he observed. The author originated from a nation that had undergone colonization. He remarked that the Palestinians, were "individuals like me, now living through the nightmares that my ancestors had left behind".

== Content ==
Mishra was deeply fascinated by Israeli heroes throughout his childhood, even displaying a picture of Moshe Dayan, the Israeli defense minister, on his wall. In 2008, he traveled to Israel and the West Bank, where he witnessed the hardships faced by the local residents. He describes Israel's actions as barbaric and is shocked by the suffering that Palestinians endure in their own homeland. Mishra draws comparisons between the experiences of Palestinians and Indians, observing that Indians fought against Western and white supremacist domination to secure their freedom many years ago. He believes that Palestinians are now beginning a similar struggle.

He argues that the extermination and incarceration of Asians and Africans arise from the ongoing maintenance of a global racial hierarchy upheld by Western powers. Mishra posits that the Eichmann trial in 1961 framed the Holocaust as a political matter associated with Zionism, thereby positioning Israel as the only entity capable of safeguarding the Jews' security. As a result, Israel depicted Arabs as collaborators in this genocide. This narrative has facilitated the normalization of Israel's oppression of Palestinians, permitting it to transpire without accountability. He claims that individuals around the globe label Israel as a colonial, settler, and Jewish supremacist regime, a characterization that receives backing from both Western liberals and extremists.

He authored this book to tackle two inquiries: How is it possible for a historically oppressed people to treat others so badly under Israeli rule? Additionally, how can the media in the West "ignore, even justify, its clearly systemic cruelties"? Mishra delves into the intellectual foundation that supports this undertaking, the tactics used to create a narrative, and the connection between the extensive suffering caused by the Shoah and the justification for the Israeli state's existence, as well as the systematic repression of any dissent against it.

Mishra describes a father holding the headless body of his son in Rafah. Even witnessing this from a distance, he notes, has inflicted "psychological suffering" on millions who have become "involuntary witnesses" to acts of "political evil". He enumerates the denial of access to food and medicine, the use of hot metal rods to torture naked prisoners, and the destruction of schools, universities, museums, churches, mosques, and even cemeteries, among other acts of violence perpetrated by Israel.

=== Shoah ===
Despite the restrictions on freedom of expression and regulations regarding anti-Semitism, Mishra emphasizes the importance of the Shoah in recent decades and opposition to antisemitism as a benchmark for civilization in the West. While discussing Zionist ideology, Mishra highlights the influence of intellectuals and writers from the 20th and 21st centuries in the context of the Gaza genocide. He reminds readers of the extent to which their psyches have been saturated with violence during the events of the October 7 war.

Mishra introduces the early emergence of Zionist thought and its entanglement with European ethnonationalist motives, arguing that this connection contributed to the rise of anti-Semitism.

== Style ==
According to Hamilton Cain and Stanly Johny, The World After Gaza is not centered on a single argument, nor is it solely composed of facts about history. Instead, it guides the reader from the Warsaw Ghetto Uprising of 1943 to the October 7 attacks, and from the West's racism and colonialism to the Israeli apartheid regime, featuring numerous quotations from such individuals as Hannah Arendt, Albert Einstein, Menachem Begin, Konrad Adenauer, Jean Améry, and Alfred Kazin. It resembles a stream-of-consciousness nonfiction novel.

== Publication and promotion ==
Mishra was scheduled to give a talk about the book at Oxford University, but it was cancelled. He gave an interview to Australian Broadcasting Corporation.

== Reception ==
Stanly Johny, writing for The Hindu, The World After Gaza reads like "a stream of consciousness novel in non-fiction", and the main argument is frequently lost. However, Johny suggests while the book offers very little insight into the world after Gaza, "it is a compelling read on the moral faultlines of a violent past and present". Sasha Frere-Jones harshly criticizes the book as "genteel Zionist distortion" and "a title that monetizes Israel's genocide, slapped onto a book that barely mentions it".

Turkish literature scholar Nagihan Haliloğlu writes that the one part of the book she disagrees with is the epilogue, where Mishra expresses pessimism about the future of Israel/Palestine and the world. For Hamilton Cain, writing in The Minnesota Star Tribune, the book is "a coolly argued polemic that sifts insights from the gore and chaos". According to Somak Ghoshal, the "powerful new book" is "backed by formidable research" and includes "razor-sharp analyses" about both the Gaza war and the foundation of Israel. In a review for Postmodern Culture, John Cox writes that "Few writers... have as thoroughly and uncompromisingly interrogated the instrumentalization of the Holocaust—and the still-lingering notion of 'Holocaust uniqueness'" as Mishra's "magnificent" book.

Charlie English, writing for The Guardian, called the book an "erudite yet flawed analysis", and Mark Rapport concluded that "While not without its flaws, this is brave writing that demands to be read". While The Wall Street Journal called it a "repugnant book" for being overly critical of Israel, Steve Donoghue in The Open Letters Review found it "monstrous" that Mishra suggested that the debate as to whether Israel acted in legitimate self defense would never be settled. A remark by Alvin Rosenfeld in Commentary summarizes the substance of several other negative reviews:

[Mishra] claims, an “orgy of bestial violence” on Israel’s part “challenges a fundamental assumption that human nature is intrinsically good [and] capable of empathy.” No one who has closely read Levi, Wiesel, and the various other writers Mishra cites would ever or could ever reasonably conclude that “human nature is intrinsically good.” It is not. The fact that it is not is one of the reasons Israel exists and must continue to exist.

== See also ==
- List of Indian writers
- While Israel Slept
- Crossing the Red Line
