= The Tragedy of Liberation =

2013 book by Frank Dikötter

The Tragedy of Liberation: A History of the Chinese Revolution 1945–1957
- Cover of the 2013 first edition
- Author: Frank Dikötter
- Language: English
- Genre: History
- Publisher: Bloomsbury Press
- Publication date: 24 September 2013
- Media type: Print (hardcover)
- Pages: 400
- ISBN: 978-1620403471

The Tragedy of Liberation: A History of the Chinese Revolution 1945–1957 is a book by University of Hong Kong historian Frank Dikötter. It is the second book in a trilogy about the history of China under Mao Zedong, based primarily on newly opened government archives, as well as on interviews and memoirs. Dikötter's first book in the series, Mao's Great Famine, covered the period of the Great Leap Forward, whereas The Tragedy of Liberation examines the establishment and first decade of the People's Republic of China.

In the book, Dikötter challenges the view that the early years of the People's Republic of China were constructive and relatively benign, at least as compared with the destruction of the preceding Chinese Civil War, or the subsequent Great Leap Forward; instead, he describes it as an era of "calculated terror and systematic violence", characterised by indoctrination, ill-conceived economic policies that stunted growth, the uprooting of traditional social relations, and officially mandated "death quotas" that contributed to the unnatural deaths of 5 million people within the first decade of the establishment of the republic.

== Publication ==
It was translated into Traditional Chinese by Xiao Ye (蕭葉 Xiāo Yè), published as 解放的悲劇：中國革命史1945-1957 by Linking Publishing Co. (聯經出版公司) of Taiwan.

== Reception ==
Following the success of his previous work on the Great Leap Forward, which won the Samuel Johnson Prize in 2011, The Tragedy of Liberation has garnered considerable attention. Writing for The Sunday Times, Michael Sheridan called it "groundbreaking ... unsparing in its detail, relentless in its research, unforgiving in its judgements." He added that the new evidence marshaled in Dikötter's work would significantly alter mainstream academic interpretations about the relevant period of China history, commenting: "In particular, volume 14 of the Cambridge History of China, which covers the period of this book, will have to be rewritten." Kirkus Reviews calls the book "a further catalog of horrors courtesy of Mao Zedong" and praises the book for its meticulous research.

For The Financial Times, Julia Lovell called it "[a] remarkable work of archival research. Dikötter rarely, if ever, allows the story of central government to dominate by merely reporting a top-down directive. Instead, he tracks the grassroots impact of Communist policies – on farmers, factory workers, industrialists, students, monks – by mining archives and libraries for reports, surveys, speeches and memoirs. In so doing, he uncovers astonishing stories of party-led inhumanity and also popular resistance." For The Guardian, Rana Mitter wrote that The Tragedy of Liberation is an "excellent book" which is "horrific but essential reading for all who want to understand the darkness that lies at the heart of one of the world's most important revolutions." Mitter also wrote that it is "an angry book, but its fury is always contained within a framework of impressive research and elegant prose".

Mark O'Neill of the South China Morning Post declared it to be "essential reading for anyone who wants to understand the nature and history of the communist state." In a book review for Human Rights in China, Roger Garside commented: "This book demolishes one of the last surviving myths about communist rule in China: that there was a 'Golden Era' from the time of 'liberation' in 1949 until the launch of the Great Leap Forward in 1958. For too many people outside China, the idea has prevailed for too long that this was a period when the Communist Party of China (CPC) ruled in a way that non-communists could respect."

In his review of The Tragedy of Liberation, Wemheuer wrote, "Dikötter is retelling an old story about the early years of the Cold War based on new sources. While many journalists celebrate The Tragedy of Liberation in their reviews, most Western historians, political scientists and sociologists offer a much more complicated version of early PRC history that includes diverse experiences and local variations. Finding credible alternative narratives is a huge task that warrants future research by modern China scholars. Unfortunately, Dikötter's condemning of the Chinese revolution in his People's Trilogy requires an academic response that consists of more than a few novel local case studies."

Historian Adam Cathcart has criticized Dikötter's misuse of sources in The Tragedy of Liberation, stating for example, "It may be that [Dikötter] simply does not care what the sources cited actually say and is hoping that his assertion of 'hundreds of thousands of deaths by starvation' [of civilians in northeast China] will transition from bold claim to factual terrain without being unduly challenged."

Academic Brian DeMare has criticized Dikötter's The Tragedy of Liberation for implying that landlords were a communist-invented fiction. DeMare writes, "Due to Dikötter's choice of phrasing, many readers believe that he is arguing that there were no landlords in China. His citation, however, refers to my UCLA dissertation, where I discuss how the term land lord (dizhu) was an alien word in the countryside [...] There were, to be sure, many landlords in China."
