= The China Quarterly =

British peer-reviewed academic journal

- Discipline: Area studies
- Language: English
- Edited by: Timothy Hildebrandt, Yuka Kobayashi, and Jieyu Liu

Publication details
- History: 1960–present
- Publisher: Cambridge University Press on behalf of the SOAS University of London (United Kingdom)
- Frequency: Quarterly
- Impact factor: 2.5 (2022)

Standard abbreviations
- ISO 4: China Q.

Indexing
- ISSN: 0305-7410 (print); 1468-2648 (web)
- LCCN: 62000248
- OCLC no.: 01554322

Links
- Journal homepage; Online access; Online archive

The China Quarterly
- Traditional Chinese: 中國季刊
- Simplified Chinese: 中国季刊
Transcriptions
Standard Mandarin
- Hanyu Pinyin: Zhōngguó Jìkān
- Wade–Giles: Chung-kuo Chi-k’an

The China Quarterly is a British triple-anonymous peer-reviewed academic journal established in 1960 and published by Cambridge University Press. Owned by the School of Oriental and African Studies, University of London, The China Quarterly is the first academic journal dedicated to the study of contemporary China, and is considered the leading academic journal about China in the world.

The China Quarterly covers anthropology, business, literature, economics, geography, history, international affairs, law, politics, sociology, and the arts of contemporary China including Taiwan. Each issue contains articles, research reports, and a book review section.

== History ==
The China Quarterly began as an offshoot of Soviet Survey, a journal published by the Congress for Cultural Freedom (CCF). In 1959, Walter Laqueur, the editor of Soviet Survey, asked sinologist Roderick MacFarquhar to edit the new journal, the first issue of which was released in 1960. The publisher was transferred in 1968 from CCF to the Contemporary China Institute at the University of London's School of Oriental and African Studies.

The transfer followed the revelation that CCF was funded by the Central Intelligence Agency (CIA) through the Farfield Foundation. MacFarquhar stated he was unaware of the relationship and his editorship was not influenced by CCF. However, he admitted to knowingly publishing articles provided by the CIA and the British Foreign Office's covert propaganda unit, the Information Research Department, and giving the authors pseudonyms to keep their identities secret. David Wilson succeeded MacFarquhar as editor in 1968.

The journal facilitated the shift in Western China studies from policy-oriented research to academic scholarship. Since then, approaches distinct from traditional Sinology—such as comparative, transnational, and interdisciplinary studies—first appeared in this journal before subsequently gaining popularity in other publications.

In August 2017, Cambridge University Press (CUP), the publisher, confirmed that it had removed access to over 300 articles from readers in China following pressure from Chinese government. CUP subsequently reversed its decision and restored the articles, stating that the move was meant to avoid having their entire publication blocked. The press published a list of articles removed, including sensitive topics such as human rights abuses in Xinjiang and Tibet, the 1989 Tiananmen Square protests and massacre, pro-democracy movements in Hong Kong, and the negative effects of the Cultural Revolution. Several academics criticised CUP's self-censorship, while CUP stated that it was "troubled by the recent increase in requests of this nature" and was committed to academic freedom. The Guardian reported the censorship was part of a broader crackdown on dissent since Xi Jinping became the General Secretary of the Chinese Communist Party in 2012.

== Editors ==
- Roderick MacFarquhar (1959–1968), Founding Editor
- David Wilson (1968–1974), with John Gittings serving as Acting Editor in 1972
- Dick Wilson (1975–1980)
- Brian G. Hook (1980–1991)
- David Shambaugh (1991–1996)
- Richard Louis Edmonds (1996–2002)
- Julia Strauss (2002–2011), with Christopher B. Howe acting in 2005
- Chris Bramall (2011–2016)
- Tim Pringle (2016–2025), with Patricia Thornton as Acting Editor in 2021

Its current editors are Timothy Hildebrandt (LSE), Yuka Kobayashi (SOAS), and Jieyu Liu (SOAS).

== Abstracting and indexing ==
This journal is indexed by the following services: Social Sciences Citation Index, Current Contents/Social & Behavioral Sciences, Essential Science Indicators, International Bibliography of Periodical Literature, and International Bibliography of Book Reviews of Scholarly Literature.

== See also ==
- T'oung Pao
