= Run and Hide (novel) =

2022 novel by Pankaj Mishra

Run and Hide: A Novel is a novel by Pankaj Mishra, published in 2022.

== Background ==
It was Mishra's first novel in 20 years.

== Reception ==
Allan Massie of The Scotsman wrote: "This is a wonderfully rich and enjoyable novel." Saloni Sharma of Scroll.in wrote: "Mishra's title remains ambiguous. Whether it is a cautionary tale or a mantra, a literal solution or a metaphorical disguising of the self, is up to the reader to decipher." Arin Keeble of Financial Times wrote: "Run and Hide's flashback narrative, which slowly reveals the story, is an impressive feat of craft, and the book rewards a second reading."

The book was reviewed by Tabish Khair of The Hindu, Tanjil Rashid of The Guardian, Max Liu of the i, Shougat Dasgupta of India Today, Bharat Tandon of The Times Literary Supplement, Jude Cook of The Spectator, Abhrajyoti Chakraborty of The Guardian, Jahnavi Sen of The Wire, and Sam Sacks of The Wall Street Journal.
