= Culture of the Republican era in China =

Overview of the culture of Republican era in China

The culture that led to the founding of the Republic of China and that flourished immediately afterwards was informed by two main concerns: the weakness of the government in the face of pressure by Western powers, including the United Kingdom, the United States, Germany, France, and Japan, and the seeming backwardness of the political system, which previously had held primacy over East Asia. It was this climate that led to the rapid changes and quick questioning of thousand year old traditions.

The abolition of the empire had an immediate effect on dress and customs: the largely Han population immediately cut off the queues that they had been forced to grow in submission to the overthrown Manchus whom they considered alien barbarian invaders. Sun Yat-sen popularized a new style of men's wear, featuring jacket and trousers instead of the pre-existing robes. Adapted from Japanese student wear, this style of dress became known as the Zhongshan suit (Zhongshan being Sun Yat-sen's given name in Chinese). Later, Mao Zedong's variant of the Zhongshan suit would become well known in the West as the Mao suit. Meanwhile, Madame Sun popularised the qipao as the standard female dress. At the same time, old practices such as footbinding, which Chinese had long known was viewed as backwards and unmodern by Westerners, were forbidden.

In the late 1910s and early 1920s, students and intellectuals began to challenge old customs in what became the New Cultural Movement. The era called for iconoclasm, the assertion of individuality, and the liberalization of society (such as through the abolition of arranged marriages). Universities began to incorporate western subjects into the curriculum and discussion of numerous philosophies such as communism and anarchism ensued. Notably, Lu Xun published his satire "Diary of a Madman" to challenge Confucianism, Ba Jin questioned the hierarchical family structure, and Hu Shih called for writing in Vernacular Chinese instead of Literary Chinese for mass appeal. The literary journal New Youth, edited by Chen Duxiu, promoted science and democracy. These changes, though affecting urban and upper class society, failed to reach the peasantry who remained mostly illiterate. Economic equality and gender equality became great concerns among intellectuals, students, and the general public. With the movement of people towards cities also came concern for such issues. Many young intellectuals became interested in communism and liberalism.

In the 1930s, Chiang Kai-shek launched the New Life Movement to promote traditional Confucian social ethics, while rejecting individualism and Western capitalistic values. It also aimed to build up morale in a nation that was besieged with corruption, factionalism, and opium addiction. Some goals included courtesy to neighbors, following rules set by the government, keeping streets clean, and conserving energy.

== Literature Revolution ==
The literature revolution (the vernacular language movement) happened in the late 1910 in China. It is the form of written Chinese based on the varieties of Chinese spoken throughout China. This was in contrast to Classical Chinese which was the written standard used during Imperial China up to the early twentieth century. It was encouraged to display a general dissatisfaction with the programmatic character and the tendency toward uniformity of some of the new literature. It was this movement that breathe the new style into the world of thought in China and build the basic of concept of the May Fourth Movement. Since the early 1920s, this modern vernacular form has been the standard style of writing for all speakers of all varieties of Chinese throughout mainland China, Malaysia, Singapore as well as Taiwan as the written form of modern standard Chinese which is commonly referred to the "Standard Written Chinese" or "Modern Written Chinese".

"The centuries-old three-way opposition between classical written Chinese, vernacular written Chinese, and vernacular spoken Chinese represents an instance of diglossia."

=== May Fourth Literature ===
The May Fourth Movement was an anti-imperialist, cultural, and political movement growing out of student participants in Beijing on 4 May 1919. Mainly university and high school students began the protest against the Chinese government's response to the Treaty of Versailles which allowed Japan to have territories in Shandong. The students were joined by others in the capital. The Chinese government and people had contributed to the Allied cause and expected the German Empire controlled areas of Shandong, especially the port of Tsingdao, to be returned to Chinese sovereignty given Germany's defeat by the Allied Powers. The Chinese diplomats at the Versailles Treaty appeared to have failed the popular will of the Chinese people since the Allied powers ignored them and allowed Japan to lay claim to German 'possessions' in China. Demonstrations accelerated against Japan and the outsider influence in China and gave new energy to the New Culture Movement. Dubbed the May Fourth movement, the next few years saw an upsurge of Chinese nationalism: a shift towards political mobilization and away from cultural activities, and a move towards populism rather than politics led by intellectual elites. As a result, many political and social leaders of the next revolutionary decades in China emerged.

=== Literature of the Thirties (1927-1937) ===
This period is also included in 'May Fourth literature (Wusi wenxue)'. Most Chinese and Japanese scholars agreed that the young style of May Fourth period had declined by the late 1920s. Then it was replaced by 'mature' phase of literary creativity in the 1930s. The term 'literature in the thirty' are broadly referred to work published in the decade from 1927 to 1937.

The literature of the thirties is a crucial period of modern Chinese literature. Writers of the thirties received sophisticated techniques and ideas from the May Fourth literature(1915-1921). The artistic insight came from the social and political crisis such as Japanese invasion in the North of China, Communist revolution and the imperialistic presence of the western powers. Writers in this period started to bond social issues, and politics in their literature. By the 1930s, literature was starting to move toward leftist ideas.

Before May Fourth incident, some groups of writers attempted to make a connection between literature, politics and revolution. In 1923, Deng Zhongxia and Yun Daiying, argued that literature should act like a tool to stimulate people's revolutionary mind. In 1924 and 1925, Jiang Guangci wrote two articles. The first one is 'proletarian revolution and culture'. The second one is ' contemporary Chinese society and revolutionary literature'. Both Guo Moruo and Yu Dafu referred to the term like 'proletarian spirit' and 'class struggle' in their 1923 article. In 1925, Lu Xun sponsored the publication of a translated text called Literary debates in Soviet Russia in Peking. Nonetheless, the isolated effort did not make much impact until the May Thirtieth incident(1925).

Guo Moruo was the first literary man who was involved in political field. His emotional and unrestrained language shows his passion through the article. He once said, ' From literary revolution to revolutionary literature'. This phase represented his ideal world and his strong emotion towards it. He represented the petty-bourgeois against bourgeois class. After some times, the class system started to fade and their ideology were no longer useful. He then tried to create class consciousness focusing on working and peasant class through his medium and make it accessible by everyone. The leftist debate was addressed which soon will be recognised by the public.

Guo Moruo stirred the leftist influence. Guo claimed to be different from Marxism in 1924 after reading the Marxist Kawakami Hajime. He wrote 'revolution and literature', an emotional essay. He defined revolution as the rebellion against the oppressor in different period of time. He seems to conclude that the newer the better. The revolutionary action will fulfil the need for mankind and change the social organization. As a result, he argued that a good and real literature should consisted of revolutionary ideas. Since revolution literature comes with the heaviest emotion of mankind, it is as the ' golden age of literature'.

Although there are many ideological debate during the early thirties, it does not contribute much to literary creativity. Some of the most creative leftist writers in the 1930s are Mao Dun, Lao She, Wu Zuxiang, Zhang Tianyi, Ba Jin, and Wen Yiduo. Their ideology were often expressed from their own analysis with artistic expression. The collective effort of the thirties is recognised as the literary 'renaissance' of fiction, poetry and drama. Before the Japanese invasion, those writers slowly settled on their own unique and matured styles of their works. Nonetheless, wars mark an end for more experimental techniques of modernistic poetry. Only dramas were popular during the war time for two purposes. Firstly, dramas acted as a tool for propaganda. The second purpose of drama acted as an escapist entertainment in Shanghai because the cities was occupied by the Japanese. The four new literary creations coming from the western world are essay, novel, modern verse, and spoken drama.

==== The Essay ====
Essay is the form of writing that aim to present the doctrinal debates, social criticism, and cultural criticism in the most effective way. The outcome of ideological debate lead to the popularity of 'feuilleton' in foreign terms or 'miscellaneous essay'. From this medium of writing spread the new ideology to the people who can read.

Lu Xun, the outstanding essay writer of this period, made an attempt to write short essay form while he started writing short stories. His works were published in New Youth and Yu-ssu. He wrote with the vernacular language mixing with classical terms and idiom. His essays make a satire about the society. Utilitarian ideology was used as a mean for writing. His essay not only attacked the dark side of Chinese cultures and society, but also tried to pushed the idea of collective Chinese mind to readers. His work is not clearly seen as an essay if viewed by the Westerner's eyes because they are essay, prose, poetry, and short story all at once.

In the early 1930, he started to include more political issues in his writing. His writing stimulated the debate in the society. He himself thought that it is essential to move away from lyricism toward polemicism in order to gain political engagement. His satire became reproduced and imitated by other writers. As a result, the more shallow essays were produced and the essays were devalued. He then wrote a famous article called "The Crisis of Personal Essay" (1933).

"Diary of a Madman" is one of his most famous stories. He got the style from a Russian realist named Nikolay Gogol's tales. The story was told by the perspective of a man who see traditional Confucian culture as something unpleasant for the society. The debate about Confucian ideas was on the trend during this decade. The vernacular Chinese written in the story gain popularity and attention. This common language made the war for short story in the near future.

Zhou Zuoren, Lu Hsun's brother, uses essays as an alternative to prose writing. His style is similar to classical tradition namely Gong'an and Jing-line school which accentuate on personal expression. His prose is brief and elegant showing his balanced mentality. His popular essay included the "1981 Article". The essay can be categorised as a humanist literature. In other words, it is a literature against human instinct and human nature. Traditional Chinese customs was criticised. For example, the wife was bullied alive regarding the death of their husband.

==== Fiction ====
Fiction of the period combined mature style of writing with social analysis. Famous authors in the period include Mao Dun, Lao She, Shen Congwen, Zhang Tianyi, Ba Jin and Wu Zuxiang.

Mao Dun's major pieces of fiction are Eclipse (1928), Hong or Rainbow (1933), and Ziye or Midnight. His early work experiment with the late Qing social novel with naturalism or realism, European technique. The technique was reflected through his careful arrangement of material, and the new objective point of view narrative. Characters was portrayed as a sufferer from social and economical influence. The novel shows a tragic concern that the class society will be extinct. In The Rainbow(1930), an urban intellectual represented a heroine. The story presented about young women running away from her middle-class family to join the May Thirties movement in Shanghai. The novel contains 500 pages. The set up was a massive construction of urban society in Shanghai. Characters are varied from bankers, landlords, students and so on while workers were not focused.

Shen Congwen was also one popular. He and Lao She revealed the negative opinion toward urbanization. In Alice's Travel in China or A'li'ssu Chung-Kuo you-chi, Shen criticized the pretentious and hypocritical way of living of urban people. He sympathized on rural character who lived in the city. He tried to show that the rural characters processed 'noble savage' quality like honesty. The rural people are morally superior than those who live in the cities. Other novels included Long River and Boarder Town (1934).

Lao She's vision is more toward real values of old China. His novels convey that older generation of Chinese was simple, sincere, and honest. He lived in Peking which contained various element of traditional China. His most famous novel is Camel Hsiang-tzu. The novel shows the downturn of Peking due to the erupted social change and corruption. The city is portrayed to be destroyed by the 'modernising' force. The heroine named Hsiang-tzu were victimised by many influence such as the environmental, economical changes, and the immoral middle class. This theme was also repeatedly stated in his other works. His leftist idea attempt to stimulate the public opinion for urgent collective action. After the liberation, the socialist reality was more powerful than he expected. He then committed suicide or was murdered in 1966.

Ba Jin is one of the most renowned novelists of the 1930s. One of his well known novels is called The Family (1933). It was recognised as the ' Bible of modern Chinese Youth'. The story of is the account of his own experience. His story shows a conflict between the old generation and the younger generation during his lifetime. The three Kao brothers represent different types of May Fourth intellectual people rebelling against 'feudal society'.

Zhang Tianyi is a left wing writer and children books' author. He believed in communist theory. Nonetheless, he was not as ideological compared to other writers. In his novel implies that change is easy when we can use normal language to express opinion and manipulate other people. Twenty-one presented problems between the soldiers and their officers. In the Spring Breeze, Zhang uses the school setting to present the class oppression. The teacher of this schools are the upperclass people, the students are poor. The teacher are cruel to the student as it portrayed the upperclass people trying to oppress the lower class.

Eileen Chang was one of the most influential writers born in Shanghai. In her early life, her mother gave her books to read such as a Dream of the Red Chamber which is recognised as one of the four great classical novel of Chinese literature. These styles and inspiration in the novel was also reflected in most of her novels and works. At the age of twelve, she started to write a short novel and story which was published in the school magazine. Unlike the mainstream of this period influenced by the May Fourth, she wrote about the modern relationship between men and women. Her well known novels included Love in a Fallen City (1943). She referred to her own private life, and also reflected the rise of a national movement at the bottom class of Chinese modernity. This novella became a film in 1984 and then was made to be a TV series in 2009. After the Anti-Japanese War, she moved to Hong Kong and became a U.S. citizens.

==== Regional literature ====
The regional literature emerged as a sub-genre of fiction. This genre tried to capture the nature and feeling in rural area. Most writers came from the country side, so they depict their experience, hardships, and sometimes, discrimination that urban people have against rural people. This regional literature are mostly written to stimulate people's opinion for the revolution. One significant group of writers that will make a mark on political scene is a group of refugee from Manchuria. They were invaded by the Japanese in 1931. Their works depicting the Japanese's aggression to the people in Manchuria became famous very quickly. The story also triggered the feeling of patriotism that later spread to the entire nation.

Hsiao Chun is the leader of Manchuria writers. His novels included Pu-yueh ti hsiang-ts-t'sm or Village in August. It is the first contemporary Chinese novel being translated into English. His tense emotions and experience towards everything from animals, atmosphere and suffering people lead his novel to be popular. His later works includes, The Story of Yang or The Story of Goats, and long novel named Ti-san Tai or The Third Generation.

Hsiao Hung is another talented writer from the Manchuria group. She is a wife of Hsiao Chun. One of her novelette is The Field of Life and Death (1934). She was an expert in using Manchurian dialects and idioms. She gave an image of rural life as it go along with seasonal changes. She also wrote about natural stages of human life which are birth, age, sickness, and death. However, these natural cycle of life was intervened by the Japanese soldiers. The spirit of Manchuria people and region is well described by her narrative.

==== Poetry ====
In the early modern Chinese poetry, writers attempted to break away from the traditional rules to have free expression.

Hsu Chih-mo was the very first poet who brought the Western techniques to China. He was educated in England until 1922. As a result, he is greatly influenced and inspired by the work of Wordsworth, Shelley, and Keats. His early poem includes "Chih-mo's poetry" (1925), "A Night in Florence" (1927) and "Fierce Tiger" (1928). The well known poem for westerners would be "Saying Goodbye to Cambridge Again". He died in an airplane crash on the way to Peking in 1931.

Wen I-to was a friend of Hsu and also colleague at the Crescent Moon Society. Since he used to do painting, his poem is visually imaginable. His works explored on formalistic element. Instead of making it simple like other authors in this period, symbolism elements were included in his poems. The aim of his poem is to "recapture the symbolism and ethos of premodern Chinese society". In other words, he wanted to capture the culture of people in this period of time through his poem. His early works surprised the readers with metaphors and allusion. The popular words include, "Red Candles" (1923), and "Dead Water" (1929).

==== Drama ====
Drama in this period can be called as 'New theatre', 'New drama', or 'civilised drama'. The beginning of modern Chinese China was triggered by the inspiration from the western world similarly to Chinese poetry. The initial effort began by the foundation of Spring Willow Society in Japan in 1907. They began by translating the plays such as La Dame aux Camelias. One element of this Civilised drama was the 'spoken drama' contradicting to the traditional 'singing drama'. This form was adopted by Ti-ien Han. The purpose of these dramas is to distribute and propagate new ideas.

Ts'ao Yu was one of the most popular playwright in modern China. He wrote his first play, Thunderstorm (1934) while he was a student at Tsing-Hua. The story is about the mental and physical downfall of one family due to incest. The story criticises the strict tradition and pretentious actions of the Westernised Zhou family. This play was performed in 1935, then went on tour. Another famous play was Sunrise (1936). This story tell about the corruption, the extravagant life of the rich in China and the suffering of the poor in China. Chen Balu, the high class prostitute in Shiang Hai in 1930s, was the main protagonist. She enjoyed the luxurious life, however, she ends up committing a suicide due her bankruptcy, the death of a young girl who she tried to save from being a prostitute, and the end of her first boyfriend.

==== Magazine ====
New Youth was a magazine which started being published by Chen Duxiu in 1915. He was a journalist and politician, and regarded as one of the leaders of New Culture Movement. He made his efforts to modernize China by introducing Euro-American culture, which was based on science and democracy, and showed his rejection of traditional Chinese literature and aesthetic. He became the first general secretary of the Chinese Communist Party in 1921. Weekly Critic was a magazine, which was first published in 1918 by Ch'en Tu-hsiu and Li Ta-chao. They dedicated to discuss national and world politics. The magazine identified history' goal with the advantage of Western democracy and science as well as New Youth, and mainly criticized the Chinese government. New Tide was launched by some senior students from Peking University in 1919. They were influenced by New Youth and Weekly Critic and followed the thought of them.

In opposition to the New Literature Movement, The National Heritage was published by the exponents of the classical pattern of literature in Peking University. They only published the articles written in Chinese classical style. In the same way, a group of professors of the Higher Normal College in Nanking started publishing a magazine called The Critical Review all in classical language.

== Agriculture ==
During the republican era, Chinese economy was mostly agricultural. In 1933, it was estimated at 65 percent of the total net domestic product. This output, whose sectors were plant, animal, Forest, Fishery and Miscellaneous products, was supposed to be produced by 205 million agricultural workers, which counted 79 percent of the labor force. Plant products dominated, and the estimate shows that 80 percent of the plant products are composed of food crops like rice, wheat and other grain, potatoes, vegetables, and fruits. Until 1937, the total output of agriculture kept growing as the population increased. Japanese invasion and the war in the mid 1937 is regarded as the factor of the decline. War and civil war between 1937 and 1949 made it impossible to collect the rural statistical data of the Nanking Government. Especially farmers in North China were affected badly because of the damage to the land, transport disruptions, conscription of manpower and draught of animals, and request of grain for the armies.

=== The Regional Differences of Agriculture ===
The number of rural family might range from four to 30, and the size of village varied. Northeastern China was favored with enough fertile land, which brought immigrants from the northern provinces. They farmed the soy beans and food grains. In east-central China, which was rice-wheat region, and there had warmer climate, unvaried rainfall, and slightly acidic soil, and favored higher crop yields. In the foremost south-east province of Kwangtung, which is tropical area, peasants engaged in growing fruits and fish farming, and cultivating varied crops with rice. In central, south east, and south west Chine, because of the climate and soil there, a cycle of two crops a year was common while three crops every two years practiced in North.

== Architecture ==
=== Development phases ===
==== May Fourth Movement to the outbreak of anti-Japanese War (1919-1937) ====
This is the stage of the prosperity and development of Chinese modern architecture. During 1920 to 1930, Shanghai, Tianjin, Beijing, Nanjing and other major cities and some provincial capitals, building activities are increasing. Nanjing, Shanghai, respectively, the "Capital Plan" and "Big Shanghai Urban Plan", the construction of a number of administrative buildings. The Construction of residential buildings, in Shanghai, Tianjin, Guangzhou, Hankou and some cities in the northeast, a number of high-rise buildings with higher levels of modernization have been built. Especially in Shanghai, has 28 high-rise buildings over 10 stories in the period. Building technology has made great progress in these 20 years. Many high-rise, large, long-span, complex projects to achieve a high construction quality. Some of the buildings in the design and technical equipment has been close to the foreign advanced level. The ranks of Chinese architects have grown. The architects who returned from abroad have set up the Chinese architects ' office and have set up the architectural specialty in the middle and higher schools, introduced and disseminated the architectural technology and creative ideas of the developed countries.

In 1927, the Chinese Institute of Architects and the Shanghai Association of Architects founded. Respectively, published a professional publication "China Architecture" (1932) and the "Building Monthly Publication" (1932).

In 1929, Society for the Study of Chinese Architecture founded. The architects Liang Sicheng, Liu Dunzhen Research work in the society. Modern Chinese architecture in this stage is not only the introduction of Western architecture, but also a combination of China's actual creation of some modern architecture with Chinese characteristics.

==== Outbreak of anti-Japanese War to the People's Republic of China (1937-1949) ====
This is the stagnation period of Chinese modern architecture. During the anti-Japanese war, China's construction industry was in a state of depression. After the Second World War, many countries were actively engaged in post-war construction and the construction activities were very active. Through the spread of Western architectural books and the introduction of a few newly returned architects, Chinese architects have more contact with the thought of modern architecture abroad. Only in this period, China is in the domestic war environment, there are few construction activities, and modern architectural trend of thought has no great influence on Chinese construction practice.

=== Residential Buildings ===
Modern China's rural, market town, Small and medium-sized cities and large cities in the old urban areas, still take the traditional residential form. The new type of residential building is mainly concentrated in some parts of big city. This kind of new house has the basic form of single type, Lian-Hu type and multi type.

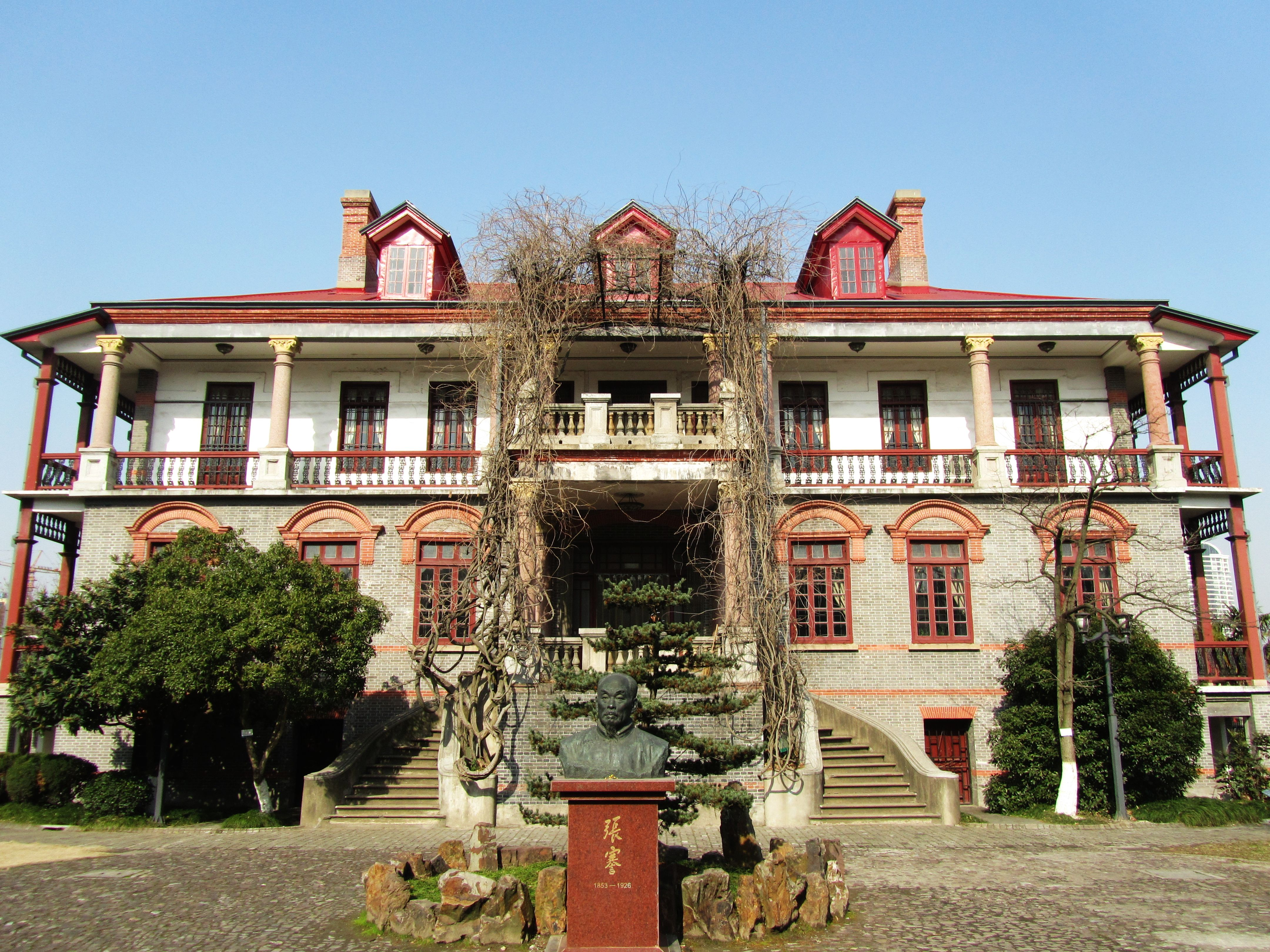
Haonan Villa (Nantong)

==== Single-family houses ====
These appeared in the 1900 before and after the detached-style senior residential. These dwellings are basically a replica of the high-end residential buildings that were popular in the west, and are generally located in the urban environment. Most of the appearance are like the French, Britain, Germany form of a mansion, the occupants are mainly foreign officials and capitalists.

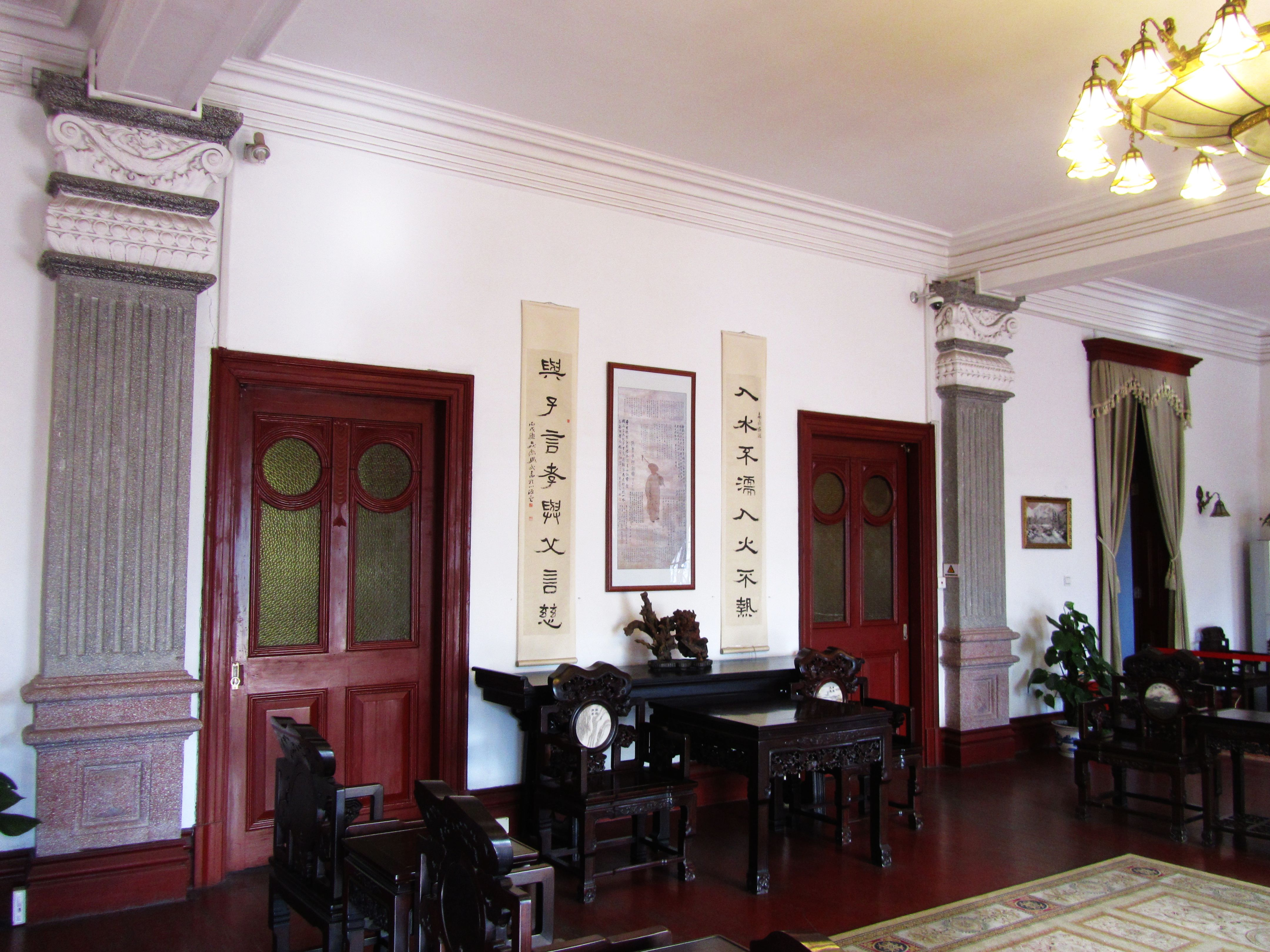
Inside of Haonan Villa

Before and after the Xinhai Revolution, Chinese top people also began to build. From the modern businessman Zhang Jian in Nantong "Haonan Villa", the characteristics of the high-grade residential: architectural forms and technical equipment are mostly adopted Western style, while the room layout, decoration, garden and others preserve the Chinese traditional characteristics.

Since the 1920s, the single-family residential form has gradually shifted from luxurious detached-style high-class residences to comfortable garden residences, and the number of construction has increased, and the garden residential areas have been formed in Shanghai and Nanjing.

==== Lian-Hu type ====
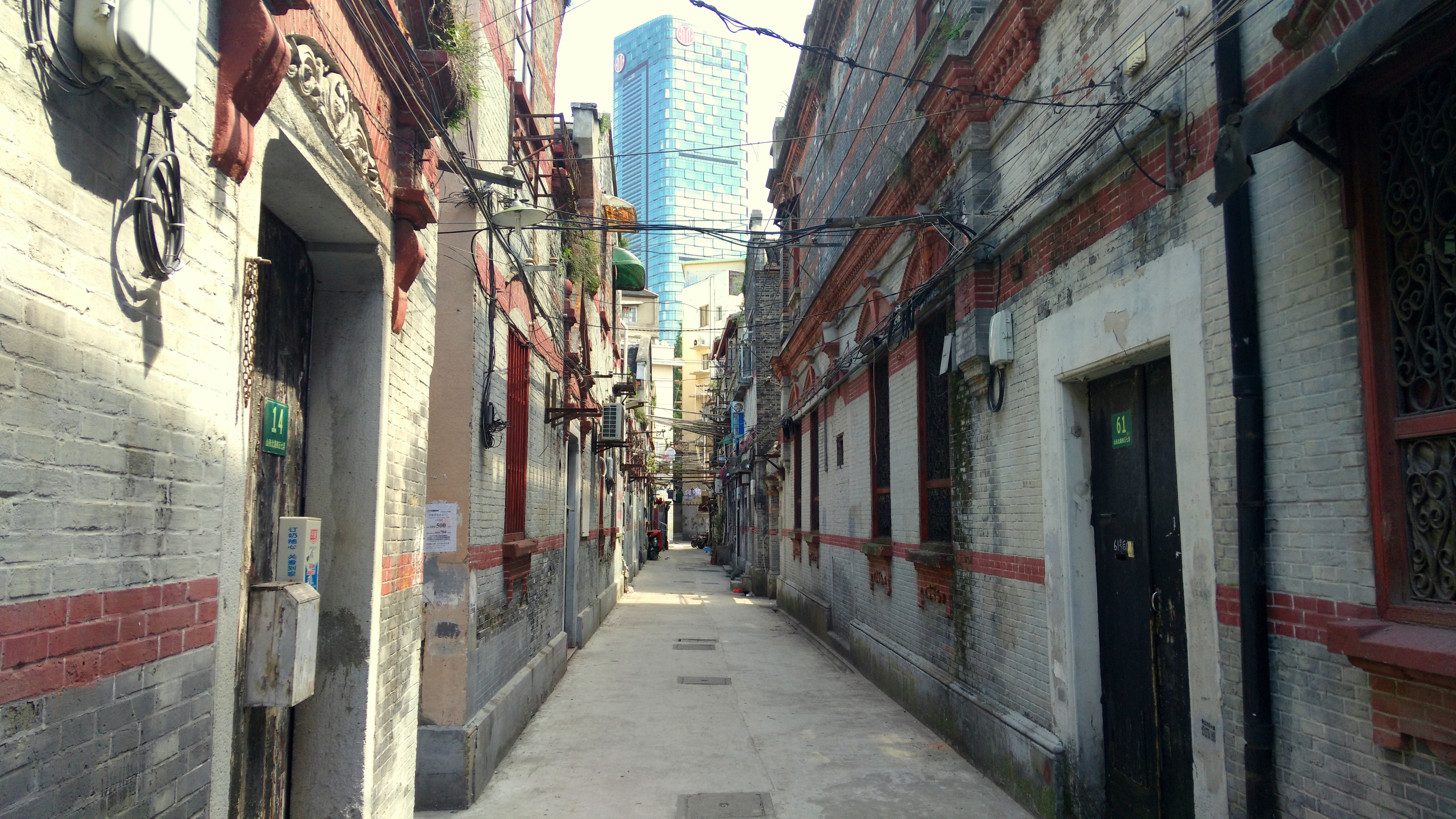
Shikumen

House called Longtang was first in the 20th century in Shanghai, is imported from Europe intensive living methods. Then Hankou, Nanjing, Tianjin, Fuzhou, Qingdao and other land in the concession, Wharf, commercial center near the formation of residential areas. The residential buildings in Shanghai are divided into stone gate as "Shikumen", new ones, garden lanes and apartment-style homes according to the needs of different classes of residents. The early Shikumen clearly reflect the intersection of Chinese and Western architectural styles. The residential area is compact in layout, economical in land use and full in space.

=== Architects ===
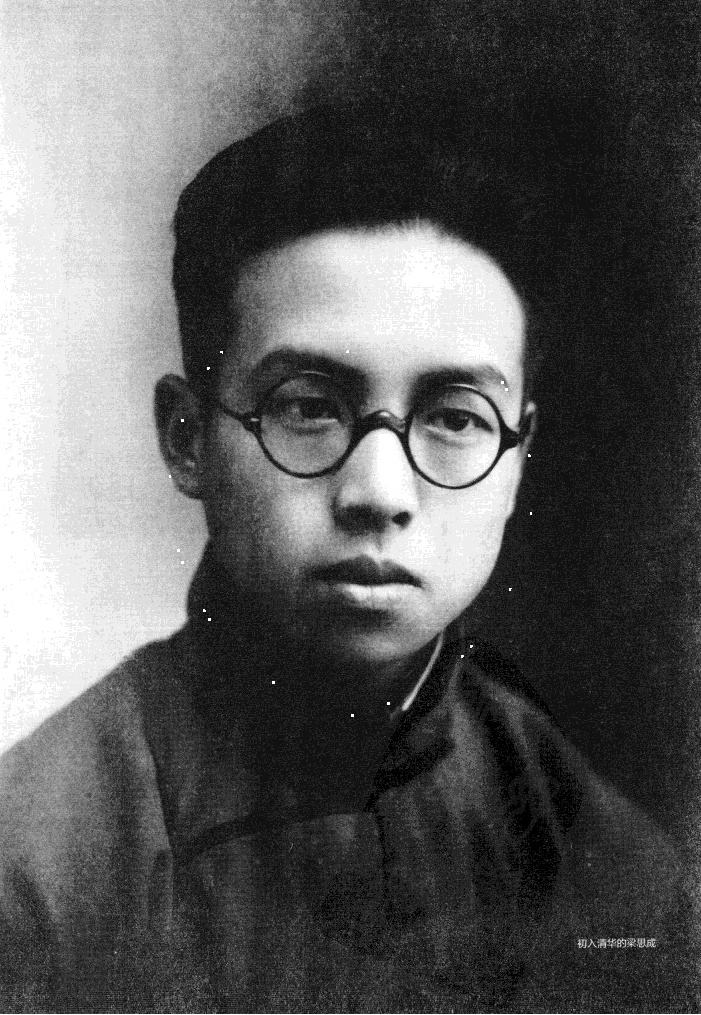
Liang Sicheng

==== Liang Sicheng ====
Liang Sicheng (梁思成; April 20, 1901 – January 9, 1972) is the author of China's first modern history on Chinese architecture and founder of the Architecture Department of Northeast University in 1928 and Tsinghua University in 1946. He was the Chinese representative in the Design Board which designed the United Nations headquarters in New York. He, along with Lin Huiyin (1904–1955), Mo Zongjiang (1916–1999), and Ji Yutang (1902–c. 1960s), discovered and analyzed the first and second oldest timber structures still standing in China, located at Nanchan Temple and Foguang Temple at Mount Wutai.

He is recognized as the "Father of Modern Chinese Architecture". To cite Princeton University, which awarded him an honorary doctoral degree in 1947, he was "a creative architect who has also been a teacher of architectural history, a pioneer in historical research and exploration in Chinese architecture and planning, and a leader in the restoration and preservation of the priceless monuments of his country."

==== Du Guangan ====
In 1930s, China has emerged a large number of outstanding architects, known as the Chinese architects "self-reliance" period. Du Guangan was graduated from the University of Pennsylvania in 1930 Graduate School of Architecture. He taught at the Department of Architecture in Northeastern University. Also he had worked with Liang Sicheng to carry out the study of ancient Chinese architecture, and completed the history of Chinese architecture at the end of the war. He has designed many excellent buildings for Qingdao, and actively participates in the construction of new China after the founding of the PRC.

== Feminism movement ==
=== Xinhai Revolution and Women Suffrage Movement ===
==== Spread of feminism idea ====
Before the breakout of Xinhai Revolution, revolutionists spread the idea of gender equality, using the liberation of gender to appeal all women to join the revolution.

In 1903, Zou Rong made the follow statement in his work The Revolutionary Army: Anyone belongs to citizen of China regardless of gender; People are equal whatever gender they are as long as they belong to citizen.

In the same year, Jin Tianhe also published his work about feminism, criticizing traditional moral standard and suggesting to educate female on a higher standard.

In 1907, Qiu Jin established a newspaper called 'Chinese Women's News', criticizing traditional limitation on gender and spreading gender equality, appealing women to do more things than housework.

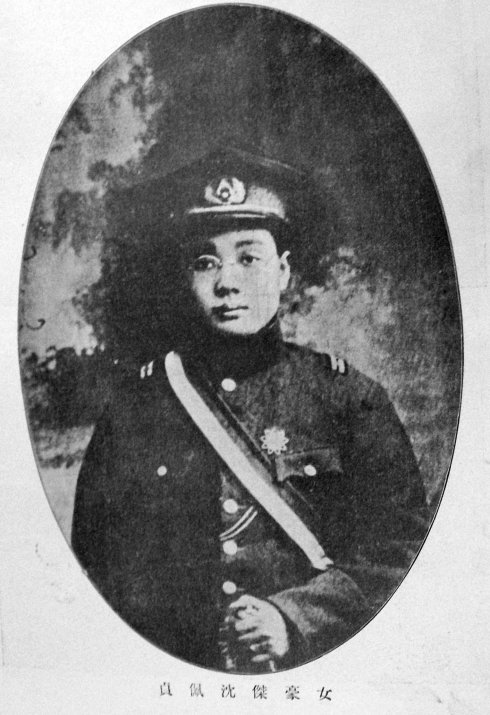
Shen Peizhen

==== Breakout of Xinhai Revolution and females' participation ====
In 1911, under Sun Yat-sen's leadership, bourgeois-democratic revolutionary, Xinhai Revolution, broke out.

Female troops in Shanghai made their contribution to the overthrow of Qing Dynasty. Under the leadership of Shanghai Hospital's president Zhang Zhujun, Red cross was organized with hundreds of people to participate in nursing the injury on the battlefield in multi-places, including Zhenjiang, Nanjing, and so on. Moreover, even several military organizations which are made up by female appeared. They officially received the instruction and weapons from government. They had good performance in the overthrow of Qing Dynasty.

In southern cities such as Shanghai, Wuxi, Jiaxing, and so on, wives of several officers organized donation activity to support temporary government in Nanking for soldiers' pay and provision, as well as their uniforms, etc. Some participants even donated their own ornaments. Even Sun Yat-sen praised their efforts.

Many female revolutionists appeared in this era. Feminists worked on mobilizing women to join the revolution as well as improving their status by a varieties of means, service, education, nursing, donation. They were trying to change women's unequal status by directly participating in the overthrow of current political order.

==== Demand of suffrage ====
After the establishment of Provisional Government of the Republic of China (1912), women from all fields started to demand their political rights, especially suffrage rights.

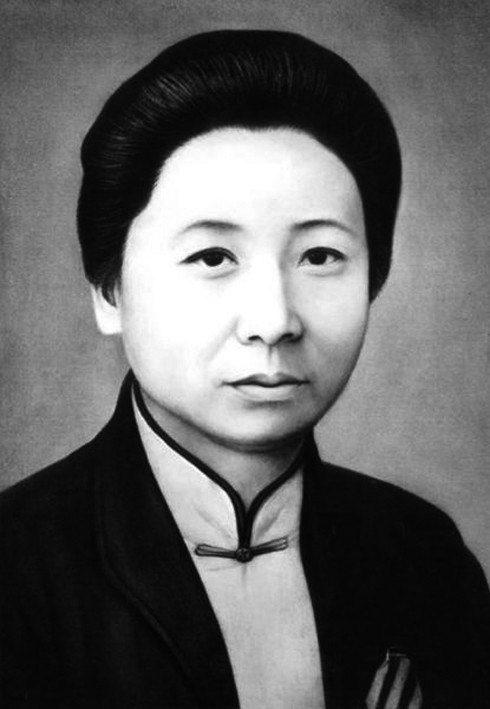
Tang Qunying

During the draft of Provisional Constitution of the Republic of China, no terms or articles mentioned anything about gender equality. Tang Qunying, the president of the Women's Backup Society, demanded the provisional government to give suffrage right for women. She made 5 proposals to provisional senate and Sun Yat-sen himself, neither was accepted by senate. On March 20, she led a group of women rushed who into the meeting room, broke the glass windows and attacked the guards.

In September 1913, the president of International Alliance of Women, Carrie Chapman Catt visited Shanghai to investigate the situation of women's suffrage. During her tenure, women in the United States successfully got the suffrage right. However, in November of the same year, Minister of Internal Affairs forced all organizations related with women suffrage to dissolute.

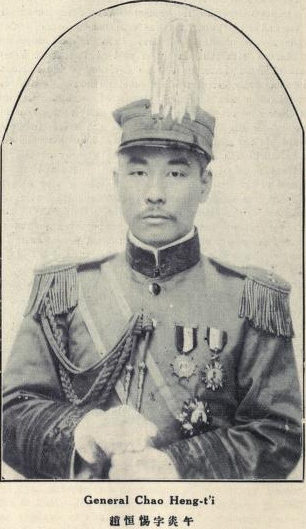
Hunan Warlod - Zhao Hengti

In 1924, when Zhao Hengti was in charge of Hunan Province, who advocates of a federalist constitution, Hunan committee of federalist constitution finally agreed to add terms about gender equality in provincial constitution. This term guarantees the gender equality on politic and education. This is the first time constitution in China included terms about gender equality.

In the early 20th century, Zhejiang, Guangdong, Hunan had the most activate suffrage movement about constitution, whose participants were mainly female students in urban areas. Except the victory of Hunan in 1924 and victory in Zhejiang in 1921, all the other movements ended in failure.

After the failure on politics, the feminist politicians focused on other fields. Tang Qunying focused on women colleges, and Shen Peizhen established factories to attract women to work.

=== Anti-imperialist Patriotic Movement from feminists' perspective ===
Through the history of Chinese revolution from late Qing Dynasty to the Republic Era, besides reformists and revolutionists, feminists also contributed their power in various political movement about patriotism and anti-imperialism. They were represented by the moderate women and young female college students. They participated in various kind of activities, including donation, speech, and entrepreneurship.

On March 24, 1901, almost one thousand patriots gathered in Shanghai, protesting Russia's intention to occupy Manchuria. During that meeting, Xue Jinqin, a 16-year-old girl, delivered a speech criticizing Russia and Qing Dynasty, suggest to replace foreign minister. This speech is the first public speech delivered by woman in Chinese history.

In 1907, several southern provinces, including Jiangsu, Zhejiang, Sichuan and others, started actions against Britain imperialists' attempt to control railroads in China. Feminists also joined it. On September 28, patriotic female college students held a meeting to resist loans for Hu-Hang-Yong Railroad. On that meeting, official request to government and purchase of shares had been made.

From 1912, feminists responded the call of Sun Yat-sen by establishing female industries, which can be regarded as one part of enterprise salvation movement.

=== New Culture Movement and Sexual liberation ===
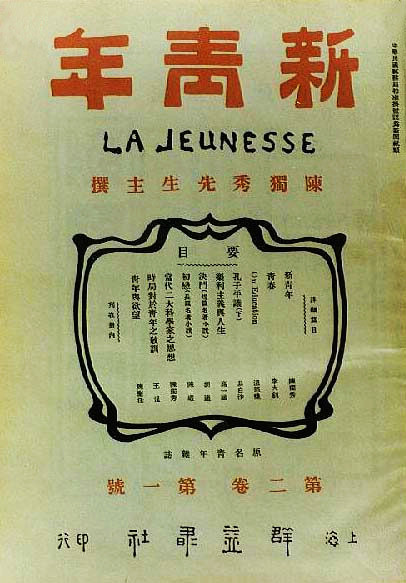
New Youth (La Jeunesse)

==== 'New Youth' and revolution in ideology ====
Chen Duxiu emphasized feminism from a socialist perspective. Chen thinks that the dependence to male directly leads to the personal dependence of female to male, thus, women must work to liberate themselves.

Lu Xun, who grew up in a traditional landlord family, criticized traditional view of virginity, pointed out that such demands on virginity and loyalty to women is extremely immoral, and is also not beneficial to both individuals and society.

Hu Shih also talked about virginity issue. He thinks virginity is an attitude of man and woman treating each other, it is not exclusively to woman, but should serve as restriction on both male and female.

==== Sexual liberation ====
In the beginning of 1927, nationalist government moved from Guangzhou to Wuhan, made it center of national revolution. March 8, the nationalist government arranged more than 200,000 people to celebrate International Women's Day. Member of women's association were promoting the concept of marriage freedom and love freedom, criticizing traditional practice of foot binding and breast binding.

In the same year July, Guangdong committee of nationalist government passed the proposal to officially ban the breast binding.

=== Feminism in suburbs and Communist movement ===
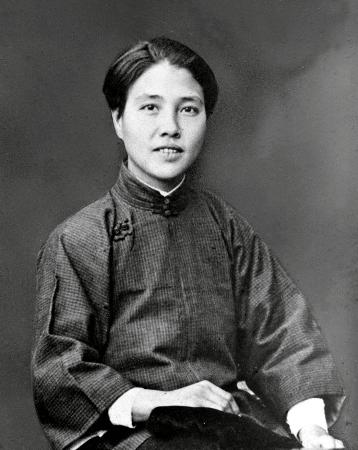
Xiang Jingyu

Generally speaking, there were 3 kinds of feminists movement in Chinese suburb areas: revolutionary movement about political and legal equality, Christianity movement about charity and social service, communist movement aim to get economic interest.

During the 3rd National Congress of the Chinese Communist Party in Guangzhou, for the first time, women have as much rights as men. the proposal drafted by Xiang Jingyu got passed, which clearly announced that women shall have right of inheritance, freedom on marriage, divorce and labor.

=== Yan'An Period ===
==== Marriage and sex regulation: from absolute freedom to freedom ====
China revolution is first of all a political revolution and social revolution, but one the target to be criticized includes traditional morality, moreover, "Freedom" and "Liberation" are in the slogan of promotion, thus, for young people who were interested in communist party, the freedom of marriage also means freedom of sex.

This freedom of sex and ignorance on physiology led to increase on abortion and further decrease of military capacity in the army. Moreover, taking peasants' conservatism into consideration, the communist party started to change the law on marriage from absolute freedom to freedom.

After Red Army reached the north of Shanxi Province in 1939, Shan-Gan-Ning government announced Marriage Regulation of Shan-Gan-Ning, which has specific requirement on various situation of marriage.

While the legislation was transforming, the propaganda was changing as well. The slogan of marriage freedom is replaced by harmony of family, as well as the emphasize on caution and consideration in official files and papers related with marriage and family.

Communist Party did not give up on the liberation of gender, women can still divorce if they cannot tolerate, which is clearly stated in that regulation as well. But communists started to think the slogan of feminist movement must be made based on the recognize level of peasants themselves. What's more important, facing the threat from Kuomintang, Imperial Japan, and local warlords, Communist party had to put more weight on peasants' interest rather than women's.

== Media ==
=== New Youth ===
This is one of the representative modernism magazines which was popular in 1920s to 1930s. Is related with the concept of literacy evolution. This book led to spread the world of thoughts in 1910s. The representative slogan was "democratic and science", the contributors appealed to establish the new culture, which is based on "democratic" and "science". Main writers of "New Youth" is occupied by the intellectual class in Beijing especially among Beijing University such as Lu Xun, Hu Shih and Zhou Zuoren. Thanks to their contributions, the important concepts whose origins were from Modern Western such as human beings, romantics and currency systems are spread in Chinese literature all at once. New Youth was very popular among intellectuals who lived in cities and known as "city magazine".

=== Lu Xun ===
Lu Xun was the pen name of Zhou Shuren (September 25, 1881 – October 19, 1936), a leading figure of modern Chinese literature. Writing in Vernacular Chinese and Classical Chinese, he was a short story writer, editor, translator, literary critic, essayist, poet, and designer. In the 1930s, he became the titular head of the League of Left-Wing Writers in Shanghai. After the 1919 May Fourth Movement, Lu Xun's writing began to exert a substantial influence on Chinese literature and popular culture. Like many leaders of the May Fourth Movement, he was primarily a leftist and liberal. He was highly acclaimed by the Chinese government after 1949, when the People's Republic of China was founded, and Mao Zedong himself was a lifelong admirer of Lu Xun's writing. Though sympathetic to socialist ideas, Lu Xun never joined the Chinese Communist Party.

=== Hu Shih ===
Hu Shih (December 17, 1891 – February 24, 1962) was a Chinese philosopher, essayist and diplomat. Hu is widely recognized today as a key contributor to Chinese liberalism and language reform in his advocacy for the use of written vernacular Chinese. He was influential in the May Fourth Movement, one of the leaders of China's New Culture Movement, was a president of Peking University, and in 1939 was nominated for a Nobel Prize in literature. He had a wide range of interests such as literature, history, textual criticism, and pedagogy.

Hu was well known as the primary advocate for the literary revolution of the era, a movement which aimed to replace scholarly classical Chinese in writing with the vernacular spoken language, and to cultivate and stimulate new forms of literature. In an article originally published in New Youth in January 1917 titled "A Preliminary Discussion of Literature Reform", Hu originally emphasized eight guidelines that all Chinese writers should take to heart in writing:

Write with substance. By this, Hu meant that literature should contain real feeling and human thought. This was intended to be a contrast to the recent poetry with rhymes and phrases that Hu saw as being empty. Do not imitate the ancients. Literature should not be written in the styles of long ago, but rather in the modern style of the present era. Respect grammar. Hu did not elaborate at length on this point, merely stating that some recent forms of poetry had neglected proper grammar. Reject melancholy. Recent young authors often chose grave pen names, and wrote on such topics as death. Hu rejected this way of thinking as being unproductive in solving modern problems. Eliminate old clichés. The Chinese language has always had numerous four-character sayings and phrases used to describe events. Hu implored writers to use their own words in descriptions, and deplored those who did not. Do not use allusions. By this, Hu was referring to the practice of comparing present events with historical events even when there is no meaningful analogy. Do not use couplets or parallelism. Though these forms had been pursued by earlier writers, Hu believed that modern writers first needed to learn the basics of substance and quality, before returning to these matters of subtlety and delicacy. Do not avoid popular expressions or popular forms of characters. This rule, perhaps the most well-known, ties in directly with Hu's belief that modern literature should be written in the vernacular, rather than in Classical Chinese. He believed that this practice had historical precedents, and led to greater understanding of important texts.
