= Mao's Great Famine =

2010 book by Frank Dikötter

Mao's Great Famine: The History of China's Most Devastating Catastrophe, 1958–62
- Cover of the 2010 first edition
- Author: Frank Dikötter
- Publisher: Walker & Company (hardcover, United States); Bloomsbury Publishing (hardcover, United Kingdom; softcover, United States)
- Publication date: 6 September 2010
- Media type: Print (hardback)
- Pages: 448
- ISBN: 978-0-8027-7768-3 (hardcover, United States)

Mao's Great Famine: The History of China's Most Devastating Catastrophe, 1958–62, is a 2010 book by professor and historian Frank Dikötter about the Great Chinese Famine of 1958–1962 in the People's Republic of China under Mao Zedong (1893–1976). It was based on four years of research in recently opened Chinese provincial, county, and city archives.

The book was well-received and won the Samuel Johnson Prize in 2011, and has been described by Andrew J. Nathan, Professor and Chair of the Department of Political Science at Columbia University, as "the most detailed account yet" of the Great Chinese Famine. It received critical academic reviews, due to the book's selective use of sources, lack of context, methodological flaws, sensational tone, and distortion of evidence. Dikötter responded to some of criticisms. There was also criticism related to the image, which predated Mao's rule, used by Dikötter and the publisher for the cover.

== Background ==
Dikötter is Chair Professor of Humanities at the University of Hong Kong, where he teaches courses on both Mao and the Great Chinese Famine, and Professor of the Modern History of China from the School of Oriental and African Studies at the University of London. The author's research behind the book was funded in the United Kingdom by the Wellcome Trust, the Arts and Humanities Research Council, and the Economic and Social Research Council, and in Hong Kong by the Research Grants Council and the Chiang Ching-kuo Foundation. Dikötter was one of only a few historians granted access to the relevant Chinese archives.

== Key arguments ==
On a website providing exposure for the book, Dikötter detailed his key arguments. First, he stated that the famine lasted at least four years (early 1958 to late 1962), not the three sometimes stated. After researching large volumes of Chinese archives, Dikötter came to the conclusion that decisions coming from the top officials of the Chinese government in Beijing were the direct cause of the famine. Beijing government officials, including Mao Zedong and Zhou Enlai, increased the food procurement quota from the countryside to pay for international imports. Dikötter wrote: "In most cases the party knew very well that it was starving its own people to death." In 1959, Mao was quoted as saying in Shanghai "When there is not enough to eat people starve to death. It is better to let half of the people die so that the other half can eat their fill."

Overall, Dikötter estimated that there were 45 million premature deaths, not 30 million as previously estimated. Some two to three million of these were victims of political repression, beaten or tortured to death, or summarily executed for political reasons, often for the slightest infraction. Because local communist cadres were in charge of food distribution, they were able to withhold food from anyone of whom they disapproved. Old, sick and weak individuals were often regarded as unproductive and hence expendable. Apart from Mao, Dikötter accused several other members of the top party leadership of doing nothing about the famine. While famine was ravaging the country, free food was still being exported to allies, as well as economic aid and interest-free or low-interest loans. In addition to the human suffering, some 30 to 40 percent of all rural housing was demolished in village relocations, for building roads and infrastructure, or sometimes as punishment for political opposition. Up to 50 percent of trees were cut down in some provinces, as the rural system of human ecology was ruined.

== Reception ==
Dikötter's website listed positive responses from Orville Schell, former Dean of the University of California, Berkeley Graduate School of Journalism; Simon Sebag-Montefiore, author of Stalin: The Court of the Red Tsar (2003); and Jung Chang, author of Mao: The Unknown Story (2005). Jasper Becker, author of Hungry Ghosts: Mao's Secret Famine (1998), praised the book as a "brilliant work, backed by painstaking research ... . The archive material gathered by Dikötter ... confirms that far from being ignorant or misled about the famine, the Chinese leadership were kept informed about it all the time." Jonathan Fenby, author of The Penguin History of Modern China: The Fall and Rise of a Great Power, 1850–2009 (2009) and China Director at the research service Trusted Sources, praised Dikötter's "masterly book", and stated that his "painstaking research in newly opened local archives makes all too credible his estimate that the death toll reached 45 million people." Sinologist Roderick MacFarquhar said that the book is "Pathbreaking ... a first-class piece of research. ... [Mao] will be remembered as the ruler who initiated and presided over the worst man-made human catastrophe ever. His place in Chinese history is assured. Dikötter's book will have done much to put him there."

Jonathan Mirsky, a historian of China and journalist specialising in Asian affairs, wrote in Literary Review that Dikötter's book "is for now the best and last word on Mao's greatest horror. Frank Dikötter has put everyone in the field of Chinese studies in his debt, together with anyone else interested in the real China. Sooner or later the Chinese, too, will praise his name." About Mao's legacy in the book, Mirsky commented: "In terms of Mao's reputation this book leaves the chairman for dead, as a monster in the same league as Hitler and Stalin – and that is without considering the years of the Cultural Revolution (1966–76), when hundreds of thousands more Chinese died."

Steven Yearley, Professor of the Sociology of Scientific Knowledge at the University of Edinburgh, said that the book "stands out" from other works on the famine "on account of its basis in recently opened archives and in the countless compelling details which are provided to clarify the interlocking themes of the text."

George Mason University Law School professor Ilya Somin called the book "excellent", and stated that "Dikötter's study is not the first to describe these events. Nonetheless, few Western intellectuals are aware of the scale of these atrocities, and they have had almost no impact on popular consciousness. This is part of the more general problem of the neglect of communist crimes. But Chinese communist atrocities are little-known even by comparison to those inflicted by communists in Eastern Europe and the Soviet Union, possibly because the Chinese are more culturally distant from Westerners than are Eastern Europeans or the German victims of the Berlin Wall. Ironically, the Wall (one of communism's relatively smaller crimes) is vastly better known than the Great Leap Forward – the largest mass murder in all of world history. Hopefully, Dikötter's important work will help change that."

Essayist and novelist Pankaj Mishra wrote that the "narrative line is plausible" but Dikötter is "generally dismissive of facts that could blunt his story's sharp edge", and said that Dikötter's "comparison of the famine to the great evils of the Holocaust and the Gulag does not, finally, persuade", citing Amartya Sen's research on India, which compared unfavourably with China under Mao. Mishra added that Dikötter purposely omitted Mao's achievements in improving social stability, economic growth, and living standards by 1956, and made no attempt at people's history to contextualise the events and Chinese people's relations with Mao.

Journalist Aaron Leonard criticised Dikötter's failure to address the Great Chinese Famine in a larger historical context, and made no mention of pre-1949 famines in China under the Kuomintang regime. Leonard stated that "Dikötter looks at China under Communist rule in a narrow vacuum, thus dispensing with the inconvenient fact that famine in this part of the world has been a recurring phenomenon, which Mao did not invent or even magnify."

Cormac Ó Gráda, famine scholar and professor of economics at University College Dublin, criticised the book as "more like a catalogue of anecdotes about atrocities than a sustained analytic argument", and stated that it failed to note that "many of the horrors it describes were recurrent features of Chinese history during the previous century or so." Ó Gráda wrote that the "10 per thousand" normal mortality rate adopted by Dikötter is "implausibly low" and used to maximise his death count. Ó Gráda posited: "The crude death rate in China in the wake of the revolution was probably about 25 per thousand. It is highly unlikely that the Communists could have reduced it within less than a decade to the implausibly low 10 per thousand adopted here (p. 331). Had they done so, they would have 'saved' over 30 million lives in the interim! One can hardly have it both ways." China specialist historian Timothy Cheek wrote that Dikötter remained locked in a Mao-centered history. According to Cheek, the major limitation of Dikötter's work is the florid, "ohmy-gosh" tone that clouds sober reflection. He also wrote that Dikötter's overblown claims would "drive many a serious China scholar away." Andrew G. Walder wrote that Dikötter's high death estimate cannot be reconciled with age-specific population data.

In The China Journal, Felix Wemheuer, lecturer of Chinese history and politics at University of Vienna, said that Dikötter's figure of 45 million dead was higher than other estimates of 15 to 40 million dead, and commented: "It seems that his interest is in presenting the highest number possible, to label the Great Leap as the greatest mass killing in human history." Wemheuer stated the figure was derived from discrepancies between Cao Shuji's 2005 estimate of 32.5 million and data from official county police reports, to which Dikötter added 40–50 percent.

Wemheuer also disputed Dikötter's claims that 2.5 million and 1–3 million people were beaten to death and driven to suicide, respectively. Wemheuer criticised Dikötter's lack of mention of famines under Republican China, and wrote that Dikötter's account "reads like a long list of atrocities committed by Mao's regime against the Chinese people and bears the hallmarks of having been written in furious outrage." Dikötter defended the estimate of 45 million dead, citing other Chinese authors who had spent time in the party's archives, including journalist Yang Jisheng (36 million), economist Chen Yizi (43 million), and historian Yu Xiguang (55 million). Dikötter dismissed comparisons between the Great Chinese Famine and those under Republican China, positing that the latter were wartime disasters, while the former was a human-made disaster during times of peace, commenting: "There is a difference between starving to death and being starved to death."

Dikötter challenged the notion that Mao did not know about the famine throughout the country until it was too late as "largely a myth—at most partially true for the autumn of 1958 only." At a secret meeting in the Jinjiang Hotel in Shanghai dated 25 March 1959, Dikötter continues, Mao specifically ordered the party to procure up to one third of all the grain, and announced that "To distribute resources evenly will only ruin the Great Leap Forward. When there is not enough to eat, people starve to death. It is better to let half of the people die so that the other half can eat their fill." Thomas P. Bernstein of Columbia University offered his view that Mao's statement in the 25 March 1959, meeting was "an instance of Mao's use of hyperbole, another being his casual acceptance of death of half the population during a nuclear war." According to Bernstein, Mao did not in fact accept mass death. In October 1958, Mao expressed real concern that 40,000 people in Yunnan had starved to death and shortly after the 25 March meeting, he worried about 25.2 million people who were at risk of starvation. From late summer on, Mao forgot about this issue until the Xinyang Incident came to light in October 1960.

Anthony Garnaut, a social historian of China, posited that Dikötter's juxtaposition and sampling techniques fall short of academic best practice. According to Garnaut, the allegations Dikötter levels at Yang Jisheng's work ("At times it looks like a hotchpotch which simply strings together large chunks of text, some lifted from the Web, a few from published sources, and others transcribed from archival material.") are either sloppily drawn or disingenuous. According to Garnaut, Dikötter’s contribution is "to strip Yang’s archival discoveries and synthesis of published material of the historical context provided by Yang, and to rearrange the resulting fragments into an idiosyncratic vignette of totalitarian folly." Garnaut also wrote that Dikötter's interpretation of Mao's quotation ("It is better to let half of the people die so that the other half can eat their fill") not only ignores the substantial commentary on the conference by other scholars and several of its key participants but defies the very plain wording of the archival document in his possession on which he hangs his case. (Note: According to Garnaut, Mao's comment was thus: If we want to fulfil the plan, then we need to greatly reduce the number of projects. We need to be resolute in further cutting the 1,078 major projects down to 500. (要完成计划，就要大減项目。 1078个项目中还应該堅決地再多削減，削到500个。) To distribute resources evenly is a way to sabotage the Great Leap Forward. (平均使用力量是破坏大跃进的办法。) If all are unable to eat their fill, then all will die. It is better for half to die, so that half of the people can eat their fill. (大家吃不飽，大家死，不如死一半，給一半人吃飽。 )) According to Garnaut, people whom Mao was saying turn out to be a metaphor of large-scale industrial projects, and Mao's saying seems not mean pushing to extract more resources out of the countryside to feed industry. Mao's quotation "let half the people die" is also quoted in the introduction of the book by Zhou Xun, who is Dikötter's collaborator. Zhou's book provides extracts of the documents Dikötter refers to. According to Zhou, Dikötter's book "makes a key contribution to our understanding of how, why, and what happened during the Great Famine in China." Dikötter responded to Garnaut, saying that "if [Granaut] is right and it was no more than a metaphor, just what kind of metaphor was this? I have never heard of it before, unlike, say, 'kill a chicken to scare the monkey'. And what kind of metaphor would 'let half the people die' be, right in the middle of mass starvation? The conference was convened to address a collapsing economy and the mounting famine. If it is merely a form of hyperbole, then it is, to say the least, a strange one." There is a discussion about interpretation of Mao's quotation in the H-PRC section of the H-Net. Dikötter posited that it is not a metaphor, commenting that "so much sinological energy spent on one sentence, it leaves one slightly bemused." Shen Zhihua, historian of Sino-Soviet relations, also pointed out that Dikotter's quotation was out of context. Warren Sun, Chinese Studies specialist at Monash University, criticised Dikötter for having deliberately distorted documentary evidence about Mao's saying, calling Dikötter's work is "fraud".

Gao Mobo criticized Dikötter, writing "Instead of analyzing policy and organizational failures such as overly large communes that led to supervision failure, information failure such as the difficulty of knowing what was actually happening on the ground in time to address the problems before it was too late, and mass movement actions driven by political passion for experimentation, Dikötter focuses on isolated facts during the GLF, such as some houses being dismantled for the purpose of collecting fertile soil in some places, and violence against villagers by some local official thugs. [...] For Dikötter, it does not matter whether what he describes happened in other places of China: what matters is the construction of a typical GLF."

Mao's biographer Philip Short wrote that "Dikötter's errors are strangely consistent. They all serve to strengthen his case against Mao and his fellow leaders." About Dikötter's errors and misleading comments, Short said the main problem of Dikötter's book is that it does not offer credible explanation of why Mao and his colleagues acted as they did. Noticing that other parts of Mao's remark ("If we want to fulfil the plan, then we need greatly to reduce the number of projects. We need to be resolute in further cutting the 1,078 major projects down to 500") are omitted from both Dikötter's and Zhou's works, Short posited that Dikötter's book "set out to make the case for the prosecution, rather than providing balanced accounts of the periods they describe."

== Famine image on the book cover ==
Adam Jones, political science and genocide studies professor at UBC Okanagan, criticised Bloomsbury Publishing for using a cover photograph on their editions of the book of a starving child that was from a Life depiction of a 1946 Chinese famine. Jones said that the majority of book covers "are designed by the publisher, often using stock images, rather than by the author", but also accepted a blogger's point that it was unlikely that Dikötter would have been unaware of the deception because Dikötter had stated in an interview with Newsweek that, to his knowledge, no non-propaganda images from the Great Leap Forward had ever been found. The Walker & Company edition of the book has a different cover, using a 1962 image of Chinese refugees to Hong Kong begging for food as they are deported back to China.

== Awards and honours ==
The book won the Samuel Johnson Prize in 2011 for being what the judges characterised as "stunningly original and hugely important". The £20,000 award is the largest in the United Kingdom for a non-fiction book.

Historian and journalist Ben Macintyre, one of the judges for the Samuel Johnson Prize, said that Mao's Great Famine was a "meticulous account of a brutal man-made calamity [that] is essential reading for anyone seeking to understand the history of the 20th century." He added that the book "could have been overwritten, but part of what makes it work so well is it is written with quiet fury. He doesn't overstate his case because he doesn't need to. Its very strength lies in its depth of scholarship, lightly worn." Writer Brenda Maddox, another of the judges for the prize, said that "this book changed my life – I think differently about the 20th century than I did before. Why didn't I know about this?"

== Documentary ==
Mao's Great Famine was directed by Patrick Cabouat and Philippe Grangereau in 2012. It featured Dikötter as well as oral testimonies from survivors across China that Zhou has interviewed in 4 years.

== See also ==
- Great Leap Forward
- Lysenkoism
- Neo-Stalinism
- Stalinism
