= Yang Jisheng (journalist) =

Chinese journalist and author

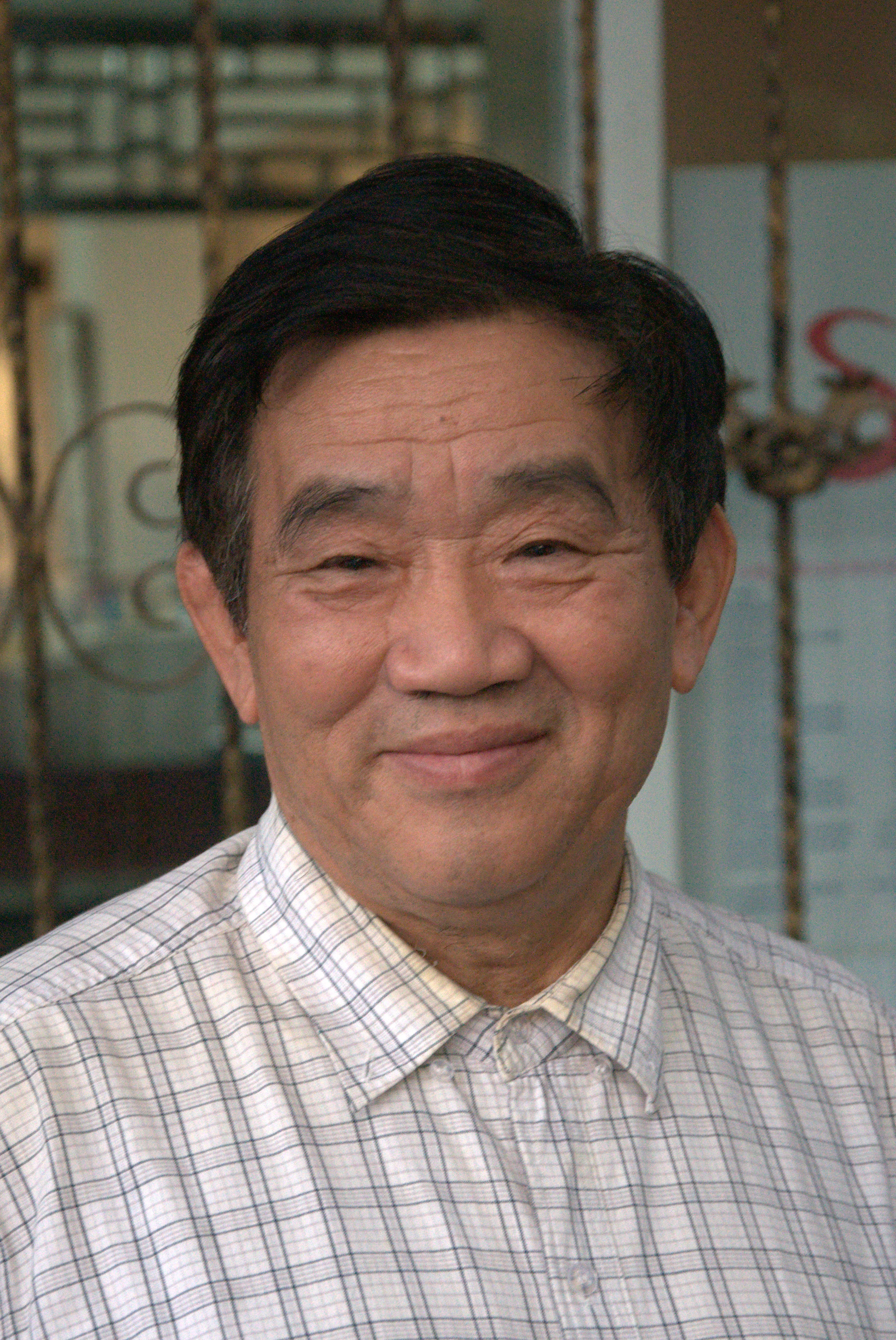
- Yang Jisheng in 2010
- Traditional Chinese: 楊繼繩
- Simplified Chinese: 杨继绳
Transcriptions
Standard Mandarin
- Hanyu Pinyin: Yáng Jìshéng

Yang Jisheng (born November 1940) is a Chinese journalist and author. His work include Tombstone (墓碑), a comprehensive account of the Great Chinese Famine during the Great Leap Forward, and The World Turned Upside Down (天地翻覆), a history of the Cultural Revolution. Yang joined the Communist Party in 1964 and graduated from Tsinghua University in 1966. He promptly joined Xinhua News Agency, where he worked until his retirement in 2001.

Although he continued working for the Xinhua News Agency, he spent much of his time researching for Tombstone. Yang used his role at the state-run Xinhua news agency to access provincial archives, beginning covert research on the Great Famine in the mid-1990s. Over a decade he studied grain policies to compile the first detailed account of the famine using Chinese government sources. As of 2008, he was the deputy editor of the journal Yanhuang Chunqiu in Beijing. Yang is also listed as a Fellow of China Media Project, a department under Hong Kong University.

== Work ==
=== Tombstone: The Great Famine ===
The Great Famine, which began in the late 1950s and claimed millions of lives across China, struck Yang Jisheng's family while he was away at boarding school. At 18, while working on a Communist Youth League newspaper, Yang was told by a friend that his father (actually his uncle, whom he regarded as a father) was starving. When he returned home, he found a desolate village—no animals remained, and even tree bark had been eaten. Although he brought rice for his father, Yang's efforts were in vain, as his father was too weak to eat and passed away three days later. "I didn't think my father's death was the country's fault. I thought it was my fault. If I hadn't gone to school, but had helped him dig up his crops, he wouldn't have died." Beginning in the early 1990s, Yang began interviewing people and collecting records of the Great Chinese Famine of 1959–1961, in which his own foster father had died, eventually accumulating ten million words of records. He published a two-volume 1,208-page account of the period, in which he aimed to produce an account that is authoritative and can stand up to the challenge of official denial by the Chinese government. He begins the book, "I call this book Tombstone. It is a tombstone for my [foster] father who died of hunger in 1959, for the 36 million Chinese who also died of hunger, for the system that caused their death, and perhaps for myself for writing this book." "'At first when I was writing this book, it was difficult. But then I became numb. When you are writing history, you can't be too emotional. You need to be calm and objective,' he says. 'But I was angry the whole time. I'm still angry.'" The book was published in Hong Kong and is banned in mainland China. Counterfeit copies of his book, along with photocopies and electronic versions, circulate widely, but Yang is unconcerned about copyright—his only wish is for the Chinese people to know their own history. "Our history is all fabricated. It's been covered up. If a country can't face its own history, then it has no future." In 2012 translations into French, German, and English (which has been condensed almost by 50%) have been published. He was reported to be banned from leaving China to receive the award in a ceremony in Harvard University to be held in March 2016.

==== Reception ====
Yang was awarded The Stieg Larsson prize 2015 for his "stubborn and courageous work in mapping and describing the consequences" of The Great Leap Forward. Yang was awarded the 2016 Louis M. Lyons Award for Conscience and Integrity in Journalism, selected by the Nieman Fellows at Harvard University. In the award citation, the fellows stated: "Through the determination and commitment required for this project, Mr. Yang clearly demonstrates the qualities of conscience and integrity. He provides inspiration to all who seek to document the truth in the face of influences, forces and regimes that may push against such transparency."

Sun Jingxian, a Chinese mathematician, saw in the book a direct attack of China's political system asserting that Yang had done that by committing a distorted historical investigation. He argued that Yang made serious methodological errors in his assumption that starvation deaths could be calculated by looking at the difference between the average number of deaths for a given period and the actual number of deaths for that same year. Sun believed that this was an absurd mathematical formula and he called the book "extremely deceptive", characterizing it as faulty, inadequate and even fraudulent. In an academic paper, Sun wrote:

As a professional mathematician [...] we must seriously point out that from an academic point of view, [Yang's methodology] completely violates the basic principles that modern mathematics must follow when dealing with such problems.

Additionally, political scientist and historian Yang Songlin disputes several of Yang Jisheng's claims, such as that the Chinese government under-reported deaths or manipulated data.

Economic historian Cormac Ó Gráda, reviewing the book, stated that: "Yang tends to neglect the famine historical context and China's economic vulnerability". He notes that China was the "land of famine" because it was extremely poor and, in the 1950s, China was still extremely poor. Ó Gráda also asserts that Yang's estimate of 40 million fewer births is excessive. Yang strongly dismissed these criticisms, arguing that the sources about population loss were reliable and accused Sun Jingxian of lacking basic knowledge about the Chinese household registration system at that time. Historian Anne Applebaum praised the book as being "the definitive account of the Great Famine".

=== The World Turned Upside Down: A History of the Chinese Cultural Revolution ===
Following the publication of Tombstone, Yang began to research the Cultural Revolution, the result of which was The World Turned Upside Down. Yang criticises the official portrayal of the Cultural Revolution, asserting that Mao actually "fully intended to topple enemies in the bureaucratic clique who stood in the way of his utopia" but later "abandoned the rebels and restored the purged bureaucratic clique". Yang also critiques the narrative that Liu Shaoqi was a mere passive victim of the reprisals of the era rather than a participant in the power struggle, and asserts that the hardships created by the bureaucracy vastly exceeded those created by the rebel faction.

== Awards ==
- 2013 Hayek Book Prize and Lecture by the Manhattan Institute for Policy Research.
- 2015 Stieg Larsson Prize

"for his stubborn and courageous work in mapping and describing the consequences of The Three Years of Great Chinese Famine"

- 2015 Award from the Independent Chinese PEN Center (for the Chinese language version)
- 2016 Louis M. Lyons Award for Conscience and Integrity in Journalism

== Published works ==
- 墓碑 －－中國六十年代大饑荒紀實 (Mubei – - Zhongguo Liushi Niandai Da Jihuang Jishi) ("Tombstone: An Account of Chinese Famine in the 1960s"), Hong Kong: Cosmos Books (Tiandi Tushu), 2008, ISBN 978-988-211-909-3 (in Chinese). By 2010, it was appearing under the title: 墓碑: 一九五八-一九六二年中國大饑荒紀實 (Mubei: Yi Jiu Wu Ba – Yi Jiu Liu Er Nian Zhongguo Da Jihuang Shiji) ("Tombstone: An Account of Chinese Famine From 1958–1962").
  - Tombstone: The Untold Story of Mao's Great Famine, trans. Stacy Mosher and Guo Jian, Publisher: Allen Lane (2012), ISBN 978-184-614-518-6 (English Translation of the above work)
- 天地翻覆——中国文化大革命史, ISBN 978-988-8258-36-9
  - The World Turned Upside Down: A History of the Chinese Cultural Revolution, English translation of above book, translated and edited by Stacy Mosher and Guo Jian, New York: Farrar, Straus and Giroux (2021), ISBN 9780374293130.
  - "Renverser ciel et terre - La tragédie de la Révolution culturelle, 1966–1976, French translation of 天地翻覆 by Louis Vincenolles, Éditions du Seuil, 2020, ISBN 978-2-02-133118-9

== See also ==
- Hungry Ghosts: Mao's Secret Famine
- Mao's Great Famine
