= Pankaj Mishra =

Indian writer (born 1969)

Pankaj Mishra FRSL
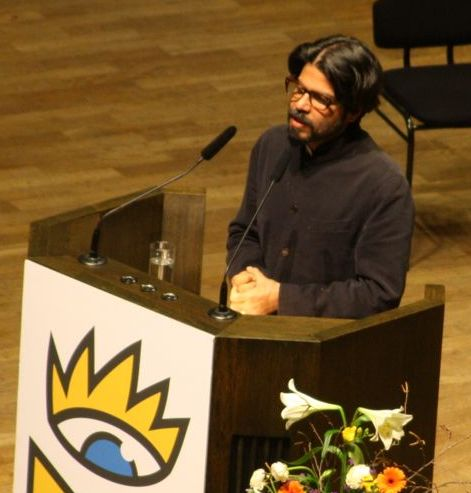
- Mishra in Leipzig, March 2014
- Born: 9 February 1969 (age 57); Jhansi, Uttar Pradesh, India
- Education: Jawaharlal Nehru University; University of Allahabad
- Known for: The Romantics; From the Ruins of Empire; Age of Anger
- Awards: 2000 Art Seidenbaum award for Best First Fiction; 2013 Crossword Book Award (nonfiction); 2014 Windham–Campbell Literature Prize
- Website: pankajmishra.com

Pankaj Mishra FRSL (born 9 February 1969) is an Indian essayist, novelist, and socialist. His non-fiction works include The World After Gaza, Temptations of the West: How to Be Modern in India, Pakistan, Tibet, and Beyond, along with From the Ruins of Empire: The Intellectuals Who Remade Asia, and A Great Clamour: Encounters with China and Its Neighbours, and he has published two novels. He is a prolific contributor to periodicals such as The Guardian, Harper's Magazine, the New York Times, The New Yorker and the New York Review of Books and was previously a Bloomberg Opinion columnist. His writings have led to a number of controversies, including disputes with Salil Tripathi, Niall Ferguson, and Jordan Peterson. He was awarded the Windham–Campbell Prize for non-fiction in 2014 and the Weston International Award in 2024.

== Early life and education ==
Mishra was born in Jhansi, India. His father, A.K. Mishra, worked as a track maintenance manager for Indian Railways and was active in the trade union movement. He came from a once-prosperous Brahmin family that was impoverished by post-independence land redistribution.

Mishra graduated with a bachelor's degree in commerce from the University of Allahabad before earning his Master of Arts degree in English literature at Jawaharlal Nehru University in New Delhi.

== Career ==
In 1992, Mishra moved to Mashobra, a Himalayan town in Himachal Pradesh, India, where he began to contribute literary essays and reviews to The Indian Review of Books, The India Magazine, and the newspaper The Pioneer. His first book, Butter Chicken in Ludhiana: Travels in Small Town India (1995), set in Ludhiana, Punjab, India, was a travelogue that described the social and cultural changes in India in the context of globalization. His novel The Romantics (2000), an ironic tale of people longing for fulfilment in cultures other than their own, was published in 11 European languages and won the Los Angeles Times Art Seidenbaum award for first fiction. This novel, with some autobiographical strains, is a bildungsroman. The narrative begins with the nineteen-year-old protagonist Samar coming to the city of Varanasi from Prayagraj. A large part of the novel, including its end, is set in Varanasi. Gradually, Samar realizes that the city is a site for mystery.

Mishra's book An End to Suffering: The Buddha in the World (2004) mixes memoir, history, and philosophy while attempting to explore the Buddha's relevance to contemporary times. Temptations of the West: How to Be Modern in India, Pakistan and Beyond (2006), describes Mishra's travels through Kashmir, Bollywood, Afghanistan, Tibet, Nepal, and other parts of South and Central Asia. Responding in The Guardian to an article by Mishra in connection with this work, Salil Tripathi criticised Mishra's defence of Indian and Chinese economic policies from the period 1950–80, claiming that they had stifled economic growth. Mishra's 2012 book, From the Ruins of Empire, examines the question of "how to find a place of dignity for oneself in this world created by the West, in which the West and its allies in the non-West had reserved the best positions for themselves."

Mishra has written literary and political essays for the New York Times, where he was a Bookends columnist, the New York Review of Books, The Guardian, the London Review of Books, and The New Yorker, among other publications. He is a columnist for Bloomberg View and the New York Times Book Review. His work has also appeared in Foreign Affairs, Foreign Policy, The Boston Globe, Common Knowledge, the Financial Times, Granta, The Independent, The New Republic, the New Statesman, the Wall Street Journal, n+1, The Nation, Outlook, Poetry, Time magazine, the Times Literary Supplement, Travel + Leisure, and the Washington Post. In 2025, Mishra co-founded the magazine Equator.

He was the Visiting Fellow for 2007–08 at the Department of English, University College London, UK. He was elected a Fellow of the Royal Society of Literature in 2008. In November 2012, Foreign Policy magazine named him one of the top 100 global thinkers. In February 2015, Prospect nominated him to its list of 50 World Thinkers.

In 2011, Niall Ferguson threatened to sue Mishra for libel after Mishra published a review of his book Civilisation: The West and the Rest in the London Review of Books. Ferguson claimed that Mishra accused him of racism.

In March 2014, Yale University awarded Mishra the Windham–Campbell Literature Prize.

In an article published on 19 March 2018 in the New York Review of Books titled "Jordan Peterson & Fascist Mysticism", Mishra wrote that Canadian clinical psychologist and author Jordan Peterson's activities with Charles Joseph, a native member of the coastal Pacific Kwakwakaʼwakw tribe in Canada, "... may seem the latest in a long line of eggheads pretentiously but harmlessly romancing the noble savage." Peterson perceived Mishra's use of the phrase "romancing the noble savage" as a racist insult to his friend Joseph, and his response via Twitter, which included a threat of violence to Mishra, went viral.

Run and Hide, Mishra's first novel in 20 years, was published in 2022 to a generally positive reception, with Allan Massie in The Scotsman concluding: "This is a wonderfully rich and enjoyable novel. It is very much, and disturbingly, of our time.... Intellect, observation memory, sympathy and imagination are all happily here. The novel can be read quickly for sheer pleasure. It is a work for our time and one that will surely be read many years on for what will then be its historical interest. So: a novel built to last."

In March 2024, the London Review of Books published a 7503 word article by Mishra under the title "The Shoah After Gaza." The article has been considered seminal and influential amongst long-form entries in the discussion and debate around the meaning and implications of the Israel-Hamas War, becoming the basis for Mishra's work The World After Gaza whose jacket-copy describes the book as "an essential reckoning with the war in Gaza." The work garnered a wave of institutional attention and promotion, also igniting a firestorm of intensive criticism.

== Personal life ==
Mishra married Mary Mount, a London book editor, in 2005. She is the daughter of the writer Sir Ferdinand Mount, 3rd Baronet, and a cousin of former Prime Minister of the United Kingdom David Cameron. Mishra has been critical of Cameron's politics and has stated "It may seem to people like we're having dinner together practically every night, but I've never met the man; my wife has met him once in her life. Neither of us share his politics", calling Cameron "a ghastly figure".

== Awards and recognition ==
- 2000: Art Seidenbaum award for Best First Fiction
- 2013: Crossword Book Award (nonfiction) for From the Ruins of Empire.
- 2014: Leipzig Book Award for European Understanding for From the Ruins of Empire
- 2014: Windham–Campbell Literature Prize (Nonfiction), valued at $150,000 one of the largest prizes in the world of its kind.
- 2014: Premi Internacional D'Assaig Josep Palau i Fabre
- 2024: Weston International Award.

== Bibliography ==
=== Books ===
- Butter Chicken in Ludhiana: Travels in Small Town India (1995)
- The Romantics (2000)
- An End to Suffering: the Buddha in the World (2004)
- India in Mind, edited by Pankaj Mishra (2005)
- Temptations of the West: How to Be Modern in India, Pakistan, Tibet, and Beyond (2006)
- From the Ruins of Empire: The Intellectuals Who Remade Asia (2012)
- A Great Clamour: Encounters with China and Its Neighbours (2013)
- Age of Anger: A History of the Present (2017), ISBN 9780374274788
- Bland Fanatics: Liberals, Race, and Empire (2020), ISBN 9780374293314
- Run and Hide (2022), ISBN 9780374607524
- The World After Gaza (2025), ISBN 9798217058891

=== Book chapters ===
- Introduction to Kashmir: The Case for Freedom (2011)

=== Essays and reporting ===
- Mishra, Pankaj. (9 April 1998). "Edmund Wilson in Benares", The New York Review of Books.
- — (24 June 2004). "The Invention of the Hindu", Axess Magazine.
- — (25 November 2013). "Land and Blood: The Origins of the Second World War in Asia". The Critics. Books. The New Yorker. Vol. 89, no. 38. pp. 121–126.
- — (4 August 2014). "The Places in Between: The Struggle to Define Indonesia". The Critics. Books. The New Yorker. Vol. 90, no. 22. pp. 64–69.
- — (19 March 2018). "Jordan Peterson and Fascist Mysticism". NYR Daily. The New York Review of Books.
- — (16 July 2020). "Anglo-America Loses Its Grip". The London Review of Books.
- — (19 November 2020). "Grand Illusions." The New York Review of Books. 67 (18): 31–32. Essay.
- The Shoah after Gaza. London Review of Books, Winter Lecture, 28 February 2024.
- Speaking Reassurance to Power. Harper's Magazine, August 2025.
- The End of the Belle Époque. Harper's Magazine, October 2025.

=== Public lecture ===
- Mishra, Pankaj (16, September 2024). "The Last Days of Mankind", N+1 Magazine

=== Book reviews ===
Year	Review article	Work(s) reviewed
2007	Mishra, Pankaj (28 June 2007). "Impasse in India". The New York Review of Books. Vol. 54, no. 11. pp. 48–51.	Nussbaum, Martha (2007). The Clash Within: Democracy, Religious Violence, and India's Future. Belknap Press. ISBN 978-0674024823.
2017	Mishra, Pankaj (21 December 2017). "God's Oppressed Children". The New York Review of Books. Vol. 64, no. 20.	Gidla, Sujatha (2017). Ants Among Elephants: An Untouchable Family and the Making of Modern India. Farrar, Straus and Giroux. ISBN 978-0865478114.
2019	Mishra, Pankaj (18 July 2019). "A Long & Undeclared Emergency". The New York Review of Books. Vol. 66, no. 12. pp. 32–35.	Prakash, Gyan (2019). Emergency Chronicles: Indira Gandhi and Democracy's Turning Point. Princeton University Press. ISBN 978-0691190006.
2023	Mishra, Pankaj (2 November 2023). "When the Barbarians Take Over". The New York Review of Books. Vol. 70, no. 17. pp. 8–12.	Wittstock, Uwe (2023). "Translated by Daniel Bowles". February 1933: The Winter of Literature. Polity. ISBN 978-1509553792.

== See also ==
- List of Indian writers
