= Michael Schoenhals =

Swedish sinologist

Michael Schoenhals (born 1953) is a Swedish sinologist, specializing in the society of modern China. He is Professor Emeritus of Chinese Studies at Lund University.

The book Mao's Last Revolution by Roderick MacFarquhar and Michael Schoenhals is considered the seminal work on the Cultural Revolution.

== Analysis ==
In his analysis of the Cultural Revolution, Schoenhals writes that one of the most striking features of the era is the flourishing of publications by "revolutionary mass organizations" in 1966 and 1967, reflecting a plurality of values and opinions in society at odds with conventional stereotypes about Red Guards.

Publishing in 1992, Schoenhals contended that if all fora, including private conversation, are compared, political discourse in China "is probably no more restricted with respect to content than political discourse in the United States or the former Soviet Union."

== Selected bibliography ==
- Saltationist Socialism: Mao Zedong and the Great Leap Forward 1958 (1987)
- Doing Things with Words in Chinese Politics: Five Studies (1992)
- China's Cultural Revolution, 1966-1969: Not a Dinner Party (1996)
- "The Central Case Examination Group, 1966-79." China Quarterly, no. 145 (1996): 87-111.
- Mao's Last Revolution (2006) with Roderick MacFarquhar
- Spying for the People: Mao's Secret Agents, 1949-1967 (2012)
