= Mao's Last Revolution =

2006 book by MacFarquhar and Schoenhals

- Author: Roderick MacFarquhar; Michael Schoenhals
- Language: English
- Subject: Cultural Revolution
- Genre: Non-fiction
- Publisher: Belknap Press
- Publication date: 2006
- Website: Mao's Last Revolution at the Internet Archive

Mao's Last Revolution is a 2006 book by Roderick MacFarquhar and Michael Schoenhals released by Belknap Press.

Harvard University Press presented it as "[MacFarquhar and Schoenhals] explain why Mao Zedong launched the Cultural Revolution, and show his Machiavellian role in masterminding it (which Chinese publications conceal)."

== Reception ==
Mao's Last Revolution is considered the seminal work on the Cultural Revolution in China 1966−1976.

Judith Shapiro wrote in The New York Times in 2006 that it "provides a detailed account of the salvos, currents, countercurrents, conspiracies, waves, cleansings and purges for which the era is known." She called it an "important first effort to establish the facts", "the first major history of the elite politics of the period" and that it may "encourage healthy debate over state manipulation of historical memory".

Later, Michael Schoenhals emphasised the importance of consulting the original Chinese text rather than relying solely on existing translations, with an example of an alleged mistranslation of Mao's remark "越杀人就越要革命" as "the more people you kill, the more revolutionary you" in Mao's Last Revolution. According to Schoenhals, a more appropriate translation is "The greater the number of people murdered, the greater the wish [on the part of the survivors] for a revolution."
