= Roderick MacFarquhar =

British sinologist and politician (1930–2019)

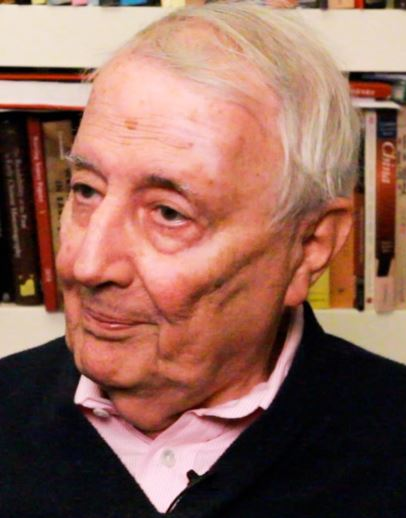

Member of Parliament of the United Kingdom
- In office 28 February 1974 – 7 April 1979
- Preceded by: Geoffrey Stewart-Smith
- Succeeded by: Sheila Faith
- Constituency: Belper

Personal details
- Born: Roderick Lemonde MacFarquhar; 2 December 1930 Lahore, British India
- Died: 10 February 2019 (aged 88) Cambridge, Massachusetts, U.S.
- Party: Labour (before 1981)
- Other political affiliations: SDP (1980s)
- Spouses: Emily Cohen (m. 1964; died 2001) Dalena Wright (m. 2012)
- Children: 2, including Larissa
- Education: Keble College, Oxford (BA); Harvard University (MA); London School of Economics (PhD)

Philosophical work
- Institutions: Harvard University; School of Oriental and African Studies; Columbia University; Oxford University
- Main interests: Modern Chinese history

Roderick Lemonde MacFarquhar (2 December 1930 – 10 February 2019) was a British sinologist, politician, and journalist.

MacFarquhar was founding editor of China Quarterly in 1959. He served as a Member of Parliament in the 1970s, then joined the BBC. In the 1980s, he became a professor at Harvard University, where he served several terms as director of the Fairbank Center for Chinese Studies. He was best known for his studies of Maoist China, the three-volume The Origins of the Cultural Revolution and Mao's Last Revolution.

== Family and early life ==
MacFarquhar was born in Lahore, British India (now Pakistan). His father was Sir Alexander MacFarquhar, a member of the Indian Civil Service and later a senior diplomat at the United Nations. His mother was Berenice (née Whitburn). He was educated at the Aitchison College in Lahore and Fettes College, an independent school in Edinburgh.

== Academic and journalistic career ==
After spending part of his national service from 1949 to 1950 in Egypt and Jordan as a second lieutenant in the Royal Tank Regiment, he went up to Keble College, Oxford to read Philosophy, Politics and Economics, obtaining a BA in 1953. He then went on to obtain a master's degree from Harvard University in Far Eastern Regional Studies in 1955, studying with John King Fairbank, who supported his career as a China scholar.

He worked as a journalist on the staff of the Daily Telegraph and Sunday Telegraph from 1955 to 1961 specialising in China, and also reported for BBC television Panorama from 1963 to 1965. He was the founding editor of The China Quarterly from 1959 to 1968, and a non-resident fellow of St Antony's College, Oxford, from 1965 to 1968. In 1969 he was a senior research fellow at Columbia University in New York City, and in 1971 he returned to England to hold a similar fellowship at the Royal Institute of International Affairs. MacFarquhar completed his doctorate at the London School of Economics in 1981.

== Political career ==
In the 1966 general election, MacFarquhar fought the Ealing South constituency for the Labour Party but failed to dislodge the sitting Conservative MP. Two years later, he was Labour candidate who attempted to retain the Meriden seat in a by-election; he was on the wrong end of an 18.4% swing at the height of the Wilson government's unpopularity.

Following the defeat of George Brown in 1970 and favourable boundary changes, MacFarquhar was selected to fight the Belper constituency, and at the February 1974 general election succeeded in winning the seat from its sitting Conservative MP Geoffrey Stewart-Smith. Although he won, there was an estimated swing of 4% to the Conservatives had the same boundaries applied in the previous election.

MacFarquhar proved a moderate figure, in line with Brown's views. He abstained on a vote to remove the disqualification of left-wing Labour councillors in Clay Cross who had broken council housing laws enacted by the previous Conservative government. However, there were exceptions: he also abstained on a vote to increase the Civil list payments on 26 February 1975. He acted as Parliamentary Private Secretary (PPS) to David Ennals, a minister of the state at the Foreign and Commonwealth Office, and retained the job when Ennals was promoted to be Secretary of State for Social Services. He was a member of the Select Committee on Science and Technology.

== After Parliament ==
In 1978 MacFarquhar resigned his office as PPS after voting against the Government. In that year, he became a Governor of the School of Oriental and African Studies, a University of London constituent body. The post gave him a job which he could do if he lost his seat. In the 1979 general election, MacFarquhar did indeed lose by 800 votes, and returned to academia and broadcasting (returning to "24 Hours" for a year).

He remained involved in politics and his moderate beliefs made him increasingly uncomfortable in the Labour Party: on 22 October 1981 he announced that he had joined the Social Democratic Party. He fought the South Derbyshire seat, which contained most of then-abolished Belper, for the SDP in the 1983 general election, and nearly succeeded in beating the Labour candidate, although the seat was easily won by the Conservatives.

== Subsequent academic career ==
He was a fellow of the Woodrow Wilson International Center for Scholars in Washington D.C. in 1980-81 and the American Academy of Arts and Sciences since 1986. In 1980–1983, he was a Leverhulme Research Fellow from 1980 until 1983.

In 1986–1992, MacFarquhar was Director of the Fairbank Center for Chinese Studies at Harvard University. He was a Walter Channing Cabot Fellow at Harvard in 1993–1994. He was the Leroy B. Williams Professor of History and Political Science, Emeritus.

He was a scholar of Chinese politics from the founding of the People's Republic through to the Cultural Revolution. Volume three of his study The Origins of the Cultural Revolution: The Coming of the Cataclysm 1961-1966 (1997) won the Joseph Levenson Book Prize for 1999.

In a statistical overview derived from writings by and about Roderick MacFarquhar, OCLC/WorldCat encompasses roughly 140+ works in 330+ publications in 11 languages and 15,700+ library holdings

== Personal life ==
MacFarquhar married Emily Cohen, a journalist and East Asian studies scholar, in 1964. They had two children, the writer Larissa MacFarquhar and economist Rory MacFarquhar, who served as policy adviser in the Obama administration. His first wife died in 2001. He married his second wife, British foreign policy scholar Dalena Wright, in 2012.

MacFarquhar died from heart failure at a hospital in Cambridge, Massachusetts on 10 February 2019, at age 88.

== Bibliography ==
=== Books ===
- The Hundred Flowers Campaign and the Chinese intellectuals. 1960.
- China Under Mao: Politics Takes Command (1963)
- Chinese ambitions and British policy Fabian tract (1966)
- Sino-American Relations: 1949-1971 (1972)
- The Forbidden City (1972)
- The Origins of the Cultural Revolution - 1. Contradictions Among the People, 1956-1957 (1974)
- The Origins of the Cultural Revolution - 2. The Great Leap Forward, 1958-1960 (1983)
- The People's Republic: The Emergence of Revolutionary China, 1949-1965 (1987)
- The Secret Speeches of Chairman Mao: From the Hundred Flowers to the Great Leap Forward (1989)
- The Politics of China, 1949-1989 (1993)
- Towards a New World Order (1993)
- The Politics of China: The Eras of Mao and Deng (1997)
- The Origins of the Cultural Revolution - 3. The Coming of the Cataclysm, 1961-1966 (1997)
- The Paradox of China's Post-Mao Reforms (1999)
- Mao's Last Revolution (2006), with Michael Schoenhals, Belknap Press of Harvard University Press, Cambridge, Massachusetts, ISBN 9780674023321.
- The Politics of China: Sixty Years of The People's Republic of China (2011)

=== Book reviews ===
Year	Review article	Work(s) reviewed
2007	MacFarquhar, Roderick (28 June 2007). "Mission to Mao". The New York Review of Books. 54 (11): 67–71.	MacMillan, Margaret (2007). Nixon and Mao : the week that changed the world. Random House.

== Notes ==
Parliament of the United Kingdom
Preceded by Geoffrey Stewart-Smith	Member of Parliament for Belper; February 1974–1979	Succeeded by Sheila Faith
