= History of the People's Republic of China =

On 1 October 1949 CCP chairman Mao Zedong proclaimed the People's Republic of China (PRC) from atop Tiananmen, after a near complete victory (1949) by the Chinese Communist Party (CCP) in the Chinese Civil War. The PRC is the most recent political entity to govern mainland China, preceded by the Republic of China (ROC; 1912–1949) and thousands of years of monarchical dynasties. The paramount leaders have been Mao Zedong (1949–1976); Hua Guofeng (1976–1978); Deng Xiaoping (1978–1989); Jiang Zemin (1989–2002); Hu Jintao (2002–2012); and Xi Jinping (2012 to present).

The origins of the People's Republic can be traced to the Chinese Soviet Republic proclaimed in 1931, with the backing of the Communist Party of the Soviet Union, which included the Jiangxi and Yan'an Soviets, in the midst of the Chinese Civil War against the Nationalist government only to dissolve in 1937. By 1949, the CCP took control of most of mainland China, and the ROC government retreated offshore to Taiwan. In 1950, the PRC captured Hainan from the ROC and annexed Tibet.

The CCP consolidated its popularity among the peasants through the Land Reform Movement, which included the state-tolerated executions of between 1 and 2 million landlords by peasants and former tenants. Though the PRC initially allied closely with the Soviet Union, the relations between the two communist nations gradually deteriorated, leading China to develop an independent industrial system and its own nuclear weapons. The Chinese population increased from 550 million in 1950 to 900 million in 1974. However, the Great Leap Forward, a massive industrialization project, resulted in an estimated 15 to 55 million deaths between 1959 and 1961, mostly from starvation. In 1964, China detonated its first atomic bomb. In 1966, Mao and his allies launched the Cultural Revolution, sparking a decade of political recrimination and social upheaval that lasted until Mao's death in 1976.

After Mao's death, the Gang of Four were arrested by Hua Guofeng and held responsible for the Cultural Revolution. The Cultural Revolution was rebuked, with millions rehabilitated. Deng Xiaoping took power in 1978, and started the reform and opening up, instituting large-scale political and economic reforms, together with the "Eight Elders", most senior and influential members of the party. The economic reforms marked China's transition away from planned economy. China adopted its current constitution on 4 December 1982. In 1989, there were protests such those in Tiananmen Square, and then throughout the entire nation. Jiang Zemin was elevated to become the CCP general secretary, becoming the paramount leader. China's economy grew sevenfold during this time. British Hong Kong and Portuguese Macau returned to China in 1997 and 1999, respectively, as special administrative regions under the principle of one country, two systems. The country joined the World Trade Organization in 2001.

In 2002, Hu Jintao succeeded Jiang as the general secretary. Under Hu, China maintained its high rate of economic growth, overtaking the United Kingdom, France, Germany and Japan to become the world's second-largest economy. However, the growth also severely impacted the country's resources and environment, and caused major social displacement. Xi Jinping succeeded as paramount leader in 2012. Shortly after his ascension to power, Xi launched a vast anti-corruption crackdown, that prosecuted more than 2 million officials by 2022. During his tenure, Xi has consolidated power unseen since the initiation of economic and political reforms. In the 21st century, its new wealth and technology led to a contest for primacy in Asian affairs versus India, Japan and the United States, and since 2018 a growing trade war with the United States.

== Mao era (1949–1976) ==
=== Socialist transformation ===
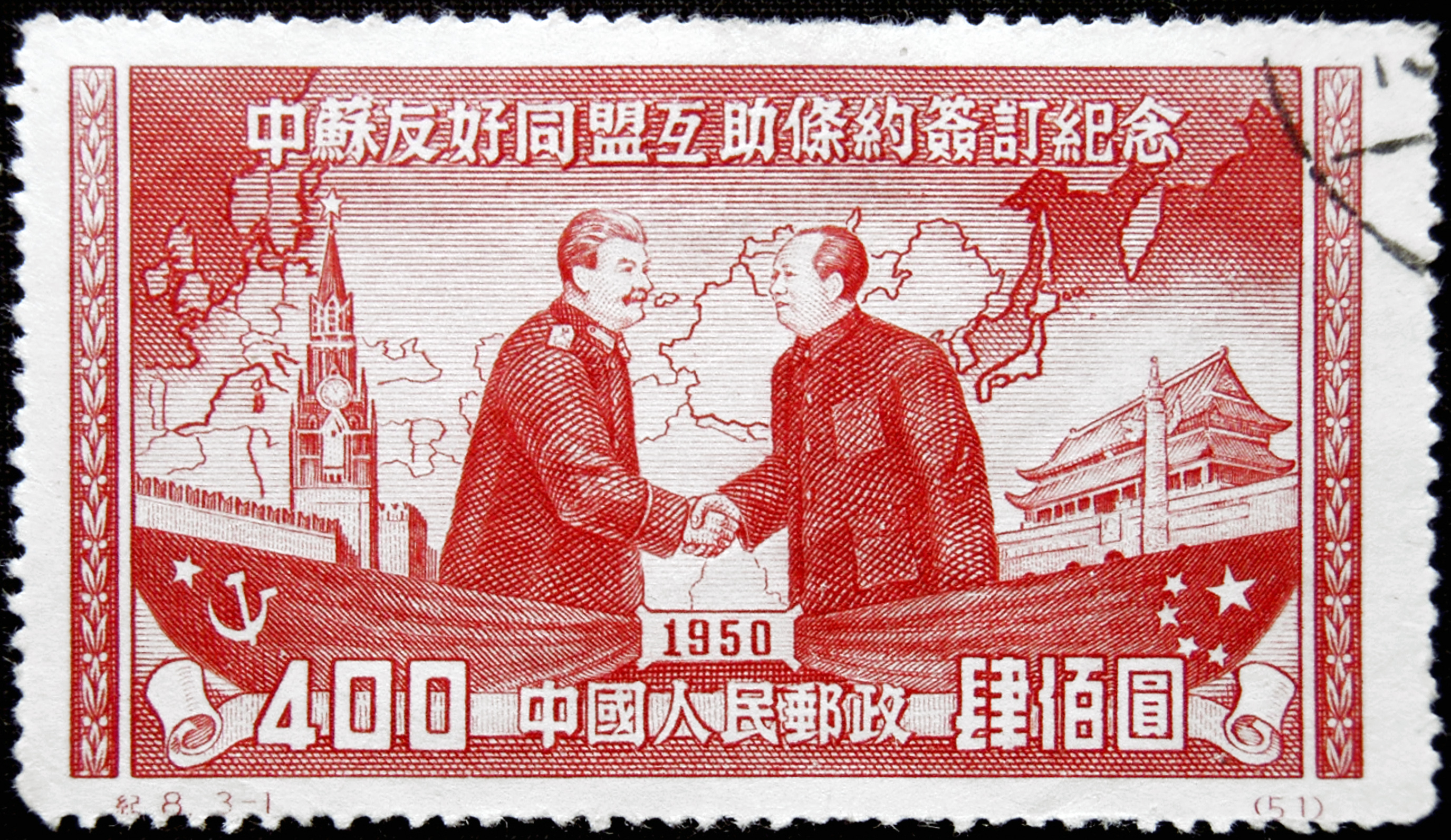
On October 2, 1949, the Soviet Union was the first country to officially recognize the People's Republic of China after its establishment.

Following the Chinese Civil War and victory of Mao Zedong's Communist forces over the Kuomintang forces of Generalissimo Chiang Kai-shek, who fled to Taiwan, Mao Zedong proclaimed the founding of the People's Republic of China (PRC) on 1 October 1949. Mao laid heavy theoretical emphasis on planned economy and class struggle, following Stalinism from the Soviet Union.

Between 1949 and 1953, Mao and the Chinese Communist Party (CCP) launched campaigns to persecute former landlords and merchants, known as the Land Reform Movement, starting the industrialisation program at the same time. Mao's goal was a total overhaul of the land ownership system, and extensive land reforms, including the execution of more powerful landlords. China's old system of gentry landlord ownership of farmland and tenant peasants was replaced with a distribution system in favor of poor/landless peasants which significantly reduced economic inequality, meanwhile over a million landlords were executed in the Chinese land reform. The campaign resulted in hundreds of millions of peasants receiving a plot of land for the first time, and "middling peasants", who now accounted for 90% of the village population, owned 91% of the land. However, between 1953 and 1956, further campaigns were launched by the CCP as "socialist transformation of ownership of the means of production"; the Communist Party began a collectivization campaign in villages across the country and peasants were forced to join agricultural production cooperatives and, as collective farming spread, peasants gave their land-use rights to these cooperatives.

On the other hand, the PRC officially passed and enacted its first Constitution in 1954, meanwhile continual political movements and class struggles were launched nationwide under Mao. Major political movements in the early 1950s included the Suppression of Counter-revolutionaries, the Three-anti and Five-anti Campaigns and the Sufan Movement, each of which resulted in a large number of deaths nationwide. Kuomintang officials and soldiers who remained in mainland China were purged during the Counterrevolutionaries Suppression Campaign (鎮壓反革命運動; 1950–1953), where reported over 1 million were executed. It was followed by the Three-Anti & Five-Anti Campaigns (三反五反運動;1951-1952), during which corrupt CCP officials and other "enemies of the people", mostly in cities, were purged or even summarily executed. The subsequent Hundred Flowers Campaign and Anti-Rightist Campaign of 1957–1958 significantly damaged the democracy in China, during which at least 550,000 people were persecuted, most of whom were intellectuals and political dissidents. After the Anti-Rightist Campaign, China entered the de facto one-party state of the Chinese Communist Party.

=== Great Leap Forward and aftermath ===
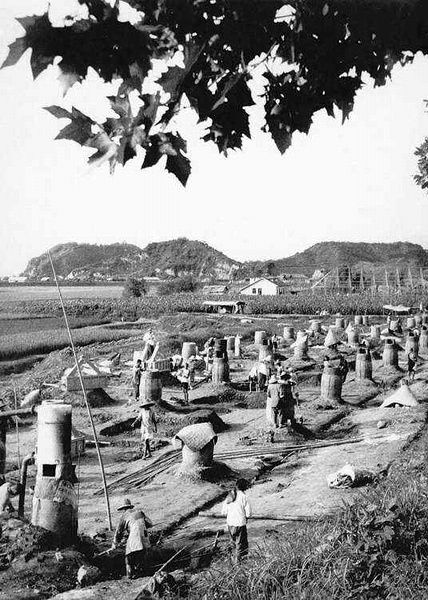
Backyard furnaces were commonly used to produce steel during the Great Leap Forward.

Mao Zedong believed that socialism would eventually triumph over all other ideologies, and following the First Five-Year Plan (1953–1957) based on a Soviet-style centrally controlled economy, Mao took on the ambitious project of the "Great Leap Forward" in 1958, beginning an unprecedented process of collectivisation in rural areas, known as the "People's commune". Mao urged the use of communally organised iron smelters to increase steel production, pulling workers off of agricultural labor to the point that large amounts of crops rotted unharvested. Meanwhile, a nationwide large-scale campaign to eliminate sparrows (part of the Four Pests campaign) was launched in 1958 because Mao had heard complaints from farmers that sparrows were eating their grains, but the sparrow elimination campaign resulted in a major ecological disaster.

The implementation of Maoism thought in China may have been responsible for the deadliest famine in human history, in which 15–55 million people died due to starvation and epidemics. By the end of 1961, the birth rate was nearly cut in half because of malnutrition. In 1958, the Xunhua uprising broke out and in 1959, a major uprising erupted in Tibet, resulting in the deaths of tens of thousands of Tibetans, and the Dalai Lama went into exile afterwards. Meeting criticisms from Marshal Peng Dehuai and others at the Lushan conference over the radical policies, Mao launched the massive "Anti-Right Deviation Struggle" in 1959, during which over 3 million CCP members were labelled as "right-deviationists" or "right-opportunists" and were subsequently purged or penalized. During the Great Famine, a special supply system (or tegong) was established nationwide in 1960, providing food and daily necessities exclusively to high-ranking officials of the CCP and Chinese government.

Mao's failure with the Leap reduced his power in government, whose administrative duties fell to President Liu Shaoqi and Deng Xiaoping, especially after the Seven Thousand Cadres Conference in early 1962. Liu, Deng and other leaders allowed limited economic and market reform such as sanzi yibao, which were viewed by Mao as means to destroy the socialism. The power struggle between Mao Zedong and Liu Shaoqi together with Deng Xiaoping began since 1962. The Socialist Education Movement was launched by Mao from 1963 to 1965, as a result.

Much more successful was the "Two Bombs, One Satellite" program, launched in 1958, with the help at first of Moscow. It used leading scientists who returned to mainland China from abroad, including Qian Xuesen, Deng Jiaxian and Qian Sanqiang. China's first atomic bomb, nuclear missile, hydrogen bomb and artificial satellite were all successfully developed by 1970. However, the program had been seriously affected by the Great Leap Forward and the Cultural Revolution.

=== Third Front ===
After the failure of the Great Leap Forward, China's leadership slowed the pace of industrialization. It invested more on in China's coastal regions and focused on the production of consumer goods. After an April 1964 General Staff report concluded that the concentration of China's industry in its major coastal cities made it vulnerable to attack by foreign powers, Mao argued for the development of basic industry and national defense industry in protected locations in China's interior. This resulted in the building of the Third Front, which involved massive projects including railroad infrastructure, aerospace industry including satellite launch facilities, and steel production industry including Panzhihua Iron and Steel.

Development of the Third Front slowed in 1966 during the Cultural Revolution, but accelerated again after the Sino-Soviet border conflict at Zhenbao Island, which increased the perceived risk of Soviet Invasion. Third Front construction again decreased after United States President Richard Nixon's 1972 visit to China and the resulting rapprochement between the United States and China. When Reform and Opening up began after Mao's death, China began to gradually wind down Third Front projects. The Third Front distributed physical and human capital around the country, ultimately decreased regional disparities and created favorable conditions for later market development.

=== Cultural Revolution ===
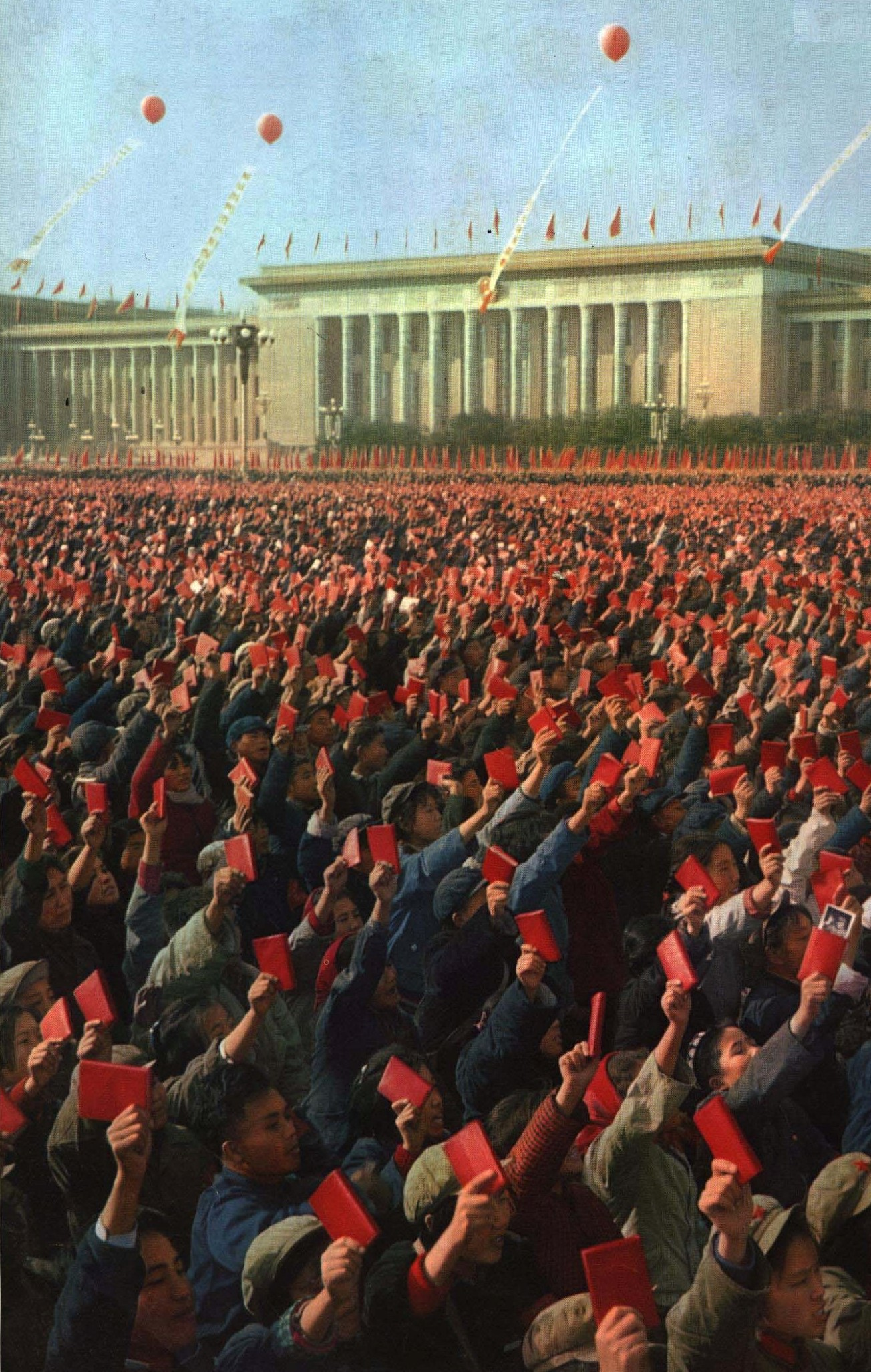
Red Guards on Tiananmen Square during the Cultural Revolution (1967)

In 1963, Mao Zedong launched the Socialist Education Movement, which is regarded as the precursor of the Cultural Revolution. To impose socialist orthodoxy and rid China of "Four Olds", and at the same time serving certain political goals, Mao began the Cultural Revolution in May 1966, attempting to return to the center of political power in China. The campaign was far reaching into all aspects of Chinese life. Estimated death toll ranges from millions to 20,000,000. Massacres took place across the country while massive cannibalism also occurred. Starting from the "Red August" of 1966 in Beijing, Red Guards terrorized the streets as many ordinary citizens were deemed counter-revolutionaries; education and public transportation came to a nearly complete halt.

In 1967, rebel groups began seizing power from local governments and party branches, establishing new revolutionary committees in their place meanwhile smashing the police, procuratorate and judicial systems. These committees often split into rival factions, engaging in the deadly violent struggles. Large-scale political purges such as Cleansing the Class Ranks and One Strike-Three Anti Campaign swept across the country; many prominent political leaders, including Liu Shaoqi and Deng Xiaoping, were purged and deemed "capitalist roaders". Millions of people were labelled as members of the Five Black Categories and were persecuted, while many intellectuals and scientists were labelled as the Stinking Old Ninth and went through struggle sessions. In 1971, the Lin Biao Incident shocked Beijing, followed by the rise of Gang of Four. The Revolution would not come to a complete end until the death of Mao Zedong and arrest of the Gang of Four in 1976. The second constitution of China, known as the "1975 Constitution", was passed in 1975 during the Cultural Revolution.

On the other hand, by the time of Mao's death, China's unity and sovereignty were assured for the first time in a century, and there was development of infrastructure, industry, healthcare, education (only 20% of the population could read in 1949, compared to 65.5% thirty years later), which raised standard of living for the average Chinese. There is also an argument that campaigns such as the Great Leap Forward – an example of the concept New Democracy – and the Cultural Revolution were essential in jumpstarting China's development and "purifying" its culture: even though the consequences of both these campaigns were economically and humanly disastrous, they left behind a "clean slate" on which later economic progress could be built.

=== Foreign relations ===
Before the Sino-Soviet split in the 1960s, the primary foreign policy of the People's Republic of China was to obtain diplomatic recognition in the face of strong American opposition. In 1950, Mao Zedong sent People's Volunteer Army to help North Korea in the Korean War until 1953. The Bandung Conference in 1955, at which Premier Zhou Enlai led the Chinese delegation, was an important milestone for China's foreign relations. China developed its foreign relations with many newly independent and soon-to-be independent countries. China's Five Principles of Peaceful Coexistence were incorporated into the Ten Principles of Bandung.In 1964, tensions between Washington and Paris allowed France to open relations.

There were also sporadic military confrontations between the People's Republic of China and the Republic of China based in Taiwan. Around the Dongshan Island in Fujian Province, for example, there were Battle of Dongshan Island in 1950 and the Dongshan Island Campaign in 1953 between the People's Liberation Army and the Republic of China Armed Forces, followed by another Battle of Dongshan in August 1965.

==== Soviet Union ====
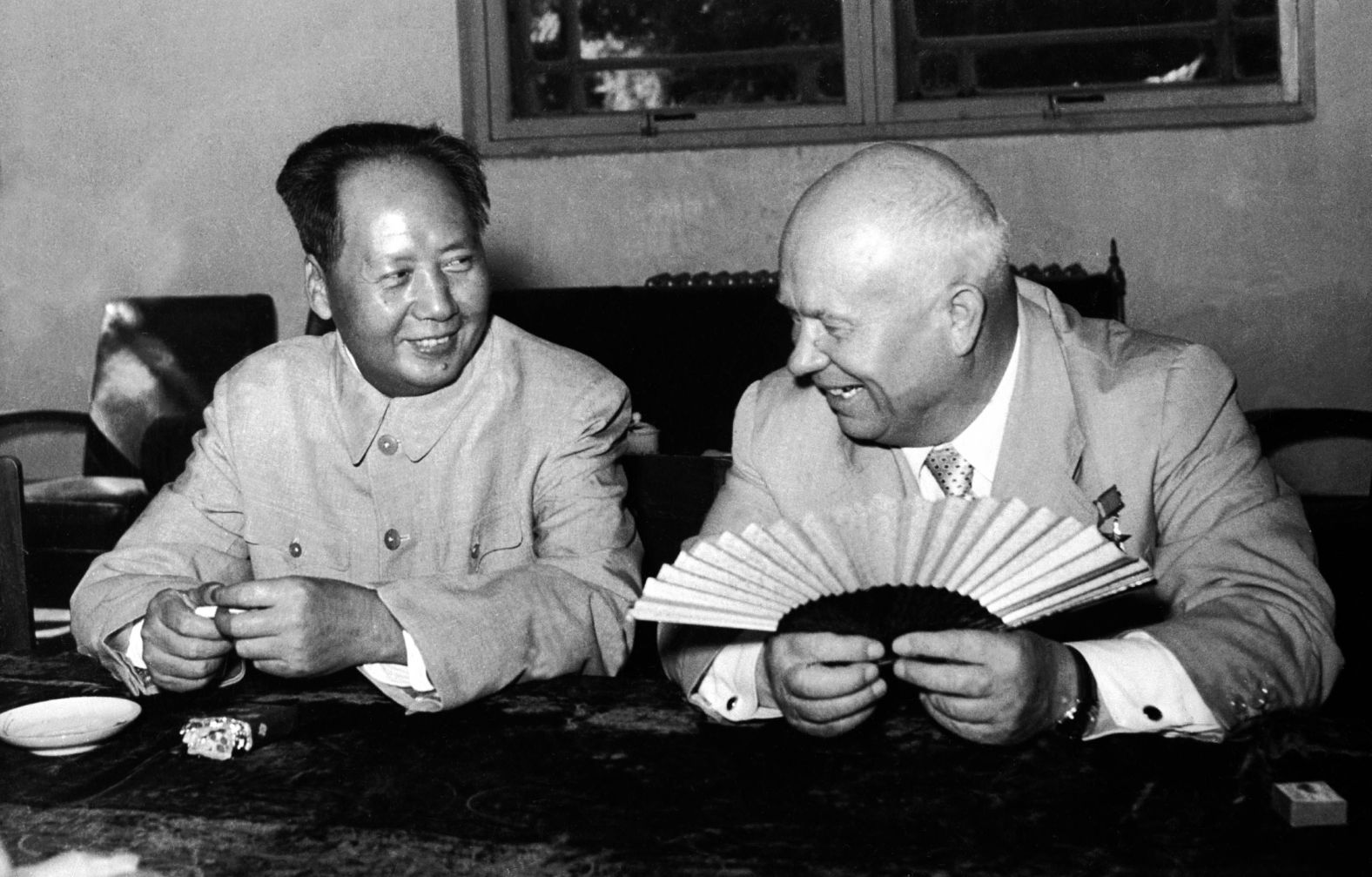
Soviet leader Nikita Khrushchev visited PRC and met with Mao Zedong in 1958.

Beijing was very pleased that the success of the Soviet Union in the space race – the original Sputniks – demonstrated that the international communist movement had caught up in high technology with the Americans. Mao assumed that the Soviets now had a military advantage and should step up the Cold War; Khrushchev knew that the Americans were well ahead in military uses of space. The strains multiplied, quickly making a dead letter of the 1950 alliance, destroying the socialist camp unity, and affected the world balance of power. The split started with Nikita Khrushchev De-Stalinization program. It angered Mao, who admired Stalin. In addition, the radical policies of the Great Leap Forward as well as Mao's controversial remarks on nuclear wars troubled Moscow. According to Chinese records, the Soviet Union suddenly withdrew 1390 technicians and ended 600 contracts with China in 1960.

Moscow and Beijing became worldwide rivals, forcing communist parties around the world to take sides; many of them split, so that the pro-Soviet communists were battling the pro-Chinese communists for local control of the left-wing forces in much of the world. At the 1960 International Meeting of Communist and Workers Parties, and later at the 22nd Congress of the Communist Party of the Soviet Union in 1961, the Sino-Soviet conflict became out of control and was increasingly fought out in 81 communist parties around the world. Khrushchev personally attacked Mao as an ultra leftist – a left revisionist – and compared him to Stalin for dangerous egotism. China later ridiculed the Russian incompetence in the Cuban Missile Crisis of 1962 as adventurism to start with and capitulationism to wind up on the losing side. Moscow now was increasingly giving priority to friendly relationships and test ban treaties with the United States and United Kingdom. A crisis came in 1962, when over 60,000 refugees escaped from Xinjiang in western China to Soviet territory to escape persecution, historically known as the "Yi–Ta incident". Meanwhile, border conflicts such as the Tielieketi incident quickly escalated between the two countries. The Sino-Soviet conflict culminated after the Zhenbao Island Incident in 1969, when the Soviet Union led by Leonid Brezhnev planned to launch a large-scale nuclear strike on China, including major cities like Beijing, Changchun and Anshan, as well as China's nuclear sites including Jiuquan, Xichang and Lop Nur. On October 14, 1969, the Central Committee of the Chinese Communist Party released an urgent evacuation order to the Party and state leaders in Beijing, requiring all leaders to leave Beijing by October 20, with Mao travelling to Wuhan and Lin Biao travelling to Suzhou. Lin also issued the "Order Number One" on October 18, putting all PLA personnel on alert for imminent attack from the Soviet Union. Eventually, the Soviet called off the attack due to the intervention from the United States. Increasingly, Beijing began to consider the Soviet Union, which it viewed as Social imperialism, as the greatest threat it faced, more so than even the leading capitalist power, the United States. In turn, overtures were made between the PRC and the United States, such as in the Ping Pong Diplomacy, Panda Diplomacy and the 1972 Nixon visit to China.

==== Major diplomatic relations established ====
In 1950, India became one of the first countries to recognize People's Republic of China and establish formal diplomatic relation. However, India had close ties to the USSR and in 1962, a one-month Sino-Indian war and also a one-month Second Sino-Indian war in 1967 broke out along their remote border. Border tensions flared from time to time ever since.

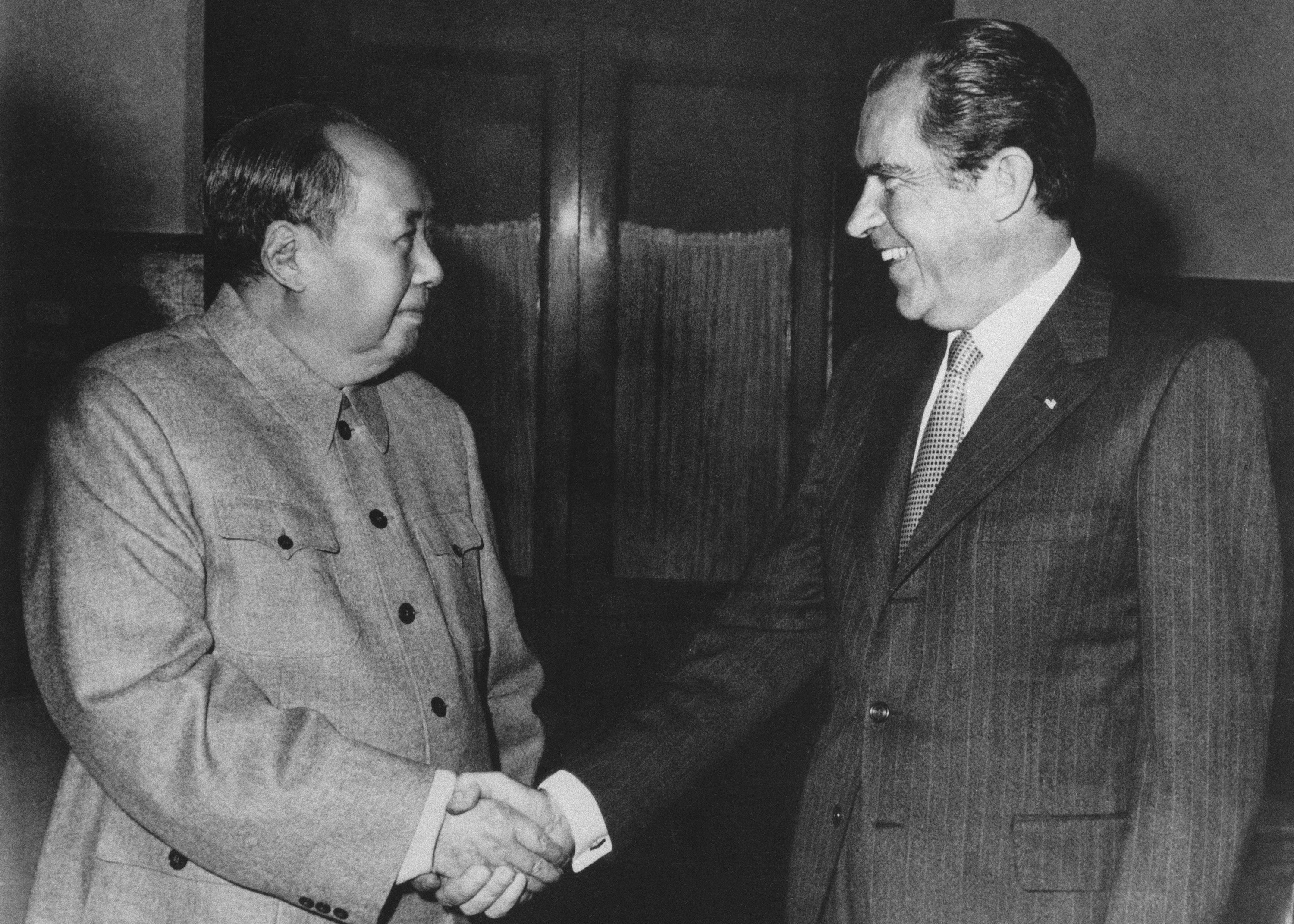
U.S. President Richard Nixon made a historic visit to China in 1972 and met with Mao Zedong.

China established formal relationships with several major western countries and Japan, primarily after the Sino-Soviet split in the 1960s. Typically, the other party broke formal relations it had with the government of Republic of China (ROC) in Taiwan once it established diplomatic relations with the People's Republic of China (PRC).

- In January 1964, PRC established formal diplomatic relations with France.
- In October 1970, PRC established formal diplomatic relations with Canada.
- In November 1970, PRC established formal diplomatic relations with Italy.
- In 1971, Albania's motion in the United Nations to recognize the People's Republic of China as the sole legal China (replacing the Republic of China) was passed as General Assembly Resolution 2758.
- In March 1972, China established formal diplomatic relations with the United Kingdom. The UK was the first major Western country to recognize the PRC in 1950.
- In September 1972, PRC established formal diplomatic relations with Japan.
- In October 1972, PRC established formal diplomatic relations with West Germany.
- In December 1972, PRC established formal diplomatic relations with Australia.
- In March 1973, PRC established formal diplomatic relations with Spain.

=== Disasters ===
Only major disasters are presented below (click to show).

| Time | Disaster | Location | Deaths | Descriptions |
|---|---|---|---|---|
| 1950 | Assam–Tibet earthquake | Tibet | 4,000 | Around 4000 people died in Tibet, while over 1000 died in India. |
| 1954 | Yangtze floods | Yangtze River | 33,000 | Mostly in Hubei province. |
| 1957–1958 | Asian flu | Worldwide | | The pandemic started in Guizhou in southern China, and killed 1–4 million worldwide. |
| 1959–1961 | Great Chinese Famine | Nationwide | 15–55 million | Mainly caused by the Great Leap Forward. |
| 1966 | Xingtai earthquake | Hebei | 8,064 | Magnitude 6.8 M_{w}. |
| 1968–1969 | Hong Kong flu | Worldwide | | The pandemic started in British Hong Kong, and killed 1–4 million worldwide. |
| 1970 | Tonghai earthquake | Yunnan | Over 10,000 | Magnitude 7.1 M_{w}. The earthquake occurred during the height of the Cultural Revolution, and it was not widely publicized by the Chinese government for over a decade. |
| 1975 | Haicheng earthquake | Liaoning | 1,328 | Magnitude 7.5 M_{s}. Some claimed the death toll was 2,041. |
| 1975 | The Banqiao Dam failure | Henan | 85,600–240,000 | 62 dams including the largest Banqiao Dam in Henan province collapsed due to Typhoon Nina of 1975, creating the third-largest flood in history (according to the Chinese government, the death toll was 26,000). It was rated No.1 in "The Ultimate 10 Technological Disasters" of the world by Discovery Channel in May 2005 (the Ultimate 10 show), beating the Chernobyl nuclear disaster. Most of the dams that collapsed in this disaster were built with the help of experts from Soviet Union or during the Great Leap Forward. |
| 1976 | Tangshan earthquake | Hebei | At least 242,769 | Magnitude 7.6 M_{w}. |

=== Controversies ===
During the Mao era, tens of millions of people died during various political movements as well as during the Great Chinese Famine, while tens of millions of other people were persecuted and permanently crippled. China turned into a de facto one-party state after the Anti-Rightist Campaign starting in 1957, during which democracy and the rule of law were damaged while at least 550,000 intellectuals and political dissidents were persecuted. Moreover, the Cultural Revolution severely damaged the rule of law as well as traditional Chinese culture and moral values; massacres were committed across the country and acts of cannibalism were also committed on a massive scale (e.g., Guangxi Massacre). Higher education was halted during the Cultural Revolution and scientific research was also seriously affected because many scientists were persecuted, killed or committed suicide. Some doubt statistics or accounts given for death tolls or other damages incurred by Mao's campaigns, attributing the high death toll to natural disasters, famine, or other consequences of political chaos during the rule of Chiang Kai-shek.

Mao Zedong and the Chinese Communist Party (CCP) also exported the ideology of socialism and socialist revolution to other parts of the world, especially to Southeast Asia. Influenced and supported by Mao and the CCP, Pol Pot and the Khmer Rouge conducted the Cambodian genocide during which 1.5-2 million people were killed in just three years.

== Transition and the Deng era (1976–1989) ==
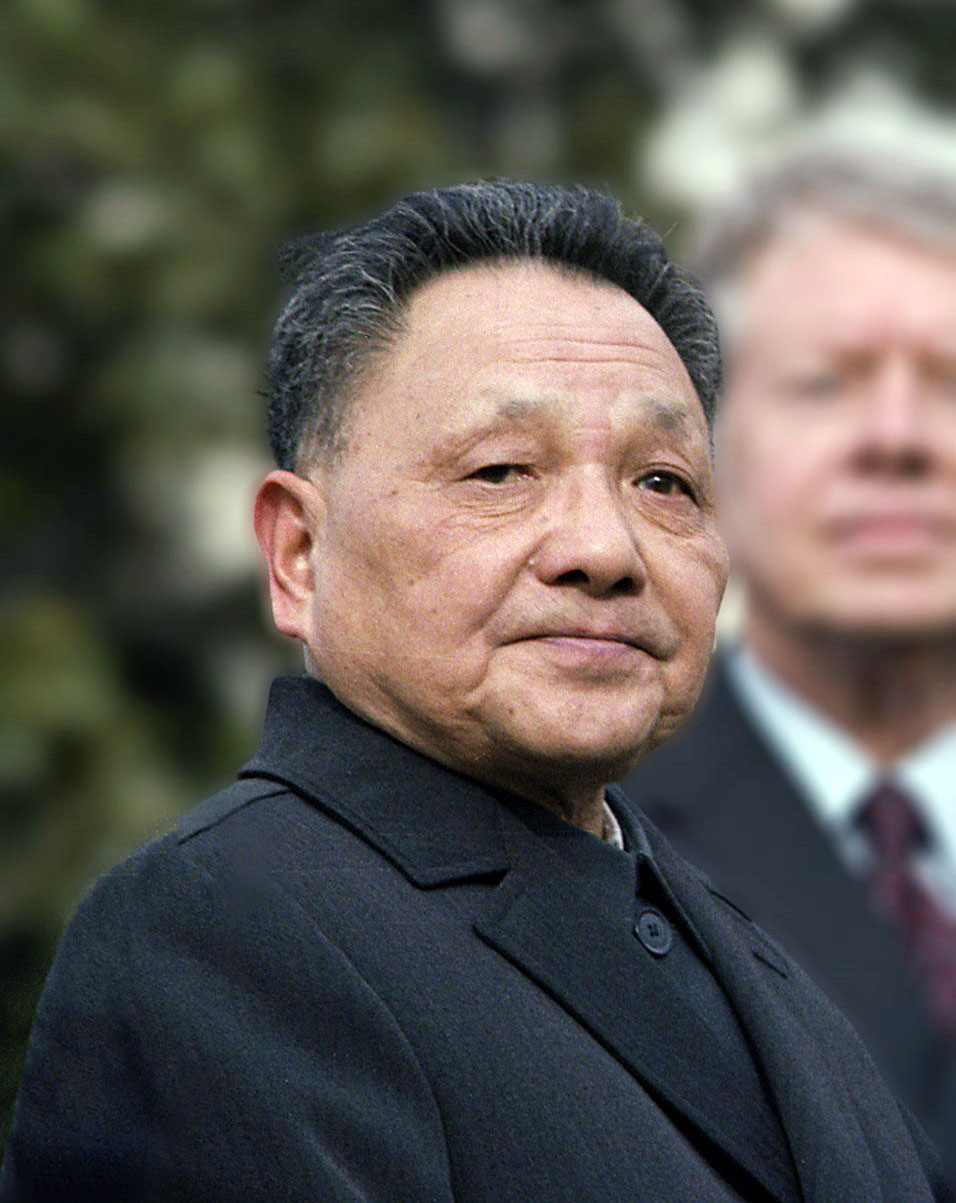
Deng Xiaoping and Jimmy Carter at the arrival ceremony for the Vice Premier of China

=== The transition period ===
Mao Zedong's death was followed by a power struggle between the Gang of Four, Hua Guofeng, and eventually Deng Xiaoping. The third constitution of China, known as the "1978 Constitution", was passed in 1978 under Hua's "Two Whatevers".

In December 1978, with the support of Ye Jianying and other high-ranking officials, Deng eventually replaced Hua and became the paramount leader of China during the 3rd plenary session of the 11th Central Committee of CCP. Deng's allies such as Hu Yaobang and Zhao Ziyang also received promotions.

=== Invalidating the Cultural Revolution ===
In September 1977, Deng first proposed the idea of Boluan Fanzheng, attempting to dismantle the far-left Maoist policies associated with the Cultural Revolution. In the same year, he resumed the National College Entrance Examination which was cancelled for ten years due to the Cultural Revolution. Meanwhile, the "1978 Truth Criterion Discussion" triggered a decade-long New Enlightenment movement in mainland China, promoting democracy, humanism and universal values such as freedom, human rights and rule of law, while opposing the ideology of Cultural Revolution.

Within several years starting 1978, victims of more than 3 million "unjust, false, wrongful cases" were rehabilitated by Deng and his allies such as Hu Yaobang, then General Secretary of the Chinese Communist Party. However, on the subject of Mao's legacy, Deng coined the famous phrase "7 parts good, 3 parts bad" and avoided denouncing Mao altogether. A major document presented at the September 1979 Fourth Plenum, gave a "preliminary assessment" of the entire 30-year period of Communist rule. At the plenum, party Vice Chairman Ye Jianying declared the Cultural Revolution "an appalling catastrophe" and "the most severe setback to [the] socialist cause since [1949]".

In June 1981, the Chinese government's condemnation of the Cultural Revolution culminated in the Resolution on Certain Questions in the History of Our Party Since the Founding of the People's Republic of China, adopted by the sixth plenary session of the Eleventh Central Committee of the Chinese Communist Party. This resolution invalidated the Cultural Revolution as a "domestic havoc", but it stated that "Comrade Mao Zedong was a great Marxist and a great proletarian revolutionary, strategist and theorist. It is true that he made gross mistakes during the "Cultural Revolution", but, if we judge his activities as a whole, his contributions to the Chinese revolution far outweigh his mistakes. His merits are primary and his errors secondary".

As an aftermath of the Cultural Revolution, nationwide public safety worsened in the late 1970s and early 1980s, and as a result Deng launched the "Strike Hard" Anti-crime Campaign in 1983 which lasted until early 1987. More than 1.7 million people were arrested and received legal punishment during the campaign.

=== Reform and opening up ===
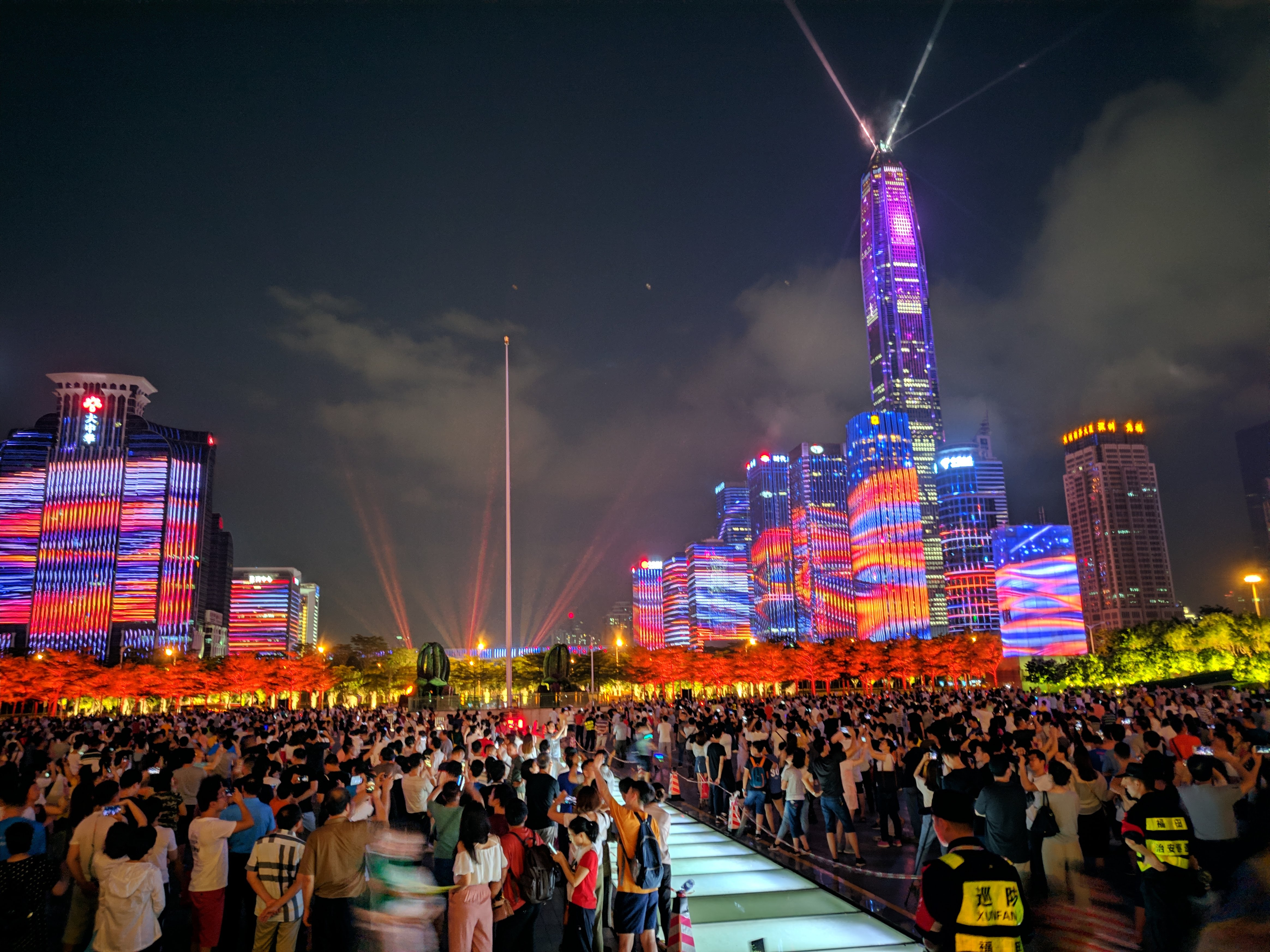
Shenzhen, one of the first special economic zones of China and the "Silicon Valley of China". Notable high-tech companies such as Huawei, ZTE and Konka were all founded in Shenzhen in the 1980s.

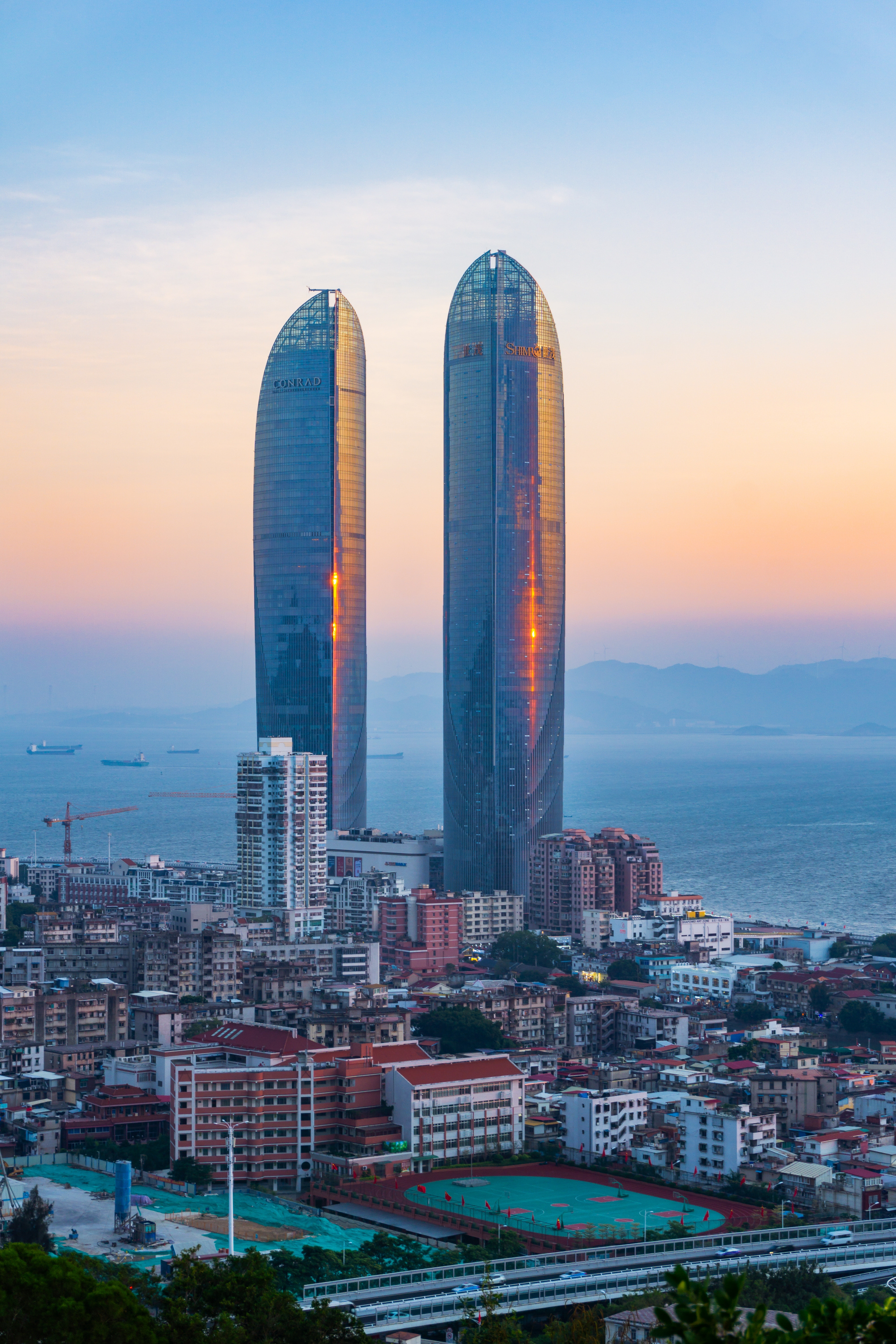
Xiamen, one of the first special economic zones of China

At the Third Plenum of the Eleventh National Party Congress Central Committee, Deng embarked China on the road to reform and opening up, policies that began with the de-collectivisation of the countryside, followed with industrial reforms aimed at decentralizing government controls in the industrial sector. In 1979, Deng emphasized the goal of "Four Modernizations" and further proposed the idea of "xiaokang", or "moderately prosperous society". Deng laid emphasis on light industry as a stepping stone to the development of heavy industries. The achievements of Lee Kuan Yew to create an economic superpower in Singapore had a profound effect on the Communist leadership in China. Leaders in China made a major effort, especially under Deng Xiaoping, to emulate his policies of economic growth, entrepreneurship, and subtle suppression of dissent. Over the years, more than 22,000 Chinese officials were sent to Singapore to study its methods.

In rural areas of China, people's communes from Mao era were abolished and were replaced by the household responsibility system, returning the land-use rights to farmers; this agricultural reform resulted in significant growth in productivity. At the same time, Deng championed the idea of Special Economic Zones (SEZ) in urban areas, including Shenzhen, Zhuhai and Xiamen, areas where foreign investment would be allowed to pour in without strict government restraint and regulations, running on a basically capitalist system. On 31 January 1979, the Shekou Industrial Zone of Shenzhen was founded, becoming the first experimental area in China to "open up". Under the leadership of Yuan Geng, the "Shekou model" of development was gradually formed, embodied in its famous slogan "Time is Money, Efficiency is Life", which then widely spread to other parts of China. In January 1984, Deng Xiaoping made his first inspection tour to Shenzhen and Zhuhai, recognizing the "Shenzhen Speed" of development as well as the success of the special economics zones. With the help of Yuan Geng, the first joint-stock commercial bank in China – the China Merchants Bank – and the first joint-stock insurance company in China – the Ping An Insurance – were both established in Shekou. In May 1984, fourteen coastal cities in China including Shanghai, Guangzhou and Tianjin were named "Open Coastal Cities" (沿海开放城市).

Deng recognized the importance of science and technology in the "Four Modernizations", pointing out that "science and technology are the primary productive force". In December 1981, he approved the construction of "Beijing Electron–Positron Collider", the first high-energy particle collider in China, and had several meetings with Nobel laureate Tsung-Dao Lee who supported the project. In 1985, the Great Wall Station, the first Chinese research station in Antarctica, was established. In 1986, Deng approved the proposal from four leading Chinese scientists and launched the "863 Program"; in the same year, the nine-year compulsory education system was established under law (Law on Nine-Year Compulsory Education). In the 1980s, Qinshan Nuclear Power Plant in Zhejiang and Daya Bay Nuclear Power Plant in Shenzhen were built, becoming the first two nuclear power plants in China. Deng also approved the appointments of foreign nationals to work in China, including the renowned Chinese-American mathematician Shiing-Shen Chern.

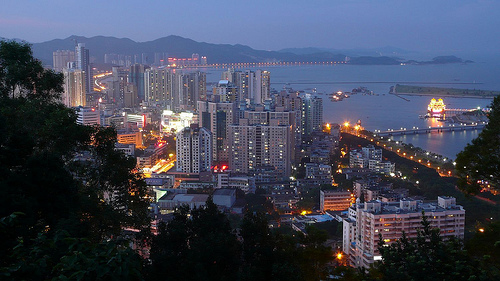
Zhuhai, one of the first special economic zones of China

Supporters of the economic reforms point to the rapid development of the consumer and export sectors of the economy, the creation of an urban middle class that now constitutes 15% of the population, higher living standards (which is shown via dramatic increases in GDP per capita, consumer spending, life expectancy, literacy rate, and total grain output) and a much wider range of personal rights and freedoms for average Chinese as evidence of the success of the reforms. Critics of the economic reforms, both in China and abroad, claim that the reforms have caused wealth disparity, environmental pollution, rampant corruption, widespread unemployment and layoffs at inefficient state-owned enterprises under the state policy of Xiagang (下岗), and has introduced often unwelcome cultural influences; consequently, some believe that China's culture has been corrupted, the poor have been reduced to a hopeless abject underclass, and that the social stability is threatened.

After all, the path of modernisation and market-oriented economic reforms that China started since the early 1980s appears to be fundamentally unchallenged. Even critics of China's market reforms do not wish to see a backtrack of these two decades of reforms, but rather propose corrective measures to offset some of the social issues caused by existing reforms. On the other hand, in 1979, the Chinese government instituted a one child policy to try to control its rapidly increasing population. The controversial policy resulted in a dramatic decrease in child poverty. The law was eliminated in 2015.

=== Political reforms ===
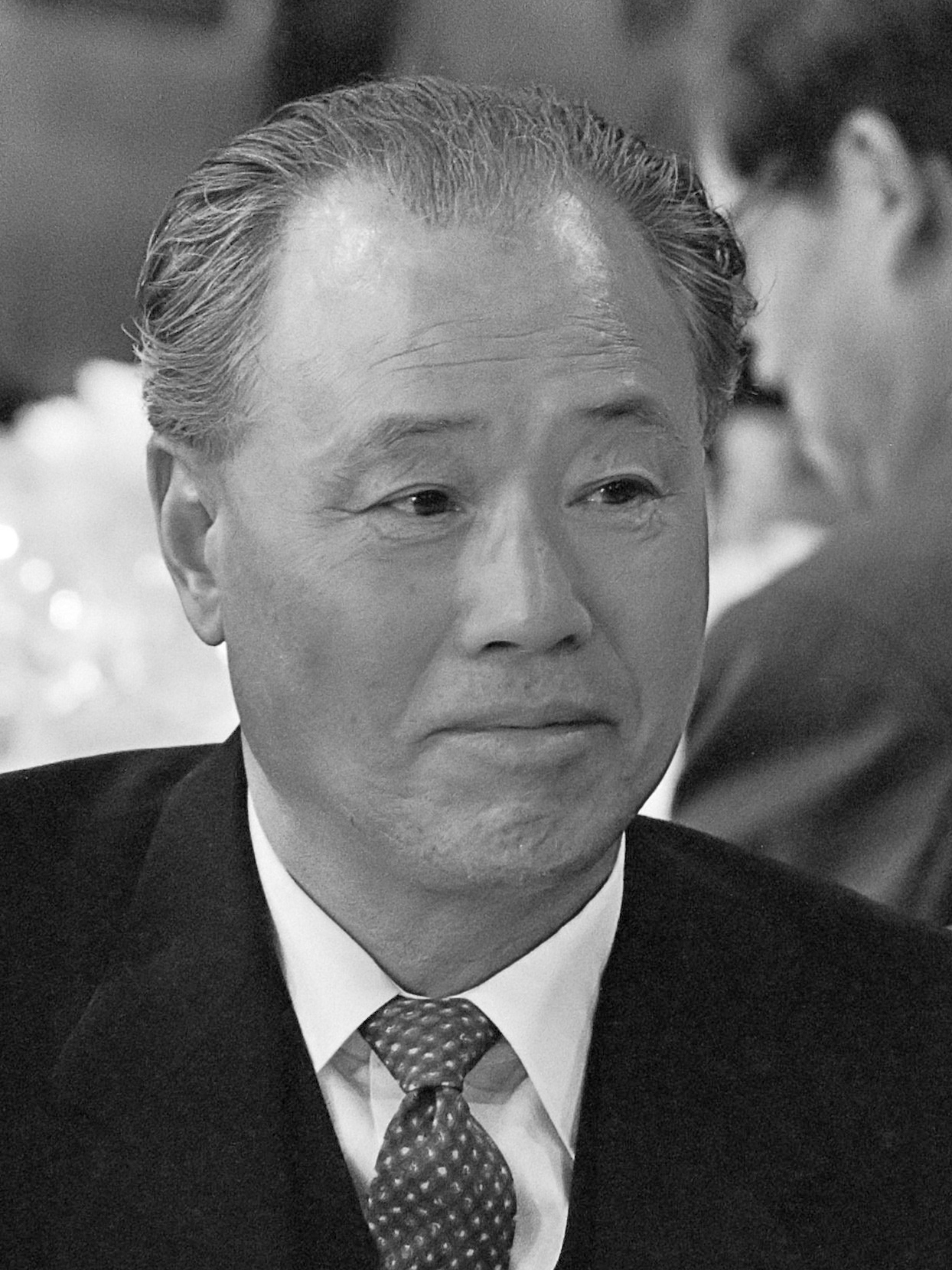
Zhao Ziyang, a leading reformist, was assigned by Deng to take charge of the political reforms since 1986. However, he was forced to leave his position as the General Secretary of CCP after the 1989 Tiananmen Square protests and massacre, while the majority of the planned political reforms (after 1986) ended drastically.

On 18 August 1980, Deng Xiaoping gave a speech titled "On the Reform of the System of Party and State Leadership" at an enlarged meeting of the Political Bureau of the CCP Central Committee in Beijing, launching the political reforms in China. He called for the end of bureaucracy, centralisation of power as well as patriarchy, proposing term limits to the leading positions in China and advocating the "democratic centralism" as well as the "collective leadership". In addition, Deng proposed to the National People's Congress a systematic revision of China's constitution (the 1978 Constitution), and emphasized that the Constitution must be able to protect the civil rights of Chinese citizens and must reflect the principle of separation of powers; he also described the idea of "collective leadership" and championed the principle of "one man, one vote" among leaders to avoid the dictatorship of the General Secretary of CCP. In December 1982, the fourth Constitution of the People's Republic, known as the "1982 Constitution", was passed by the 5th National People's Congress, embodying Chinese-style constitutionalism with most of its content still being effective as of today.

In the first half of 1986, Deng repeatedly called for the revival of political reforms, as further economic reforms were hindered by the original political system while the country had seen an increasing trend of corruption and economic inequality, aggravated by the many social privileges enjoyed by governmental officials and their relatives. A five-man research unit for China's political reforms was established in September 1986, and the members included Zhao Ziyang, Hu Qili, Tian Jiyun, Bo Yibo and Peng Chong. Deng's intention of political reforms was to boost the administrative efficiency, further separate the responsibilities between the Communist Party and the Government, and to eliminate bureaucracy. Although he also mentioned "rule of law" and "democracy", Deng delimited the reforms within the one-party system and opposed the implementation of Western-style constitutionalism. In October 1987, at the 13th National Congress of CCP chaired by Deng, Zhao Ziyang delivered an important talk drafted by Bao Tong on the political reforms. In his speech titled "Advance Along the Road of Socialism with Chinese characteristics" (沿着有中国特色的社会主义道路前进), Zhao argued that the socialism in China was still in its primary stage and by taking Deng's speech in 1980 as guidelines, Zhao outlined a variety of steps to be taken for the political reforms, including promoting the rule of law and the separation of powers, imposing de-centralisation, and improving the election system. At this Congress, Zhao was elected as the new General Secretary of CCP.

However, after the 1989 Tiananmen Square protests and massacre, many leading reformists including Zhao and Bao were removed from their posts, and the majority of the planned political reforms (after 1986) ended drastically. Left-wing conservatives led by Chen Yun, President Li Xiannian and Premier Li Peng took control until Deng Xiaoping's southern tour in early 1992. On the other hand, many policies due to the political reforms launched by Deng in the early 1980s remain effective after 1989 (such as the new Constitution, term limits, and the democratic centralism), even though some of them have been reversed by CCP general secretary Xi Jinping after 2012.

=== Political turmoil ===
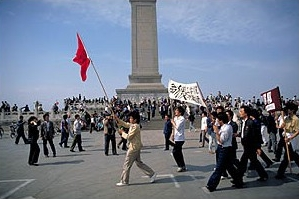
The 1989 Tiananmen Square protests, which was ended by a military-led massacre

In 1983, left-wing conservatives initiated the "Anti-Spiritual Pollution Campaign".

In 1986, the student demonstrations led to the resignation of Hu Yaobang, then General Secretary of CCP and a leading reformist, and the left-wing conservatives continued to launch the "Anti-Bourgeois Liberalisation Campaign". The campaign ended in mid-1987 because Zhao Ziyang convinced Deng Xiaoping that the conservatives were taking advantage of the campaign to oppose the Reforms and Opening-up program.

Although standards of living improved significantly in the 1980s, Deng's reforms were not without criticism. Hard-liners asserted that Deng opened China once again to various social evils, and an overall increase in materialistic thinking, while liberals attacked Deng's unrelenting stance on wider political reforms. Liberal forces began gathering in different forms to protest against the Party's authoritarian leadership. In 1989, the death of Hu Yaobang, a liberal figure, triggered weeks of spontaneous protests in the Tiananmen Square. The government imposed martial law and sent in tanks and soldiers to suppress the demonstrations. Western countries and multilateral organisations briefly suspended their formal ties with China's government under Premier Li Peng's leadership, which was directly responsible for the military curfew and bloody crackdown.

=== Military modernisation ===
In early 1979, China started a one-month war with Vietnam. Furthermore, China continued to support Khmer Rouge during Deng Xiaoping's time together with the United States, Thailand and several other countries to counter the regional influence of the Soviet Union.

In March 1981, Deng Xiaoping determined that a military exercise was necessary for the People's Liberation Army (PLA), and in September 1981, the North China Military Exercise took place, becoming the largest exercise conducted by the PLA since the founding of the People's Republic.

In 1985, in order to modernise the PLA and to save money, Deng cut 1 million troops from the military and ordered further modernisation.

=== Foreign relations ===
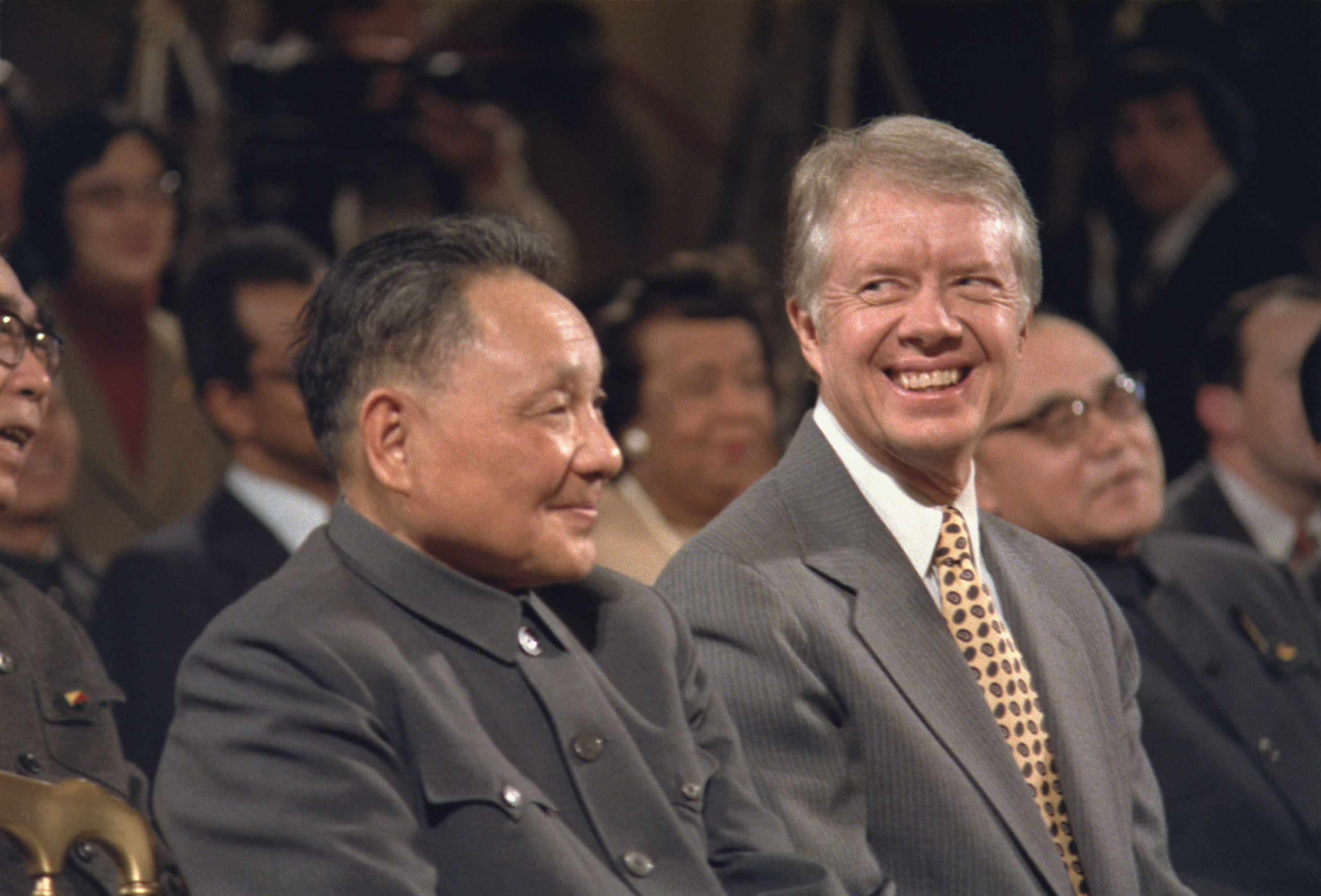
Deng Xiaoping and Jimmy Carter in 1979

On 1 January 1979, the People's Republic of China formally established its diplomatic relations with the United States. In January 1979, Deng Xiaoping visited the United States, which was first official visit by a paramount leader of China to the United States. In the same year, the Chinese Olympic Committee for PRC was recognized by the International Olympic Committee. Under the advice of Lee Kuan Yew, Deng Xiaoping agreed to further open up the country and stop exporting communist ideologies and revolutions to other countries like Mao did, and the decisions significantly improved the relations between China and many countries, especially those in south-east Asia.

In 1984, Xu Haifeng, a pistol shooter, won the first Olympic gold medal for China during the 1984 Summer Olympics in Los Angeles. In the same year, the Sino-British Joint Declaration was signed by China and the United Kingdom, stipulating that the sovereignty and the administrative management of Hong Kong would be handed over back to China on 1 July 1997 under the "one country, two systems" framework. In 1987, the Joint Declaration on the Question of Macau was signed by China and Portugal, stipulating that the sovereignty and the administrative management of Macau would be handed over back to China 20 December 1999, again under the "one country, two systems" framework.

In 1989, the relation between China and the Soviet Union returned to normal for the first time since the Sino-Soviet split in the 1950s. Mikhail Gorbachev, then General Secretary of the Communist Party of the Soviet Union, visited Beijing and met with Deng Xiaoping during the Sino-Soviet Summit, which took place amid the Tiananmen Square protests.

After the 1989 Tiananmen Square protests and massacre, China faced strong backlash from the western countries. Deng, as a response, devised a new set of diplomatic strategies for China, which were summarised to be "hide your strength, bide your time, never take the lead". In the 1980s and early 1990s, People's Republic of China continued to establish formal diplomatic relations with a number of countries such as United Arab Emirates (1984), Qatar (1988), Saudi Arabia (1990), Singapore (1990), Israel (1992) and South Korea (1992).

=== Disasters ===
Only major disasters are presented below (click to show).

| Time | Disaster | Location | Deaths | Descriptions |
|---|---|---|---|---|
| 1977 | Russian flu | Worldwide | | The pandemic started in northern China and Siberia, during the transition period (1976–78). Around 700,000 deaths worldwide. The virus is widely believed to have been leaked from a lab. |
| 1981 | Dawu earthquake | Sichuan | 150 | Some 300 people were injured. |
| 1982 | Flight 3303 accident | Guangxi | 112 | CAAC Airlines plane crash. |
| 1987 | Black Dragon fire | Daxing'anling Prefecture, Heilongjiang | Over 200 | The fire also spread to the Soviet Union. It was one of the largest wildfires in history. |
| 1988 | Flight 4146 accident | Chongqing | 108 | China Southwest Airlines plane crash. |
| 1988 | Lancang earthquake | Yunnan | 748 | Additionally, about 7700 were injured. |

=== Controversies ===
After the Cultural Revolution, Deng started the Boluan Fanzheng program to correct the Maoist mistakes, but some of his policies and views were controversial. Deng insisted on praising that Mao had done "7 good and 3 bad" for the Chinese people, while attributing numerous disasters in the Cultural Revolution to Lin Biao and the Gang of Four. In addition, in order to maintain the one-party state in China for the Chinese Communist Party (CCP), Deng proposed the "Four Cardinal Principles" at the CCP Theory Conference in March 1979, which soon became the limit of political liberalization in mainland China and were incorporated in the Constitution of China (1982).

Moreover, the role that Deng played in the 1989 Tiananmen Square protests and massacre was rather controversial. In fact, he also cracked down the Democracy Wall movement as well as the Beijing Spring in early 1980s. Political campaigns such as Campaign against spiritual pollution in 1983 and Anti-Bourgeois Liberalisation Campaign in 1986-1987 were also launched, and many liberal officials and intellectuals including Hu Yaobang were purged or penalized.

To cope with the population crisis after Mao's era, Deng Xiaoping, together with other senior officials including Chen Yun and Li Xiannian, supported the implementation of the "one-child policy". Some of the extreme measures in practice created many controversies such as human rights violations.

== Jiang Zemin and the third generation (1989–2002) ==
=== Transition of power and Deng's Southern Tour ===
After the 1989 Tiananmen Square protests and massacre, Deng Xiaoping stepped away from public view and fully retired. Power passed to the third generation of leadership led by Jiang Zemin, who was hailed as its "core". However, owing to the Tiananmen massacre, the Reforms and Opening-up program went into stagnation in early 1990s, and Jiang, supported by left-wing conservatives, was not doing enough to continue the reforms.

In the spring of 1992, Deng made his famous tour to southern China, which is widely regarded as a critical point in the history of modern China as it saved China's economic reform as well as the capital market (Shanghai Stock Exchange and Shenzhen Stock Exchange), and preserved the stability of the society; a number of remarks made by Deng during the trip became vastly influential and popular within the Chinese society, including the Cat Theory which Deng originally proposed in the 1960s. Jiang eventually sided with Deng and publicly supported the Reforms and Opening-up program. Conservative Li Peng served as the Premier of China until 1998, when reformist Zhu Rongji succeeded him as the new Premier.

=== Domestic affairs ===
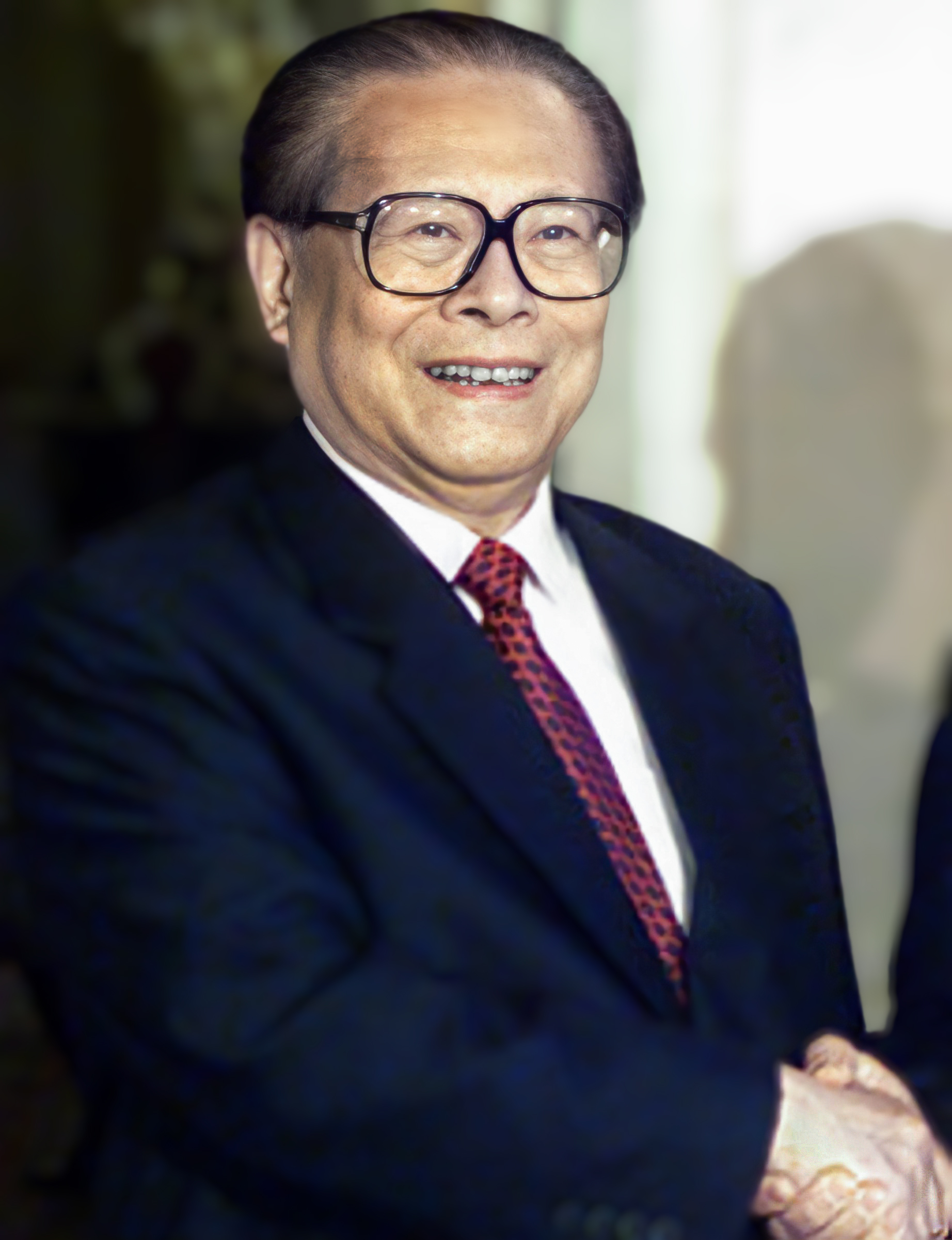
Jiang Zemin

Economic growth achieved a sustained high rate by the mid-1990s. Jiang Zemin's macroeconomic reforms furthered Deng's vision for "Socialism with Chinese characteristics". Jiang laid heavy emphasis on scientific and technological advancement in areas such as space exploration. At the same time, Jiang's period saw a continued rise in social corruption in all areas of life. Unemployment skyrocketed as unprofitable State-owned enterprises (SOE) were closed to make way for more competitive ventures internally and abroad. The ill-equipped social welfare system was put on a serious test. In 2000, Jiang proposed his ideology of "Three Represents", which was ratified by the Chinese Communist Party at the Sixteenth Party Congress in 2002.

At the same time, Premier Zhu Rongji's economic policies held China's economy strong during the 1997 Asian financial crisis. Economic growth averaged at 8% annually, pushed back by the 1998 Yangtze River Floods. Standards of living improved significantly, although a wide urban-rural wealth gap was created as China saw the reappearance of the middle class. Wealth disparity between the Eastern coastal regions and the Western hinterlands continued to widen by the day, prompting government programs to "develop the West", taking on ambitious projects such as the Qinghai–Tibet railway. However, rampant corruption continued despite Premier Zhu's anti-corruption campaign that executed many officials. Corruption alone was estimated to amount to the equivalent of anywhere from 10 to 20 per cent of China's GDP.

To sustain the increased electricity consumption, the Three Gorges Dam was built, attracting supporters and widespread criticism. Environmental pollution became a very serious problem as Beijing was frequently hit by sandstorms as a result of desertification.

In 1990s, Project 211 and Project 985 were launched for higher education in China.

=== Foreign relations ===
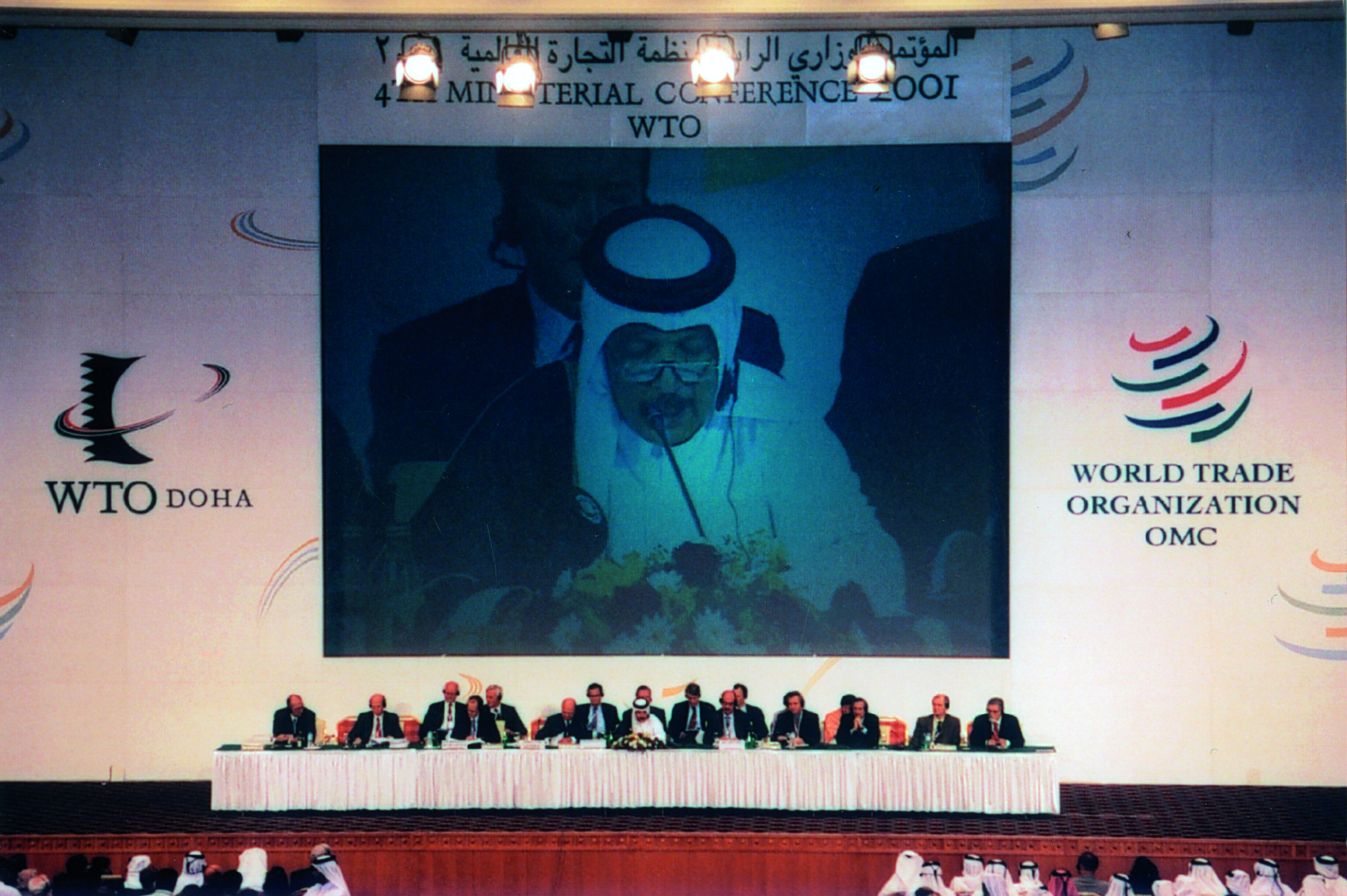
On 10 November 2001, the Ministerial Conference of the World Trade Organization (WTO) in Doha approved China's entry into the WTO.

In November 1991, China joined the Asia-Pacific Economic Cooperation. The 1990s saw the peaceful Handover of Hong Kong and Macau by the United Kingdom and Portugal respectively to China. Hong Kong and Macau mostly continued their own governance, retaining independence in their economic, social, and judicial systems until 2019, when Beijing tried to expand national powers in the face of large-scale protests in Hong Kong. Regarding the issue of Taiwan, Jiang published his Eight Points in January 1995, seeking "peaceful reunification".

In the 1990s, CCP General Secretary Jiang Zemin and U.S. President Bill Clinton exchanged state visits, but Sino-American relations took very sour turns at the end of the decade, especially after the third Taiwan Strait Crisis. On 7 May 1999, during the Kosovo War, U.S. aircraft bombed the Chinese embassy in Belgrade. The U.S. government claimed the strike was due to bad intelligence and false target identification. Inside the United States, the Cox Report stated that China had been stealing various top United States military secrets. In 2001, a United States surveillance plane collided with a Chinese fighter jet over international waters near Hainan, inciting further outrage with the Chinese public, already dissatisfied with the United States.

After a decade of talks, China was finally admitted into the World Trade Organization in 2001. The same year saw the establishment of the Shanghai Cooperation Organisation. In August 2002, due to the efforts of the renowned mathematician Shiing-Shen Chern, the quadrennial International Congress of Mathematicians was held in Beijing – the first time in a developing country, with Chern being the honorary president of the Congress and Wu Wenjun being the president.

=== Disasters ===
Only major disasters are presented below (click to show).

| Time | Disaster | Location | Deaths | Descriptions |
|---|---|---|---|---|
| 1990 | Guangzhou Baiyun airport collisions | Guangdong | 128 | Hijacking of a plane led to runway collision. |
| 1992 | Eastern China flood | East China | At least 431 | At least 267 deaths in Anhui and 164 in Jiangsu. Some other sources claim the death toll was over 1,000. |
| 1992 | Flight 7552 accident | Jiangsu | 106–109 | China General Aviation plane crash. |
| 1992 | Flight 3943 accident | Guangxi | 141 | China Southern Airlines plane crash. |
| 1994 | Flight 2303 accident | Shaanxi | 160 | China Northwest Airlines plane crash. |
| 1994 | Typhoon Fred | Zhejiang | 1,426 | Known as the Typhoon 9417 in China. |
| 1994 | Karamay fire | Xinjiang | 325 | A major controversy was that the students were told to remain seated to allow government officials to escape the fire first. 288 schoolchildren were killed. |
| 1996 | Lijiang earthquake | Yunnan | 309 | Magnitude 6.6 M_{w}. |
| 1996 | Typhoon Herb | Fujian | 779 | Known as the Typhoon 9608 in China. |
| 1997 | Asian financial crisis | Asia | | Affected China's economy to an extent. |
| 1998 | Yangtze River floods | Yangtze River and others | 3,000–4,150 | The event was considered the worst Northern China flood in 40 years. |
| 2001 | Shijiazhuang bombings | Hebei | 108 | |
| 2002 | Flight 6136 accident | Liaoning | 112 | China Northern Airlines plane crash. |

=== Controversies ===
On the political agenda, China was once again put on the spotlight for the banning of public Falun Gong activity in 1999. Silent protesters from the spiritual movement sat outside of Zhongnanhai, asking for dialogue with China's leaders. Jiang saw it as a threat to the political situation and outlawed the group altogether, while using mass media propaganda to denounce it as an "evil cult".

Jiang Zemin, after formally retiring as the paramount leader of China in 2004, was believed to have moved behind the scenes and was still in control of the country even after his late step-down from the Chairman of the Central Military Commission in 2005. The Jiang faction, including Zhou Yongkang, Guo Boxiong and Xu Caihou, continued to impact China significantly after Hu Jintao succeeded as the paramount leader of China.

== Hu Jintao and the fourth generation (2002–2012) ==
=== Transition of power ===
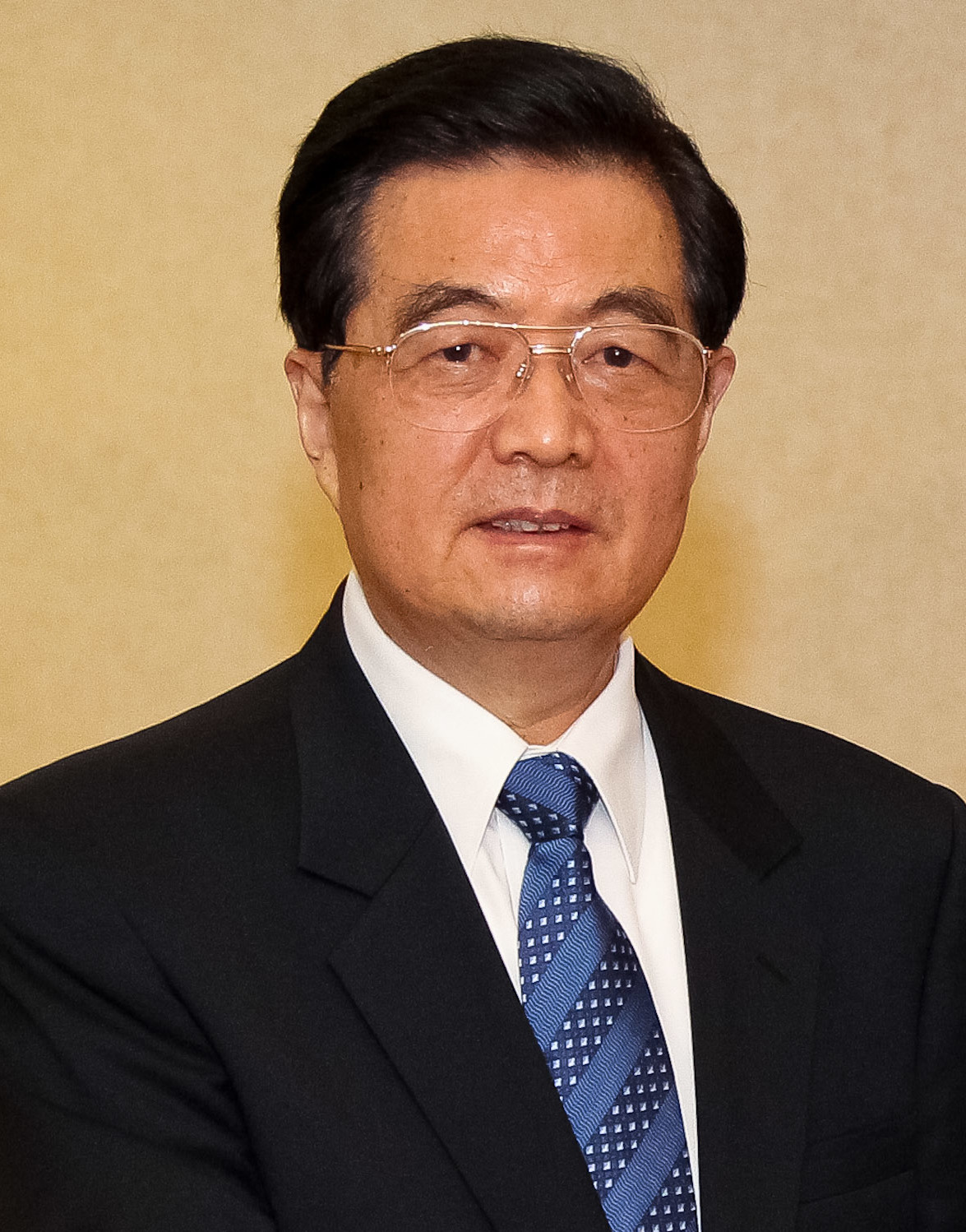
Hu Jintao

Hu Jintao succeeded as the General Secretary of the Chinese Communist Party in November 2002. In March 2003, Hu Jintao became the president of China, with Wen Jiabao being the premier of China. In September 2004, Hu Jintao became the chairman of the Central Military Commission.

=== Domestic affairs ===
The economy continued to grow in double-digit numbers as the development of rural areas became the major focus of government policy. In 2010, China overtook Japan as the world's second-largest economy. The assertion of the Scientific Perspective to create a Socialist Harmonious Society was the focus of the Hu Jintao – Wen Jiabao administration, as some Jiang Zemin-era excesses were slowly reversed. In late 2002, the South–North Water Transfer Project began construction.

In gradual steps to consolidate his power, Hu Jintao removed Shanghai Party secretary Chen Liangyu and other potential political opponents amidst the fight against corruption, and the ongoing struggle against once powerful Shanghai clique. In particular, in 2012, the Wang Lijun incident and the scandal of Bo Xilai received widespread attention and media coverage.

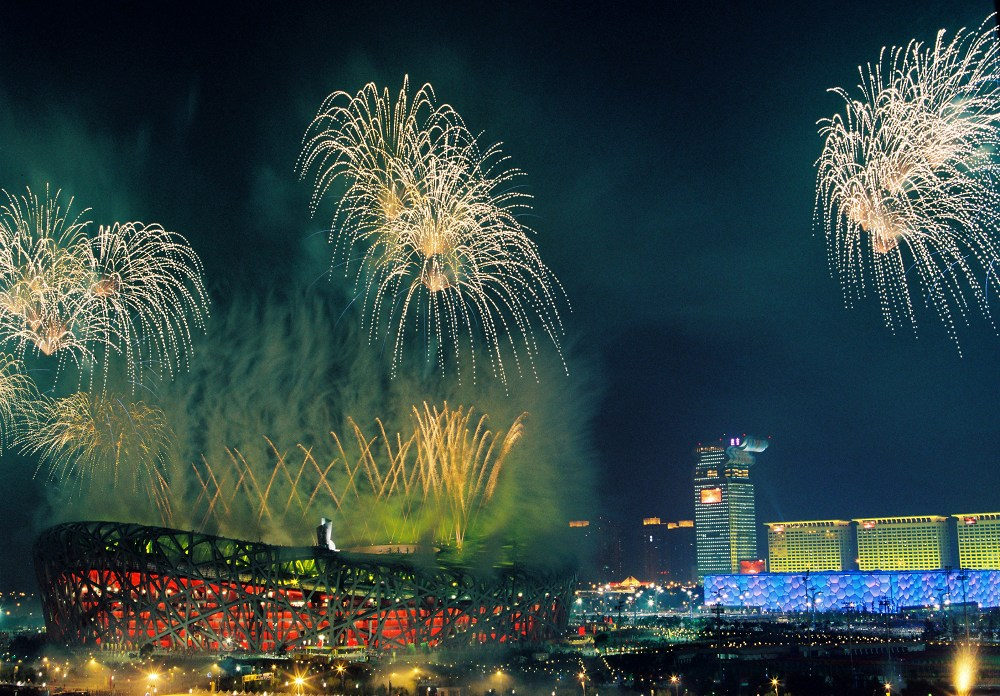
The 2008 Beijing Olympics

The continued economic growth of the country as well as its sporting power status gained China the right to host the 2008 Summer Olympics. However, this also put Hu Jintao's administration under intense spotlight. While the 2008 Olympics was commonly understood to boost the soft power of the People's Republic of China, in light of the March 2008 Tibet protests, the government also received heavy scrutiny. The Olympic torch was met with protest en route; within the country, these reactions were met with a fervent wave of nationalism with accusations of Western bias against China.

Continued economic growth during the 2008 financial crisis which started in the United States and hobbled the world economy increased China's confidence in its model of development and convinced elites that the global balance of power was shifting. In the Chinese view, the cause of the crisis was Western countries' "inappropriate macroeconomic policies" and "unsustainable modes of development." When Western countries were nearing financial disaster, China created credit for spending on infrastructure. This both helped stabilize the global economy and it also provided an opportunity for China to retool its own infrastructure. China increased its standing as a responsible global actor during the crisis.

Meanwhile, a number of scientific progresses and breakthroughs took place between 2002 and 2012, many of which originated from the 863 Program. In 2003, China successfully sent an astronaut, Yang Liwei, to the space via Shenzhou 5, becoming the third country in the world to do so independently after the United States and the Soviet Union. In 2010, Jiaolong, the Chinese crewed deep-sea research submersible, was deployed. In 2011–2012, BeiDou-2, the Chinese satellite navigation system, became operational. In 2011, Tiangong-1, the first prototype space station of China, was successfully launched. In March 2012, results from the Daya Bay Reactor Neutrino Experiment in Shenzhen received international attention. In October 2012, Mo Yan became the first Chinese citizen (mainland) to win the Nobel Prize in Literature.

=== Foreign relations ===
China's position in the war on terror drew the country closer diplomatically to the United States. In 2010, the Asian Games was held in Guangzhou, and in 2011, the Summer Universiade was held in Shenzhen. In 2010, another international event took place in China— Shanghai held the World Expo for the first time.

The political status and future of Taiwan remain uncertain, but steps have been taken to improving relations between the Communist Party and several of Taiwan's parties that hold a less antagonistic view towards China, notably former rival Kuomintang. On December 31, 2008, Hu Jintao published his Six Points to promote the peaceful development of cross-strait relations and to realize the great rejuvenation of the Chinese nation.

Hu's critics say that his government was overly aggressive in asserting its new power, overestimated its reach, and raised the ire and apprehension of various neighbours, including Southeast Asian countries, India, and Japan. Such policies are also said to be provocative towards the United States.

=== Disasters ===
Only major disasters are presented below (click to show).

| Time | Disaster | Location | Deaths | Descriptions |
|---|---|---|---|---|
| 2003 | SARS epidemic | Nationwide | 349 (mainland China) | SARS killed 774 people globally, with 349 in mainland China and 299 in Hong Kong. |
| 2005 | Sunjiawan mine disaster | Liaoning | 214 | |
| 2005 | Shalan Town flood | Heilongjiang | 117 | 105 students were killed. |
| 2008 | 2008 financial crisis | Global | | Affected China's economy to an extent. |
| 2008 | Chinese winter storms | Southern and central China | At least 129 | |
| 2008 | Zibo train collision | Shandong | 72 | 416 injuries. |
| 2008 | Sichuan earthquake | Sichuan | 69,227 | Magnitude 8.0 M_{s}. |
| 2008 | South China floods | South China | Over 200 | Severe flooding in the provinces of Anhui, Hunan, Jiangxi, Fujian and Guangdong, with dozens of fatalities and over a million people forced to evacuate. |
| 2008 | Shanxi mudslide | Shanxi | 277 | 4 missing. |
| 2009 | Heilongjiang mine explosion | Heilongjiang | 108 | |
| 2010 | Yushu earthquake | Qinghai | 2,698 | 270 missing. |
| 2010 | China floods | Nationwide | 3,185 | 1060 missing. |
| 2010 | Gansu mudslide | Gansu | 1,557 | |
| 2012 | Beijing flood | Beijing | 79 | |

=== Controversies ===
In the years after Hu Jintao's rise to power, respect of basic human rights in China continued to be a source of concern. Liu Xiaobo, Nobel Peace Prize winner and human rights activist, was arrested and sentenced to jail for 11 years in 2010. Liu Xiaobo, together with others, authored the Charter 08 and received the Nobel Peace Prize in 2010. Liu Xiaobo died in 2017.

In Hu Jintao's time, the Chinese Communist Party and the Chinese government created the "50 Cent Party", attempting to "guide" public opinions online in favor of the Communist Party and the Chinese government.

== Xi Jinping and the fifth generation (2012–present) ==
=== Transition of power ===
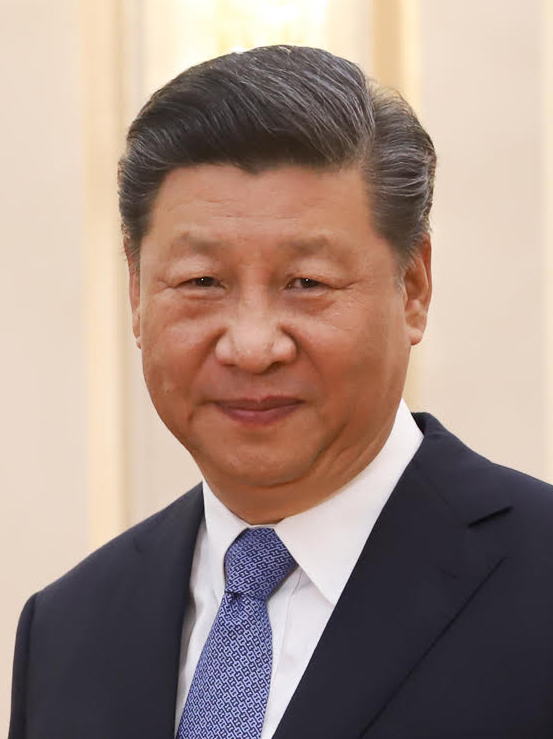
General Secretary Xi Jinping

Xi Jinping became the General Secretary of the Chinese Communist Party and the Chairman of the Central Military Commission, the two most powerful positions on 15 November 2012. And on March 14, 2013, he became the 7th President of China. Li Keqiang became the Premier of China in March 2013.

In October 2022, Xi Jinping was re-elected as General Secretary of the Chinese Communist Party for a precedent-breaking third term of paramount leader after Mao Zedong's death. In March 2023, Xi continued as the President of China for a third term, while Li Qiang succeeded Li Keqiang as the new Premier of China.

=== Domestic affairs ===
A massive, long-term anti-corruption campaign has been carried out under Xi Jinping since 2012, mostly targeting Xi Jinping's political rivals such as members of the Jiang faction including Party senior leaders Zhou Yongkang, Guo Boxiong and Xu Caihou.

In March 2018, the Party-controlled National People's Congress passed a set of constitutional amendments including the removal of term limits for the president and vice president, the creation of a National Supervisory Commission, as well as enhancing the central role of the Communist Party. On 17 March 2018, the Chinese legislature re-appointed Xi Jinping as president, now without term limits. According to the Financial Times, Xi Jinping expressed his views of constitutional amendment at meetings with Chinese officials and foreign dignitaries. Xi Jinping explained the decision in terms of needing to align two more powerful posts – General Secretary of the Chinese Communist Party and Chairman of the Central Military Commission (CMC) – which have no term limits. However, Xi Jinping did not say whether he intended to serve as party general secretary, CMC chairman and state president, for three or more terms.

On the other hand, a series of scientific advances took place. In 2013, the Yutu rover was successfully deployed on the Moon after the Chang'e 3 lander landed on the Moon. In 2015, Tu Youyou became the first Chinese citizen (mainland) to win the Nobel Prize in Physiology or Medicine. In December 2015, the Dark Matter Particle Explorer, China's first space observatory, was successfully launched. The Tiangong-2 space laboratory was successfully launched in 2016, and in the same year the Five-hundred-meter Aperture Spherical Telescope (FAST) was built in Guizhou. In 2018, the Hong Kong–Zhuhai–Macau Bridge, world's longest sea-crossing bridge, was open to public.

=== Foreign relations ===
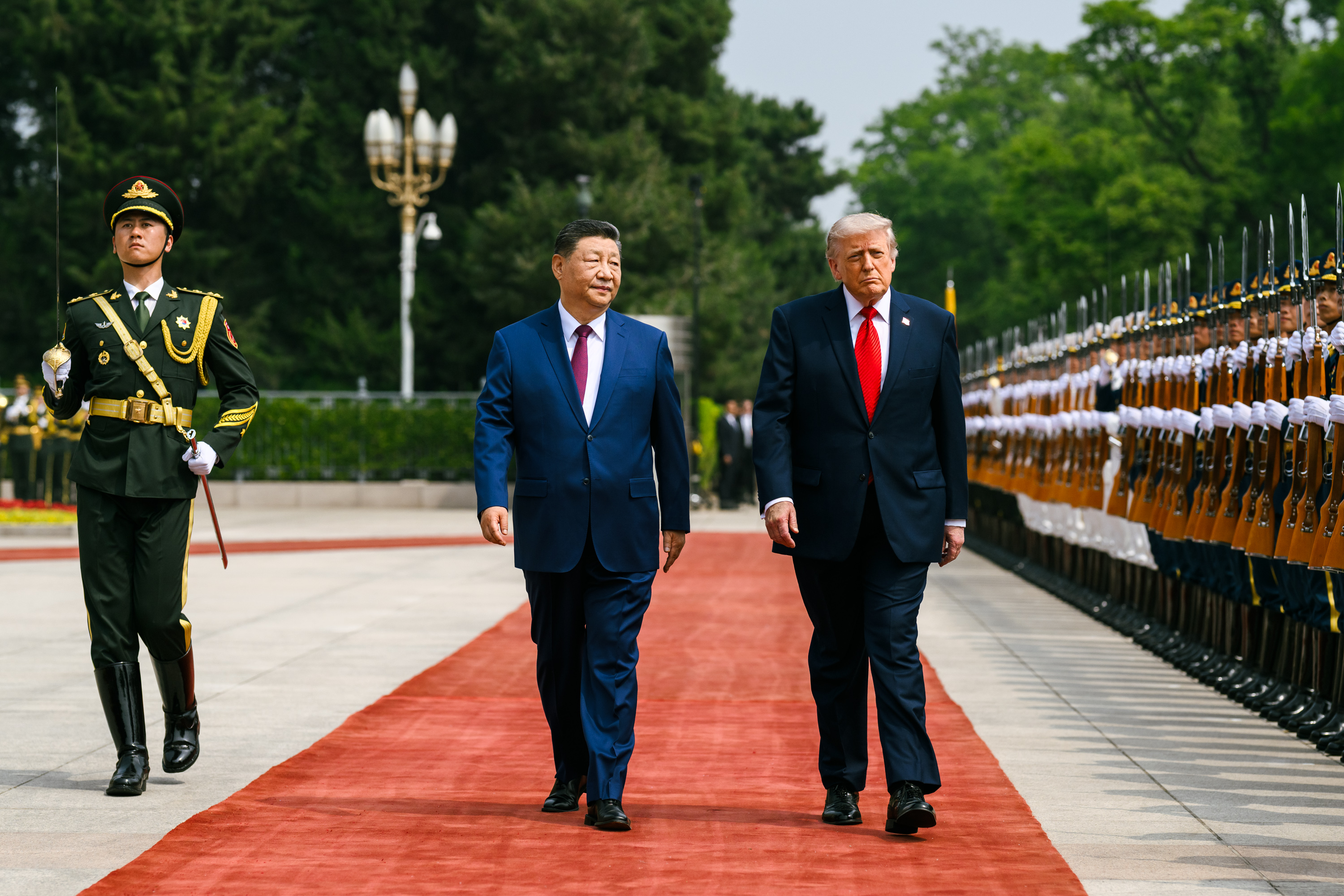
CCP General Secretary Xi Jinping received U.S. President Donald Trump in Beijing in May 2026 (China–United States relations)

As Xi Jinping continued to consolidate power domestically, he gradually abandoned the diplomatic principles ("hide your strength, bide your time, never take the lead") set by Deng Xiaoping and appeared more as a "strongman" in the global stage. He launched the "One Belt One Road initiative" to make infrastructure investment in dozens of countries, which received widespread attention (both receptions and criticism) from around the world.

Since Xi Jinping succeeded as the leader of China, he tried to change "China's passivity" into an assertive strategy to defend China's claims over border and territory disputes such as in the South China Sea and in Taiwan. In 2018, China–United States trade war started and significantly affected the global economy. In May 2020, China–India skirmishes along the border broke out and resulted in casualties.

On the other hand, after Xi Jinping came to power, a number of international summits were held in China. In 2014, the 22nd annual gathering of Asia-Pacific Economic Cooperation (APEC) leaders was held in Beijing; in 2016, the G20 summit was held in Hangzhou; and in 2017, the 9th BRICS summit was held in Xiamen. Additionally, in 2015, the Ma–Xi meeting in Singapore was the first meeting between the political leaders of the two sides of the Taiwan Strait since the end of the Chinese Civil War in 1950.

China refused to condemn the Russian invasion of Ukraine, repeated Russian narratives about the war, opposed economic sanctions against Russia, and abstained or sided with Russia in UN votes on the war in Ukraine.

=== Disasters ===
Only major disasters are presented below (click to show).

| Time | Disaster | Location | Death | Descriptions |
|---|---|---|---|---|
| 2013 | Lushan earthquake | Sichuan | Over 200 | Magnitude 7.0 M_{s}. |
| 2014 | Kunshan explosion | Jiangsu | 146 | 114 injuries. |
| 2014 | Ludian earthquake | Yunnan | At least 617 | Magnitude 6.5 M_{L}. |
| 2015 | Sinking of Dongfang zhi Xing | Hubei | At least 442 | On 1 June 2015, a river cruise named "Dongfang zhi Xing" with 454 people on board capsized in Jianli, Hubei. |
| 2015 | Tianjin explosions | Tianjin | 173 | 798 injuries. |
| 2015 | Shenzhen landslide | Guangdong | At least 73 | 4 missing. |
| 2016 | 2016 China floods | Yangtze River and others | At least 449 | |
| 2016 | Jiangsu tornado | Jiangsu | 99 | 846 injuries. |
| 2019 | Xiangshui chemical plant explosion | Jiangsu | 78 | 617 injuries. |
| 2019–2023 | COVID-19 pandemic | Global | Ongoing | In December 2019, an epidemic caused by a novel coronavirus (later identified as the cause of COVID-19) broke out in Wuhan, Hubei. On 11 March 2020, the World Health Organization declared COVID-19 as a pandemic. |
| 2020 | 2020 China floods | Southern China | 219 | 63.46 million people affected. |
| 2021 | Henan floods | Henan | 398 | |
| 2022 | Flight 5735 accident | Guangxi | 132 | |
| 2023 | 2023 China floods | Beijing-Tianjin-Hebei | 81 | 34 missing. |
| 2023 | Jishishan earthquake | Gansu | 151 | 982 injuries. |
| 2025 | 2025 Tibet earthquake | Tibet | 126 | 201 injuries |
| 2025 | Wang Fuk Court fire | Hong Kong | 168 | |

=== Controversies ===
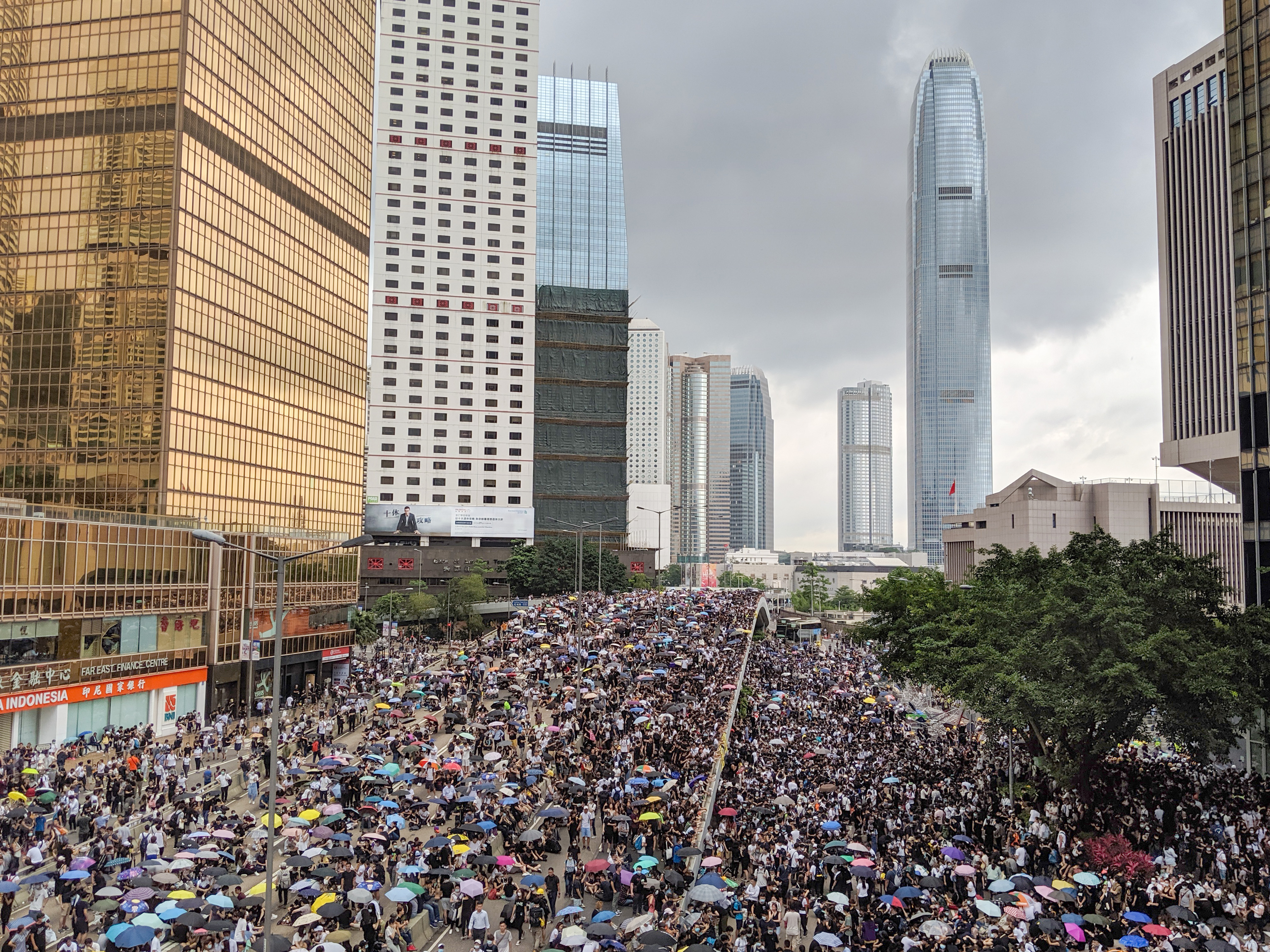
The 2019 Hong Kong protests

Since 2012, Xi Jinping together with his allies has rolled back several policies from the Boluan Fanzheng period of Deng Xiaoping and promoted his cult of personality as Mao Zedong did. For example, in 2018, Xi Jinping eliminated the term limit in China's Constitution for Chinese President, which challenged some of the political legacies of Deng Xiaoping and triggered concerns about a return to a one-man rule similar to Mao.

Domestic human rights violation has deteriorated. In July 2015, hundreds of Chinese lawyers and human rights activists nationwide were detained or arrested during the 709 crackdown. Moreover, the Xinjiang re-education camps since 2017, in which over a million Uyghurs and other ethnic minorities are being detained, and the massive protests in Hong Kong since 2019 have received widespread attention and extensive media coverage from around the world. The Hong Kong national security law published on 30 June 2020 also received widespread attention and raised considerable concern worldwide over the breach of the "One Country, Two Systems" principle.

After Xi Jinping came to power in 2012, the Communist Party along with the Chinese government have significantly strengthened their internet censorship and tightened their control over the Chinese internet environment, blocking Chinese citizens' access to many foreign websites and mobile apps using the "Great Firewall". At the same time, a large number of "50 Cent Party" members have been recruited to "guide" online narratives around the globe in favor of the Party and the Government. During the massive Hong Kong protests, for instance, Twitter and Facebook claimed to have removed or suspended over 200,000 accounts and pages linked with the Chinese government. As of 2022, the mass surveillance system keeps the whole population under close watch.

Globally, the aggressive "wolf warrior diplomacy" under general secretaryship of Xi Jinping has created numerous controversies and backlashes. Controversies also surround China's handling of the outbreak of a novel coronavirus (COVID-19) as well as its relationship with the World Health Organization (WHO) was rather controversial. There have been a large number of conspiracy theories and misinformation related to COVID-19, including the origin of the virus. China has also launched its own disinformation campaign globally over the issues of the pandemic,and more, promoting China as a global leader while attacking the United States for instance. Furthermore, manipulation of economic data by the Chinese government, such as publishing inflated GDP figures over the years, is also a major concern.

== See also ==
- Outline of the Chinese Civil War
- Outline of the military history of the People's Republic of China
- Timeline of the Chinese Civil War
- History of China
- History of the Republic of China
- Timeline of Chinese history
- Timeline of the history of the People's Republic of China
