= Special supply system of China =

Chinese government service for elites

The special supply system of the People's Republic of China, called tegong, is a system organized by the government of China and the Chinese Communist Party (CCP) to provide specific supplies and living services to government officials and special individuals. Senior officials can enjoy such special treatment for life. This system was established in the early days of the founding of the People's Republic of China, officially implemented by the central government, and has been maintained to this day.

== History ==
=== Early years ===
After the Chinese Communist Party established the People's Republic of China in 1949, the General Office of the CCP Central Committee and the Ministry of Public Security decided to establish Xiangshan Farm (now called Jushan Farm) in Beijing. On February 14, 1950, the People's Republic of China and the Soviet Union signed the 30-year Sino-Soviet Treaty of Friendship, Alliance and Mutual Assistance. Subsequently, the Soviet Union sent two experts in health care and food nutrition research to Beijing and made many suggestions on the products, scale, preservation, disinfection, testing and epidemic prevention of Xiangshan Farm. Xiangshan Farm was managed by the Security Bureau of the General Office of the CCP Central Committee and provided special agricultural products for senior cadres, establishing a special food supply system for central leaders. The special supply system originated in the early days of the founding of the People's Republic of China. For example, the predecessor of Zhongnanhai cigarettes was the No. 2 special supply cigarette selected by Mao Zedong, and Maotai liquor in the early days of the founding of the People's Republic of China was a special supply liquor that only provincial departments could obtain.

During the Great Chinese Famine, on July 30, 1960, Qi Yanming, then Deputy Secretary-General of the State Council, drafted a report on the issue of providing preferential treatment to senior cadres and senior intellectuals in Beijing in terms of the supply of non-staple food. On August 1, the General Office of the CCP Central Committee agreed to the content of the report and sent it to various central ministries, the National People's Congress, the State Council, the National Committee of the Chinese People's Political Consultative Conference, the Supreme People's Court, the Supreme People's Procuratorate, the Chinese Academy of Sciences and other organs and units. On November 9, when the CCP Central Committee distributed the report to all regions of the country, it changed the phrase "providing preferential treatment in terms of the supply of non-staple food" to "special supply" and believed that the report was also applicable to all regions of the country in principle. From then on, a unified national special supply system for senior cadres was established. The following are some people's memories of special supply during the famine.

- Senior official Wei Junyi recalled the special food supplies during the three difficult years: "Later, the central government finally decided to implement a food subsidy for cadres. This was probably because some elderly democratic figures could not bear such hardships and some had already fallen ill. The subsidy was one pound of sugar and one pound of beans per month for each person above level 17, two pounds of meat and two pounds of eggs per month for each person above level 13, and four pounds of meat and two pounds of eggs per month for each person above level 9."
- Wang Feng, then secretary of the Gansu Provincial Committee of the Chinese Communist Party, wrote an investigation report to Mao Zedong: From April 27 to 29, 1961, Comrade Wang Feng led five people to investigate rural canteens in the Xinji Commune No. 1 Production Brigade in Linxia Prefecture, Gansu Province, and conducted in-depth research on women's diseases and women's fertility. They found that during the three years of the Gansu Great Famine, relatively rare women's diseases such as uterine prolapse and amenorrhea appeared in rural areas. Uterine prolapse was caused by malnutrition caused by hunger and excessive physical labor, and excessive hunger caused amenorrhea. Only the wives of cadres had normal menstruation.
- Cheng Dan, daughter of Cheng Qian, vice chairman of the Standing Committee of the National People's Congress, recalled in an interview with the National Humanities and History magazine: " Even during the difficult times, the supply in Beidaihe was always good."
- When recalling the three difficult years, historian Wang Zengyu said that he felt angry when he saw the fat belly of the high- ranking president of Peking University. In addition, "in the cold winter, when the north wind was howling all day long, there were deaths every other day in the village. Most of the dead were elderly people, who had actually caught colds from hunger and cold, and then became incurable diseases."

Thereafter, against the backdrop of a long-term shortage of materials in Chinese society and a shortage of food and daily necessities for the general public, the scope of special supplies expanded to include tobacco, alcohol, and clothing. For example, the items specially supplied to Mao Zedong personally included "Mao porcelain" from Liling, Hunan, and "7501 Mao porcelain" from Jingdezhen, Jiangxi.

=== After the reform and opening up ===
After the reform and opening up, on November 13, 1979, the "CCP Central Committee and the State Council’s Several Regulations on the Living Allowances of Senior Cadres" was issued, which stated that senior cadres should pay for their own water and electricity bills. If public and private use are mixed and it is not possible to install separate electricity and water meters, the expenses should be reasonably shared in proportion to the actual consumption of water and electricity. In July 1989, the Politburo meeting document "The CCP Central Committee and the State Council’s Decision on Doing Several Things of Public Concern in the Near Future" called for the cancellation of special food supplies, but this was not implemented.

In 2004, the State Administration for Industry and Commerce issued an "Emergency Notice on Strictly Prohibiting the Use of the Name of State Organs in Commercial Advertisements" to crack down on operators who hyped up the concepts of special supply and exclusive supply, especially the use of packaging and labels containing the words "special supply by state organs". In the following period, the rectification was basically carried out every one or two years, but the effect was not very ideal. In 2007, Ren Yuling, a member of the National Committee of the Chinese People's Political Consultative Conference and a consultant to the State Council, proposed to reform the lifetime system of treatment for senior cadres, but received no response.

In March 2013, the State Administration of Civil Service and five other departments jointly issued the "Notice on Strictly Prohibiting the Central and State Organs from Using Labels Such as "Special Supply" and "Special Supply"". On November 28, the CCP Central Committee and the State Council again issued the "Several Provisions on the Living Benefits of Senior Officials", but failed to solve the problem of privilege. On November 29, the State Food and Drug Administration required all regions to prohibit the production of liquor with labels such as "special supply", "special supply", "special use", "specially made", and "special demand".

In 2022, the General Logistics Department of the Central Military Commission and five other departments jointly issued a "Notice on Prohibition of the Sale of Military-Branded Tobacco, Alcohol and Other Products".

== Special supply system and food safety ==
Some believe that the special food supply system is one of the reasons for the frequent occurrence of food safety problems in China. Officials who enjoy special food supplies are precisely those who have supervisory duties, or officials who have the duty to urge supervisory officials to exercise their powers in accordance with the law. However, because they enjoy special food supplies, they will not be motivated to investigate and punish illegal vendors. In 2011, Chinese writer Zhao Lihua said that abolishing special food supplies can fundamentally solve China's food safety problems. She believes that "the privileged class eats well, but does not care whether the common people eat well. If the special food supply is abolished nationwide, those privileged people will have to go to the vegetable market to buy vegetables like everyone else. In this way, they will consider the health and safety of themselves, their children, and their descendants."

On the other hand, there is also the problem of "fake special supply" in the market. With the continuous development of the market economy, any product with a little reputation has been labeled as special supply or exclusive supply. The products involved have also expanded from tobacco and alcohol to tea, beverages, food and even other daily necessities. In the field of counterfeiting so-called "special supply wine", a complete criminal chain has been formed, including packaging production, filling, and sales. It is sold through direct telephone sales, online live broadcasts, and mixed with military supplies. The counterfeited wines include brands such as Wuliangye and Moutai. The claimed special supply forms include so-called special wines for commemorative activities and special wines for the military. The raw materials of these counterfeit wines can be divided into using low-end wines as good ones and using alcohol and flavors to blend according to needs and selling prices.

== See also ==
- Food safety incidents in China
- Beijing Food Supply Department No. 34
