= Chronology of major events in the People's Republic of China =

Timeline of major events in the People's Republic of China since 1949

This chronology of major events in the People's Republic of China (PRC) provides a comprehensive developmental timeline from its founding in 1949 to the present. The timeline is organized by leadership eras and major socio-political movements.

== Mao Zedong era (1949–1976) ==
=== Consolidation and Socialist Transformation (1949–1956) ===
- 1949

- 1 October: The Proclamation of the People's Republic of China takes place at Tiananmen Square. The Central People's Government is established with Beijing as the capital.
- 21 October: Mao Zedong announces the personnel for the Government Administration Council, with Zhou Enlai as Premier and Minister of Foreign Affairs.
- 10 December: The People's Liberation Army (PLA) occupies Chengdu, forcing the Republic of China government to retreat to Taiwan.

- 1950

- 14 February: The Sino-Soviet Treaty of Friendship, Alliance and Mutual Assistance is signed in Moscow.
- 1 May: The New Marriage Law is promulgated, marking one of the first major social reforms.
- 30 June: The Land Reform Movement is launched. While redistributing land, it results in the deaths of an estimated 1 million to 5 million people and the elimination of the traditional rural elite.
- 10 October: The Campaign to Suppress Counterrevolutionaries begins. Official data records over 700,000 to 800,000 deaths, while scholarly estimates suggest 1 million to 2 million executions.
- October: China enters the Korean War as the People's Volunteer Army crosses the Yalu River.

- 1951–1955

- 23 May 1951: The Seventeen Point Agreement is signed; the PRC asserts sovereignty over Tibet.
- 1953: The First Five-Year Plan is initiated.
- April 1955: Zhou Enlai leads the PRC delegation to the Bandung Conference.
- 1 October 1955: The Xinjiang Uyghur Autonomous Region is officially established.
- 28 October 1955: Scientist Qian Xuesen returns to China.

- 1956

- 15–27 September: The 8th National Congress of the CPC is held in Beijing, the first such congress since the PRC's founding. Mao Zedong is elected Chairman.

=== Radicalization and Internal Conflicts (1957–1976) ===
- 1957

- 8 June: Following the Hundred Flowers Campaign, the Anti-Rightist Campaign is launched. At least 550,000 intellectuals are labeled "rightists" and persecuted.
- October: The Soviet Union agrees to provide China with atomic bomb technology.

- 1958–1962

- 1958: Mao launches the Great Leap Forward and the People's Commune movement.
- 1959–1961: The Great Chinese Famine occurs. Scholarly estimates of excess deaths range from 15 million to 45 million.
- 1962: The Sino-Indian War takes place in October and November.

- 1966–1976

- May 1966: The Cultural Revolution begins with the "May 16 Notification".
- 13 September 1971: The Lin Biao incident occurs; Mao's designated successor dies in a plane crash.
- 1976:

- 8 January: Death of Zhou Enlai.
- 9 September: Death of Mao Zedong.
- 6 October: The Arrest of the Gang of Four marks the effective end of the Cultural Revolution.

== Transition and Deng Xiaoping Era (1977–1989) ==
- 1977: The National College Entrance Examination (Gaokao) is reinstated in December after a ten-year suspension.
- 1978: The 3rd Plenary Session of the 11th CPC Central Committee in December marks the launch of Reform and Opening-up.
- 1979:

- 1 January: Establishment of formal diplomatic relations with the U.S.
- 17 February: The Sino-Vietnamese War begins.

- 1980: Shenzhen is designated as the first Special Economic Zone; the Gang of Four trial begins.
- 1982: The Current Constitution is adopted; the population surpasses 1 billion.
- 1984: Signing of the Sino-British Joint Declaration regarding the Handover of Hong Kong.
- 1989

- 15 April: Death of Hu Yaobang triggers student demonstrations.
- 3–4 June: The 1989 Tiananmen Square protests and massacre occur as the PLA clears the square.

== Jiang Zemin and Hu Jintao Eras (1990–2012) ==
- 1990: Re-establishment of the Shanghai Stock Exchange.
- 1992: Deng Xiaoping's Southern Tour reaffirms market reforms.
- 1994: Construction begins on the Three Gorges Dam.
- 1997

- February: Death of Deng Xiaoping.
- July: Handover of Hong Kong.

- 1999: Transfer of sovereignty over Macau from Portugal.
- 2001: China formally joins the World Trade Organization (WTO).
- 2003: SARS outbreak; launch of Shenzhou 5, China's first crewed spaceflight.
- 2008: 2008 Summer Olympics in Beijing; 2008 Sichuan earthquake in May.
- 2010: China surpasses Japan as the world's Second-largest economy.
- 2011: Sea trials begin for the aircraft carrier Liaoning.

== Xi Jinping Era (2012–present) ==
- 2012: Xi Jinping is elected General Secretary; launches an extensive anti-corruption campaign.
- 2013: The Belt and Road Initiative is announced.
- 2014

- September–December: The Umbrella Movement occurs in Hong Kong, seeking universal suffrage.

- 2015

- 11 June: Former security chief Zhou Yongkang is sentenced to life imprisonment for bribery and leaking state secrets.
- 7 November: The Ma–Xi meeting takes place in Singapore, the first meeting between leaders of both sides of the Taiwan Strait since 1949.

- 2016

- January: The "Two-child policy" officially takes effect.
- August: Chen Quanguo is appointed CPC Secretary of Xinjiang; the large-scale expansion of Xinjiang re-education camps begins, sparking global controversy.
- 15 September: The Tiangong-2 space station is launched.

- 2017

- 18–24 October: The 19th CPC National Congress is held. Xi Jinping is re-elected General Secretary.

- 2018: Constitutional amendments abolish presidential term limits.
- 2019

- June: Protests break out in Hong Kong against the extradition bill.
- December: The first cases of COVID-19 are identified in Wuhan.

- 2020

- 30 June: Implementation of the Hong Kong national security law.

- 2021: The CPC celebrates its 100th anniversary.
- 2022

- October: Xi Jinping is elected to a third term at the 20th National Congress of the Chinese Communist Party.
- November: The White Paper Protests occur against "Zero-COVID" policies.

- 2023

- March: At the first session of the 14th National People's Congress (NPC), Xi Jinping was re-elected as President of China, marking the first time since the founding of the PRC in 1949 that a head of state has entered a third term. This milestone occurred within the legal framework established by the 2018 constitutional amendment, which abolished presidential term limits. During the same session, Li Qiang was elected Premier of the State Council
- October: Li Keqiang, the former Premier of the State Council of China, passed away, triggering widespread mourning across the nation and the international community..

=== Recent Developments (2025–2026) ===
- 2025

- December: The PLA conducts "Mission Justice—2025" military exercises in the waters surrounding Taiwan.

- 2026

- 19 January: The Shenzhou 20 mission returns to Earth.
- 24 January: Reports emerge regarding disciplinary investigations into military leaders Zhang Youxia and Liu Zhenli.
- 9 February: Jimmy Lai is sentenced to 20 years in prison under the national security law.

== See also ==
- History of the People's Republic of China
- Timeline of Chinese history
