= Beijing Food Supply Department No. 34 =

Chinese state-owned company

- Native name: 北京市食品供应处34号供应部
- Company type: State-owned
- Industry: Food products
- Founded: 1956
- Headquarters: No. 140, Zhengwangfen, Fengtai District, Beijing, China, Beijing, China
- Area served: China
- Key people: Zhao Shixin (Director)
- Parent: Beijing Food Supply Co., Ltd.

Beijing Food Supply Department No. 34 Supply Department Co., Ltd. is a state-owned food supply company affiliated to Beijing Oriental Friendship Food Distribution Company, which is a subsidiary of Beijing Ershang Group. In addition to commercial operations, the company is also the main department of Beijing's special food supply system.

== History ==
The No. 34 Supply Department is part of the special supply system of the People's Republic of China and is the main working department of the Beijing special food supply system. Special supply is a food supply task that began at the beginning of the founding of the People's Republic of China. At first, it was to provide safe food guarantees for party and state leaders, foreign heads of state visits, and major state events such as state banquets when there was a general shortage of materials. It was a long-term political task. In the early days, special supply was mainly provided to three types of people: one was important national conferences and activities, the second was foreign heads of state and embassy personnel in China, and the third was special personnel such as central leaders, special workers and senior intellectuals.

In the early days of the founding of the People's Republic of China, in order to ensure the personal safety and health of the central leaders, the Ministry of Public Security of the Central People's Government established a special food supply station, namely the Zhongnanhai Special Needs Supply Station (known as the Beijing Hotel Guest House to the outside world), which was affiliated to the Fifth Division of the Eighth Bureau of the Ministry of Public Security (Food Security Division). The station was initially a department-level unit with one office and four sections. It was responsible for several production bases including the Jushan Farm, specializing in the production and processing of high-quality non-staple foods for the central leaders. Each production base was equipped with advanced equipment, and even the pig houses and cattle farms were designed and built by Soviet experts.

To ensure safety, the business cadres and staff of the Zhongnanhai Special Supply Station were selected by the Beijing Municipal Bureau of Commerce, and the security cadres and laboratory personnel were selected by the Beijing Municipal Public Security Bureau and appointed by the Eighth Bureau of the Ministry of Public Security. The origins and family backgrounds of these staff members were strictly examined, and they were politically reliable and ideologically strong. Their work was repeatedly commended by the central government, and nine special supply workers were successively received by Mao Zedong, Chairman of the Central Committee of the Chinese Communist Party.

On November 3, 1955, a report on the establishment of a non-staple food supply group was submitted to the leadership of the Beijing Municipal People's Committee. The report stated:

...At present, Beijing has problems in the supply of non-staple food to central leaders, foreign experts, embassies in Beijing, major hotels, and hospitals in terms of quantity, quality, timeliness, safety, supply standards, and prices...It is recommended to set up a special agency to implement strict planning management. Coordinate the supply of special non-staple food; formulate supply plans and special supply standards, and coordinate the solution of the food supply problems of foreign experts, foreign guests, major banquets, embassies in China, major hotels, special hospitals, and senior domestic leaders in the capital.

In December 1955, under the personal supervision of Beijing Mayor Peng Zhen, Beijing established a special supply leadership group consisting of nine people including Li Gongxia, deputy secretary-general of the Standing Committee of the Beijing Municipal People's Congress, and Peng Cheng. The special supply task was transferred from the Ministry of Public Security to the Beijing Municipal Committee of the Chinese Communist Party.

The special supply leading group clarified the scope of special supply and determined the business policy: Under the premise of ensuring absolute food safety, implement enterprise management and economic accounting system. It is not necessary to temporarily not turn over profits, but the quality of food must be guaranteed, and the price of goods must not be higher than the market price.

After the special supply task was transferred, it was initially handed over to the Beijing Third Commercial Bureau, and later to the Beijing Second Commercial Bureau (abbreviated as "Second Commercial Bureau", established in 1955). The Special Supply Leading Group initially established the Beijing Food Supply Office on the basis of the Special Supply Station of the Beijing Third Commercial Bureau and the Supply Department of the Beijing Hotel. As a specific working department, it also established the No. 34 Supply Department of the Beijing Food Supply Office, which became the core working department of Beijing's food special supply, and formed a relatively complete food special supply system around it.

No. 34 Supply Department was the first enterprise under the Beijing Food Supply Bureau. It was named "No. 34 Supply Department" because it was located at No. 34 Xila Hutong, Dongcheng District, Beijing. Since 1956, the Supply Department has been responsible for the food supply tasks for central leaders, foreign guests and important conferences. For example, the special supply for various major domestic and international events such as Nixon's visit to China in 1972 was undertaken by the Supply Department. Due to the continuous expansion of business volume, starting from 1973, the Supply Department built a new complex building on the original site, close to Dong'anmen Street. At the end of 1976, the Beijing Food Supply Bureau and No. 34 Supply Department moved to this site.

In 1993, the Second Commercial Bureau was approved by the State Council to be restructured into Beijing Food Industry and Trade Group Corporation. In 1997, it was restructured into the state-owned Beijing Second Commercial Group Co., Ltd. (Beijing Second Commercial Group) in accordance with the modern enterprise system and authorized by the Beijing Municipal People's Government. No. 34 Supply Department is affiliated to Beijing Oriental Friendship Food Distribution Company, a subsidiary of Beijing Second Commercial Group. Beijing Second Commercial Group has also become the main unit responsible for Beijing's special supply. Today, No. 34 Supply Department is located at No. 85, South Third Ring Road West, Yuquanying Street, Fengtai District, Beijing.

With the development of the market economy in the People's Republic of China, the No. 34 Supply Department, in addition to ensuring the special food supply mission, has gradually turned to commercial operations. The company's website once wrote:

In recent years, facing the tide of market economy, "No. 34" has strengthened the development and utilization of corporate brand resources while ensuring special supply. It has successively registered the "No. 34" graphic, digital and text trademarks, and launched its own brand products: Yuchun Wine, Longhui Dry Red Wine, Forbidden City Imperial Kitchen Wine, etc. At the same time, the introduction of computer information management system, the establishment of a modern food testing center, and the improvement of various infrastructures have improved the hardware level and management level of the enterprise, laying the foundation for No. 34 to develop into a modern enterprise. The supply department of No. 34 mainly deals in more than 1,600 varieties of national famous and high-quality tobacco and alcohol, sugar and tea, canned food, beverages, Chinese and Western food seasonings, poultry eggs, meat, aquatic products, grain and oil products and imported goods.
