= Wei Junxing =

Chinese politician

- 魏俊星

Mayor of Jinzhou
- In office January 2011 – November 2011
- Preceded by: Wang Wenquan
- Succeeded by: Liu Fenghai

Communist Party Secretary of Kaiyuan
- In office January 2001 – December 2010

Personal details
- Born: October 1955 (age 70–71) Heishan County, Liaoning, China
- Party: Chinese Communist Party
- Education: Liaoning Textile Industry College

Wei Junxing (Chinese: 魏俊星; pinyin: Weì Jùnxīng; born October 1955) is a former Chinese politician who spent most of his career in Liaoning province in northeast China. In January 2015, Wei was put under investigation by the Central Commission for Discipline Inspection. Previously he served as Deputy Secretary-general of Liaoning provincial government and the Chinese Communist Party Committee Secretary of Kaiyuan, and briefly as Mayor of Jinzhou.

== Life and career ==
Wei was born and raised in Heishan County, Liaoning. He graduated from Liaoning Textile Industry College (辽宁省纺织工业学校). Beginning in 1982, he served in several posts in Kaiyuan Textile Mill, where he was eventually promoted to plant manager and the Chinese Communist Party Committee Secretary of the mill.

He served as Vice Mayor of Kaiyuan from March 1997 to January 1999, and Communist Party Secretary, the top political position in the city, from January 2001 to December 2010, while also holding a seat on the Party Standing Committee of Tieling, the prefecture-level city of which Kaiyuan is under jurisdiction. Kaiyuan's national prominence grew significantly during Wei's term in office, mostly due to the fame of sketch comedy star Zhao Benshan, who is native to the area. Wei attended the premiere of the third installment of Xiangcun Aiqing ("Rural Love") produced by Zhao Benshan in December 2009. At the event, Wei showered Zhao with praise, saying, "Thank you to our dear Benshan, who has supported the development of Tieling and Kaiyuan in recent years. Tieling is now famous because it is known as the home of Zhao Benshan. Tieling will continue to provide the strongest support possible to Zhao Benshan and his artistic and life endeavours."

In December 2010, he was appointed Chinese Communist Party Deputy Committee Secretary and Vice Mayor of Jinzhou, and later Mayor of Jinzhou, he remained in that position until January 2011, when he was transferred to Shenyang, capital of Liaoning province, and appointed the Deputy Secretary-general of the Liaoning government.

On January 16, 2014, he has been put under investigation for alleged violations of discipline and law. His links to Zhao Benshan have been highlighted by Chinese-language media.

Government offices
Preceded by Wang Wenquan	Mayor of Jinzhou; 2011	Succeeded by Liu Fenghai
