= Reduction of One Million Troops =

1980s Chinese military policy

The Reduction of One Million Troops (Chinese: 百万大裁军; pinyin: Bǎiwàndà Cáijūn) was a military reform in China that led to the reduction of one million troops in the People's Liberation Army between mid-1985 and the end of 1987, under the leadership of Deng Xiaoping.

== Background ==
After the third plenary session of the 11th Central Committee of the Chinese Communist Party, Deng Xiaoping demanded that national defense and military construction should free up resources to support the development of the national economy and should be modernized and regularized. The Sino-Vietnamese War in the 1970s and 1980s also exposed the problems of the People's Liberation Army (PLA). Although the army obeyed the command of the Party, after ten years of the Cultural Revolution, factional struggles in the army seriously affected its combat effectiveness. After the Korean War, the People's Liberation Army experienced decades of peace, but the war against Vietnam exposed the serious weakening of the army's combat effectiveness. Issues such as the leadership, organization, combat training, officer-to-soldier ratio, age and quality requirements of cadres of the Chinese army have all become reform contents to be considered by the Central Military Commission (CMC). After the 1980s, the PLA carried out a series of reforms.

In 1982, the various technical branches of the CMC were reduced and merged into the branches of the General Staff Department of the People's Liberation Army, and the Railway Corps was transferred to the Ministry of Railways. While a large number of command organs were eliminated, electronic countermeasures forces were added and the Commission for Science, Technology and Industry for National Defense was established to meet the needs of national defense modernization. In April 1983, the People's Armed Police was established. On 1 November 1984, a symposium of the Central Military Commission was held in Beijing. Deng Xiaoping, Chairman of the Central Military Commission, delivered a speech of nearly 90 minutes, proposing to further reduce the number of personnel by 1 million on the basis of several reorganizations of the army. This decision reflected the determination of the CCP Central Committee after judging the international and domestic political and economic situation. After the symposium, the Central Military Commission studied the reorganization plan of reducing personnel by 1 million based on the spirit of Deng Xiaoping's speech, determined to reform the system and organization, adjust the composition ratio, reduce cadres and support personnel, and eliminate outdated equipment.

From 23 May to 6 June 1985, the Central Military Commission held an enlarged meeting in Beijing. The main contents of the meeting, in addition to adjusting and selecting the leadership teams of the major military regions and making the military cadres younger, were to implement the task of reducing the number of military personnel by 1 million by the CCP Central Committee and the State Council, and to carry out streamlining, reorganization and system reform of the military. On 4 June 1985, Deng Xiaoping announced at the enlarged meeting of the Central Military Commission: "The number of personnel of the Chinese People's Liberation Army will be reduced by one million".

== Rationale ==
Deng Xiaoping proposed reducing the army by 1 million for two main reasons. First, the People's Liberation Army was bloated, with each military region having a leadership team of more than ten or twenty people, and the structure was unreasonable, with an officer-to-soldier ratio of 1:2.6, which was far higher than that of other countries. At that time, China's military expenditure was very low, while the number of troops was too large, which directly restricted the development of the army's weapons and equipment and the improvement of its combat effectiveness. Reducing the army could save expenses, improve equipment, and improve the quality of the army. Another reason for reducing the army was based on the judgment of the international situation that there would be no major war in the short term, so more money should be freed up for construction, and "even if war breaks out, we must reduce the size of the army".

== The troop reduction ==
According to the decision and deployment of the Central Military Commission, starting from the second half of 1985, the People's Liberation Army organized and implemented a massive reduction of one million troops from top to bottom, following the order of first the organs, then the troops, academies and support units. By 1987, the total number of personnel of the Chinese People's Liberation Army had been reduced from 4.238 million to 3.235 million. After that, further reductions were made, and by 1990, the total number of personnel of the entire army had been reduced to 3.199 million, a total reduction of 1.039 million.

In this disarmament operation, the original 11 military regions were streamlined and merged into 7, and the Wuhan, Kunming, Fuzhou and Xinjiang military regions were merged. 31 units above the army level were reduced, 4,050 division and regiment level units were abolished, and county and city people's armed forces departments were transferred to local administration. A large number of military leaders did not hold positions in the newly merged military regions, but were dismissed or retired on the spot. The People's Liberation Army also established the People's Liberation Army Army Group and Army Aviation Corps, and increased the proportion of technical branches, marking the beginning of a major strategic structural adjustment of the Chinese army.

== Analysis ==
Yuan Houchun believes that the reduction of one million troops is an important milestone in the reform and opening up. Yuan Houchun believes that reducing the number of troops and streamlining and reorganizing can better concentrate human and financial resources for modernization. The "head expenses" saved by reducing the number of troops can be used to update equipment and strengthen the army's scientific and technological strength, thereby achieving the goal of improving the combat effectiveness of the troops and enabling the army to move towards modernization and regularization. The competition between economy and technology is the most important contest in the world today.
