= Wu Han (historian) =

Chinese historian and politician

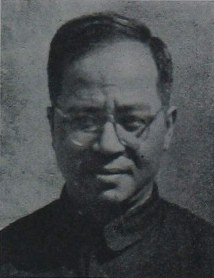
- Born: 11 August 1909; Yiwu, Zhejiang, China
- Died: 11 October 1969 (aged 60)
- Education: Tsinghua University
- Notable work: Hai Rui Dismissed from Office
- Political party: China Democratic League; Chinese Communist Party
- Spouse: Yuan Zhen (d. 18 March 1969)
- Children: 2; including Wu Xiaoyan

Wu Han (Chinese: 吴晗; pinyin: Wú Hán; August 11, 1909 – October 11, 1969) was a Chinese historian and politician. Wu was one of the most important historians in the development of modern historical scholarship in China during the 1930s and 1940s.

In the 1940s he was a leading member of the China Democratic League, a non-aligned political organization during most of the Chinese Civil War which eventually threw its weight behind the Chinese Communist Party. After 1949, he served as the Vice Mayor of Beijing.

In November 1965, at the beginning of the Cultural Revolution, he came under attack for a play he wrote about an upright Ming dynasty official called Hai Rui Dismissed from Office, which was widely understood as an anti-Mao allegory. His political downfall also resulted in the purge of Beijing Mayor Peng Zhen. Wu died in prison in 1969.

== Biography ==
=== Early life and education ===
Wu Han was born in Yiwu, Zhejiang in 1909. With support from the Wu clan organization and with the money from selling his mother's jewelry, he attended university preparatory schools in Hangzhou and then in Shanghai, where he was inspired by the lectures of Hu Shih. He entered Tsinghua University in 1931 and came under the influence of Tsiang Tingfu. Since he was responsible for the support of his brother and sister, he was unable to go abroad for study. Wu stayed at Tsinghua as a teaching assistant but began to publish important articles on Ming dynasty history using critical techniques to resolve old controversies and raise new questions.

=== 1937–1953 ===
When the war with Japan broke out in 1937, Wu joined National Southwestern Associated University in Kunming. While there, he wrote a full scale biography of the founder of the Ming dynasty, Zhu Yuanzhang, published in 1943, expanded and revised in 1947. He became a leading intellectual in the democratic movement of the 1940s, as well as a widely published essayist. Through his part in the China Democratic League he was enlisted in the founding of the People's Republic in 1949.

When the new United Front was founded, as a member of the Democratic League, Wu was asked to take the position of Vice Mayor of Beijing in charge of education and cultural affairs for the 6 county municipal area that became a model for municipalities across the PRC. In the 1950s, Wu represented China abroad on cultural tours and popularized his research at home, using figures from history as models and allegorical figures. He became a member of the Chinese Communist Party secretly in 1957; this was not known by his colleagues or by Party members except at the very highest level. It was only revealed in the Cultural Revolution by the Red Guard accusations after they found his files.

As a historian, Wu was a pioneering researcher into the Ming dynasty. The topic had been taboo under the Qing dynasty.

=== Later years ===
In 1956, Wu Han and Yuan Zhen adopted Wu Xiaoyan. In 1958, the two adopted Wu Zhang.

Several years before the controversy and political dispute raised by Hai Rui Dismissed from Office, Wu Han and two of Wu's associates, Deng Tuo, the former editor of the People's Daily, and novelist Liao Mosha who wrote a series of articles called The Village of the Three Families (三家村札记) which satirized the political experiments of the Great Leap Forward.

In 1961, Wu defended traditional plays which included supernatural plot elements (supernatural elements in cultural forms were then being politically criticized, including by Jiang Qing). Writing in China Youth, Wu contended that traditional plays with supernatural elements should not be construed as spreading superstition.

Yang Jisheng wrote in his history of the Cultural Revolution:

As a leading Ming historian within the party, Wu Han used Marxism to interpret history and used history as a politically charged allusion to the present. Prior to the establishment of the PRC, Wu Han's works had castigated the founding Ming emperor, Zhu Yuanzhang, as a stand-in for Chiang Kai-shek, but after the PRC was established, Wu's book Zhu Yuanzhang served as a paean of praise to Mao Zedong. This double standard is typical of intellectuals who rise to fame under a totalitarian government.

Yang writes that Mao had encouraged Wu Han to write the essay "Hai Rui Dismissed from Office," published under Wu's pen name in the People's Daily in June 1959, which was based on events in the life of a Ming dynasty official. Wu subsequently turned the essay, after multiple revisions, into the Beijing opera Hai Rui Dismissed from Office, which was performed in 1961 to great acclaim. Subsequently, "...the hypervigilant Jiang Qing and Kang Sheng decided [it] was ... 'related to the Lushan Conference and ... implicitly endorsed 'assigning output quotas to households' and the ongoing verdict-reversal wind. Mao took their views seriously and instructed Jiang Qing to find a hit man to denounce the play."

The subsequent attacks on the play and Wu Han were actually aimed at the mayor of Beijing, Peng Zhen, an ally of President Liu Shaoqi and a pillar of the Chinese Communist Party ("CCP") establishment that Mao wanted to take down. This process took time but eventually resulted in launch of the ten-year struggle between Mao and the CCP bureaucracy known as the Cultural Revolution.

The leftist literary critic Yao Wenyuan, later appointed to the Politburo of the Central Committee of the Chinese Communist Party and who became known as one of the Gang of Four, fired one of the opening shots in this struggle on November 10, 1965, when he published an article in Wenhui Bao attacking Wu and his play on the grounds that Hai Rui was metaphorically equated with Marshal Peng Dehuai, who had criticized Mao for launching the Great Leap Forward and who had been purged as a result. Yao Wenyuan argued that therefore Wu Han had equated Mao himself with the un-approachable Ming emperor who dismissed the righteous Hai Rui from office. Yao also attacked Deng Tuo and Liao Mosha.

Under intense pressure, Wu admitted ideological mistakes but denied that his motives were counter-revolutionary. Wu was deemed by Mao as an "anti-Party element" and was formally condemned, stripped of his positions and subjected to intense persecution during the Cultural Revolution.

Over the next few months, the controversy grew, eventually implicating Peng Zhen, who was purged alongside the entire Beijing Municipal Committee. Deng Tuo and Liao Mosha were purged as well.

Although there were reports that Wu Han committed suicide while in prison in 1969, fellow prisoners later reported that he was beaten in prison about a year before he died. It is also thought his tuberculosis may have recurred so it cannot be established how he died.

== See also ==
- Chen Boda
- Wu Xiaoyan, Wu's adopted daughter

== Sources ==
- Mary G. Mazur (2009). Wu Han, Historian: Son of China's Times. Lanham: Lexington Books, 2009. ISBN 978-0-7391-2456-7. Review, Diana Lin, H-Asia (May 2010)
- Mary G. Mazur (1993), "Intellectual Activism in China During the 1940s: Wu Han in the United Front and the Democratic League," The China Quarterly 133 (1993): 27–55.
- Jonathan D. Spence (1990), The Search for Modern China (New York: Norton 1990).
- William Safire (1978), Safire's Political Dictionary, 1978, Random House. "Cultural Revolution," pp. 153–4.
- Clive Ansley (1971). The Heresy of Wu Han: His Play "Hai Rui's Dismissal" and its Role in China's Cultural Revolution.Toronto: University of Toronto Press. ISBN 9781487596408
- “Wu Han” (1970), Howard L. Boorman, Richard C. Howard, eds. Biographical Dictionary of Republican China Vol 3 (New York,: Columbia University Press, 1970): 425–430.
- MacFarquhar, Roderick (1974). Contradictions Among the People 1956–1957. The Origins of the Cultural Revolution. Vol. 1. London: Oxford University Press. pp. 158, 271–272, 276–278, 394, 396. hdl:2027/heb02389.0001.001. ISBN 9780192149954.
