= Wu Xiaoyan =

Victim of Cultural Revolution (1954–1976)

- 吴小彦
- Born: 1954
- Died: 23 September 1976 (aged 21–22); Beijing, China
- Cause of death: Suicide by poison
- Known for: Victim of the Cultural Revolution
- Parents: Wu Han (adoptive father); Yuan Zhen (adoptive mother)

Wu Xiaoyan (Chinese: 吴小彦, 1954 – 23 September 1976) was a victim of the Cultural Revolution. Wu's adoptive parents, Yuan Zhen and Wu Han, died separately under persecution in 1969, leaving her with her younger brother Wu Zhang. Wu's mental state deteriorated in the early 1970s. She was imprisoned in 1975 and committed suicide by poison in 1976.

== Biography ==
=== Early life (1954–1968) ===
Wu Xiaoyan was born in 1954. She was adopted by Wu Han and Yuan Zhen because of Yuan's infertility. Kang Keqing helped with the adoption process. Wu and Yuan later adopted a boy in 1958 and named him Wu Zhang (Chinese: 吴彰).

On 11 November 1965, Yao Wenyuan published an article "On the New Historical Beijing Opera 'Hai Rui Dismissed from Office'" on Wenhui Bao, attacking Wu Han's opera play. Since 16 May 1966, Wu Han began to undergo struggle sessions. In March 1968, Wu Han was imprisoned. A month later in April, Yuan Zhen was also detained into an "educational class" (Chinese: 学习班), leaving the 14-year-old Wu Xiaoyan with her 10-year-old brother. During Yuan's detention, Wu Xiaoyan travelled tens of Chinese miles by bicycle every day to visit her adoptive mother.

=== Death of adoptive parents (1969) ===
On 17 March 1969, Yuan was released, but she fell ill later at night. Wu Xiaoyan and her brother took Yuan to the hospital, but the hospital first denied her care because Yuan was the wife of Wu Han. Although the hospital eventually agreed to perform emergency care, Yuan died the next morning. Because of her adoptive mother's death, Wu Xiaoyan began to develop hallucinations. Wu's adoptive father, Wu Han, died on 10 October in the same year. Wu Xiaoyan and her brother were taken to the hospital. They did not see their adoptive father's corpse, but they were given a bloodied pair of pants and several cigarettes, which were the only personal belongings of Wu Han.

The remains of Wu Han was lost, and only the ashes of Yuan Zhen was given to the Wu family. In November 1969, Wu Xiaoyan took the ashes of her adoptive mother and went to Badachu at the Western Hills of Beijing with her brother and two other friends. They buried Yuan's ashes on the hillside, beneath a boulder with the character "Fo" (Chinese: 佛; lit. 'Buddha') engraved on it.

=== Final years (1973–1976) ===
Wan Li arranged a job for Wu Xiaoyan, and she supported her brother through her wages. However, in 1973, Wu became mentally ill. She would claim to see her dead father on the newspaper. She then visited the Beijing Revolutionary Committee for many times, seeking the remains, the personal books, and the verdict of her father. She was soon detained under the charge of "disturbing social order". During her detainment, she was humiliated and beaten. Eventually, she developed mental disorder and was sent into a psychiatric hospital.

In autumn 1975, during the Counterattack the Right-Deviationist Reversal-of-Verdicts Trend, (Note: Chinese: 反右倾翻案风; lit. 'to beat back the Right-deviating verdict-reversal wind'.) Wu was imprisoned because she discussed the Gang of Four with her friends. She developed appendicitis, but she was denied surgery. Instead, she underwent forced confession and lost her incisor teeth. She was eventually admitted to a psychiatric hospital again.

In her final days, Wu said to her brother that she would commit suicide when he became an adult. On 23 September 1976, the day her brother turned eighteen, Wu committed suicide by poison in a psychiatric hospital. Her death was thirteen days before the destruction of the Gang of Four.

== Legacy ==
In the late 1970s, Li Zhilin, a former boyfriend of Wu, wrote Memories of Wu Xiaoyan.
