= Seven Thousand Cadres Conference =

1962 Chinese Communist Party meeting

The Seven-Thousand Cadres Conference (Chinese: 七千人大会; pinyin: Qīqiān rén dàhuì; Wade–Giles: Ch'i^{1}-ch'ien^{1} jen^{2} ta^{4}-hui^{4}) was one of the largest work conferences ever of the Chinese Communist Party (CCP). It took place in Beijing, China, from 11 January to 7 February 1962. The conference was attended by over 7,000 party officials nationwide, focusing on the issues of the Great Leap Forward which resulted in the deaths of tens of millions in the Great Chinese Famine. CCP chairman Mao Zedong made a self-criticism during the conference, after which he took a semi-retired role until the Cultural Revolution, leaving economic and party responsibilities to Chinese President Liu Shaoqi and Vice Premier Deng Xiaoping.

== Conference ==
The Conference took place in Beijing, China, from 11 January to 7 February 1962.

During the conference, Liu Shaoqi, the 2nd President of China and Vice Chairman of the Communist Party, delivered an important speech that formally attributed 30% of the famine to natural disasters and 70% to man-made mistakes, which were mainly the radical economic policies of the Great Leap Forward since 1958.

The policies of Mao Zedong were criticized, and Mao also made self-criticism as the conference promoted "criticism and self-criticism".

CCP vice chairman Lin Biao, however, continued his praises of Mao at the conference. Lin's speech described Mao Zedong Thought as the guiding light for the future. It did not address any of the failures of the Great Leap Forward.

The conference promoted democratic centralism within the Communist Party.

== Influence ==
After the 7,000 Cadres Conference, Liu Shaoqi together with Deng Xiaoping, was in charge of most policies within the party and the government, while Mao oversaw the party and remained as its leader. Yet, this power dynamic was upended by the Cultural Revolution in which Mao increasingly eroded at the power of Deng and Liu as well as other reformists in the party, allowing for the rise of the Gang of Four.

The conference corrected some of the far-left economic policies. Economic reforms such as sanzi yibao (三自一包) which allowed free market and household responsibility for agricultural production were carried out by Liu Shaoqi, Deng Zihui and others. The reforms alleviated the economic difficulties after the Great Leap Forward to an extent.

== Aftermath ==
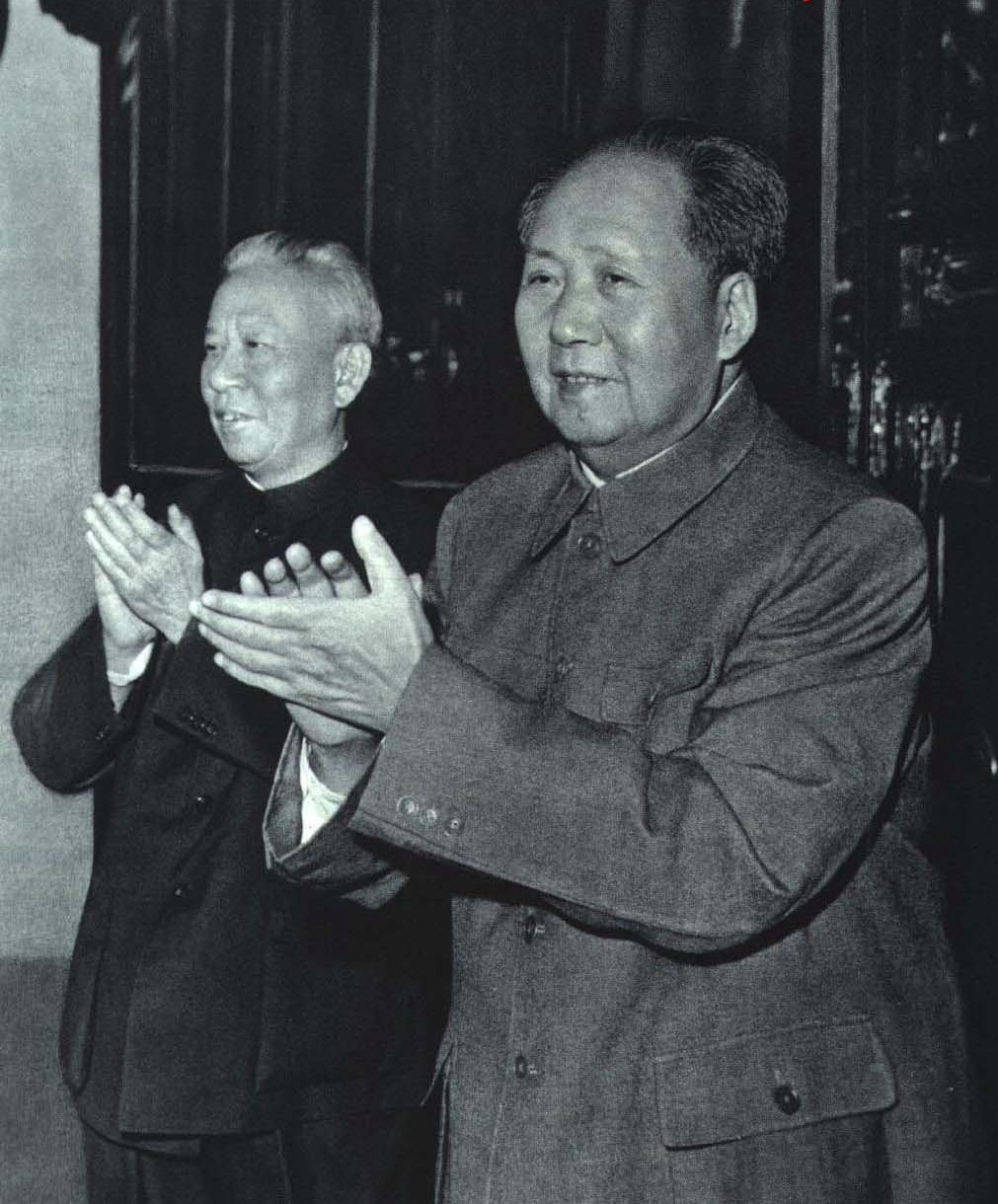
President Liu Shaoqi and Chairman Mao Zedong (1964)

The conference revealed serious divisions within the party's top leadership between those who thoroughly endorsed the Three Red Banners and those who maintained doubts about them.

The disagreement between Mao and Liu (and Deng) became more and more apparent, especially on Mao's call to "never forget class struggle".

In August 1962, Mao emphasized during a meeting in Beidaihe that class struggle must be talked about "every year, every month and every day (年年讲, 月月讲, 日日讲)". Mao reinforced his point of view in September 1962 during the 10th Plenary Session of the 8th Central Committee of the Chinese Communist Party.

Mao also criticized the economic reforms carried out by Liu Shaoqi and others, even describing the reforms to foreign leaders as "attempts to undermine socialist collectivism and destroy socialism" in February 1964.

In 1963, Mao launched the nationwide Socialist Education Movement and in 1966, he launched the Cultural Revolution in order to return to the center of power, during which Liu was persecuted to death as a "traitor" as well as a "capitalist roader" and Deng was also purged (twice).

Lin Biao, on the other hand, was formally selected by Mao as his successor in 1969.

== See also ==
- Great Leap Forward
- Sino-Soviet Split
- Lushan Conference
- Great Chinese Famine
- Three Freedoms and One Guarantee
- Socialist Education Movement
- Cultural Revolution
- Cadre system of the Chinese Communist Party
