= Anti-Right Deviation Struggle =

Chinese political campaign launched in 1959

The Anti-Right Deviation Struggle (simplified Chinese: 反右倾斗争; traditional Chinese: 反右傾鬥爭), also known as the Anti-Right Deviation Campaign (simplified Chinese: 反右倾运动; traditional Chinese: 反右傾運動), was a political campaign launched by Mao Zedong in 1959 after the Lushan Conference, aiming at purging the "right-deviationists" or "right-opportunists" within the Chinese Communist Party (CCP). The struggle started with the purge of Marshal Peng Dehuai, then Minister of National Defense, who expressed disagreement with Mao over the radical policies of the Great Leap Forward. In total, over 3 million CCP members were purged or penalized during the campaign. In the early 1980s, the purge of Peng Dehuai was categorized as "entirely wrong" by CCP during the Boluan Fanzheng period.

== History ==
In 1957, the Chinese Communist Party (CCP) under Mao Zedong launched the Anti-Rightist Campaign in mainland China, mainly targeting critics and intellectuals outside the CCP. According to official published data, more than 550,000 people were persecuted during this campaign.

In 1958, Mao launched the Great Leap Forward as well as the people's commune, but soon met criticisms within the CCP, notably from Marshal Peng Dehuai and his supporters. During the Lushan Conference in July 1959, Peng submitted a letter of opinion to Mao, expressing concerns and disagreement over the radical policies of the Great Leap Forward. As a result, Peng and his supporters including Huang Kecheng, Zhang Wentian and Zhou Xiaozhou were labelled as "anti-Party clique" and were subsequently purged. Peng was persecuted to death later during the Cultural Revolution (1966–1976).

Immediately after the Lushan Conference, Mao launched the "Anti-Right Deviation Struggle" at the Eighth Plenary Session of the Eighth CCP Central Committee in August 1959. Mao insisted that "Right opportunism is the main danger right now." According to him, the Lushan Conference revealed the existence of a large group of rightists who were vulnerable to Western influence. As a result, more than 3 million CCP members were labelled as right-deviationists or right-opportunists (1962 official data), and were subsequently purged or penalized.

== Aftermath ==
The Great Leap Forward contributed to the Great Chinese Famine (1959–1961), which caused the deaths of tens of millions of people in mainland China. In the official Resolution on Certain Questions in the History of Our Party since the Founding of the People's Republic of China passed in 1981, the CCP called the purge of the so-called anti-Party group of Peng Dehuai and others as "entirely wrong" and cut short the process of the rectification of "Left" errors. The 1981 Resolution also states that "It was mainly due to the errors of the Great Leap Forward and of the struggle against 'Right opportunism' together with a succession of natural calamities and the perfidious scrapping of contracts by the Soviet Government that our economy encountered serious difficulties between 1959 and 1961, which caused serious losses to our country and people."

== See also ==
- Anti-Rightist Campaign
- Great Leap Forward
- Great Chinese Famine
- Lushan Conference
- Seven Thousand Cadres Conference
- Counterattack the Right-Deviationist Reversal-of-Verdicts Trend
- List of campaigns of the Chinese Communist Party
