= Lushan Conference =

1959 meetings of the Politburo and Central Committee of the Chinese Communist Party

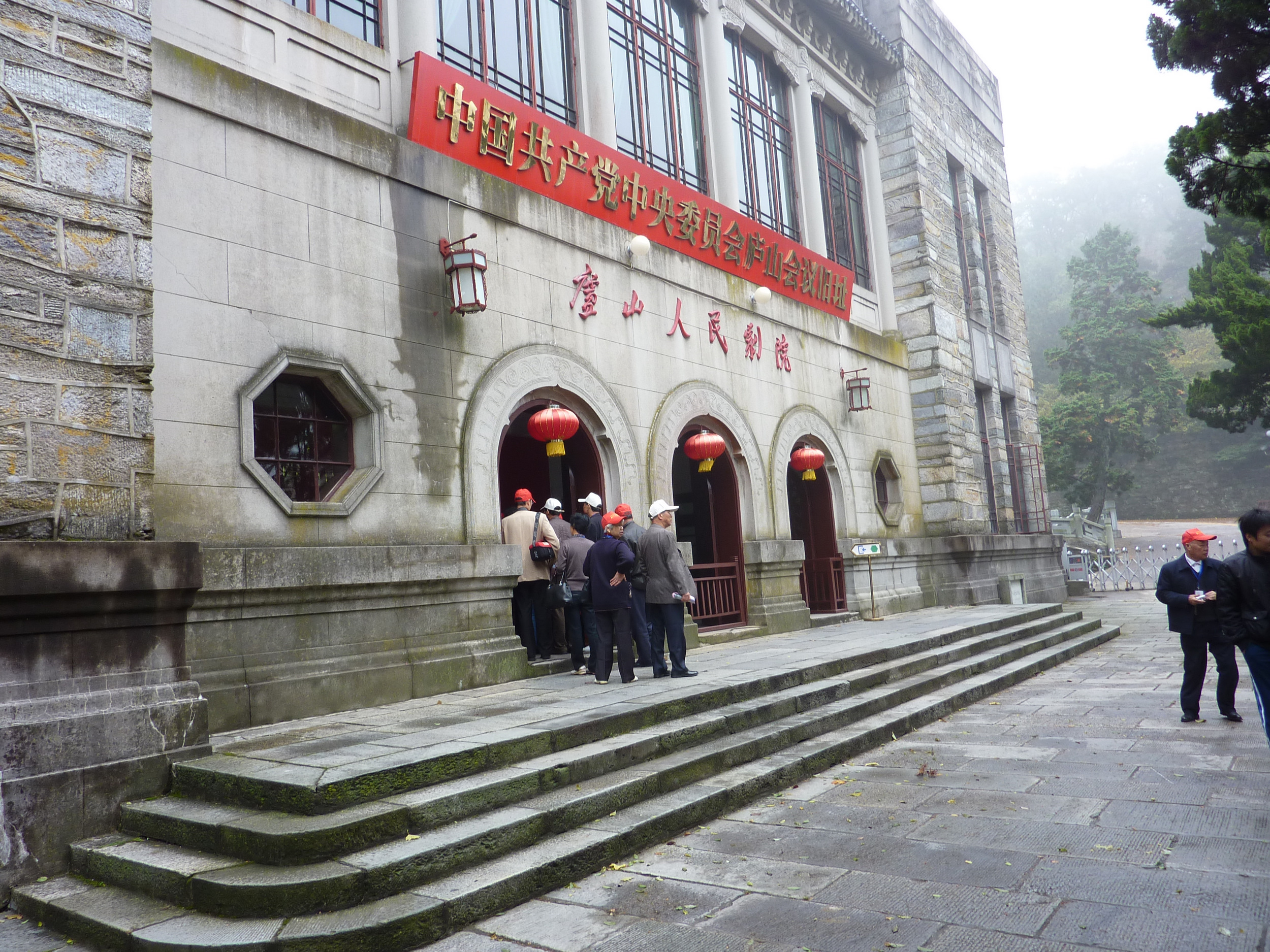
- Site of the Lushan Conference
- Traditional Chinese: 廬山會議
- Simplified Chinese: 庐山会议
Transcriptions
Standard Mandarin
- Hanyu Pinyin: Lúshān Huìyì

The Lushan Conference was a meeting of the top leaders of the Chinese Communist Party (CCP) held between July and August 1959. The CCP Politburo met in an "expanded session" (Kuoda Huiyi) between July 2 and August 1, followed by the 8th Plenum of the 8th Central Committee of the CCP from August 2–16. The major topic of discussion was the Great Leap Forward.

The Lushan Conference saw the political purge of the Defense Minister, Marshal Peng Dehuai, whose criticism of some aspects of the Great Leap Forward was seen as an attack on the political line of CCP chairman Mao Zedong, resulting in a massive "Anti-Right Deviation Struggle" within the CCP. The Lushan Conference also marked the first time since the founding of the People's Republic of China (PRC) in 1949 that disagreement over the direction of policy spilled into open conflict between party leaders.

The conference's name is derived from the meeting place, a resort on Mount Lu in Jiujiang, China.

== The conference ==
The original objective of the conference was to review the events of the Great Leap Forward and solve practical issues brought forth by those events. When the Lushan Conference officially began, the communist leadership was divided on questions of how the crisis had come to develop and what the response going forward should be. Mao was critical of his own role in the failures of the Great Leap Forward. He described the backyard steel campaign he had promoted as a "great catastrophe" and criticized himself for pushing communization so fast. In a July speech before the Lushan Conference, Mao stated, "The chaos caused was on a grand level and I take responsibility for it." Mao also defended the policies of the Great Leap Forward in general and communes in particular.

A major specific focus of the Lushan Conference was the distortion created by false production reports. During the Great Leap Forward, lower bureaucratic levels were asked to fulfill unrealistic production quotas. Ignoring the actual conditions at even lower levels, officials frequently claimed that the production goals had been achieved. These behaviors were prompted by higher-level officials who overly emphasized production and addressed the peasants as "rural Stakhanovites." The ensuing false statistics impeded central coordination of the economy. At Mount Lu, addressing these issues implicated a broader political tension over centralization and decentralization. As academic Alessandro Russo writes, the party's former strength of coordinating peasant political power had now created a major obstacle.

Mao Zedong also intended to use the conference to contain the "leftist tendency" elements in the Great Leap Forward.

== Peng Dehuai's complaints ==
In Spring 1959, PRC Defense Minister Peng Dehuai led a Chinese military delegation on a visit to Eastern Europe and the Soviet Union. Peng expressed his displeasure with the Great Leap Forward to various communist leaders, including Nikita Khrushchev. In his view, the socioeconomic policies of the period undermined the economic development necessary to modernize the army. On his return to China in mid-June, Peng began to publicly criticize the Great Leap Forward.

Peng had originally intended to skip the meeting, but at Mao's urging, he decided to speak up at Lushan. During the group discussions, he declared that "everyone was responsible for the mistakes committed during the Great Leap, including Chairman Mao." Peng's criticism culminated in his "Letter of Opinion", having resolved to take his concerns to Mao himself. On July 14, Peng wrote a private letter to Mao criticizing some elements of the Great Leap Forward. In the letter, he cautiously framed his words and did not deny the "great achievement" of Mao, but meanwhile showed his disapproval for elements like the "winds of exaggeration" (i.e., over-reporting of grain production), the backyard furnaces used to make unqualified steel and also the establishment of commune militia, which he felt would undermine the strength of the People's Liberation Army. He expressed his "confusion" towards "rather large losses" and the "epidemic of bragging" in the Great Leap Forward. Peng attributed the problems to "petty bourgeois fanaticism" and linked the errors personally to Mao.

For this reason, Mao extended the conference for more than ten days.

== Downfall of Peng Dehuai ==
"Peng, Huang, Zhang, Zhou Right-Opportunist Anti-Party Clique"

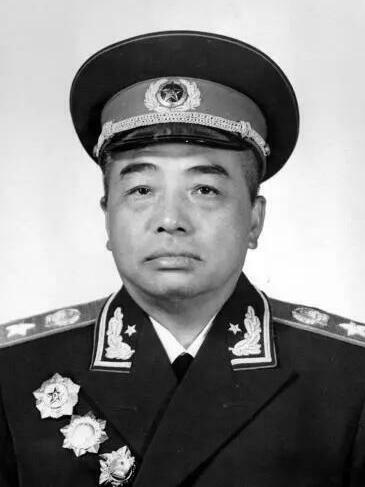
Peng Dehuai

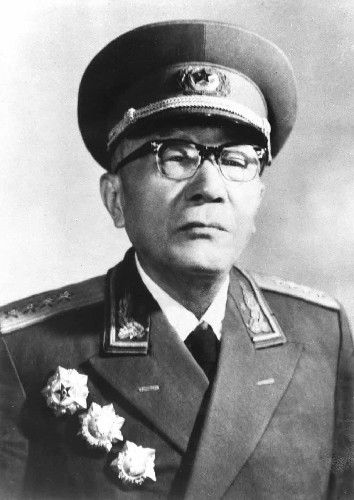
Huang Kecheng

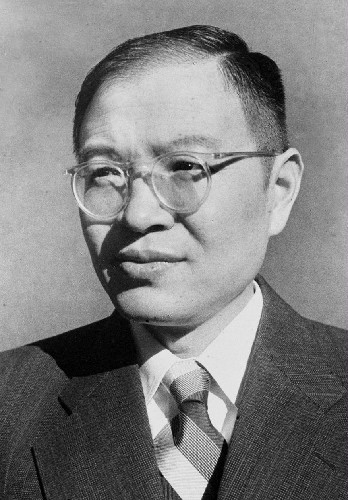
Zhang Wentian

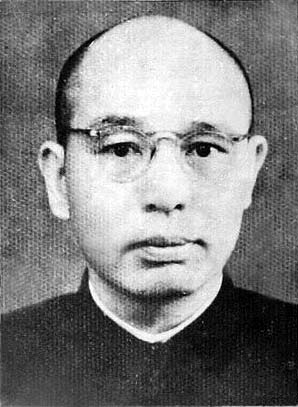
Zhou Xiaozhou

On July 17, Mao publicly showed Peng's private letter to his comrades and asked them to express their views on the issue. Peng made no further substantive argument other than for the party to immediately withdraw from political initiatives in rural areas. Peng's position found no support among other conference attendees, as it amounted to "political suicide" for the party. For example, Zhou Enlai, normally a mediator between the left and right sides of the party, was extremely critical of Peng. Additionally, Peng's position would mean de facto realignment with Soviet approaches at a time when Mao had been trying to find an independent path in terms of both foreign and domestic policy approaches.

By the time of the Plenum, which immediately followed the Lushan Conference, Peng had become politically isolated and stripped from his position as Defence Minister. The Lushan Plenum adopted a resolution denouncing "the anti-Party clique headed by Peng Duhai."

In contrast to Peng, Mao's position was that peasant enthusiasm was positive because political development required mass momentum. Mao continued to believe that the experiment of giving the peasantry a political role should be continued. His view was that initiatives like self-organizing agricultural tasks, self-managed schools, and cooperative medical services should continue wherever possible. Mao nonetheless agreed that specific objectives had to be made more realistic and that the absurd bureaucratic boasting regarding production quotas had to be stopped.

Mao bitterly criticised Peng for constituting an error in the political line, for being part of a group that wavered in the face of difficulties and who were "only 30 kilometres away from the rightists". Mao also stated that if there were nothing but criticism, communism would collapse and then threatened that if it occurred, he would "go to the countryside, lead the peasants and overthrow the government again." Mao also announced in August that the conflict at the conference is a class struggle and that the conflict "is the continuation of the life-or-death struggle between the two great antagonists of the bourgeoisie and the proletariat in the process of the socialist revolution during the past decade." Peng was subsequently dismissed and arrested. In September 1959, he was replaced by Lin Biao. As indicated by Mao in a September 1959 speech, Mao believed that Peng and others had gone "behind the back of our fatherland to collude with a foreign country."

Although the criticism of Peng Dehuai resulted in a victory for Mao Zedong, it also led the leadership to conclude that he had been treated unfairly and that the party's norms had been violated.

Zhou Xiaozhou, along with Huang Kecheng and Zhang Wentian, who lent their support to Peng Dehuai in questioning the wisdom of the Great Leap Forward, were also branded as traitors, stripped of their positions, and sent to re-education through labour. Li Rui, one of Mao's private secretaries, was also stripped of party membership and sent to a labor camp for refusing to denounce Peng.

== Consequences of the conference ==
Immediately after the Lushan Conference, Mao launched the Anti-Right Deviation Struggle at the Eighth Plenary Session of the Eighth CCP Central Committee in August 1959, aiming at purging the "right-deviationists" or "right-opportunists" within the CCP. According to Mao, the Lushan Conference disclosed the existence of a huge group of "rightists" who were vulnerable to Western influence. In total, over 3 million CCP members were purged or penalized during the campaign.

After the Lushan Conference, Mao intensified efforts to diverge China's approach to economic development from the Soviet model. Between December 1959 and February 1960, he read Joseph Stalin's Economic Problems of Socialism in the USSR and a Soviet text on political economy and criticized the Soviet approach in discussions with scholars.

Not long after the Lushan Conference, Mao removed himself from the day-to-day workings of the party. Historian Maurice Meisner contends that Mao must have understood that Peng's criticisms were widely shared by the Party leadership and that Mao could not command sufficient support from the Central Committee to continue the radical policies of the Great Leap Forward, had he been so inclined.

Mao himself summarized the Lushan Conference in the Seven Thousand Cadres Conference after the disasters of the Great Leap Forward, as he self-criticized and argued the Lushan Conference should be focused on the works; however, "then up jumped Peng and said 'you fucked my mother for forty days, can I fuck your mother for twenty days?'", and the conference became a mess. (Note: Mao was replying to an earlier remark about Peng, in which Peng had referred to criticisms to which he was subjected to for 40 days with regards to the Hundred Regiments Offensive before the Seventh National Congress in 1945)

== See also ==
- Great Leap Forward
- The Second Plenum of the 9th Central Committee of the Chinese Communist Party, held in 1970. Because this conference was also held in Mount Lu, it is sometimes also referred to as the "Second Lushan Conference".
- Seven Thousand Cadres Conference
