= Capitalist roader =

Maoist term for return to capitalism

In Maoism, a capitalist roader (Note: simplified Chinese: 走资派; traditional Chinese: 走資派; pinyin: Zǒuzīpài also simplified Chinese: 走资本主义道路的当权派; traditional Chinese: 走資本主義道路的當權派; pinyin: Zǒu zīběnzhǔyì dàolù de dāngquánpài) is a person or group who demonstrates a marked tendency to bow to pressure from bourgeois forces and subsequently attempts to pull the Chinese Communist Revolution in a capitalist direction. If allowed to do so, these forces would eventually restore the political and economic rule of capitalism; in other words, these forces would lead a society down a "capitalist road".

== History ==
The term first appeared in Chinese Communist Party (CCP) literature in 1965; however, the term within Maoist thinking can be traced back to the Hungarian Revolution of 1956. Whilst the Hungarian Revolution was taking place, Mao Zedong saw "Soviet autocratic rule" in the Eastern Bloc as improper and no longer representing the needs of the Hungarian people. Mao was critical of the Soviet Union's presence and intervention in Hungary, a standpoint that would eventually lead to the Sino-Soviet split. He believed that Hungarian Socialist Workers Party members divorced their leadership from the people, which therefore allowed for economic revision back to capitalism.

Mao used this example in his 1956 meeting with the CCP Politburo to adjust internal mechanisms to tighten power restrictions within the party in favor of not divorcing the party from their people's communism. This meeting took place during the Hundred Flowers Campaign where Mao invited criticism of the CCP from civilians and intellectuals. The feedback received was critical of Mao and CCP members. Liu Binyan, a party cadre of Mao, argued that people who were critical of the CCP should be shortlisted as enemies of the CCP. Additionally, Binyan argued that members of the CCP who were critical of the CCP were 'capitalist roaders' that destroyed the internal mechanisms of the party.

During the Cultural Revolution, Mao proclaimed that greater effort must be focused on CCP members who follow the capitalist road. Mao described roaders as "ambitionists, conspirators, and hypocrites of the exploiting class". He asked the public to coordinate criticism of local CCP members who seemed to be capitalist roaders. Capitalist roaders were accused of "favoring a pragmatic economic policy that would offer material incentives for works and peasants, rely on experts," and "borrow technology for China's factories and military from abroad".

== Usage in critique of Deng Xiaoping ==
Mao contended that Deng Xiaoping, who was a lifelong CCP member and was committed to the party's approach since he was a young boy, was a capitalist roader and that the Soviet Union fell to capitalist roaders from within the Communist Party of the Soviet Union after the death of Joseph Stalin in 1953. Later in 1966, Mao attacked Deng and Liu Shaoqi again, which made Deng lose his post.

In mid-1975, with the blessing of an absent Mao who was tending to personal ailments, Deng was granted complete leadership and power in China and initiated many reforms that attempted to resolve the mistakes he saw with the cultural revolution. These reforms have since been labelled as a process of de-Maoification as he adjusted CCP policy instated previously by Mao which included changes to education, personnel, economics, science and technology in his Four Modernizations policy. Mao was an advocate of practical education outside of the classroom. Deng's reforms to educational policy limited this experience and instead focused on classroom education which Mao cited was one that made Deng a capitalist roader.

Upon the death of Zhou Enlai, a popular Chinese politician, and public dissident to Deng's reforms, Mao backpedaled on his appointment and launched the Criticise Deng Xiaoping campaign and Deng was purged for a second time in 1976. This program was an extension of the Cultural revolution and allowed students in Beijing to protest in Tiananmen Square and other Chinese cities after backlash to Deng's Four Modernizations. One poster during this campaign read "Deng, that unrepentant capitalist roader, is back on the road again". Deng was further criticized in the 1970s, in the People's Daily of the CCP Central Committee, accused of attempting to sabotage the revolution.

== Usage in academic scholarship outside of China ==
The term capitalist roader has had influence after the death of Mao and continues to be used in a variety of anti-capitalist scholarships. Indian journalist and activist Arup Baisya, used the term capitalist roaders to describe Soviet politicians after the death of Stalin who steered economic policy towards market socialism. Economist Keith Griffin described Karl Marx as having moved past a capitalist roader due to his understanding of village-based communism without industrialization.

== See also ==
- Deng Xiaoping Theory
- Marxism-Leninism-Maoism
- Peaceful Evolution theory
- Reform and opening up
- Revisionism (Marxism)
- Sino-Soviet split
