= Great Leap Forward =

1958–1962 Chinese socioeconomic campaign

- Date: 1958–1962
- Location: China
- Type: Famine, economic mismanagement
- Cause: Central planning, collectivization policies
- Motive: Economic collectivization of agriculture, realisation of socialism
- Organized by: CCP Chairman Mao Zedong
- Deaths: 15~55 million

Chinese name
- Simplified Chinese: 大跃进
- Traditional Chinese: 大躍進
Transcriptions
Standard Mandarin
- Hanyu Pinyin: Dà yuè jìn
- Bopomofo: ㄉㄚˋ ㄩㄝˋ ㄐㄧㄣˋ
- Wade–Giles: Ta^{4} yüeh^{4} chin^{4}
- Tongyong Pinyin: Dà yuè jìn
- IPA: [tâ ɥê tɕîn]
Yue: Cantonese
- Yale Romanization: Daaih yeuk jeun
- Jyutping: Daai6 joek3 zeon3
- IPA: [taj˨ jœk̚˧ tsɵn˧]
Southern Min
- Tâi-lô: Tuā io̍k tsìn

The Great Leap Forward was an industrialization campaign within China from 1958 to 1962, initiated by Mao Zedong, chairman of the Chinese Communist Party, whose goal was to transform the country from an agrarian society to an industrialized society through the formation of people's communes. The Great Leap Forward led to between 15 and 55 million deaths in mainland China during the 1959–1961 Great Chinese Famine it caused, making it the largest or second-largest famine in human history.

The Great Leap Forward grew out of Mao's push for rapid development through mass mobilization and a reaction against the Soviet development strategy. Anti-intellectual politics and the surge of less-educated radicals helped sideline technical constraints and dissent. The strategy relied on mobilizing peasants to sustain themselves while supplying grain, cash crops, and even steel for urban industry, without major new state investment. Famine worsened when procurement quotas were set using false reports from the countryside. After the 1959 Lushan Conference, anti-"rightist" campaigns intensified misreporting and coercive collection even as output fell, deepening rural famine.

In rural China, the campaign expanded mandatory collectivization and banned private farming; those who resisted were punished as "counterrevolutionaries". Authorities enforced restrictions through public struggle sessions, social pressure, and forced labor. Although rural industrialization was an official priority, its development was derailed by Great Leap policies. Economist Dwight Perkins argues that heavy investment produced little gain, calling the Great Leap Forward an expensive disaster.

The CCP studied the damage that was done at various conferences from 1960 to 1962, especially at the Seven Thousand Cadres Conference in 1962, during which Mao Zedong ceded day-to-day leadership to pragmatic moderates like Chinese President Liu Shaoqi and Vice Premier Deng Xiaoping. In the early 1960s, Mao endorsed a period of economic "readjustment" and acknowledged responsibility for mistakes, while maintaining that the "three red flags" could not be challenged.

From 1961 to 1965, official propaganda portrayed Mao as virtually infallible and shifted blame for the Great Leap Forward disaster onto lower-level officials. He initiated the Socialist Education Movement in 1963 and the Cultural Revolution in 1966 in order to remove opposition and re-consolidate his power. Dozens of dams constructed during the Great Leap Forward in Zhumadian, Henan collapsed in 1975 (under the influence of Typhoon Nina) and resulted in the 1975 Banqiao Dam failure, with estimates of its death toll ranging from tens of thousands to 240,000.

== Background ==
The core goal of the Great Leap Forward was to increase industrial and agricultural outputs by using mass mobilization to raise labor inputs and therefore overcome China's lack of material, technological and monetary inputs. The Great Leap Forward also sought to address imbalances between rural China and urban China that existed in the prerevolutionary period and continued into the 1950s.

Classical Marxist theory hypothesized a relatively linear progression of development and a worldwide revolution beginning with the most developed countries. At the founding of the People's Republic of China in 1949, the country was one of the poorest in the world. The Great Leap Forward attempted to defy the conventional understanding of the time required for economic development. Through rapid industrialization, it aimed to close the gap between China's developmental stage and its political aspirations. In March 1955, at a national conference of the Party, Mao declared that China "would catch up with and surpass the most powerful capitalist countries in several dozen years", and in October, Mao announced that he would complete the building of a socialist state in 15 years.

In the late 1950s, China's socio-political landscape experienced significant rural reforms and the aftermath of previous policies aimed at collectivization rather than individualism. Before the Great Leap Forward, the Chinese government initiated land reforms that redistributed land from landlords to peasants, but these reforms still needed to attain the expected agricultural productivity. The early 1950s saw the establishment of agricultural cooperatives, yet these changes brought mixed outcomes. However, the push towards rapid industrialization and the establishment of people's communes in rural areas were central to the Great Leap Forward, reflecting the government's belief that collectivization and large-scale projects would boost agricultural and industrial outputs. The communes were meant to centralize farming and labor, supposedly leading to increased efficiency and output; still, in reality, and practice, these measures often disrupted traditional farming practices and led to decreased productivity. Dali Yang stated, "The initial stages of collectivization brought chaos and inefficiency, with agricultural productivity often declining".

By the time of the Great Leap Forward, increased Sino-Soviet tensions meant that China could not depend on Soviet technological assistance. Mao became frustrated by Soviet reluctance to share nuclear technology and the mode of bureaucracy that they promoted. Mao emphasized China's self-reliance in technology and industry and discouraged reliance on foreign technology.

In November 1957, party leaders of communist countries gathered in Moscow to celebrate the 40th anniversary of the October Revolution. Soviet Communist Party First Secretary Nikita Khrushchev proposed not only to catch up with but exceed the United States in industrial output in the next 15 years through peaceful competition. Mao Zedong was so inspired by the slogan that China put forward its own one: to catch up with and surpass the United Kingdom in 15 years. As with its approach to agriculture, the Chinese government attempted to compensate for its inability to invest in industry with mass mobilizations to increase human labor inputs.

=== Agricultural collectives and other social changes ===
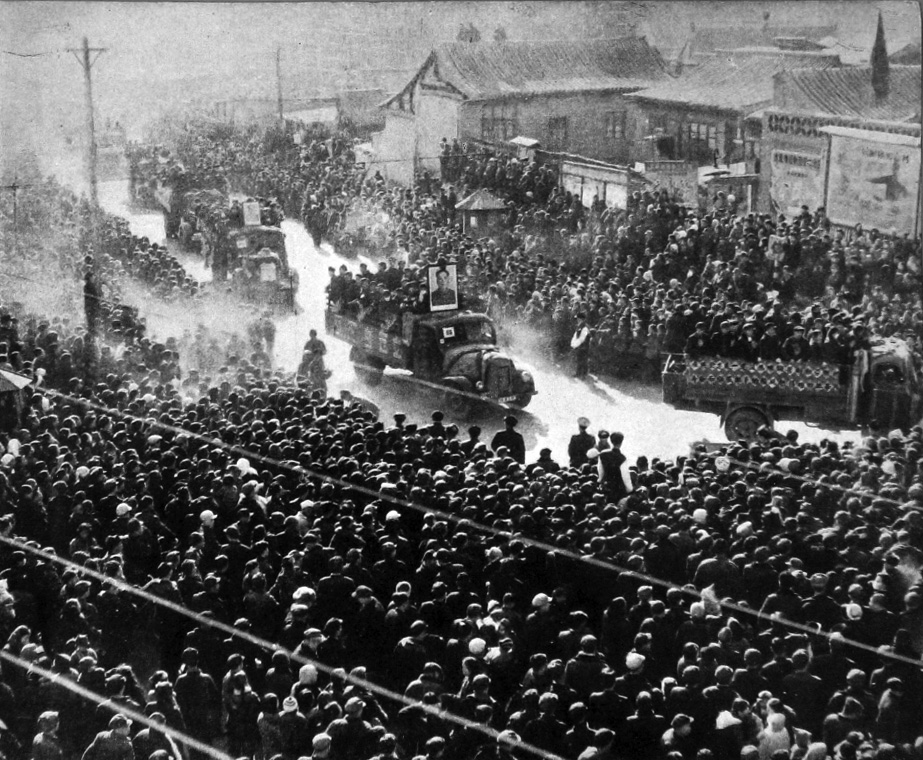
Government officials being sent to work in the countryside, 1957

Before 1949, peasants had farmed their own small pockets of land and observed traditional practices—festivals, banquets, and paying homage to ancestors. It was realized that Mao's policy of using a state monopoly on agriculture to finance industrialization would be unpopular with the peasants. Therefore, it was proposed that the peasants should be brought under Party control by the establishment of agricultural collectives which would also facilitate the sharing of tools and draft animals.

This policy was gradually pushed through between 1949 and 1958 in response to immediate policy needs, first by establishing "mutual aid teams" of 5–15 households, then in 1953 "elementary agricultural cooperatives" of 20–40 households, then from 1956 in "higher co-operatives" of 100–300 families. From 1954 onward peasants were encouraged to form and join collective-farming associations, which would supposedly increase their efficiency without robbing them of their own land or restricting their livelihoods.

By 1958, private ownership was abolished and all households were forced into state-operated communes. Mao demanded that the communes increase grain production to feed the cities and to earn foreign exchange through exports. China must follow a path to socialism different from the Soviet Union's, Mao told delegates, by allowing its peasants to participate in economic modernisation and making more use of their labour.

Apart from progressive taxation on each household's harvest, the state introduced a system of compulsory state purchases of grain at fixed prices to build up stockpiles for famine-relief and meet the terms of its trade agreements with the Soviet Union. Together, taxation and compulsory purchases accounted for 30% of the harvest by 1957, leaving very little surplus. Rationing was also introduced in the cities to curb 'wasteful consumption' and encourage savings (which were deposited in state-owned banks and thus became available for investment), and although food could be purchased from state-owned retailers the market price was higher than that for which it had been purchased. This too was done in the name of discouraging excessive consumption.

Besides these economic changes, the CCP implemented major social changes in the countryside including the banishing of all religious and mystic institutions and ceremonies, replacing them with political meetings and propaganda sessions. Attempts were made to enhance rural education and the status of women (allowing them to initiate divorce if they desired) and ending foot-binding, child marriage and opium addiction. The old system of internal passports (the hukou) was introduced in 1956, preventing inter-county travel without appropriate authorization. Highest priority was given to the urban proletariat for whom a welfare state was created.

The first phase of collectivization resulted in modest improvements in output. Famine along the mid-Yangzi was averted in 1956 through the timely allocation of food-aid, but in 1957 the Party's response was to increase the proportion of the harvest collected by the state to insure against further disasters. Moderates within the Party, including Zhou Enlai, argued for a reversal of collectivization on the grounds that claiming the bulk of the harvest for the state had made the people's food-security dependent upon the constant, efficient, and transparent functioning of the government.

=== Hundred Flowers Campaign and Anti-Rightist Campaign ===
In 1957, Mao responded to the tensions which existed in the Party by launching the Hundred Flowers Campaign as a way to promote free speech and criticism. Some scholars have retrospectively concluded that this campaign was a ploy designed to allow critics of the regime, primarily intellectuals but also low ranking members of the party who were critical of the agricultural policies, to identify themselves.

By the time of the completion of the first 5 Year Economic Plan in 1957, Mao had come to believe that the path to socialism that had been followed by the Soviet Union was not appropriate for China. He was critical of Khrushchev's reversal of Stalinist policies and he was also alarmed by the uprisings that had taken place in East Germany, Poland and Hungary, and the perception that the USSR was seeking "peaceful coexistence" with the Western powers. Mao had become convinced that China should follow its own path to communism. According to Jonathan Mirsky, a historian and a journalist who specialized in Chinese affairs, China's isolation from most of the rest of the world, along with the Korean War, had accelerated Mao's attacks on his perceived domestic enemies. It led him to accelerate his designs to develop an economy where the regime would get maximum benefit from rural taxation.

The Anti-Rightist Campaign started on 8 June 1957. The main goal was to purge "rightists" from the CCP and China altogether. It was believed that approximately 5 percent of the population were still "rightists" (Political conservatives sabotaging the revolution).

=== Rash advance movement and anti-rash advance movement ===
In the early years of the New China, due to the lack of experience in financial and economic work, it was a common practice to include the fiscal surplus of the previous year in the budget of the current year. Because of the low level of budgeting in the fiscal sector and inaccurate estimates of economic development, revenues and expenditures were underestimated. However, no problems arose because the government usually managed to end the fiscal year with a surplus. In 1953, when China entered the first five-year plan period, the Chinese economy had improved and the Ministry of Finance still decided to include the fiscal surplus of the previous fiscal year as credit funds in the 1953 budget revenue to cover the current year's expenditures. As a result, budget expenditures were expanded and so was the size of the budget. At that time, only the Soviet expert Kutuzov warned the Chinese fiscal authorities not to use the fiscal surplus of the previous year, however, it was not heeded by the Ministry of Finance. In that year, the gross industrial and agricultural output grew by 21.3%, while the capital construction budget increased by 50% compared to the previous year, which led to an imbalance between production and demand. Such was the "small rash advance" (小冒進) at the start of the first five-year plan period. The issue had caused widespread social controversy. This marked one of the first times people questioned Mao's authority. The faction of Li Xiannian, Chen Yun and others did not think it was appropriate to continue this practice, but they also had opponents. Li Xiannian finally decided to hold a collective meeting to discuss the issue, and after listening to the views of all parties, he decided to abolish the practice.

Nevertheless, the controversy over the use of the fiscal surplus persisted, which brought another reckless "rash advance" to China's economic development in 1956. At that time, China lacked consideration in three areas: capital construction, employee wages, and agricultural loans. This made the central treasury "tight" again. This drew the attention of Zhou Enlai, Li Xiannian, and others. At a state meeting held on 5 June 1956, proposals were made to curb impetuousness and rash advances, revise the 1956 national economic plan, and cut capital construction investment. Such was the anti-"rash advance" movement.

The excess of the first five-year plan gave the nation great confidence, and at the Second Plenary Session of the 8th Central Committee, "go all out, aim high, and build socialism with greater, faster, better, and more economical results" (simplified Chinese: 鼓足干劲、力争上游、多快好省地建设社会主义; traditional Chinese: 鼓足幹勁、力爭上游、多快好省地建設社會主義) was adopted as the "General Line for Socialist Construction" in China. In 1955, Mao had already expressed his belief that socialist construction should achieve "greater, faster, better, and more economical" results. These led to the re-emergence of "rash advances", which further led to the reintroduction of policies and tendencies that had previously been overturned. Those who opposed Mao's policies were accused of not upholding the tenets of the "class struggle" under the people's cult of Mao.

== Initial phase and resistance ==
=== Initial goals ===
Regarding agriculture, the Chinese government recognized the country's dilemma of feeding its rapidly growing population without the means to make significant capital improvements in agriculture. Viewing human labor as an underutilized factor of production, the government intensified the mobilization of masses of people to increase labor inputs in agriculture.

State directives during the Great Leap Forward generally emphasized combining tu (referring to mass, native, or lay/folk knowledge) with yang (referring to foreign, elite, or professional ideas). They sought to encourage the idea that people of all sorts might combine mental and physical labor to overcome conventional hierarchies and reach the Marxist idea of the "completely developed human."

During the Great Leap Forward, architectural projects were managed according to the strategy of the Three Simultaneities, a process that involved designing, preparing materials, and building at the same time.

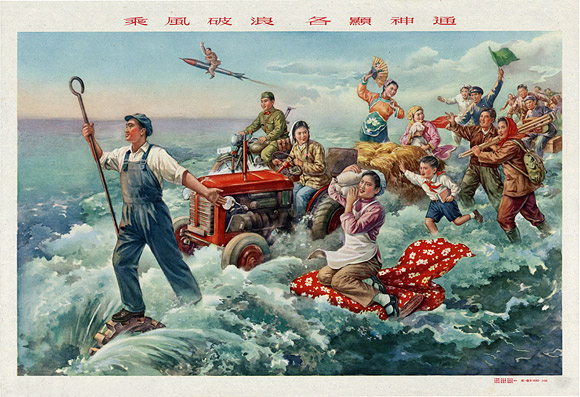
1958 poster promoting the Great Leap Forward. The text reads: "Brave the wind and the waves, everything has remarkable abilities!"

The initial projects of the Great Leap Forward were accelerating the construction of waterworks on the North China Plain during the 1957-1958 winter and next the development of people's communes and crude forms of rural industrialization. Some Great Leap Projects had lots of long-term value to China's economy and continued to benefit China after The Great Leap Forward ended. Some of the projects included bridges, railroads, canals and reservoirs. However, some of these projects were completed quickly, resulting in errors and delays that did more harm than good.

The Great Leap Forward partially socialized reproductive labor through collective housework, childcare, and the collective canteens which included free or partially free food distribution.

=== Lushan Conference and the Anti-Right Deviation Struggle ===
The initial impact of the Great Leap Forward was discussed at the Lushan Conference in July–August 1959. Although many of the more moderate leaders had reservations about the new policy, the only senior leader to speak out openly was Marshal Peng Dehuai. Mao responded to Peng's criticism of the Great Leap by dismissing Peng from his post as the Minister of National Defense, denouncing Peng and his supporters as upholding "bourgeois ideology", subsequently launching a nationwide campaign against "rightist opportunism" known as the "Anti-Right Deviation Struggle". Peng was replaced by Lin Biao, who began a systematic purge of Peng's supporters from the military. In total, over 3 million CCP members were purged or penalized during the campaign.

== Organizational and operational factors ==
The Great Leap Forward campaign began during the period of the Second Five Year Plan which was scheduled to run from 1958 to 1963, though the campaign itself was discontinued by 1961. Mao unveiled the Great Leap Forward at a meeting in January 1958 in Nanjing.

The Great Leap Forward was grounded in theory of economic development advanced by intervention in society. The central idea behind the Great Leap was that China should "walk on two legs", by rapidly developing both heavy and light industry, urban and rural areas, and large and small scale labor. Lacking material infrastructure ordinarily needed for development, Mao contended that China could overcome its limitations through focusing the revolutionary spirit of the masses.

The hope was to industrialize by making use of the massive supply of cheap labor and avoid having to import heavy machinery. The government also sought to avoid both social stratification and technical bottlenecks involved in the Soviet model of development, but sought political rather than technical solutions to do so. Distrusting technical experts, Mao and the party sought to replicate the strategies used in its 1930s regrouping in Yan'an following the Long March: "mass mobilization, social leveling, attacks on bureaucratism, [and] disdain for material obstacles". In the absence of material development inputs, Mao sought to increase development through voluntarism and organizational advantages brought about by socialism. Mao advocated that a further round of collectivization modeled on the USSR's Third Period was necessary in the countryside where the existing collectives would be merged into huge people's communes., since the countryside was significantly poorer than the cities and the people were hands-on workers.

Mao and other leaders who agreed with his approach proposed a decentralized innovation effort "using locality to drive the region" (yidian daimian 以点带面). In this approach, local party leaders encouraged grassroots experimentation and the experiments deemed as most successful could be promoted as national models.

=== People's communes ===
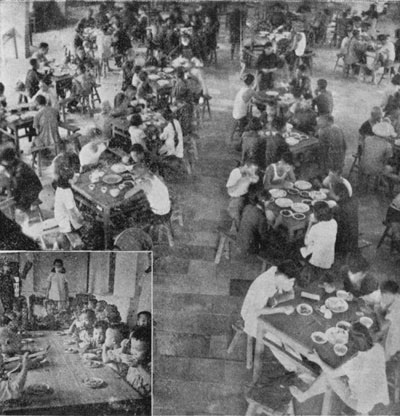
A canteen in a people's commune, 1958

An experimental commune was established at Chayashan in Henan in April 1958. Here for the first time, private plots were entirely abolished and communal kitchens were introduced. At the Politburo meetings in August 1958, it was decided that these people's communes would become the new form of economic and political organization throughout rural China. By the end of the year, approximately 25,000 communes had been set up, with an average of 5,000 households each. The communes were relatively self-sufficient co-operatives where wages and money were replaced by work points.

The commune system was aimed at maximizing production for provisioning the cities and constructing offices, factories, schools, and social insurance systems for urban-dwelling workers, cadres, and officials. Citizens in rural areas who criticized the system were labeled "dangerous". Later on, as more and more families linked together to form people's communes, peasants started to lose individual identities, since families were from vastly different communities with different cultural views, political views, family structures, and financial backgrounds, which created conflict regarding the means and modes of production. Some wealthier families who refused to join a people's commune might be labeled as rightists. Escape was also difficult or impossible, and those who attempted were subjected to "party-orchestrated public struggle", which further jeopardized their survival. Besides agriculture, communes also incorporated some light industry and construction projects. Harvests did increase in 1958. However this was because of exceptional weather, not, which a lot of officials mistook, as the result of hard work of the peasants (collectivization lowered the efficiency of labour and increased overconsumption), causing officials to raise the projected quota. This led to famine in the countryside since they were required to reach set harvest goals, leaving not enough food for themselves.

=== Industrialization ===
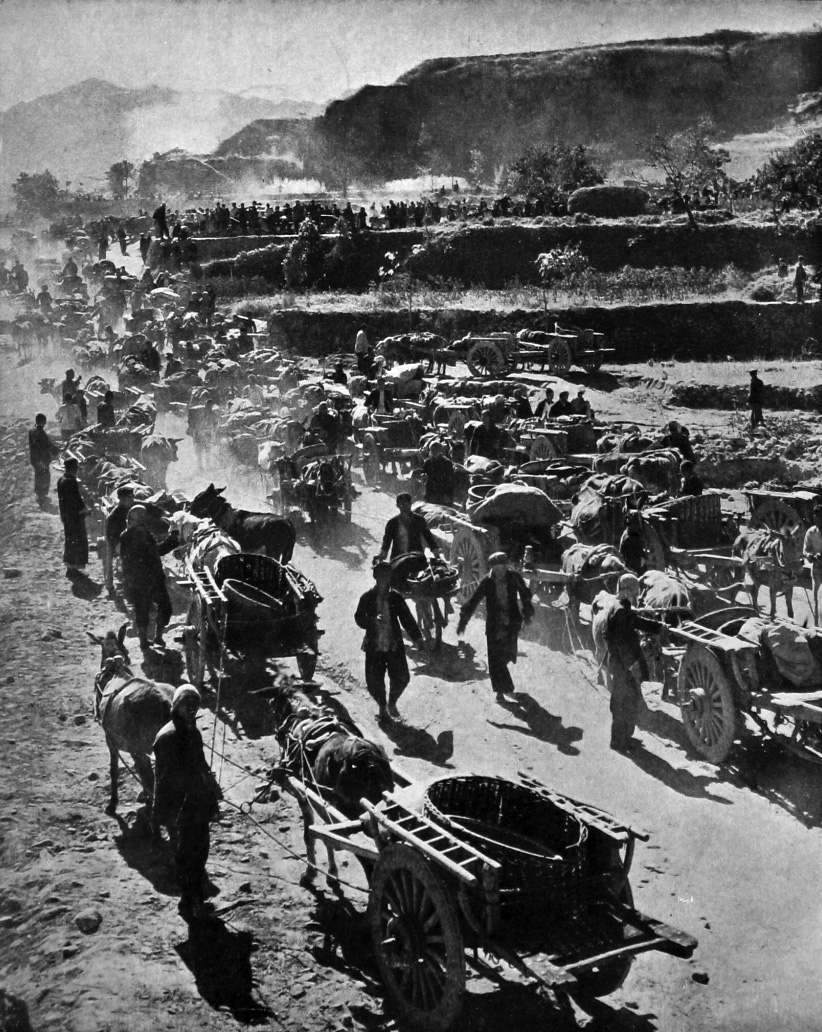
A minecart leading to the steel base, October 1957

Mao saw grain and steel production as the key pillars of economic development. He forecast that within 15 years of the start of the Great Leap, China's industrial output would surpass that of the UK. In the August 1958 Politburo meetings, it was decided that steel production would be set to double within the year, most of the increase coming through backyard steel furnaces. Major investments in larger state enterprises were made: 1,587, 1,361 and 1,815 medium and large-scale state projects were started in 1958, 1959 and 1960 respectively, more in each year than in the first Five Year Plan.

Millions of Chinese became state workers as a consequence of this industrial investment: in 1958, 21 million were added to non-agricultural state payrolls, and total state employment reached a peak of 50.44 million in 1960, more than doubling the 1957 level; the urban population swelled by 31.24 million people. These new workers placed major stress on China's food-rationing system, which led to increased and unsustainable demands on rural food production. Those between the ages of sixteen and thirty were considered ideal candidates for the militia, within the broader goal that every peasant aged sixteen to sixty should serve in the People's Militia (minbing). Peasants were working long hours, all year round, even contributed their own cooking utensils to be melted as a source of production. Officials at multiple levels inflated production figures, leaving central leaders poorly informed about conditions and encouraging further unrealistic demands.

The consequences of the Great Leap Forward were devastating, leading to one of the most severe famines in human history. The policies that diverted labor from agriculture to industrial projects, such as backyard steel furnaces, resulted in a catastrophic drop in agricultural output; consequently, food shortages became widespread. According to demographic studies, the famine caused an estimated 15 to 45 million deaths, with rural areas being the hardest hit. Ashton et al. (1984) highlight: "During the period 1958-62, about 30 million premature deaths occurred in China: deaths that occurred earlier than they would have on the basis of mortality trends for more normal years."

During this rapid expansion, coordination suffered and material shortages were frequent, resulting in "a huge rise in the wage bill, largely for construction workers, but no corresponding increase in manufactured goods". Facing a massive deficit, the government cut industrial investment from CN¥38.9 billion to CN¥7.1 billion from 1960 to 1962 (an 82% decrease; the 1957 level was CN¥14.4 billion).

=== Backyard furnaces ===
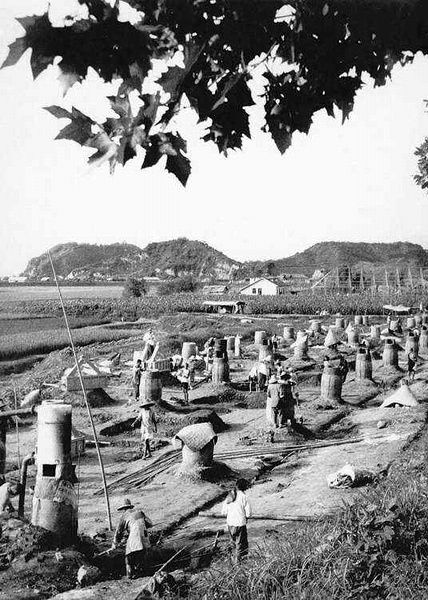
Backyard furnaces in the countryside, 1958

The Great Leap Forward sought to revive folk technologies, including in the area of steel production. China's steel industry faced a shortage of imported iron and calls to increase production of "native iron" had begun in 1956. Efforts to improve steel production were a major focus of the Great Leap Forward. By mid-1958, the Chinese state began promoting indigenous metallurgical methods and the proliferation of "folk furnaces". This was an effort to increase steel production without increased investment costs.

Although the 1958 national mobilization effort to produce steel reached its target of 10.7 million tons, more than 3 million of it was unusable.

=== Crop production experiments ===
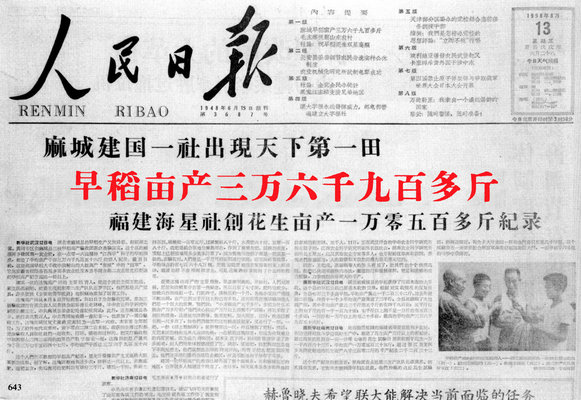
A People's Daily front-page report on 13 August 1958, that the Macheng Jianguo commune in Hubei had set a record in early rice, exceeding 36,900 jin per mu (27.675 kg/m^{2}).

On the communes, a number of radical and controversial agricultural innovations were promoted at the behest of Mao. Many of these innovations were based on the ideas of now-discredited Soviet agronomist Trofim Lysenko and his followers. The policies included close cropping, whereby seeds were sown far more densely than normal on the incorrect assumption that seeds of the same class would not compete with each other. Yang provides data on the failure of close planting techniques, which reduced yields in Anhui from 400 jin per mu to less than 200 jin per mu due to overcrowded plants competing for nutrients and sunlight." Deep plowing was encouraged on the mistaken belief that this would yield plants with extra large root systems. Moderately productive land was left unplanted based on the belief that concentrating manure and effort on the most fertile land would lead to large productivity gains per-acre. Altogether, these untested innovations generally led to decreases in grain production rather than increases.

Meanwhile, local leaders were pressured into falsely reporting ever-higher grain production figures to their political superiors. Participants at political meetings remembered production figures being inflated up to 10 times their actual production amounts as the race to please superiors and win plaudits—like the chance to meet Mao himself—intensified. The state was later able to force many production groups to sell more grain than they could spare based on these false production figures.

=== Treatment of villagers ===
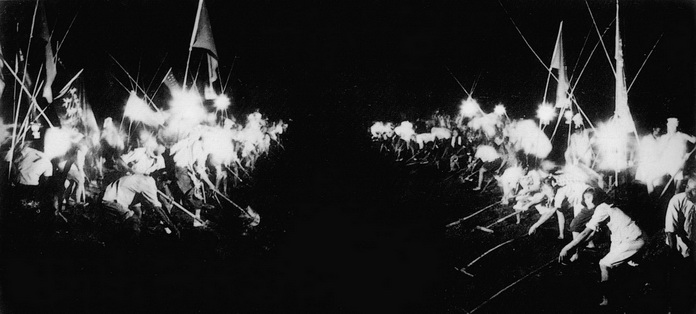
Commune members working fields at night using lamps

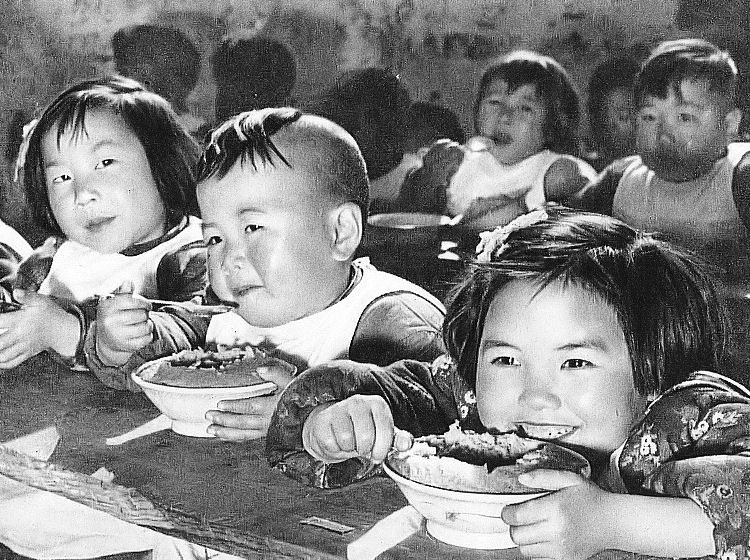
People's commune at a nursery school

The ban on private holdings severely disrupted peasant life at its most basic level. Villagers were unable to secure enough food to go on living because they were deprived by the commune system of their traditional means of being able to rent, sell, or use their land as collateral for loans. In one village, once the commune was operational, the Party boss and his colleagues "swung into manic action, herding villagers into the fields to sleep and to work intolerable hours, and forcing them to walk, starving, to distant additional projects".

Edward Friedman, political scientist, Paul Pickowicz, historian, and Mark Selden, sociologist, wrote about the dynamic of interaction between the Party and villagers:

Beyond attack, beyond question, was the systemic and structured dynamic of the socialist state that intimidated and impoverished millions of patriotic and loyal villagers.

The authors present a similar picture to Thaxton in depicting the party's destruction of the traditions of Chinese villagers. Traditionally prized local customs were deemed signs of feudalism to be extinguished. "Among them were funerals, weddings, local markets, and festivals. The Party thus destroyed much that gave meaning to Chinese lives. These private bonds were social glue. To mourn and to celebrate is to be human. To share joy, grief, and pain is humanizing." Failure to participate in the CCP's political campaigns—though the aims of such campaigns were often conflicting—"could result in detention, torture, death, and the suffering of entire families".

Public struggle sessions were often used to intimidate the peasants into obeying local officials; they increased the death rate of the famine in several ways. "In the first case, blows to the body caused internal injuries that, in combination with physical emaciation and acute hunger, could induce death." In one case, after a peasant stole two cabbages from the common fields, the thief was publicly criticized for half a day. He collapsed, fell ill, and never recovered. Others were sent to labor camps.

About 7% of those who died during the Great Leap Forward were tortured to death or summarily killed. Benjamin Valentino notes that "communist officials sometimes tortured and killed those accused of failing to meet their grain quota".

However, J. G. Mahoney has said that "there is too much diversity and dynamism in the country for one work to capture ... rural China as if it were one place." Mahoney describes an elderly man in rural Shanxi who recalls Mao fondly, saying "Before Mao we sometimes ate leaves, after liberation we did not." Regardless, Mahoney points out that Da Fo villagers recall the Great Leap Forward as a period of famine and death, and among those who survived in Da Fo were precisely those who could digest leaves.

== Direct consequences ==
The failure of agricultural policies, the movement of farmers from agricultural to industrial work, and weather conditions suppressed the food supply. The shortage of supply clashed with an explosion in demand, leading to millions of deaths from severe famine. The economy, which had improved since the end of the civil war, was devastated, and in response to the severe conditions, there was resistance among the populace.

The effects on the upper levels of government in response to the disaster were complex, with Mao purging the Minister of National Defense Peng Dehuai in 1959, the temporary promotion of Lin Biao, Liu Shaoqi, and Deng Xiaoping, and Mao losing some power and prestige following the Great Leap Forward, during the Seven Thousand Cadres Conference in 1962, which led him to launch the Cultural Revolution in 1966.

Birth and death rate in China

=== Famine ===
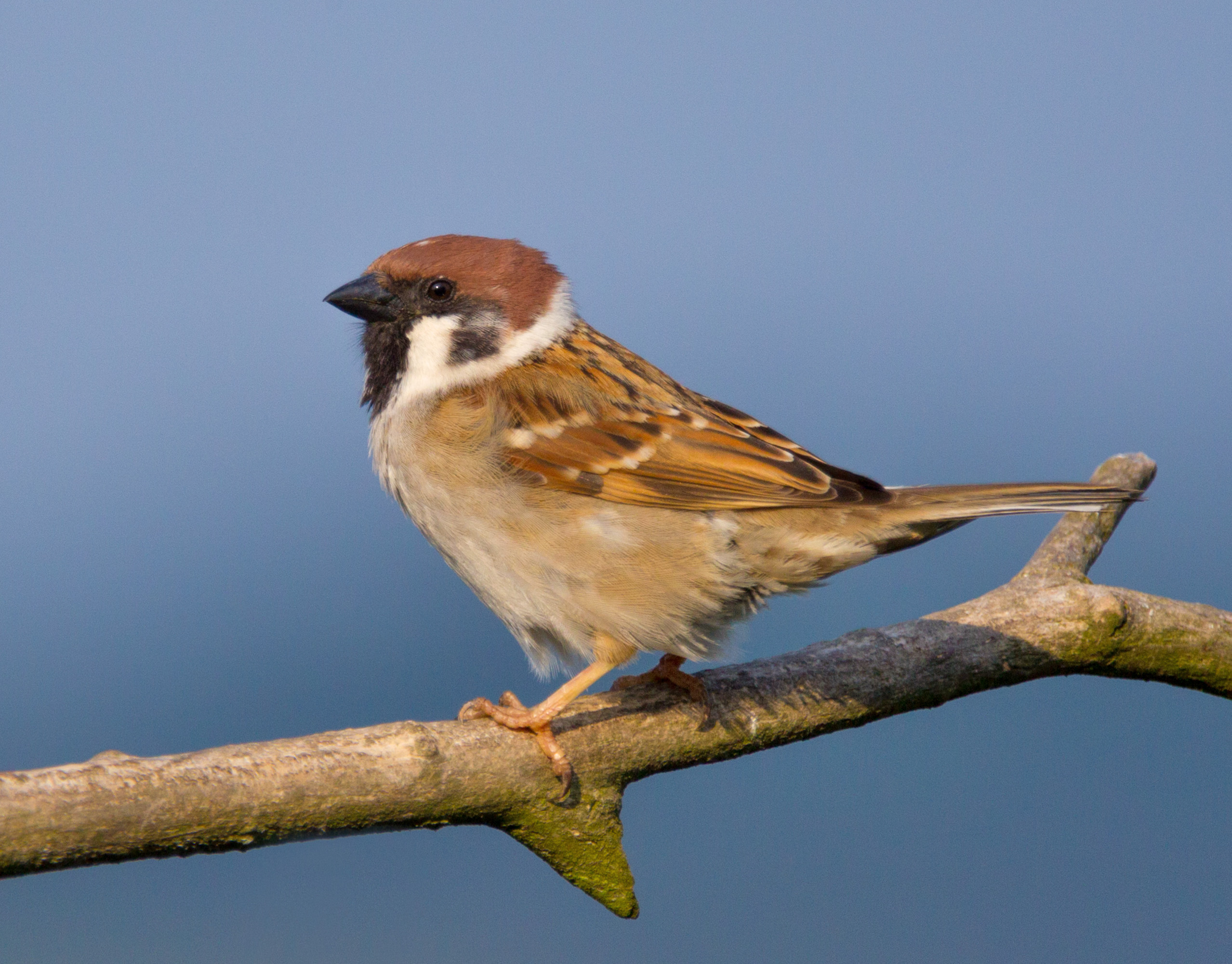
The Eurasian tree sparrow was the most notable target of the Four Pests campaign.

Despite the harmful agricultural innovations, the weather was very favorable in 1958 and the harvest was also good. However, the amount of labor which was diverted to steel production and construction projects meant that much of the harvest was left to rot because it was not collected in some areas. This problem was exacerbated by a devastating swarm of locusts, which was caused when their natural predators were killed as part of the Four Pests Campaign.

Although actual harvests were reduced, local officials, under tremendous pressure to report record harvests to central authorities in response to the innovations, competed with each other to announce increasingly exaggerated results. These results were used as the basis for determining the amount of grain which would be taken by the State, supplied to the towns and cities and exported. This barely left enough grain for the peasants, and in some areas, starvation set in. A 1959 drought and flooding from the Yellow River in the same year also contributed to the famine.

During 1958–1960 China continued to be a substantial net exporter of grain, despite the widespread famine which was being experienced in the countryside, as Mao sought to maintain face and convince the outside world of the success of his plans. Foreign aid was refused. When the Japanese foreign minister told his Chinese counterpart Chen Yi about an offer of 100,000 tonnes of wheat which was going to be shipped away from public view, he was rebuffed.

John F. Kennedy was also aware that the Chinese were exporting food to Africa and Cuba during the famine. He said during the news conference on 23 May 1962, "Well, there has been no indication of any expression of interest or desire by the Chinese Communists to receive any food from us, as I have said at the beginning, and we would certainly have to have some idea as to whether the food was needed and under what conditions it might be distributed. Up to the present, we have had no such indication." But Kennedy said that the US provided food for about half a million refugees in British Hong Kong.

With dramatically reduced yields, even urban areas received greatly reduced rations; however, mass starvation was largely confined to the countryside, where, as a result of drastically inflated production statistics, very little grain was left for the peasants to eat. Food shortages were bad throughout the country, but the provinces which had adopted Mao's reforms with the most vigor, such as Anhui, Gansu and Henan, tended to suffer disproportionately. Sichuan, one of China's most populous provinces, known in China as "Heaven's Granary" because of its fertility, is thought to have suffered the highest number of deaths from starvation due to the vigor with which provincial leader Li Jingquan undertook Mao's reforms. There are widespread oral reports, though little official documentation, of cannibalism being practiced in various forms as a result of the famine. Author Yan Lianke also claims that, while growing up in Henan during the Great Leap Forward, he was taught to "recognize the most edible kinds of bark and clay by his mother. When all of the trees had been stripped and there was no more clay, he learned that lumps of coal could appease the devil in his stomach, at least for a little while."

The agricultural policies of the Great Leap Forward and the associated famine continued until early 1961, when the Ninth Plenum of the 8th Central Committee marked a shift toward a program of "adjustment, consolidation, filling out, and improvement" and began reversing the more extreme policies. The government contracted for grain imports in 1961 amid serious food shortages. As a result, China subsequently imported large quantities of grain between 1961 and 1963, primarily from Australia and Canada, which were used to secure urban food supplies and helped reduce grain procurement demands on rural producers.

==== Deaths by famine ====
The exact number of deaths by famine is difficult to determine, and estimates range from 15 million to 55 million people. Because of the uncertainties which are involved in estimating the number of deaths which were caused by the failure of the Great Leap Forward and the ensuing famine and because of the uncertainties which are involved in estimating the numbers of deaths which were caused by other famines, it is difficult to compare the severity of different famines. If an estimate of 30 million deaths is accepted, the failure of the Great Leap Forward caused the deadliest famine in the history of China, and it also caused the deadliest famine in human history. This extremely high loss of human lives was partially caused by China's large population. To put things into absolute and relative numerical perspective: in the Great Irish Famine, approximately 1 million people out of a total population of 8 million people died, or 12.5% of Ireland's entire population. If approximately 23 million people out of a total population of 650 million people died during the Great Chinese Famine, the percentage would be 3.5%. Hence, the famine during the Great Leap Forward had the highest absolute death toll, though not the highest relative (percentage) one.

The Great Leap Forward reversed the downward trend in mortality that had occurred since 1950, though even during the Leap, mortality may not have reached pre-1949 levels. (Note: Li compares official crude death rates for the years 1959–1962 (11.98, 14.59, 25.43, and 14.24 per thousand, respectively) with the nationwide crude death rate reported by the Nationalist government for the years 1936 and 1938 (27.6 and 28.2 per thousand, respectively).) Famine deaths and the reduction in number of births caused the population of China to drop in 1960 and 1961. (Note: Both Ashton and Banister get their data from Statistical Yearbook of China 1983 published by the State Statistical Bureau.) This was only the third time in 600 years that the population of China had decreased. Mao suggested, in a discussion with Field Marshal Montgomery in Autumn 1961, that "unnatural deaths" exceeded 5 million in 1960–1961, according to a declassified CIA report. After the Great Leap Forward, mortality rates decreased to below pre-Leap levels and the downward trend begun in 1950 continued.

The severity of the famine varied from region to region. By correlating the increases in the death rates of different provinces, Peng Xizhe found that Gansu, Sichuan, Guizhou, Hunan, Guangxi, and Anhui were the hardest-hit regions, while Heilongjiang, Inner Mongolia, Xinjiang, Tianjin, and Shanghai experienced the lowest increases in death rates during the Great Leap Forward (there was no data for Tibet). In some areas, people resorted to eating tree bark and dirt, and in some places cannibalism as a result of starvation. Peng also noted that the increase in death rates in urban areas was about half the increase in death rates in rural areas. According to Chinese government reports in the Fuyang Party History Research Office, between 1959 and 1961, 2.4 million people from Fuyang died from the famine.

=== Long-term impact ===
The long-term impact of the Great Leap Forward extended beyond immediate famine and loss of life. The policies and their disastrous outcomes led to significant changes in Chinese society and governance. In rural areas, the effects on education and women's labor roles were profound. The collapse of agricultural production systems and the communal structure led to a reevaluation of economic strategies in subsequent decades. Rural education suffered due to the upheaval, and while women were initially mobilized into the workforce, the ensuing chaos often negated these advances. Dali Yang explains, "The Great Leap Forward's failure necessitated significant policy shifts, leading to a more pragmatic approach in China's economic reforms."

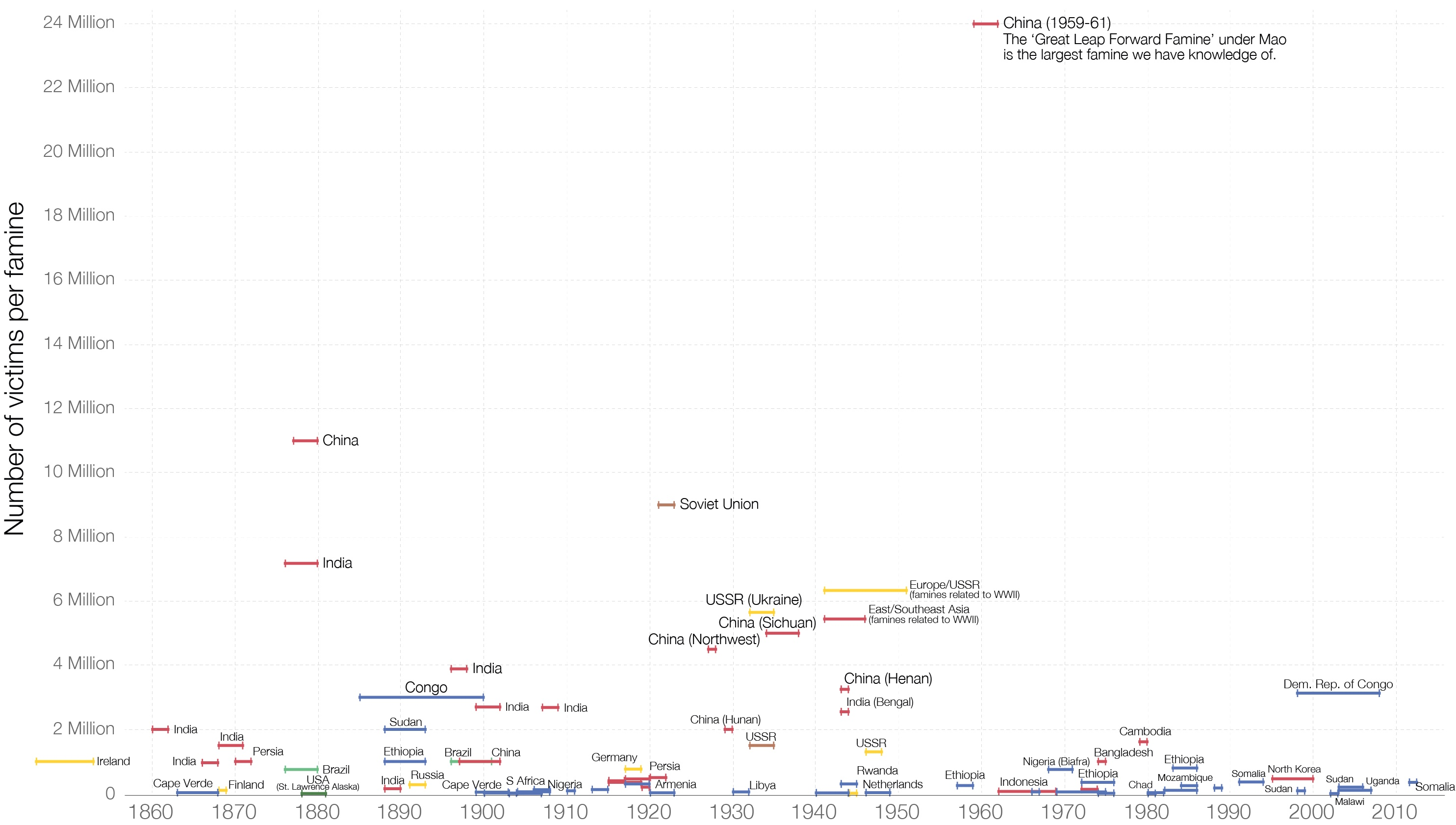
Global famines history

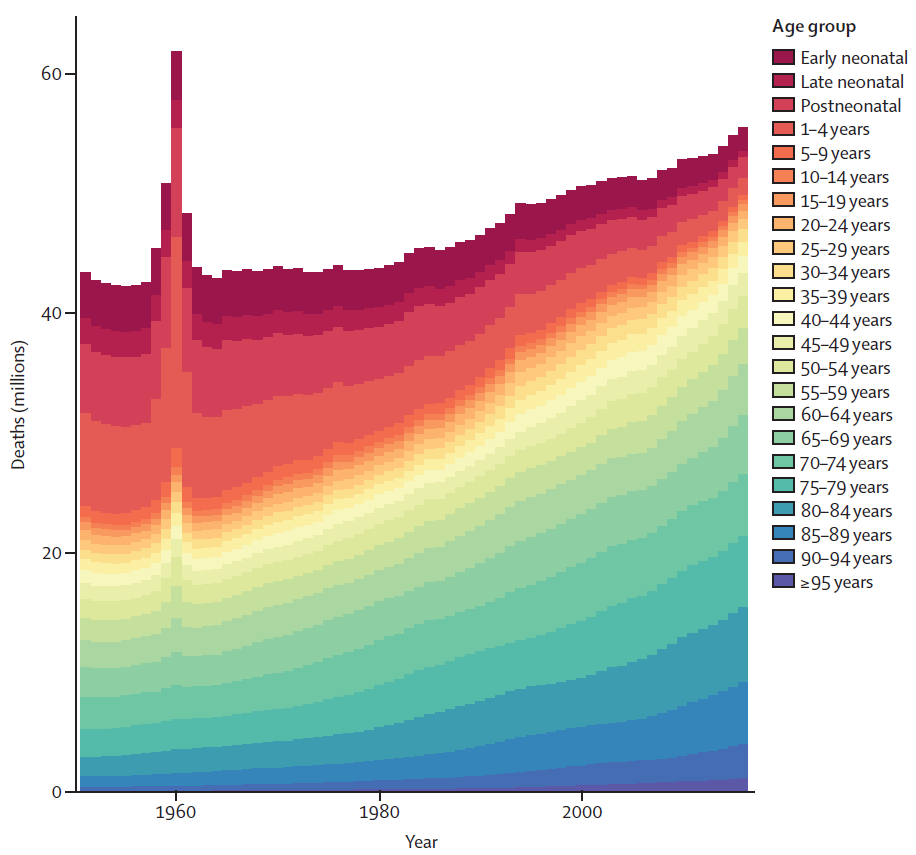
The Great Leap Forward produced a significant spike in the global number of deaths (1950–2017)

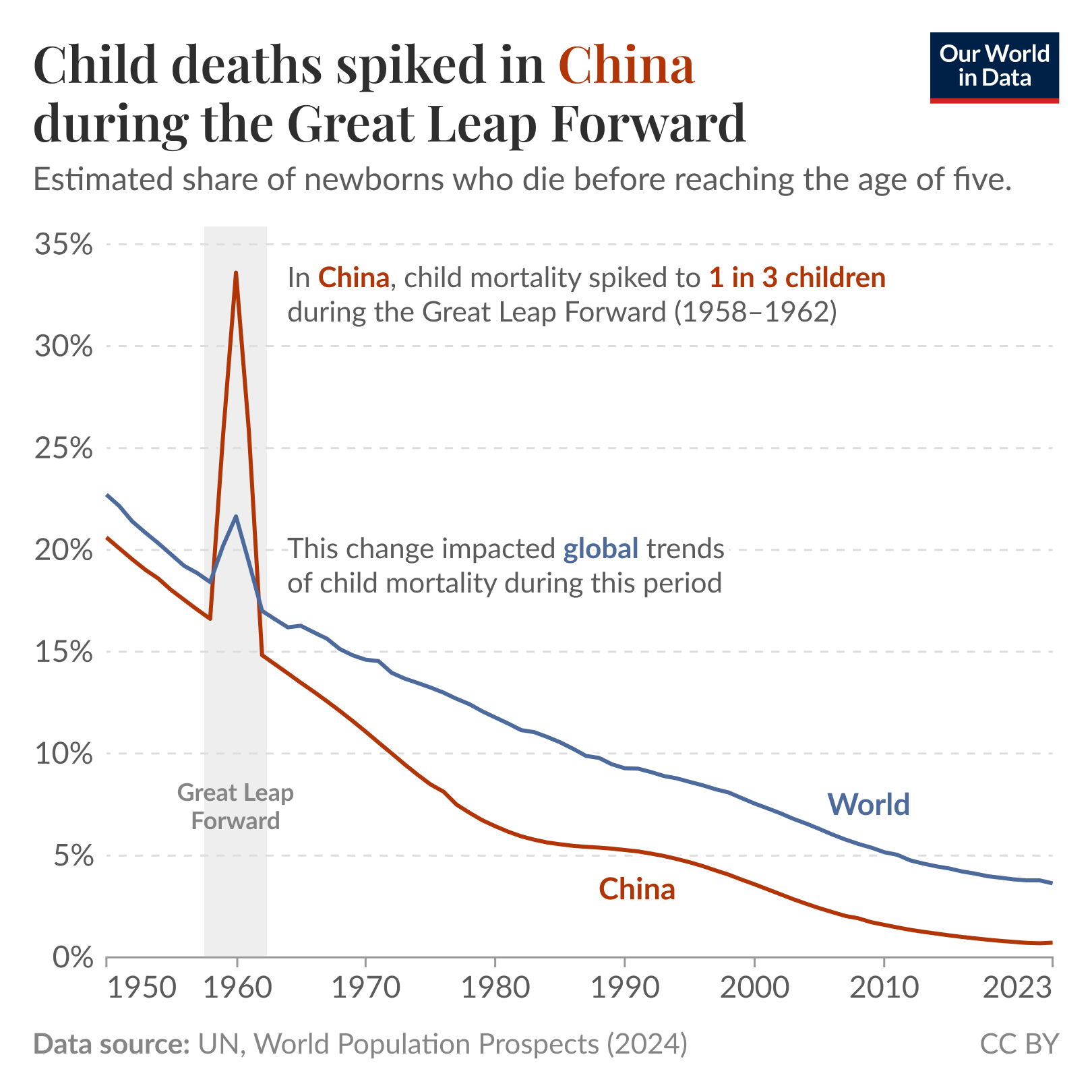
The Great Leap Forward caused a dramatic spike in child deaths

==== Methods of estimating the death toll and methods of identifying the sources of the error ====
Estimates of Great Chinese Famine death toll
| Deaths (millions) | Author(s) | Year |
|---|---|---|
| 15 | Houser, Sands, and Xiao (Note: This estimate concludes that the excess death count by manmade causes numbers some 10.3 million, 69% of the total estimated deaths.) | 2005 |
| 18 | Yao | 1999 |
| 23 | Peng | 1987 |
| 27 | Coale (Note: Coale estimates 27 million deaths: 16 million from direct interpretation of official Chinese vital statistics followed by an adjustment to 27 million to account for under-counting.) | 1984 |
| 30 | Ashton, et al. | 1984 |
| 30 | Banister | 1987 |
| 30 | Becker | 1996 |
| 32.5 | Cao | 2005 |
| 36 | Yang | 2008 |
| 38 | Chang and Halliday (Note: Stuart Schram believes their estimate "may well be the most accurate".) | 2005 |
| 38 | Rummel | 2008 |
| 45 minimum | Dikötter | 2010 |
| 43 to 46 | Chen | 1980 |
| 55 | Yu Xiguang | 2005 |

Some outlier estimates include 11 million by Utsa Patnaik, an Indian Marxist economist, 3.66 million by Chinese mathematician Sun Jingxian (孙经先) and 2.6–4 million by Chinese historian and political economist Yang Songlin (杨松林).

The number of famine deaths during the Great Leap Forward has been estimated with different methods. Banister, Coale, and Ashton et al. compare age cohorts from the 1953, 1964, and 1982 censuses, yearly birth and death records, and results of the 1982 1:1000 fertility survey. From these they calculate excess deaths above a death rate interpolated between pre- and post-Leap death rates. All involve corrections for perceived errors inherent in the different data sets. Peng uses reported deaths from the vital statistics of 14 provinces, adjusts 10% for under reporting, and expands the result to cover all of China assuming similar mortality rates in the other provinces. He uses 1956/57 death rates as the baseline death rate rather than an interpolation between pre- and post-GLF death rates. (Note: Peng used the pre-Leap death rate as a base line under the assumption that the decrease after the Great Leap to below pre-Leap levels was caused by Darwinian selection during the massive deaths of the famine. He writes that if this drop was instead a continuation of the decreasing mortality in the years prior to the Great Leap, his estimate would be an underestimate.)

Houser, Sands, and Xiao in their 2005 research study using "provincial-level demographic panel data and a Bayesian empirical approach in an effort to distinguish the relative importance of weather and national policy on China's great demographic disaster" conclude that "in aggregate, from 1959 to 1961 China suffered about 14.8 million excess deaths. Of those, about 69% (or 10.3 million) seem attributable to effects stemming from national policies."

Cao uses information from "local annals" to determine for each locality the expected population increase from normal births and deaths, the population increase due to migration, and the loss of population between 1958 and 1961. He then adds the three figures to determine the number of excess deaths during the period 1959–1961. Chang and Halliday use death rates determined by "Chinese demographers" for the years 1957–1963, subtract the average of the pre-and post-Leap death rates (1957, 1962, and 1963) from the death rates of each of the years 1958–1961, and multiply each yearly excess death rate by the year's population to determine excess deaths.

Chen Yizi, a top adviser to CCP General Secretary Zhao Ziyang and former head of the Institute for Economic Structural Reform, concluded 43 million died in the famine after conducting a county-by-county review of deaths in five provinces and performing extrapolation. Chen was part of a large investigation group led by the Institute for Economic Structural Reform which "visited every province and examined internal Party documents and records".

Becker, Rummel, Dikötter, and Yang each compare several earlier estimates. Becker considers Banister's estimate of 30 million excess deaths to be "the most reliable estimate we have". Rummel initially took Coale's 27 million as a "most likely figure", then accepted the later estimate of 38 million by Chang and Halliday after it was published. Dikötter judged Chen's estimate of 43 to 46 million to be "in all likelihood a reliable estimate". He also claimed that at least 2.5 million of these deaths were caused by beatings, tortures, or summary executions. On the other hand, Daniel Vukovich asserts that this claim is coming from a problematic and unverified reference, because Chen simply threw that number as an "estimate" during an interview and because Chen hasn't published any scholarly work on the subject. Yang takes Cao's, Wang Weizhi's, and Jin Hui's estimates ranging from 32.5 to 35 million excess deaths for the period 1959–1961, adds his own estimates for 1958 (0.42 million) and 1962 (2.23 million) "based on official figures reported by the provinces" to get 35 to 37 million, and chooses 36 million as a number that "approaches the reality but is still too low".

Estimates contain several sources of error. National census data was not accurate and even the total population of China at the time was not known to within 50 to 100 million people. The statistical reporting system had been taken over by party cadre from statisticians in 1957, making political considerations more important than accuracy and resulting in a complete breakdown in the statistical reporting system. Population figures were routinely inflated at the local level, often in order to obtain increased rations of goods. During the Cultural Revolution, a great deal of the material in the State Statistical Bureau was burned.

According to Jasper Becker, under-reporting of deaths was also a problem. The death registration system, which was inadequate before the famine, was completely overwhelmed by the large number of deaths during the famine. In addition, he claims that many deaths went unreported so that family members of the deceased could continue to draw the deceased's food ration and that counting the number of children who both were born and died between the 1953 and 1964 censuses is problematic. However, Ashton, et al. believe that because the reported number of births during the GLF seems accurate, the reported number of deaths should be accurate as well. Massive internal migration made both population counts and registering deaths problematic, though Yang believes the degree of unofficial internal migration was small and Cao's estimate takes internal migration into account.

Coale's, Banister's, Ashton et al.'s, and Peng's figures all include adjustments for demographic reporting errors, though Dikötter, in his book Mao's Great Famine, argues that their results, as well as Chang and Halliday's, Yang's, and Cao's, are still underestimates. The System Reform Institute's (Chen's) estimate has not been published and therefore it cannot be verified.

==== Causes of the famine and responsibility for it ====
The policies of the Great Leap Forward, the failure of the government to respond quickly and effectively to famine conditions, as well as Mao's insistence on maintaining high grain export quotas in the face of clear evidence of poor crop output were responsible for the famine. There is disagreement over how much, if at all, weather conditions contributed to the famine.

Significant amounts of agricultural labor had been transferred for steel production, resulting in a shortage of agricultural workers. Approximately 10% of crops could not be harvested as a result.

Yang Jisheng, a former CCP member and former reporter for the official Chinese news agency Xinhua, puts the blame squarely on Maoist policies and the political system of totalitarianism, such as diverting agricultural workers to steel production instead of growing crops, and exporting grain at the same time. During the course of his research, Yang uncovered that some 22 million tons of grain was held in public granaries at the height of the famine, reports of starvation went up the bureaucracy only to be ignored by top officials, and the authorities ordered that statistics be destroyed in regions where population decline became evident. Using Henan as an example, Yang documents that inflated reports claimed production of 1200 jin per mu, while the actual production was closer to 600 jin per mu, resulting in excessive grain requisitions and local starvation, nearly 6% of the population died. In the later book, Yang states, "36 million Chinese starved to death in the years between 1958 and 1962, while 40 million others failed to be born, which means that "China's total population loss during the Great Famine then comes to 76 million."

Economist Steven Rosefielde argues that Yang's account "shows that Mao's slaughter was caused in considerable part by terror-starvation; that is, voluntary manslaughter (and perhaps murder) rather than innocuous famine." Yang claims that local party officials were indifferent to the large number of people dying around them, as their primary concern was the delivery of grain, which Mao wanted to use to pay back debts to the USSR totaling 1.973 billion yuan. In Xinyang, people died of starvation at the doors of grain warehouses. Mao refused to open the state granaries as he dismissed reports of food shortages and accused the "rightists" and the kulaks of conspiring to hide grain.

From his research into records and talks with experts at the meteorological bureau, Yang concludes that the weather during the Great Leap Forward was not unusual compared to other periods and was not a factor. Yang also believes that the Sino-Soviet split was not a factor because it did not happen until 1960, when the famine was well under way.

Mao's efforts to cool the Leap in late 1958 met resistance within the Party and when Mao proposed a scaling down of steel targets, "many people just wouldn't change and wouldn't accept it". Thus, according to historian Tao Kai, the Leap "wasn't the problem of a single person, but that many people had ideological problems". Tao also pointed out that "everyone was together" on the Anti-Rightist Campaign and only a minority didn't approve of the Great Leap's policies or put forth different opinions. The actions of the party under Mao in the face of widespread famine are reminiscent of Soviet policy nearly three decades earlier during the Soviet famine of 1932-33. At that time, the USSR exported grain for international propaganda purposes despite millions dying of starvation across southern areas of the Soviet Union.

Benjamin Valentino writes that like in the USSR during the famine of 1932–33, peasants were confined to their starving villages by a system of household registration, and the worst effects of the famine were directed against enemies of the regime. Those labeled as "black elements" (religious leaders, rightists, rich peasants, etc.) in any previous campaign were given the lowest priority in the allocation of food, and therefore died in the greatest numbers. Drawing from Jasper Becker's book Hungry Ghosts, genocide scholar Adam Jones states that "no group suffered more than the Tibetans" from 1959 to 1962.

Ashton, et al. write that policies leading to food shortages, natural disasters, and a slow response to initial indications of food shortages were to blame for the famine. Policies leading to food shortages included the implementation of the commune system and an emphasis on non-agricultural activities such as backyard steel production. Natural disasters included drought, flood, typhoon, plant disease, and insect pest. The slow response was in part due to a lack of objective reporting on the agricultural situation, including a "nearly complete breakdown in the agricultural reporting system".

This was partly caused by strong incentives for officials to over-report crop yields. According to Frank Dikötter, local officials frequently reported production figures 30-40% higher than the actual output to meet the central government's ambitious targets. The unwillingness of the Central Government to seek international aid was a major factor; China's net grain exports in 1959 and 1960 would have been enough to feed 16 million people 2000 calories per day. Ashton, et al. conclude that "It would not be inaccurate to say that 30 million people died prematurely as a result of errors of internal policy and flawed international relations."

Mobo Gao suggested that the Great Leap Forward's terrible effects came not from malignant intent on the part of the Chinese leadership at the time, but instead related to the structural nature of its rule, and the vastness of China as a country. Gao says "the terrible lesson learnt is that China is so huge and when it is uniformly ruled, follies or wrong policies will have grave implications of tremendous magnitude".

In the official Resolution on Certain Questions in the History of Our Party since the Founding of the People's Republic of China passed in 1981, the CCP called the purge of the so-called anti-Party clique of Peng Dehuai and others as "entirely wrong" and cut short the process of the rectification of "Left" errors. The 1981 Resolution also states that, "it was mainly due to the errors of the Great Leap Forward and of the struggle against 'Right opportunism' together with a succession of natural calamities and the perfidious scrapping of contracts by the Soviet Government that our economy encountered serious difficulties between 1959 and 1961, which caused serious losses to our country and people."

=== Deaths by violence ===
Not all deaths during the Great Leap were from starvation. In accounts documented by Yang Jisheng, people were beaten or killed for rebelling against the government, reporting the real harvest numbers, for sounding alarm, for refusing to hand over what little food they had left, for trying to flee the famine area, for begging for food or as little as stealing scraps or angering officials.

== Other impacts ==
=== Failures of the food supply ===
In agrarian policy, the failures of the food supply during the Great Leap were met by a gradual de-collectivization over the course of the 1960s that foreshadowed the further measures taken under Deng Xiaoping. Political scientist Meredith Jung-En Woo argues: "Unquestionably the regime failed to respond in time to save the lives of millions of peasants, but when it did respond, it ultimately transformed the livelihoods of several hundred million peasants (modestly in the early 1960s, but permanently after Deng Xiaoping's reforms subsequent to 1978)."

Despite the risks to their careers, some CCP members openly laid blame for the disaster at the feet of party leadership and took it as proof that China must rely more on education, acquiring technical expertise and applying bourgeois methods in developing the economy. Liu Shaoqi made a speech at the Seven Thousand Cadres Conference in 1962, stating that "[the] economic disaster was 30% fault of nature, 70% human error."

A 2017 paper by economists found "strong evidence that the unrealistic yield targets led to excessive death tolls from 1959 to 1961, and further analysis shows that yield targets induced the inflation of grain output figures and excessive procurement. We also find that Mao's radical policy caused serious deterioration in human capital accumulation and slower economic development in the policy-affected regions decades after the death of Mao."

A dramatic decline in grain output continued for several years, involving in 1960–61 a drop in output of more than 25 percent. Causes of this drop are found in both natural disaster and government policy.

=== Industrialization ===
Overall, the Great Leap Forward failed to rapidly industrialize China as intended; however, there was significant capital construction (especially in iron, steel, mining and textile enterprises) that ultimately contributed greatly to China's later industrialization.

The Great Leap Forward period marked the initiation of China's rapid growth in tractor and fertilizer production.

The national Tool Reform campaign encouraged improvements and innovation in tools. It sought to replace inefficient traditional tools like carrying poles and baskets with more efficient techniques, like tools which utilized gravity or which converted sliding motion into rolling motion. The campaign resulted in major improvements of tools throughout China, resolving supply bottlenecks for components like ball bearings, and the ubiquity of equipment like double-wheeled push carts.

The successful construction of the Daqing oil field despite harsh weather conditions and supply limitations became a model held up by the Party as an example during subsequent industrialization campaigns. During its 1960 construction, Oil Minister Yu Qiuli mobilized workers through ideological motivation instead of material incentives, focusing enthusiasm, energy, and resources to complete a rapid industrialization project. The project also delivered critical economic benefits because without the production of the Daqing oil field, crude oil would have been severely limited after the Soviet Union cut off supplies as a result of the Sino-Soviet split.

Large-scale irrigation projects begun during the late 1950s as part of the Great Leap Forward continued to grow rapidly until the late 1970s.

During the Great Leap Forward, control of state-owned enterprises was largely decentralized, with control being transferred to local governments from the central government. This process of decentralization also significantly increased the power of local Party organizations.

=== Women's labor advancement ===
The Great Leap Forward's focus on total workforce mobilization resulted in opportunities for women's labor advancement. Increasing collectivization of labor brought more opportunities for women to "leave the home", thereby increasing their economic and personal independence. The number of women in state institutions and state-owned enterprises more than tripled during the period 1957 to 1960.

As women became increasingly needed to work in agriculture and industry, and encouraged by policy to do so, the phenomenon of Iron Women arose. Women did traditionally male work in both fields and factories, including major movements of women into management positions. Women competed for high productivity, and those who distinguished themselves came to be called Iron Women. Slogans such as "There is no difference between men and women in this new age," and "We can do anything, and anything we do, we can do it well," became popular.

Neighborhood production teams established during this period offered women labor that allowed them to leave the home without leaving the neighborhood community. This mode of labor provided urban women with the right to work while still preserving existing forms of household social life.

=== Education ===
During the Great Leap Forward, the number of universities in China increased to 1,289 by 1960 and nationwide enrollment more than doubled to 962,000 in 1960. This was a wave of "great leap forward" in higher education. Many of the newly established universities, however, were affiliated with people's communes and were directly transformed from local middle schools. For example, in Xushui County, Hebei, every commune built one university of its own and local middle school teachers were promoted to professors; for another example, in Suiping County, Henan, a new university was established with 10 departments and 529 students, where some "professors" were actually teachers from local elementary school. According to official sources:

Some comrades expressed the fear that the movement would be a mockery of school education ....With regard to the development of higher education, some comrades, hearing that peasants have set up their own universities in the countryside, would ridicule the idea, believing that a university without a staff of qualified professors and students who have graduated from senior middle schools cannot be called a university.

Educational reforms during the Great Leap Forward emphasized student discussion and learning from members of the community and downplayed the role of memorization and textbooks. The CCP encouraged teachers to bring workers, peasants, and soldiers into the classroom to directly share experiences with the students.

Other educational reforms during the Great Leap Forward sought to increase student and staff participation in the administration process, to favor students from worker, peasant, or soldier backgrounds in admissions, and to increase the role of the CCP and of politics in schools. Beginning in 1961, universities rolled back these policy initiatives, and increase meritocratic university policies instead of egalitarian ones.

=== Other scientific impacts ===
The development and construction of biogas digestors by peasants was widespread from the early part of the Great Leap Forward until the early 1970s. As of 2026, the Chinese experience with biogas digestors continues to influence similar efforts in developing countries.

A movement in meteorological sciences focused on incorporating peasant knowledge into meteorology via integrating weather watching experience, local farming knowledge, and traditional weather wisdom.

During the Great Leap Forward, the PRC used temple fairs as events to promote scientific education, and new technology and inventions.

=== Resistance ===
There were various forms of resistance to the consequences of the Great Leap Forward. Several provinces saw armed rebellion, though these rebellions never posed a serious threat to the Central Government. Rebellions are documented to have occurred in Henan, Shandong, Qinghai, Gansu, Sichuan, Fujian, Yunnan, and Tibet. In Henan, Shandong, Qinghai, Gansu, and Sichuan, these rebellions lasted more than a year, with the Spirit Soldier rebellion of 1959 being one of the few larger-scale uprisings. There was also occasional violence against cadre members. Raids on granaries, arson and other vandalism, train robberies, and raids on neighboring villages and counties were common.

According to Ralph Thaxton, professor of politics at Brandeis University, villagers turned against the CCP during and after the Great Leap, seeing it as autocratic, brutal, corrupt, and mean-spirited. According to Thaxton, the CCP's policies included plunder, forced labor, and starvation, which led villagers "to think about their relationship with the Communist Party in ways that do not bode well for the continuity of socialist rule."

Often, villagers composed doggerel to show their defiance to the regime, and "perhaps, to remain sane". During the Great Leap, one jingle ran: "Flatter shamelessly—eat delicacies.... Don't flatter—starve to death for sure."

=== Impact on the government ===
Officials were prosecuted for exaggerating production figures, although punishments varied. In one case, a provincial party secretary was dismissed and prohibited from holding higher office. A number of county-level officials were publicly tried and executed.

Mao stepped down as State Chairman of the PRC on 27 April 1959, but remained CCP Chairman. Liu Shaoqi (the new PRC Chairman) and reformist Deng Xiaoping (CCP General Secretary) were left in charge to change policy to bring economic recovery. Mao's Great Leap Forward policy was openly criticized at the Lushan party conference by one person. Criticism from Minister of National Defense Peng Dehuai, who, discovered that people from his home province starved to death caused him to write a letter to Mao to ask for the policies to be adapted. After the Lushan showdown, Mao replaced Peng with Lin Biao and Peng was sent off into obscurity.

However, by 1962, it was clear that the party had changed away from the extremist ideology that led to the Great Leap. During 1962, the party held a number of conferences and rehabilitated most of the deposed comrades who had criticized Mao in the aftermath of the Great Leap. The event was again discussed, with much self-criticism, and the contemporary government called it a "serious [loss] to our country and people" and blamed the cult of personality of Mao.

At the Seven Thousand Cadres Conference in January–February 1962, Mao made a self-criticism and re-affirmed his commitment to democratic centralism. In the years that followed, Mao mostly abstained from the operations of government, making policy largely the domain of Liu Shaoqi and Deng Xiaoping. Maoist ideology took a back seat in the CCP, until Mao launched the Cultural Revolution in 1966 which marked his political comeback.

Following the failures of the Great Leap Forward, Chinese leadership slowed the pace of industrialization, focusing more on the development of China's already more developed coastal areas and the production of consumer goods. Thus, during the preliminary formulation of the Third Five Year Plan (which had been delayed due to the economic turmoil), Liu stated:

In the past, the infrastructure battlefront was too long. There were too many projects. Demands were too high and rushed. Designs were done badly, and projects were hurriedly begun ... We only paid attention to increasing output and ignored quality. We set targets too highly. We must always remember these painful learning experiences.

During the discussion of the Third Five Year Plan, Mao made similar statements about the Great Leap Forward having "extended the infrastructure battlefront too long", acknowledging that it was "best to do less and well".

The failures of the Great Leap Forward also informed the government's approach to the Third Front construction campaign which followed a few years later and which built basic industry and national defense industry in China's interior. Rather than adopting the Great Leap Forward's approach of locally developed projects, the mass mobilizations of the Third Front were centrally planned.

In addition, according to historian Philipp Brigham, the failures of the Great Leap Forward significantly contributed to the Cultural Revolution, which is another pivotal event in modern Chinese politics that happened later in Chairman Mao's regime. Specifically, he posits that one of the main objectives of the Cultural Revolution was to extricate Chairman Mao and the Central Committee of the Chinese Communist Party from the responsibility for the Great Leap Forward. According to Brigham's explanation, Chairman Mao and the central committee tried to incite through the Cultural Revolution that the Great Leap Forward had failed despite the right direction from above due to inadequate leadership of the local cadres.

=== Ecological impact ===
The Great Leap Forward resulted in ecological impacts through deforestation that resulted, as well as the expansion of agriculture into areas ill-suited for it.

=== Health impacts ===
During the Great Leap Forward, the PRC encouraged increased focus on local healthcare. It established hospitals at the commune level, and were financed by a collective welfare fund paid for via work points by the brigades. Medical treatment at these hospitals was free to the individual although medicine still had to be paid for. This increased health care access although it was still beyond the means of many rural people.Dissatisfaction with a health care model that provided more support to urban than rural people increased interest in traditional Chinese medicine, and this interest was also increased by pride in China's intellectual and cultural heritage. In 1958, Mao further encouraged application of traditional Chinese medicine by describing it as a "treasure house" of remedies that must be explored.

The famine greatly damaged the decentralized system of health care. There is evidence that survivors of the famine suffered sustained negative effects to their long-term health and economic outcomes. Those in early childhood during the famine were impacted the most, and it has been estimated that the 1959 birth cohort would have otherwise grown three centimeters taller in adulthood.

Cohorts born during the famine showed higher infant and early life mortality, but exhibit a "mortality crossover" pattern, with mortality rates leveling off or even dropping relative to non-famine cohorts beyond a certain point. This could be explained by the combined effects of initial debilitation, in which malnutrition and hardship increase early deaths, and selection for robustness among famine survivors resulting in fewer later deaths. The famine may have influenced the Chinese leadership's decision to implement the one-child policy.

=== Cultural impact ===
Consistent with the Great Leap Forward in agriculture and industry, authorities promoted the New Folksong Movement and the Peasant Painting Movement, from which hundreds of thousands of new artists emerged. As part of the Peasant Painting Movement, peasant artists decorated village walls with Great Leap Forward-themed murals.

Through the New Folksong Movement, millions of new folk songs and poems were written and collected. Mao announced the New Folksong Movement at the March 1958 Chengdu Conference, describing folk song writing as a form of mass-led literature that would "sprout" communist art by drawing inspiration from rural tradition. Among the major works produced by the movement, and among the major artworks of the Great Leap overall, was Red Flag Ballads, a volume of 300 poems by anonymous artists edited by Guo Moruo and Zhou Yang.

On 9 March 1958, the Ministry of Culture held a meeting to introduce a Great Leap Forward in cinema. During the Great Leap Forward, the film industry rapidly expanded, with documentary films being the genre that experienced the greatest growth. The total number of film-screening venues, including both urban cinemas and mobile projection units which traveled through rural China, radically increased.

The Great Leap Forward also prompted a wave of the New Guohua Campaign in which the state commissioned landscape artists to paint new production projects; select paintings of the campaign were taught in schools, published widely as propaganda posters, exhibited in museums, and used as the backdrops of state events.

The Great Leap Forward included promotion of short form "communist arts and literature," a phrase which in this context emphasized cultural works that could be used or shared outside of traditional venues and formats. These included short dramas that could be performed on the streets or "short short stories" of minimal length.

Art forms like mass murals and cartoons were promoted during the Great Leap Forward, and continued to be a form of art publicized by the state until the early 1980s.

Academics Christine I. Ho and Sigrid Schmalzer write that during the Great Leap Forward, the PRC sought to "promote the kinds of participatory science and art that continue to excite people around the globe but that have rarely, if ever, been pursued so vigorously or on so large a scale."

== See also ==
- Lysenkoism
- Cambodian genocide, known as the "Super Great Leap Forward" by the Khmer Rouge and Pol Pot under the leadership of Angkar
- List of campaigns of the Chinese Communist Party
- Virgin Lands campaign, a contemporaneous program in the Soviet Union

== Bibliography and further reading ==
- Ashton, Basil; Hill, Kenneth; Piazza, Alan; Zeitz, Robin (December 1984). "Famine in China, 1958–61". Population and Development Review. 10 (4): 613–645. doi:10.2307/1973284. JSTOR 1973284.
- Bachman, David (1991). Bureaucracy, Economy, and Leadership in China: The Institutional Origins of the Great Leap Forward. New York: Cambridge University Press.
- Banister, Judith (1987). China's Changing Population. Stanford University Press.
- Becker, Jasper (1996). Hungry ghosts: Mao's secret famine. London: J. Murray. ISBN 978-0-7195-5433-9.
- ——— (1998). Hungry ghosts: Mao's secret famine. New York: Holt. ISBN 978-0-8050-5668-6.
- Chang, Jung; Halliday, Jon (2005). Mao: The Unknown Story. New York: Knopf. ISBN 978-0-679-42271-6.
- Chen, Lingchei Letty (2020). The Great Leap Backward: Forgetting and Representing the Mao Years. Amherst, NY: Cambria. ISBN 9781604979923.
- Chen, Yulu; Guo, Qingwang (2016). Major issues and policies in China's financial reform. Vol. 1. Hong Kong: Enrich Professional Publishing. ISBN 978-1623200695.
- ———; ——— (2017). Major issues and policies in China's financial reform. Vol. 2. Honolulu: Enrich Professional Publishing. ISBN 978-1623200725.
- Coale, Ansley J. (1984). Rapid Population Change in China, 1952–1982. Washington, D.C.: National Academy Press.
- Courtois, Stéphane; Kramer, Mark, eds. (2004). The black book of communism: crimes, terror, repression (5th ed.). Cambridge, MA: Harvard University Press. pp. 463–546. ISBN 978-0-674-07608-2.
- Dikötter, Frank (2010). Mao's Great Famine: The History of China's Most Devastating Catastrophe, 1958–62. Walker. ISBN 978-0-8027-7768-3.
- Gao, Mobo C. F. (2007). Gao village: rural life in modern China. Honolulu: University of Hawaiʻi Press. ISBN 978-0-8248-3192-9.
- ——— (2008). The battle for China's past: Mao and the Cultural Revolution. London: Pluto. ISBN 978-0-7453-2780-8.
- Harrell, Stevan (2023). An Ecological History of Modern China. Seattle: University of Washington Press. ISBN 978-0295751719.
- Hinton, William (1984). Shenfan: The Continuing Revolution in a Chinese Village. New York: Vintage. ISBN 978-0-394-72378-5.
- Hou, Li (2021). Building for Oil: Daqing and the Formation of the Chinese Socialist State. Harvard-Yenching Institute monograph series. Cambridge, MA: Harvard University Asia Center. ISBN 978-0-674-26022-1.
- Houser, D.; Sands, B.; Xiao, E. (February 2009). "Three parts natural, seven parts man-made: Bayesian analysis of China's Great Leap Forward demographic disaster". Journal of Economic Behavior & Organization. 69 (2): 148–159. doi:10.1016/j.jebo.2007.09.008.
- Karl, Rebecca E. (2010). Mao Zedong and China in the twentieth-century world: a concise history. Durham, NC: Duke University Press. ISBN 978-0-8223-4780-4.
- Kim, Seonghoon; Fleisher, Belton; Sun, Jessica Ya (2007). "The Long-term Health Effects of Fetal Malnutrition: Evidence from the 1959–1961 China Great Leap Forward Famine". Health Economics. 26 (10): 1264–1277. doi:10.1002/hec.3397. PMID 27539791.
- Lardy, R. Nicholas (1987). "The Chinese economy under stress, 1958–1965". In MacFarquhar, Roderick; Fairbank, John K. (eds.). The People's Republic, Part 1: The Emergence of Revolutionary China 1949–1965. Cambridge University Press. pp. 360–397. doi:10.1017/CHOL9780521243360.009. ISBN 978-0-521-24336-0.
- Li, Minqi (2008). The rise of China and the demise of the capitalist world-economy. New York: Monthly Review Press. ISBN 978-1-58367-182-5.
- Li, Wei; Yang, Dennis Tao (2005). "The Great Leap Forward: Anatomy of a Central Planning Disaster". Journal of Political Economy. 113 (4): 840–877. doi:10.1086/430804. SSRN 772079. "[alternate site]" (PDF). Archived (PDF) from the original on 30 August 2006 – via faculty.darden.virginia.edu.
- Lieberthal, Kenneth (1987). "The Great Leap Forward and the split in the Yenan leadership". The People's Republic, Part 1: The Emergence of Revolutionary China, 1949–1965. The Cambridge History of China. Vol. 14. Cambridge University Press. p. 301. ISBN 978-0-521-24336-0. Archived from the original on 12 March 2012.
- Lieberthal, Kenneth (2003). Governing China: From Revolution Through Reform (2nd ed.). W. W. Norton. ISBN 0-393-92492-0.
- Meyskens, Covell F. (2020). Mao's Third Front: The Militarization of Cold War China. Cambridge University Press. doi:10.1017/9781108784788. ISBN 978-1-108-78478-8.
- Peng, Xizhe (1987). "Demographic consequences of the Great Leap Forward in China's Provinces" (PDF). Population and Development Review. 13 (4): 639–670. doi:10.2307/1973026. JSTOR 1973026. Archived from the original (PDF) on 6 March 2019.
- Perkins, Dwight (1991). "Chapter 6: China's Economic Policy and Performance". In Roderick MacFarquhar; John K. Fairbank (eds.). The Cambridge History of China. Vol. 15. The People’s Republic, Part 2: Revolutions within the Chinese Revolution 1966-1982. Cambridge University Press. pp. 475–530.
- Qian, Ying (2024). Revolutionary Becomings: Documentary Media in Twentieth-Century China. New York: Columbia University Press. ISBN 9780231204477.
- Rummel, R. J. (1991). China's bloody century: genocide and mass murder since 1900. New Brunswick: Transaction. ISBN 9780887384172.
- Sansan and Lord, Bette Bao (1964). Eighth Moon: The True Story of a Young Girl's Life in Communist China. New York: Harper & Row.
- Shen, Zhihua; Xia, Yafeng (November 2011). "The Great Leap Forward, the People's Commune and the Sino-Soviet Split". Journal of Contemporary China. 20 (72): 861–880. doi:10.1080/10670564.2011.604505.
- Short, Philip (2001). Mao: A Life. New York: Holt. ISBN 978-0-8050-6638-8.
- Smith, S. A. (2015). "Redemptive Religious Societies and the Communist State, 1949 to the 1980s". In Brown, Jeremy; Johnson, Matthew D. (eds.). Maoism at the Grassroots: Everyday Life in China's Era of High Socialism. Cambridge, MA: Harvard University Press. pp. 340–364. ISBN 978-0674287204.
- Yang, Dennis Tao (2008). "China's Agricultural Crisis and Famine of 1959–1961: A Survey and Comparison to Soviet Famines". Comparative Economic Studies. 50 (1): 1–29. doi:10.1057/ces.2008.4.
- Thaxton, Ralph A. Jr. (2008). Catastrophe and contention in rural China: Mao's Great Leap Forwards famine and the origins of righteous resistance in Da Fo Village. Cambridge University Press. ISBN 978-0-521-72230-8.
- Thornton, Patricia M. (2019). "Cultural Revolution". In Sorace, Christian; Franceschini, Ivan; Loubere, Nicholas (eds.). Afterlives of Chinese Communism: Political Concepts from Mao to Xi. Acton: Australian National University Press. ISBN 9781760462499.
- Valentino, Benjamin A. (2004). Final Solutions: Mass Killing and Genocide in the Twentieth Century. Cornell University Press. ISBN 0-8014-3965-5.
- Vukovich, Daniel (2013). China and Orientalism: Western Knowledge Production and the PRC. Routledge. ISBN 978-1-136-50593-5.
- Wertheim, Willem Frederik (1997). Third World whence and whither? Protective State versus aggressive market. Amsterdam: Het Spinhuis. ISBN 978-9-055-89082-8.
- Wheelwright, E. L.; McFarlane, Bruce. The Chinese Road to Socialism: Economics of the Cultural Revolution.
- Cai Xiang (蔡翔); Karl, Rebecca E.; Zhong Xueping (钟雪萍) (2016). Revolution and its narratives: China's socialist literary and cultural imaginaries (1949–1966). Durham, NC: Duke University Press. ISBN 978-0-8223-7461-9.
- Yang, Dali L. (1996). Calamity and Reform in China: State, Rural Society, and Institutional Change since the Great Leap Famine. Stanford University Press.
- Yang, Jisheng (2008). 墓碑：中國六十年代大飢荒紀實 [Tombstone: an account of Chinese famine in the 1960s] (in Chinese). Hong Kong: Cosmos. ISBN 978-988-211-908-6.
- ——— (2010). "The Fatal Politics of the PRC's Great Leap Famine: The Preface to Tombstone". Journal of Contemporary China. 19 (66): 755–776. doi:10.1080/10670564.2010.485408.
- ——— (2012). Tombstone: the great Chinese famine, 1958-1962. New York: Farrar, Straus & Giroux. ISBN 9780374277932.
- ——— (2012k). Tombstone: the great Chinese famine, 1958-1962 (Kindle ed.). New York: Farrar, Straus & Giroux. ISBN 978-1466827790.
