= Counterattack the Right-Deviationist Reversal-of-Verdicts Trend =

1975 political campaign by Mao Zedong against Deng Xiaoping

Counterattack the Right-Deviationist Reversal-of-Verdicts Trend (反击右倾翻案风), later known as Criticize Deng, Counterattack the Right-Deviationist Reversal-of-Verdicts Trend (批邓、反击右倾翻案风), was a Chinese political campaign launched by The Gang Of Four in November 1975 against Deng Xiaoping's anti-Cultural Revolution program. It was one of the last movements during the Cultural Revolution, and continued briefly under Hua Guofeng after Mao's 1976 death, before it officially ended with Deng's rehabilitation in July 1977.

The movement was openly repudiated during the 3rd plenary session of the 11th Central Committee of the Chinese Communist Party in December 1978.

== See also ==
- Anti-Right Deviation Struggle
- List of campaigns of the Chinese Communist Party
