= Three Red Banners =

Chinese communist ideological slogan

- Traditional Chinese: 三面紅旗
- Simplified Chinese: 三面红旗
- Literal meaning: three red banners
Transcriptions
Standard Mandarin
- Hanyu Pinyin: sānmiàn hóngqí

Three Red Banners (Chinese: 三面红旗) was an ideological slogan in the late 1950s which called on the Chinese people to build a socialist state. The "Three Red Banners" also called the "Three Red Flags," consisted of the General Line for socialist construction, the Great Leap Forward and the people's communes.

After the first Five-Year Plan, the People's Republic of China continued its socialist construction by introducing "Three Red Banners Movement". The General Line directed the Chinese people to "go all out, aim high, and build socialism with greater, faster, better, and more economical results." By the end of 1958, nearly all Chinese peasants had been organized into communes averaging 5000 households each. All privately owned property was taken for or contributed to the communes and people were not allowed to cook their own food and instead ate in communal dining halls.

The Great Leap Forward, begun in 1958, was a campaign to rapidly modernize by using China's vast labor resources in agricultural and industrial projects. The Leap instead resulted in economic destruction and tens of millions of famine deaths, and had been mostly abandoned by early 1962. Membership in communes was gradually reduced in the early 1960s, with some private property ownership and enterprise again being allowed. The communes continued until being dismantled in the early 1980s under Deng Xiaoping.
