= Li Rui =

Chinese politician (1917–2019)

- 李锐
- Studio portrait, 1947

Member of the 12th Central Committee of the Chinese Communist Party
- In office 1982–1987

Deputy Head of the Organisation Department of the Chinese Communist Party
- In office 1982–1984

Vice Minister of Water Resources
- In office 1958–1958

Personal details
- Born: 14 April 1917 Pingjiang County, Hunan, China
- Died: 16 February 2019 (aged 101) Beijing, China
- Resting place: Babaoshan Revolutionary Cemetery
- Party: CCP
- Spouses: Fan Yuanzhen (范元甄) (m. 1939–1944) (m. 1945–1962); Zhang Yuzhen (张玉珍) (m. 1979)
- Children: 3
- Education: Wuhan University
- Occupation: Revolutionary, politician, historian

Chinese name
- Traditional Chinese: 李銳
- Simplified Chinese: 李锐
Transcriptions
Standard Mandarin
- Hanyu Pinyin: Lǐ Ruì
- IPA: [lì ɻwêɪ]

Li Rui (simplified Chinese: 李锐; traditional Chinese: 李銳; pinyin: Lǐ Ruì; 14 April 1917 – 16 February 2019) was a Chinese politician, historian and dissident Chinese Communist Party (CCP) member.

As a young student activist, Li joined the Communists in 1937 during the Chinese Civil War. By 1958, he had become the vice-minister of the Ministry of Water Resources. His vocal opposition to the proposed Three Gorges Dam brought him to the attention of the Chairman of the CCP, Mao Zedong. Li impressed Mao, who made him his personal secretary for industrial affairs. However, Li was known for his independence of thought, and defied Mao at the 1959 Lushan Conference. Li was expelled from the party and sent to a prison camp, beginning nearly twenty years of political exile. Denounced by his family for anti-Mao activities during the Great Leap Forward and Cultural Revolution, he spent eight years in solitary confinement at the Qincheng Prison.

After Mao's death, Li's party membership was restored. He regained an influential position in the CCP but, after only a few years, was forced to resign by Chen Yun for getting too close to Hu Yaobang. From the mid-1980s, shut out of formal power, Li wrote and commentated extensively, calling for freedom of speech, freedom of the press, and democracy within a socialist framework. He also wrote five books on Mao and early Communist Party history. Li remained a party member until his death, respected but isolated; his views were formally denounced and he was censored in the Chinese press. Li died in 2019, aged 101. He was described by The Guardian in 2005 as living a life "filled with rebellions, often at great personal cost, against those who abused their power".

== Early life ==
Li Rui was born Li Housheng (李厚生) in Pingjiang County, Hunan Province, in April 1917, to a wealthy family. His father had been a member of the Tongmenghui, an anti-imperial revolutionary party. Li's father died in 1922, when Li was only five. As a high schooler living in Hubei, Li protested against warlordism. In 1934, he enrolled in Wuhan University, studying mechanical engineering. In 1935, he helped lead a student protest against the failure of the Chinese government to oppose Japanese aggression.

== Political career ==
=== Young Communist activist ===
Li secretly joined the Chinese Communist Party in February 1937. A dedicated activist, he was briefly jailed by the Republic of China's Kuomintang government for communist activities. Li trekked on foot to the Communist base in Yan'an in the late 1930s, a journey of approximately 1,000 kilometres (620 mi) – upon his departure from home, his mother told him, "The Communists are good, but you might get killed".

From December 1939, he led the propaganda branch of the party's Central Youth Working Committee. Li and his first wife, Fan Yuanzhen (范元甄), were married the same month. He became the editor of domestic commentary for the Jiefang Daily (解放日报) in September 1941 and later the newspaper's head of the editorial bureau for areas under Communist control. He also served as a secretary to Chen Yun, who would later be an architect of the reform and opening up under Deng Xiaoping. Li co-founded another newspaper, Qingqidui (轻骑队), which satirised the Communist leadership, resulting in his imprisonment from 1943 to 1944 as a suspected spy during the rectification campaign. During his imprisonment, Li and his wife were briefly divorced, separating in June 1944 and remarrying in June 1945. They had two daughters and a son; their son, the eldest, was born in 1946.

In 1945, Li was made the secretary to Gao Gang, the head of the Northeastern bureau of the CCP, a post which Li held until 1947. In October 1952, after the Communist victory in the Chinese Civil War, Li joined the Ministry of Water Resources. By 1958, he had risen to become its deputy head, the youngest vice-minister in China. He attracted the attention of China's leader, Mao Zedong, through his passionate opposition to the proposed Three Gorges Dam on the Yangtze River. Mao invited Li to Nanning to argue on the issue, and was impressed by his zeal and intelligence. Many years later, Li's personality was described as "blunt, brash, and quick-witted" in The New York Times' obituary. Although Li supported the use of hydropower over coal power, he warned that a large dam on the Yangtze would lead to cost overruns and organisational conundrums. Li reported to Mao that the dam would do little to solve downstream flooding, as many large tributaries enter the Yangtze after the planned dam location. He successfully persuaded Mao to postpone the start of the project.

=== Secretary for Mao, labour camp and exile ===
Mao hired Li as his personal secretary for industrial affairs in 1958, but Li's criticisms of the Great Leap Forward and support for Peng Dehuai soon became an issue. At a 1959 meeting in Lushan, Li insisted on opposing Mao's views. Li later declared that Mao was dismissive of the suffering caused by his policies, "Mao's way of thinking and governing was terrifying. He put no value on human life. The deaths of others meant nothing to him".

Li was denounced as an anti-Mao conspirator and sent to a penal camp in Heilongjiang near the border with the Soviet Union. He came close to starving, but was saved by a transfer to a more survivable camp arranged by outside friends. Stripped of his Communist Party membership, Li was offered early release if he was willing to renounce his criticisms of Mao, but declined to do so. Released in 1961, Li returned to Beijing. After nearly 22 years of marriage, his wife, Fan, denounced him and divorced him again, this time for good. In December 1962, he was internally exiled to the Mozitan Hydropower Station in the Dabie Mountains of Anhui's Huoshan County, where he worked as an instructor, teaching basic education classes to the station's workers while also doing manual labor.

In 1966, Mao's Cultural Revolution began, and Li was asked to denounce his old colleagues among Mao's private secretaries. He refused to do so except in the case of Chen Boda, the most left-wing. For this, he was imprisoned in solitary confinement at the Qincheng Prison. Li maintained his grip on sanity by writing poetry in the margins of Communist books using gentian violet pilfered from the prison's medical facilities. He was released on 30 May 1975 and sent back to Mozitan as a laborer, remaining there until his rehabilitation in 1979.

=== Return to prominence ===
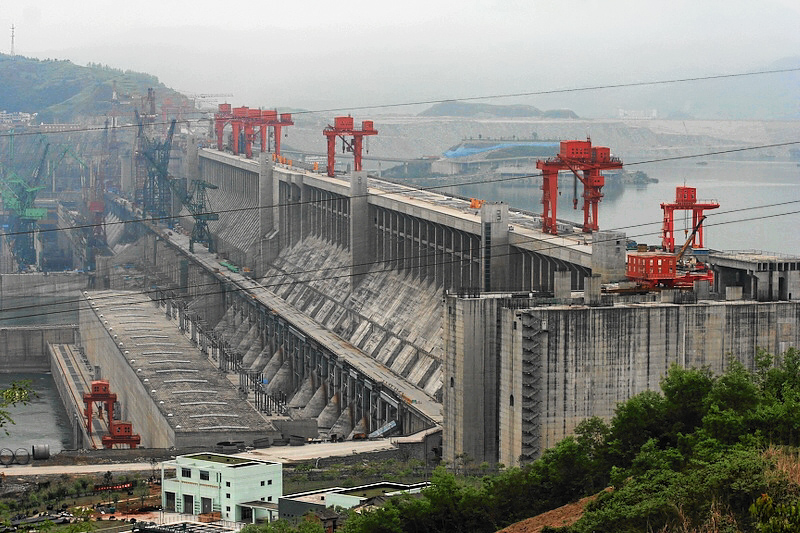
Throughout the 1980s, Li opposed the construction of the Three Gorges Dam (pictured in 2006)

After Mao's death in 1976 and the emergence of Deng Xiaoping, Li regained his CCP membership. In 1979, he became vice-minister of the Ministry of Electric Industry, serving for three years. The same year, Li remarried; his second wife (and later widow) was Zhang Yuzhen (张玉珍). In 1982, he was elected to the Central Committee for a five-year term, and in April of the same year he became vice director of the Organisation Department of the CCP, an influential role focused on the promotion, demotion, and recruitment of senior officials. He was appointed by Chen Yun to counter the influence of Hu Yaobang. He was also head of the Youth Bureau. As a Youth Bureau official, Li sent Yan Huai on an inspection trip to find promising young officials; Li specifically asked Yan to prepare a report on Xi Jinping, a local official in Hebei at the time.

In 1983, under the direction of Song Renqiong and Xi Zhongxun, Li helped lead the second official investigation into the Guangxi Massacre. On 3 March 1984, he gathered offspring of senior officials, asking them whether a special document on them was necessary. The participants opposed such a document, which he agreed to, adding that he hoped that offsprings "will fight to excel". in the same year, four individuals, including Deng Liqun and Li Rui’s ex-wife, wrote letters to Chen Yun complaining about Li. Chen removed him for getting close to Hu Yaobang, who Chen intentioned Li would counter. Li's dismissal was opposed by Xi Zhongxun, but he could not change Chen's decision.

Soon after his dismissal, Li visited Hebei, where he meet with Xi Jinping; Xi was the only young official Li met in Hebei. The two had a long discussion about why CCP committees should be smaller and the separation of the Party and the state. Li, whose opposition to the Three Gorges Dam had played a major role in his earlier career, continued to fight against construction of the dam throughout the 1980s, working with environmentalist Dai Qing. Their efforts were unsuccessful and the dam was approved in 1992, construction finishing in 2006. In 1989, Li personally witnessed the violent crackdown in the Muxidi neighborhood of Beijing during the Tiananmen Square protests, strengthening his opposition to the party's authoritarian wing. He was an ally of prominent reformists such as Zhao Ziyang and Hu Yaobang.

== Party elder, historian and dissident ==
Whenever there's a clash between the party and humanity, I insist on humanity.

— Li Rui, interviewed by the BBC at age 100 in 2017

After officially retiring in June 1995 at age 78, Li became known as a party elder and historian of Mao, writing five works on Mao's life. His writings did not hesitate to criticise Mao or contemporary party leaders. Considered the "veteran liberal member" of the CCP, according to The Economist, Li argued for free speech, freedom of the press, and democracy within a socialist framework. In November 2004, the party's Propaganda Department banned Li from being published in the media. His books on Mao were censored and banned in Mainland China. Described as a thorn in the side of the Communist Party's autocratic leaders (his personal name, Rui 锐, means 'sharp' in Chinese), his views were secretly but officially denounced as subversive in 2013.

Li served as the most senior adviser to Yanhuang Chunqiu, a monthly history journal founded in 1991 by Du Daozheng, a former head of China's press and publications regulator. The journal published material on subjects not usually covered in Chinese media, including the Great Leap Forward and the Cultural Revolution. The New York Times called Li its "patron saint". In 2014, oversight of the journal passed to the Chinese National Academy of Arts, a state body affiliated with the Ministry of Culture. In 2016, the National Academy removed Du as publisher. The new management courted more hardline writers, one of whom called for Du and Li to be expelled from the party. Wu Si, a former chief editor of the journal, later said that protecting it had been beyond the ability of Li or any one person.

Before every quinquennial Communist Party congress, Li wrote to fellow senior party members, advocating political reform. At the 16th Party Congress in 2002, Li introduced a proposal aimed at newly elected Party general secretary Hu Jintao on political reform of the Communist Party. Li argued that constitutionalism and democratisation would lead the Communist Party away from political mishaps such as the Anti-Rightist Movement, the Great Leap Forward and the Cultural Revolution. In 2006, he was a lead signatory to an open letter condemning the state's closure of the investigative newspaper Freezing Point (冰点). Ahead of the 17th Communist Party Congress in 2007, Li and retired academic Xie Tao published articles calling for the Communist Party to become a European-style socialist party, remarks that were condemned by the party propaganda apparatus. In October 2010, Li was the lead signatory to an open letter to the Standing Committee of the National People's Congress, calling for greater press freedom. In 2017, he failed to attend the 19th Party Congress, which was seen as an act of defiance against General Secretary Xi Jinping's elevation above collective leadership.

== Death and funeral ==
Li, during hospitalisation in April 2018, criticizing Xi Jinping: "He only has elementary school education."

As he aged, Li retained his mental sharpness. In spite of his political views, he was allowed to keep his privileges as a senior CCP member, such as better medical treatment and his apartment in Minister's House, a building reserved for venerated party retirees. Having devoted his life to the Communist Party, Li never considered leaving it. He wrote that when readmitted to the party in the 1970s, he had hoped that it had changed, but was disappointed, and criticized its "arrogance, ignorance, shamelessness, lawlessness".

Li died of organ failure in Beijing on 16 February 2019, aged 101. As an early and senior member of the Communist Party, Li was given a state funeral and buried at the Babaoshan Revolutionary Cemetery, despite his desire to be interred with his parents in Hunan, his home province. News of his death was limited by official censorship and, according to the South China Morning Post, his funeral was "conducted with secrecy and security". Despite the restrictions, the funeral attracted hundreds of mourners, ranging from ordinary Chinese citizens to those few still living among his old colleagues and fellow revolutionaries. Notwithstanding his fervent opposition to their policies, both of China's leaders, General Secretary Xi Jinping and Premier Li Keqiang, sent wreaths.

=== Diary court case ===
Li began keeping a diary in 1938, but his wartime diaries were lost; his extensive surviving diary runs from 1946 to his last entry in March 2018, with entries made almost every day. The diary, along with Li's other papers, was the subject of a lawsuit in 2019. Li's widow, Zhang, and daughter, Li Nanyang, both claimed ownership over the diary; Zhang wished it to be returned to China. Li's daughter Li Nanyang had donated the diary to the Hoover Institution in the American state of California. A Beijing court ruled in favor of Zhang in 2019, but the case continued in the United States, and went to trial in 2024. Zhang's lawyers argued that the diary is personal to her and that she only wished the return of the original document, not any copies retained by Hoover; Li Nanyang's attorneys suggested that the Chinese government was behind Zhang's case, given her limited financial means. Zhang died during proceedings; a federal judge ruled in 2026 that the donation to Stanford was legal and had been carried out "in accordance with Li's wishes." The court also found that the Beijing ruling was unenforceable in the United States, resulting in the Hoover Institution retaining control over the diary and other documents.

== Selected publications ==
- (1989) Lushan Huiyi Shilu, (庐山 会议 实录) English translation of title: Records of the Lushan Conference, ISBN 7506901994
- (1998), Li Rui Ri Ji, Chu Fang Juan (李锐日记. 出访卷) English translation of title: The Diary of Li Rui, Visiting Papers, ISBN 7506314975
- (1998), Zhi Yan: Li Rui Liu Shi Nian Di You Yu Si, (直言: 李锐六十年的忧与思) English translation of title: To Put It Bluntly: Li Rui's Sixty Years of Worries and Thoughts, ISBN 978-7507209440
- (1998), Li Rui Shi Wen Zi Xuan Ji, (李锐诗文自选集) English translation of title: Collection of Poems, ISBN 7505931369
- (1999) Li Rui Wen Ji. Juan 1, Lushan Hui Yi Zhen Mian Mu, (李锐文集. 卷一, 庐山会议真面目) English translation of title: The Collected Works of Li Rui, Volume One: The True Faces of the Lushan Conference, ISBN 7806096736
- (1999) Li Rui Wen Ji. Juan 2, Mao Zedong Di Wan Nian Bei Ju, (李锐文集. 卷二, 毛泽东的晚年悲剧) English translation of title: The Collected Works of Li Rui, Volume Two: The Tragedy of Mao Zedong's Later Years, ISBN 7806096736
- (1999) Li Rui Wen Ji. Juan 3, "Da Yue Jin" Qin Li Ji, (李锐文集. 卷三, 《大跃进》亲历记) English translation of title: The Collected Works of Li Rui, Volume Three: My Experience of "The Great Leap Forward", ISBN 7806096736
- (2005) Li Rui Tan Mao Ze Dong, (李锐谈毛泽东) English translation of title: Li Rui on Mao Zedong, ISBN 988-98282-2-7
- (2009) San Shi Sui Yi Qian De Mao Ze Dong, (三十岁以前的毛泽东) English translation of title: Mao Zedong Before The Age of Thirty, ISBN 978-7218015767
- (2013) Li Rui Koushu Wangshi (李銳口述往事) English translation of title: Li Rui's Dictations of the Past, ISBN 978-9881609793
- (2014) Mao Zedong: Zheng Rong Sui Yue (1893–1923), (毛泽东 : 峥嵘岁月 (1893–1923)) English translation of title: Mao Zedong: Prosperous Years (1893–1923), ISBN 7550220581
- (2015) Mao Ze Dong Zao Nian Du Shu Sheng Huo, (毛泽东早年读书生活) English translation of title: Mao Zedong's Early Reading Life, ISBN 7547033822
