= Maotanchang =

Town in Lu'an, Anhui, China

Maotanchang, or Maotanchangzhen (simplified Chinese: 毛坦厂镇; traditional Chinese: 毛坦廠鎮; pinyin: Máo Tǎn Chǎng Zhèn) is a town located in the south of Jin'an District, Lu'an, Anhui. It is at the junction of Huoshan County, Shucheng County and Jin'an District. It has an area of 59.1 square kilometers. There are 18,000 people in Maotanchang. Maotanchang High School is located in Maotanchang.

Maotanchang is divided into the following:

- Maotanchang Subdistrict Village
- Bajiaotang Village
- Jinyan Village
- Qingshanyan Village
- Lijiachong Village
- Dongshisun Village
- Dashanzhai Village

== Middle school ==
The Maotanchang Middle School is prized by many parents across China, because of the exigence and work offered to students in preparation of China's national test, the Gaokao. With approximately 80% of local students reaching the required grade in the examination, many families come in to prepare their children: it is estimated that at the end of August, 50,000 people move in the city, before departing as soon as the Gaokao ends. The school is the main economic force of the city, raising its annual income to 2.45 million USD. However, some students have criticized the physical punishments of some teachers or the pressure driving certain students to suicide.
