= Maotanchang High School =

Maotanchang High School of Anhui Lu An
- 毛坦厂中学

Location
- China; 31.35°N 116.5594°E

Maotanchang High School of Anhui Lu An is a high school in Maotanchang Subdistrict Village, Maotanchang Town, Jin'an District, Lu'an, Anhui, China. It is known as the largest 'Factory of Gaokao' and is famous for its industrial model of education, which caused a great deal of dispute about education in China. The school insists on the methods of 'manufacturing students' mind for exam', which means that the students are trained by intensive exercises and homework to obtain a good grade in the competitive Gaokao.
