= Zhu Bofang =

Chinese engineer (1928–2024)

- 朱伯芳
- Born: 17 October 1928; Yujiang County, Jiangxi, China
- Died: 4 February 2024 (aged 95); Beijing, China
- Education: Jiaotong University (now Tongji University)
- Scientific career
- Fields: Hydraulic structure
- Workplaces: China No. 11 Water Conservancy and Water Power Engineering Bureau; China Institute of Water Resources and Hydropower Research

Zhu Bofang (Chinese: 朱伯芳; pinyin: Zhū Bófāng; 17 October 1928 – 4 February 2024) was a Chinese hydraulic structure engineer, and an academician of the Chinese Academy of Engineering.

Zhu was a member of the 8th and 9th National Committee of the Chinese People's Political Consultative Conference.

== Biography ==
Zhu was born in Yujiang County, Jiangxi, on 17 October 1928. His grandfather Zhu Jichun (朱际春) was a xiucai (秀才; 'outstanding talent') during the Qing dynasty (1644–1911). His father Zhu Zuming (朱祖明) graduated from National Beiping University and became a teacher worked successively at Jiangxi Provincial Highway Bureau, Yujiang County High School, Jiangxi Provincial Agricultural College, Nanchang University, and Wuhan University of Water and Electricity. He attended the Yujiang County No. 3 Primary School, Yujiang County No. 1 Primary School, Jiangxi Provincial Jiujiang Middle School, and Yujiang County High School. Due to the invasion of Jiangxi by the Imperial Japanese Army, he repeatedly dropped out of school and stayed at home. In July 1948, he was admitted to Jiaotong University (now Tongji University) with the highest score in English. In August 1949, introduced by underground party member Liu Dujing (刘笃敬), he joined the Communist Youth League of China.

In September 1951, he became a technician at Anhui Foziling Reservoir Project Command Headquarters (安徽佛子岭水库工程指挥部). In July 1952, with the nationwide adjustment of college and university departments, the Civil Engineering Department of Jiaotong University was relocated to Tongji University. In September, he received his graduation certificate from Tongji University. He became an engineer at the Anhui Meishan Reservoir Project Command Headquarters (安徽梅山水库工程指挥部) in May 1954 and subsequently leader of Dam Engineering Team at the Design Institute of the Huai River Control Committee of the Ministry of Water Resources (水利部治淮委员会设计院坝工组) in September 1955. In November 1957, he was transferred to became engineer and team leader of the Structural Materials Research Institute of the Water Resources and Hydropower Research Institute of the Ministry of Water Resources and Electric Power (水利电力部水利水电科学研究院结构材料研究所), he remained in that position until November 1968, when he was made engineer and project leader of the Survey, Design and Research Brigade of the China No. 11 Water Conservancy and Water Power Engineering Bureau (水利电力部第十一工程局勘测设计研究大队). In 1971, he participated in the reconstruction of the Sanmenxia Dam. In 1978, he served as a professor level senior engineer at the China Academy of Water Resources and Hydropower Sciences (中国水利水电科学研究院).

On 4 February 2024, he died in Beijing, at the age of 95.

== Honours and awards ==
- 1982 State Natural Science Award (Third Class) for the Research on Temperature Stress of Hydraulic Concrete
- 1988 State Science and Technology Progress Award (Second Class) for the optimization methods, programs, and applications for arch dams
- 1995 Member of the Chinese Academy of Engineering (CAE)
- 2001 State Science and Technology Progress Award (Second Class) for the advanced simulation analysis of concrete and research on temperature stress
