= Yu'an, Lu'an =

Yu'an 裕安区
- District
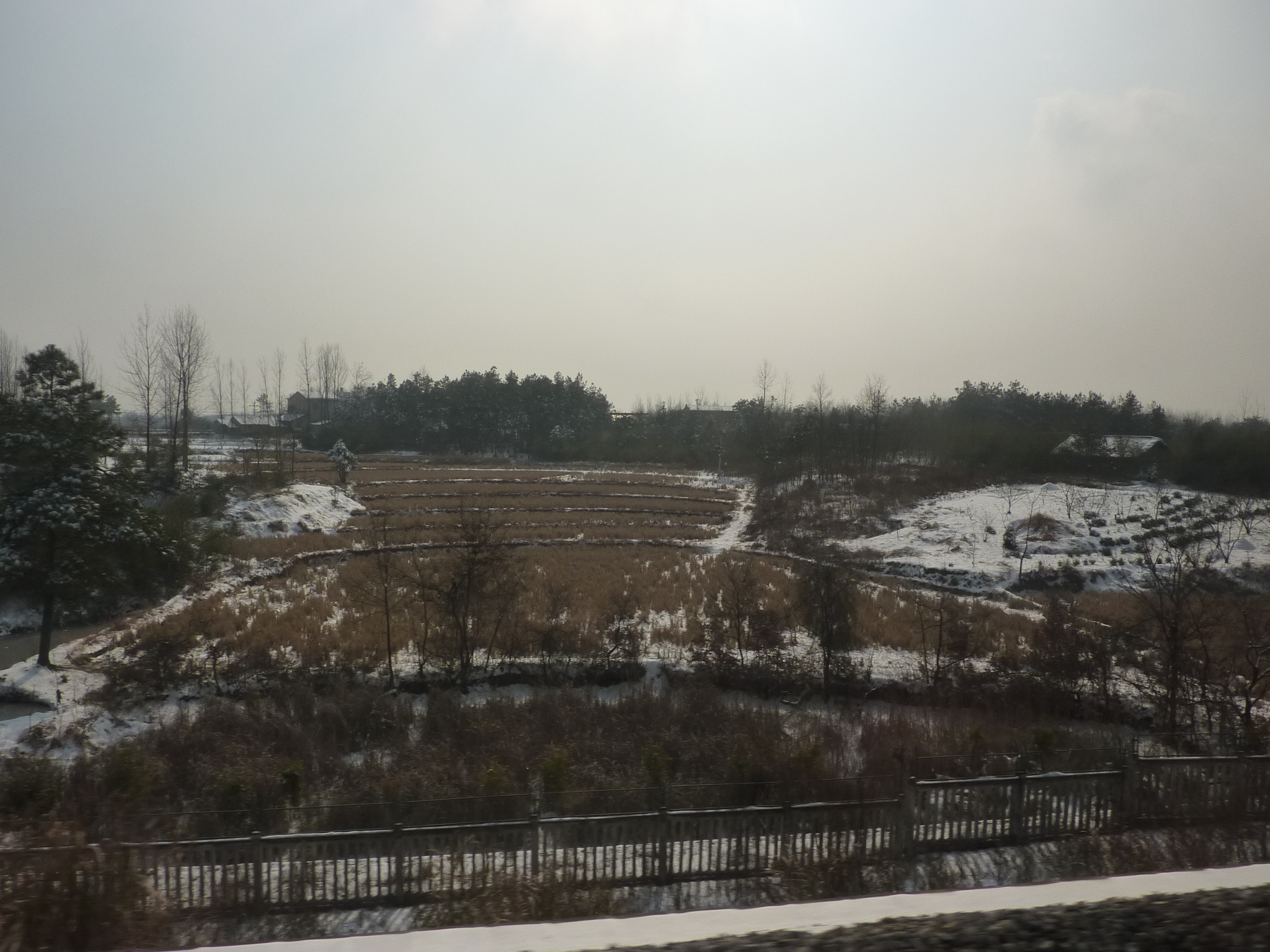
- Yu'an District rural landscape (as seen from the Hewu Railway)
- Interactive map of Yu'an
- Coordinates: 31°44′16″N 116°28′48″E
- Country: People's Republic of China
- Province: Anhui
- Prefecture-level city: Lu'an

Area
  - Total: 1,926 km^{2} (744 sq mi)

Population (2017)
  - Total: 905,000
  - Density: 470/km^{2} (1,220/sq mi)
- Time zone: UTC+8 (China Standard)
- Postal code: 237010

Yu'an District (simplified Chinese: 裕安区; traditional Chinese: 裕安區; pinyin: Yù'ān Qū) is a district of the city of Lu'an, Anhui Province, People's Republic of China. It has a population of 930,000 and an area of 1,526 square kilometres (589 sq mi). The government of Yu'an District is located in Yunlu Street.

== Administrative divisions ==
In the present, Yu'an District has 3 subdistricts, 12 towns and 6 townships.

3 Subdistricts

- Gulou (鼓楼街道)
- Xishi (西市街道)
- Xiaohuashan (小华山街道)

12 Towns

- Subu (苏埠镇)
- Hanbaidu (韩摆渡镇)
- Xin'an (新安镇)
- Shunhe (顺河镇)
- Shipozhuang (石婆庄镇)
- Dushan (独山镇)
- Chengnan (城南镇)
- Dingji (丁集镇)
- Guzhen (固镇镇)
- Xuji (徐集镇)
- Fenlukou (分路口镇)
- Jiangjiadian (江家店镇)

6 Townships

- Danwang (单王乡)
- Qingshan (青山乡)
- Shibanchong (石板冲乡)
- Xihekou (西河口乡)
- Pingqiao (平桥乡)
- Luoji (罗集乡)
