= Qiangguo Forum =

Chinese Internet forum

The Qiangguo Forum (Chinese: 强国论坛; pinyin: qiángguó lùntán; lit. 'strong country forum') is a Chinese bulletin board on the website of the People's Daily, the official newspaper of the Central Committee of the Chinese Communist Party.

== History ==
With politically sensitive issues such as the July 1, 2003 demonstrations in Hong Kong against Hong Kong Basic Law Article 23, the amount of coverage and analysis within the forum is often more extensive than with the paper itself.

After Zhao Ziyang's death on January 17, 2005, the forum was flooded with messages expressing condolence. These messages were promptly deleted by the moderators, as the government feared any mass mourning for the purged leader would cause civil unrest, and some posters responded by ridiculing the moderators. One person asked: "I could post messages in the morning, but why not in the evening?"

== Content ==
The purpose of the forum is for discussion on how to make China a stronger nation. The forum is somewhat remarkable being sponsored by an organ of the Chinese Communist Party yet having a relatively open amount of uninhibited discussion including sometimes extremely strong criticism of the People's Republic of China government. Scholars of the Chinese internet such as Peng Lan, argue that its creation to mobilize internet resistance to the bombing of the Chinese embassy in Belgrade was a landmark moment in Chinese internet history, and the forum has been cited as being important in the development of online Chinese nationalism.

== See also ==
- Internet in the People's Republic of China
- Global Times
- Media in China
- Communications in China
