= Du Daozheng =

Chinese journalist

Du Daozheng (Simplified Chinese: 杜导正; né Yuzhi 毓芷; born September 22, 1923) is a Chinese journalist who served as the head of National Press and Publication Administration in China and the founding director of the liberal journal Yanhuang Chunqiu. He was also the editor-in-chief of Guangming Daily and Yangcheng Evening News.

== Biography ==
Du was born in 1923 in Dingxiang County, Shanxi, China. He joined the Chinese Communist Party (CCP) in 1937.

After the establishment of the People's Republic of China in 1949, he served as the branch director of the Xinhua News Agency in Hebei, and then in Guangdong. He later became the chief editor of the Yangcheng Evening News.

After the Cultural Revolution, Du served as the editor-in-chief of Guangming Daily during the first phase of the Reforms and Opening-up, which was launched by Deng Xiaoping and other reformists within CCP. In 1987, Du became the head of China's National Press and Publication Administration. Under Hu Yaobang and Zhao Ziyang, the liberal General Secretaries of CCP in the 1980s, media freedoms reached their height at that time.

However, Zhao was ousted and detained amid the crackdown of Tiananmen protests in 1989, and Du only re-connected with Zhao privately in 1992 after Deng Xiaoping's southern tour. He later published the book Du Daozheng Diary: What Zhao Ziyang Said in Hong Kong.

In 1991, with the support of Xiao Ke, a liberal general of the Chinese People's Liberation Army, Du founded the Yanhuang Chunqiu journal in Beijing and served as the director of the publisher. But the traditional version of the journal was cracked down by Xi Jinping's administration in 2016, with Du and other editors replaced by pro-Xi personnel.

Daozheng turned 100 on September 22, 2023.

== See also ==
- Boluan Fanzheng
- Reform and opening up
- Prisoner of the State, Zhao Ziyang's memoir, written by Du Daozheng
