= Liang Boqi =

Wife of Zhao Ziyang (1918–2013)

- 梁伯琪
- Born: 1918; Neihuang, Henan, Republic of China
- Died: December 25, 2013 (aged 94–95); Beijing, China
- Resting place: Tianshouyuan Cemetery; Beijing, China
- Spouse: Zhao Ziyang (m. 1944; died 2005)
- Children: 5

Liang Boqi (Chinese: 梁伯琪; pinyin: Liáng Bóqí; 1918 – December 25, 2013) was the wife of Zhao Ziyang, the third premier of the People's Republic of China from 1980 to 1987, vice chairman of the Chinese Communist Party (CCP) from 1981 to 1982, and CCP general secretary from 1987 to 1989.

== Life ==
In 1918, Liang Boqi was born in Nanzhuang, Chengguan Town, Neihuang County. When she was in middle school, she studied in Kaifeng and Wuhan. After the July 7th Incident in 1937, Liang Boqi dropped out of school and returned to her hometown. In April 1938, she participated in the Anti-Japanese Movement led by the CCP. In August of the same year, she joined the CCP. In October, she served as the team leader of the Southern Hebei sub-team of the Chinese National Liberation Vanguard, a youth anti-Japanese organization led by the CCP. She also served as the deputy director of the Propaganda Department of the Women's National Salvation Association of the Hebei-Shandong-Henan Border Region.

In January 1939, Liang Boqi was sent by the CCP organization to Hua County, Henan Province, as the director of the Women's Salvation Congress, becoming the first full-time female cadre in the Hua County Committee of the CCP and the Hua County Anti-Japanese Democratic Government. During this time, Liang Boqi and Zhao Ziyang, who was then the secretary of Hua County Committee of the CCP and working as a superior, had the opportunity to connect and discover their shared experiences of studying in Kaifeng and Wuhan. This brought them closer together.

Shortly thereafter, Liang Boqi was transferred to the Party School of the Northern Bureau of the CCP Central Committee for study. After completing her studies, she remained in the Northern Bureau to work. For the next two years, Liang Boqi and Zhao Ziyang worked in their respective positions and lost contact with each other.

In the autumn of 1943, Liang Boqi was sent by the CCP to return to Hua County to assist Zhao Ziyang in carrying out a pilot project of the democratic and people's livelihood movement; in the winter of 1944, Zhao Ziyang and Liang Boqi got married in Liang'erzhuang village in Hua County.

On December 25, 2013, Liang Boqi died in Beijing Hospital at the age of 95.

In 2019, Liang Boqi's remains were interred alongside the remains of her husband in a cemetery located about 60 kilometers outside Beijing.
