= Yangcheng Evening News =

Simplified Chinese newspaper

Yangcheng Evening Post
- Native name: 羊城晚报
- Type: newspaper
- Owner: Yangcheng Evening News Group
- Founded: October 1, 1957
- Language: Chinese
- Headquarters: Guangzhou, Guangdong
- Website: ep.ycwb.com/epaper/ycwb/

Yangcheng Evening News(simplified Chinese: 羊城晚报; traditional Chinese: 羊城晚報; pinyin: Yángchéng Wǎnbào), also known as Yangcheng Evening Post or Ram City Evening Post, is a Chinese newspaper in the Standard Chinese language, national unified publication number CN44-0006 in Guangzhou, Guangdong, China.

== History ==
The publication of Yangcheng Evening Post was started on October 1, 1957, in Guangzhou, China. The newspaper was forced to stop publication during the Cultural Revolution and resumed publication on February 15, 1980. Started from May 18, 1998, the paper became among several newspapers published by the Yangcheng Evening News Group.
