= Zhao Ziyang =

Chinese politician (1919–2005)

- 赵紫阳
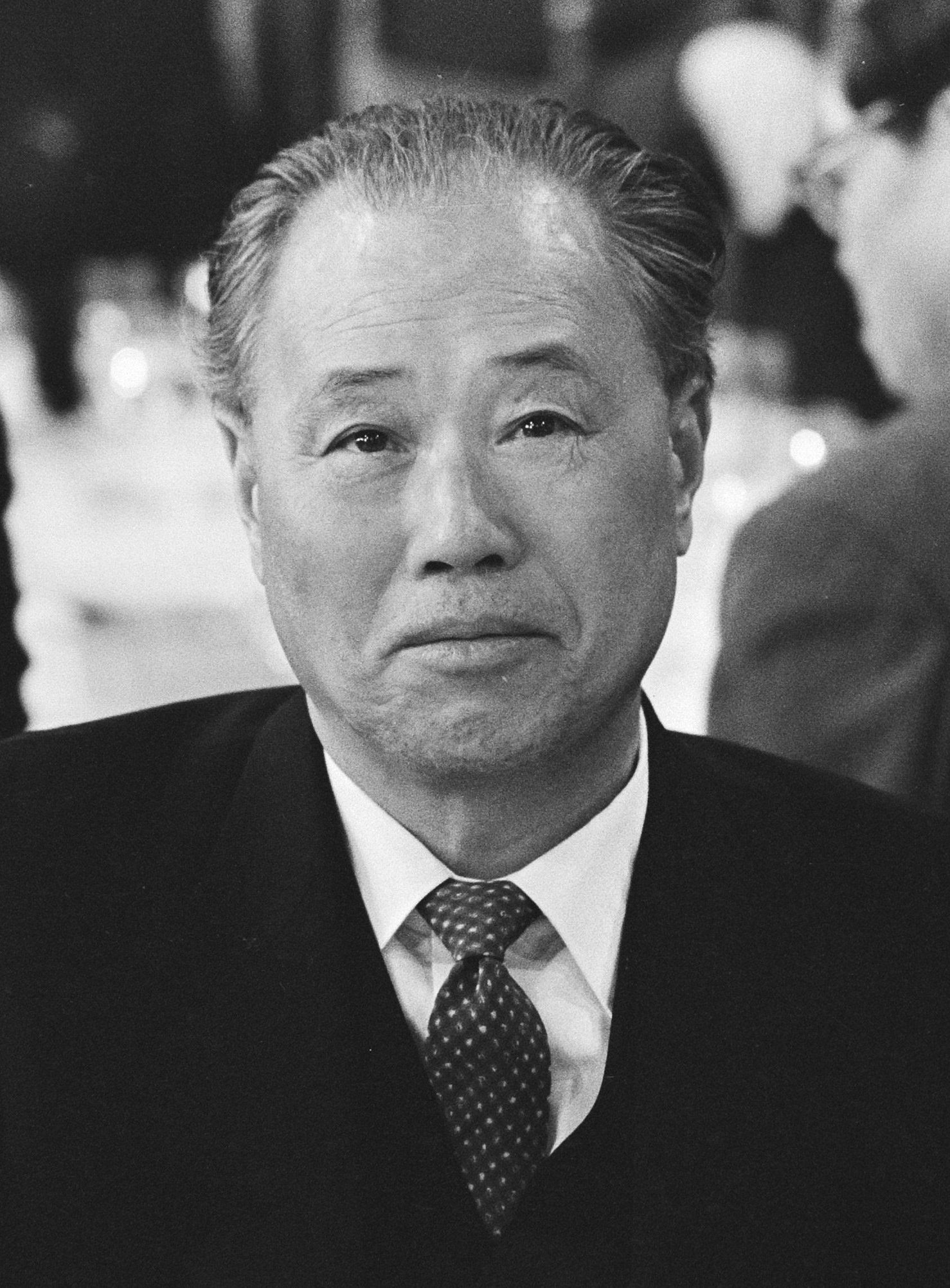
- Zhao at a government dinner hosted by Dutch Prime Minister Ruud Lubbers during his official trip to the Netherlands in 1985

General Secretary of the Chinese Communist Party
- In office 15 January 1987^{[a]} – 24 June 1989
- Preceded by: Hu Yaobang
- Succeeded by: Jiang Zemin

Premier of China
- In office 10 September 1980 – 24 November 1987
- President: Li Xiannian
- Vice Premier: See list: Wan Li; Yao Yilin; Li Peng; Tian Jiyun; Qiao Shi
- Preceded by: Hua Guofeng
- Succeeded by: Li Peng

First Vice Chairman of the Central Military Commission
- In office 1 November 1987 – 23 June 1989 Serving with Yang Shangkun
- Chairman: Deng Xiaoping

Vice Chairman of the Chinese Communist Party
- In office 29 June 1981 – 12 September 1982 Serving with: Ye Jianying; Deng Xiaoping; Li Xiannian; Chen Yun; Hua Guofeng
- Chairman: Hu Yaobang

Vice Chairman of the Chinese People's Political Consultative Conference
- In office 8 March 1978 – 17 June 1983
- Chairman: Deng Xiaoping

Personal details
- Born: Zhao Xiuye; 17 October 1919 Hua County, Henan, Republic of China
- Died: 17 January 2005 (aged 85) Beijing, People's Republic of China
- Resting place: Changping District, Beijing
- Party: Chinese Communist Party (1938–2005)
- Spouse: Liang Boqi (m. 1944)
- Children: 6
- Awards: Gold Mercury International Award (1984)
- Central institution membership: 1987–1989: 13th Central Military Commission; 1980–1989: 11th, 12th, 13th Politburo Standing Committee; 1979–1989: 11th, 12th, 13th Politburo; 1972–1989: 9th, 10th, 11th, 12th, 13th Central Committee; ?–1989: 7th National People's Congress Other offices held; 1987–1989: Vice Chairman, State Central Military Commission; 1987–1989: Vice Chairman, Party Central Military Commission; 1981–1982: Vice Chairman, Central Committee; 1980–1989: Leader, Leading Group for Financial and Economic Affairs; 1975–1980: Governor, Sichuan Province; 1975–1980: Party Committee Secretary, Sichuan Province; 1974–1975: Governor, Guangdong Province; 1974–1975: Party Committee Secretary, Guangdong Province; 1965–1967: Party Committee Secretary, Guangdong Province
- a. Acting: 15 January – 1 November 1987

Zhao Ziyang
- "Zhao Ziyang" in Simplified (top) and Traditional (bottom) Chinese characters
- Simplified Chinese: 赵紫阳
- Traditional Chinese: 趙紫陽
Transcriptions
Standard Mandarin
- Hanyu Pinyin: Zhào Zǐyáng
- Wade–Giles: Chao^{4} Tzu^{3}-yang^{2}
- IPA: [ʈʂâʊ tsɹ̩̀.jǎŋ]
Yue: Cantonese
- Jyutping: Ziu^{6} Zi^{2}-joeng^{4}
- IPA: [tsiw˨ tsi˧˥ jœŋ˩]
Southern Min
- Hokkien POJ: Tiō Chí-iông

Zhao Xiuye
- Simplified Chinese: 赵修业
- Traditional Chinese: 趙修業
Transcriptions
Standard Mandarin
- Hanyu Pinyin: Zhào Xiūyè

Zhao Ziyang (Note: Chinese: 赵紫阳; pronounced [ʈʂâʊ tsɹ̩̀.jǎŋ]) (17 October 1919 – 17 January 2005) was a Chinese politician. He served as the premier of China from 1980 to 1987, as vice chairman of the Chinese Communist Party (CCP) from 1981 to 1982, and as the general secretary of the Chinese Communist Party from 1987 to 1989. He was in charge of the political reforms in China from 1986, but lost power for his support of the 1989 Tiananmen Square protests.

Zhao joined the Chinese Communist Party (CCP) in February 1938. During the Second Sino-Japanese War, he served as the chief officer of CCP Hua County Committee, Director of the Organization Department of the CCP Yubei Prefecture Party Committee, Secretary of the CCP Hebei-Shandong-Henan Border Region Prefecture Party Committee and Political Commissar of the 4th Military Division of the Hebei-Shandong-Henan Military Region. During the Chinese Civil War of 1945–1949, Zhao served as the Deputy Political Commissar of Tongbai Military Region, Secretary of the CCP Nanyang Prefecture Party Committee and Political Commissar of Nanyang Military Division.

After the establishment of the People's Republic of China, Zhao became Deputy Secretary of the South China Branch of the CCP Central Committee. He also served as Secretary of the Secretariat of the Guangdong Provincial Committee of the CCP, Second Secretary and First Secretary of the Guangdong Provincial Committee of the CCP. He was persecuted during the Cultural Revolution and spent time in political exile. After being rehabilitated, Zhao then was appointed Secretary of the CCP Inner Mongolia Autonomous Region Committee, First Secretary of the CCP Guangdong Provincial Committee, First Secretary of the CCP Sichuan Provincial Committee and First Political Commissar of the Chengdu Military Region, Vice Chairman of the National Committee of the Chinese People's Political Consultative Conference.

As a senior government official, Zhao was critical of Maoist policies and instrumental in implementing free-market reforms, first in Sichuan and subsequently nationwide. He emerged on the national scene due to support from Deng Xiaoping after the Cultural Revolution, being appointed as premier in 1980. An advocate of the privatization of state-owned enterprises, the separation of the party and the state, and reform and opening up, he sought measures to streamline China's bureaucracy and fight corruption and issues that challenged the party's legitimacy in the 1980s. Many of these views were shared by the then CCP general secretary Hu Yaobang. After Hu's downfall in 1987, Zhao succeeded him as Party general secretary.

His economic reform policies and sympathies with student demonstrators during the Tiananmen Square protests of 1989 placed him at odds with some members of the party leadership, including Central Advisory Commission Chairman Chen Yun, CPPCC Chairman Li Xiannian, and Premier Li Peng. Zhao also began to lose favor with Deng Xiaoping, who was the Chairman of the Central Military Commission. In the aftermath of the events, Zhao was purged politically and effectively placed under house arrest for the rest of his life. After his house arrest, he became much more radical in his political beliefs, supporting China's full transition to liberal democracy. He died from a stroke in Beijing in January 2005. Because of his political fall from grace, he was not given the funeral rites generally accorded to senior Chinese officials. His secret memoirs were smuggled out and published in English and in Chinese in 2009, but the details of his life remain censored in China.

== Early career ==
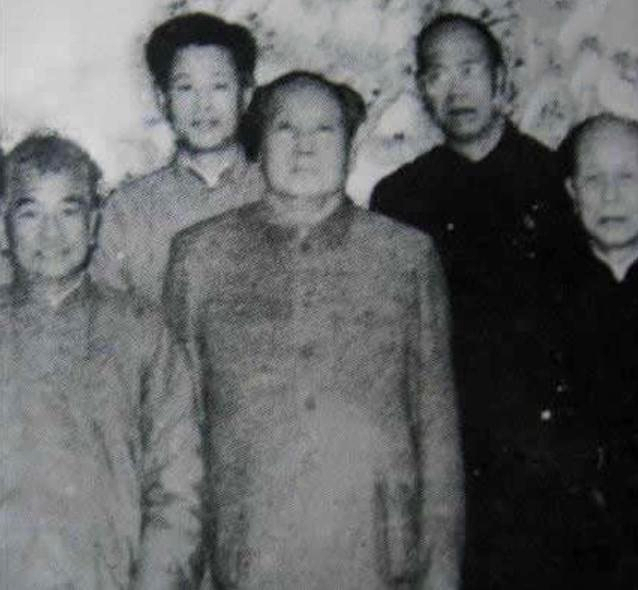
Zhao (top left) pictured with Mao Zedong in Wuhan, January 1966

Zhao was born in 1919 as Zhao Xiuye (Chinese: 趙修業), but changed his given name to "Ziyang" while attending middle school in Wuhan. He was the son of a wealthy landlord in Hua County, Henan, who was later murdered by CCP officials during a land reform movement in the early 1940s. Zhao joined the Communist Youth League in 1932, and became a full member of the Party in 1938.

Unlike many Party members active in the 1930s and 1940s who later became senior Chinese leaders, Zhao joined the Party too late to have participated in the Long March of 1934–1935. He served in the People's Liberation Army, which was integrated into the Republic of China's National Revolutionary Army during the Second Sino-Japanese War, and the subsequent civil war, but his posts were largely administrative. In the late 1930s and early 1940s, Zhao served as the party chief of Hua County. It was there he met his wife, Liang Boqi, who was Zhao's subordinate; the couple married in 1944. Zhao's career was not especially notable before he emerged as a Party leader in Guangdong in the early 1950s.

Zhao rose to prominence in Guangdong from 1951, initially following a ruthless ultra-leftist, Tao Zhu, who was notable for his heavy-handed efforts to force local peasants into living and working in "People's Communes". When Mao Zedong's Great Leap Forward (1958–1961) created an artificial famine, Mao publicly blamed the nation's food shortages on the greed of rich peasants, who were supposedly hiding China's huge surplus production from the government. Zhao subsequently led a local campaign aimed at torturing peasants into revealing their food supplies, which did not exist. On the other hand, Zhao worked with regional party officials to put in place arrangements that allowed peasants to profit from the sale of their crops. These projects were masked by ambiguous names such as "a control system for field management" to hide them from Mao, who would have forbidden the projects. According to Zhao, areas where these plans were implemented had a much lower death toll from famine. Jasper Becker, however, wrote that Zhao's torture campaign during the Great Leap meant he was partially responsible for the millions of people who died from starvation and malnutrition in Guangdong between 1958 and 1961.

Zhao's experiences during the Great Leap Forward led him to support moderate political and economic policies. In the early 1960s, Zhao obtained permission from the Communist Party's Central Committee to increase foreign trade in Guangdong, which helped Guangdong to recover from the Great Leap Forward. He supported policies of Deng Xiaoping and President Liu Shaoqi. He led efforts to re-introduce limited amounts of private agriculture and commerce, and dismantled the People's Communes. Zhao's methods of returning private plots to farmers and assigning production contracts to individual households were replicated in other parts of China, helping the country's agricultural sector recover. After achieving senior positions in Guangdong, Zhao directed a harsh purge of cadres accused of corruption or having ties to the Kuomintang.

In 1965, Zhao became the Party secretary of Guangdong province. He was 46 at the time that he first became Party secretary, a notably young age to hold such a prestigious position. Because of his moderate political orientation, Zhao was attacked by Red Guards during the Cultural Revolution (1966–1976).

He was dismissed from all official positions in 1967, after which he was paraded through Guangzhou in a dunce cap and publicly denounced as "a stinking remnant of the landlord class".

== Return to government ==
Zhao spent four years as a fitter in Hunan, at the Xianzhong Mechanics Factory. Zhao Wujun, the youngest of his five sons, worked with him (Zhao also had a younger daughter). While in political exile, Zhao's family lived in a small apartment near his factory, with a small suitcase in the living room that served as a dinner table.

Zhao's rehabilitation began in 1971, when he and his family were woken in the middle of the night by someone banging on the door. Without much explanation, the Party chief of the factory that Zhao was working at informed Zhao that he was to go at once to Changsha, the provincial capital. The factory's only means of transport was a three-wheeled motorcycle, which was ready to take him. Zhao was driven to Changsha's airport, where a plane had been prepared to fly him to Beijing. Still unaware of what was happening, Zhao boarded the plane. He was checked into the comfortable Beijing Hotel, but was unable to sleep: he later claimed that, after years of living in poverty, the mattress was too soft. In the morning, Zhao was taken to a meeting with Premier Zhou Enlai at the Great Hall of the People. Soon after they met, Zhao began a speech that he had prepared over the previous night: "I have been rethinking the Cultural Revolution during these years as a labourer..." Zhou cut him off, saying "You've been called to Beijing because the Central Committee has decided to name you as a deputy Party chief of Inner Mongolia."

After being recalled from political exile, Zhao attempted to portray himself as a Maoist, and publicly renounced any interest in encouraging private enterprise or material incentive. Zhao's late conversion to Maoism did not last long, and he later became a "principal architect" of the sweeping, pro-market changes that followed the death of Mao. Despite his important role in guiding the economy of China over the course of his career, Zhao had no formal training in economics.

Throughout 1972, Zhou Enlai directed Zhao's political rehabilitation. He was appointed to the Central Committee, and in Inner Mongolia became the Revolutionary Committee Secretary and vice-chairman in March 1972. Zhao was elevated to the 10th Central Committee in August 1973, and returned to Guangdong as 1st CCP Secretary and Revolutionary Committee Chair in April 1974. He became Political Commissar of the Chengdu Military Region in December 1975.

=== Economic reforms in Sichuan ===
Zhao was appointed Party Secretary of Sichuan in 1975, effectively the province's highest-ranking official. Earlier in the Cultural Revolution, Sichuan had been notable for the violent battles that rival organizations of local Red Guards had fought against each other. At the time, Sichuan was China's most populous province, but had been economically devastated by the Great Leap Forward and the Cultural Revolution, whose collective policies had collapsed the province's agricultural production to levels not seen since the 1930s, despite a great increase in the province's population. The economic situation was so dire that citizens in Sichuan were reportedly selling their daughters for food.

During his tenure in Sichuan, Zhao introduced a series of successful market-oriented reforms, which distributed farmland to families for private use, and allowed peasants to freely sell their crops on the marketplace. His policies also permitted greater autonomy and productivity incentives for factory managers. The reforms led to an increase in industrial production by 81% and agricultural output by 25% within three years. Zhao's reforms made him popular in Sichuan, where the local people coined the saying: "要吃粮, 找紫阳"; "yào chī liǎng, zhǎo Zǐyáng". (This saying is a homophonic pun on Zhao's name, loosely translated as: "if you want to eat, look for Ziyang.")

== Reformist leader ==
After ousting Hua Guofeng as China's "paramount leader" in 1978, Deng Xiaoping recognized the "Sichuan Experience" as a model for the reform and opening up. Deng promoted Zhao to a position as an alternate member of the CCP Politburo in 1977, and as a full member in 1979. He joined the CCP Politburo Standing Committee, China's highest ruling organ, in 1980. Zhao became the Leader of the Leading Group for Financial and Economic Affairs and Vice Chairman of the CCP in 1980 and 1981 separately.

After 1978 Zhao's policies were replicated in Anhui, with similar success. After serving under Hua Guofeng as vice premier for six months, Zhao was promoted by Deng Xiaoping to replace Hua as the Premier of the State Council in September 1980, with a mandate to introduce his rural reforms across China. Between 1980 and 1984, China's agricultural production rose by 50%.

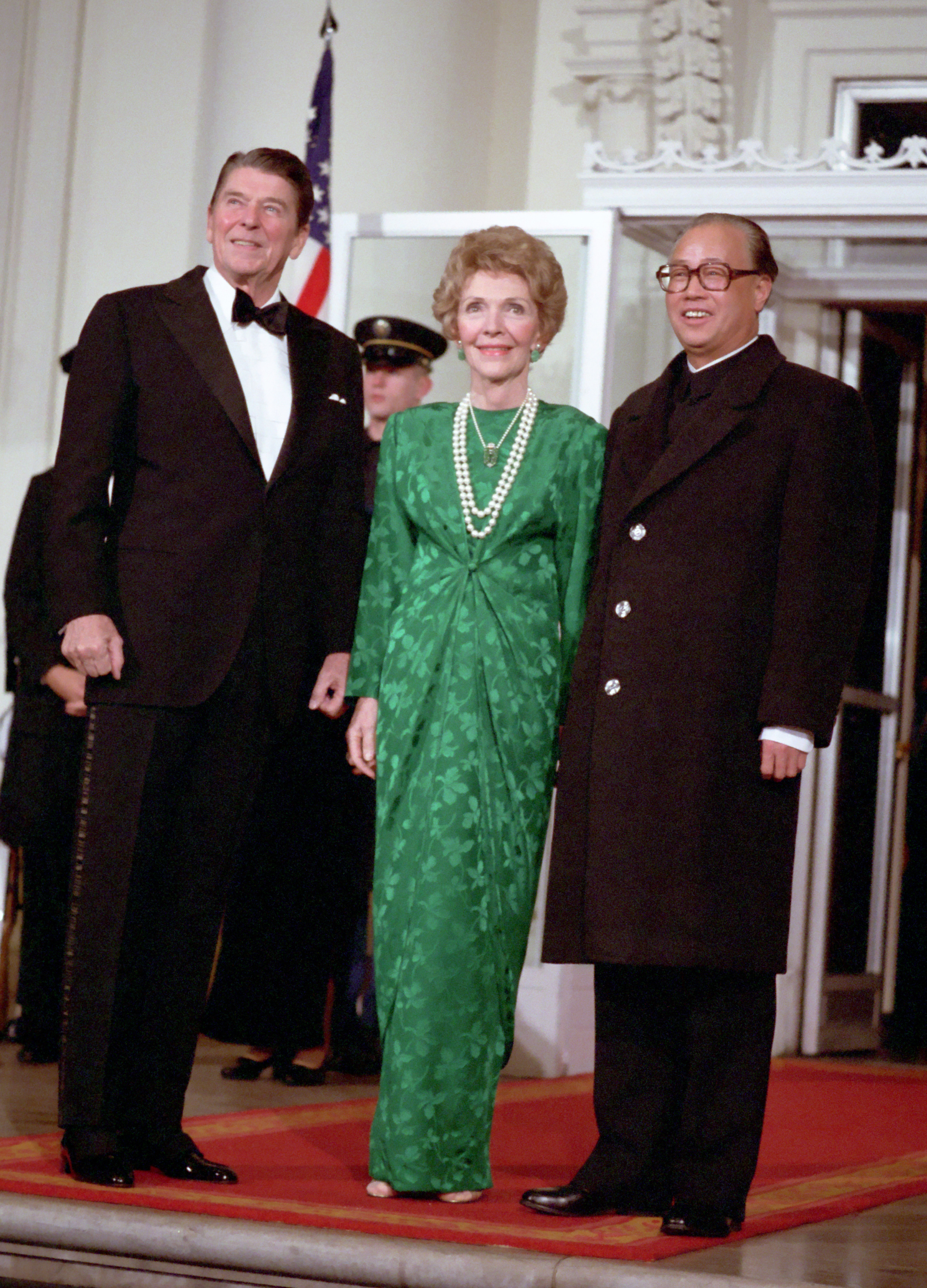
Zhao was hosted by US president Ronald Reagan at the White House on 10 January 1984 as part of a broader effort to improve China's relations with the West.

Zhao developed "preliminary stage theory", a model for transforming the socialist system via gradual economic reform. As premier, Zhao implemented many of the policies that were successful in Sichuan at a national scale, increasingly de-centralizing industrial and agricultural production. Zhao successfully sought to establish a series of special economic zones in coastal provinces in order to attract foreign investment and create export hubs. Inspired by futurists, especially Alvin Toffler, he led the 863 Program to respond to rapid global technological change. Zhao's reforms led to a rapid increases in both agricultural and light-industrial production throughout the 1980s, but his economic reforms were criticized for causing inflation. Zhao promoted an open foreign policy, improving China's relations with Western nations in order to support China's economic development.

As Premier, Zhao had a substantial role in developing China's science and technology policies in the 1980s. His first major address as highlighted policy and science as the major drivers of China's development. In 1982, Zhao was named the head of the newly-established Science and Technology Leading Small Group.

One of Zhao's major cultural reforms included allowing the band Wham! to make a 10-day visit to China, the first by a Western pop group. Wham!'s 1985 visit, engineered by the band's manager Simon Napier-Bell, was a highly publicized cultural exchange and seen as a major step in increasing friendly bilateral relations between China and the West. Zhao was a fan of golf, and is credited with popularizing the game's reintroduction to the mainland in the 1980s.

In the 1980s, Zhao was branded by conservatives as a revisionist of Marxism, but his advocacy of government transparency and a national dialogue that included ordinary citizens in the policymaking process made him popular with many. Zhao was a solid believer in the Party, but he defined socialism very differently from Party conservatives. Zhao called political reform "the biggest test facing socialism." He believed economic progress was inextricably linked to democratization.

While Zhao focused on economic reforms during the early 1980s, his superior, Hu Yaobang, promoted a number of political reforms. In the late 1980s Hu and Zhao collaborated to promote a series of large-scale political reforms with vaguely defined goals. The political reforms of Hu and Zhao included proposals to have candidates directly elected to the Politburo, more elections with more than one candidate, more government transparency, more consultation with the public on policy, and increased personal responsibility directed to officials for their mistakes.

Zhao and Hu also began a large-scale anti-corruption programme, and permitted the investigations of the children of high-ranking Party elders, who had grown up protected by their parents' influence. Hu's investigation of Party officials belonging to this "Crown Prince Party" made Hu unpopular with many powerful Party officials. In January 1987 a clique of Party elders forced Hu to resign, on the grounds that he had been too lenient in his response to the student protests that had taken place over the last year. After Hu's dismissal, Deng promoted Zhao to replace Hu as CCP general secretary, putting Zhao in the position to succeed Deng as "paramount leader". One month before Zhao was appointed to the position of general secretary, Zhao stated to an American reporter that "I am not fit to be the general secretary... I am more fit to look after economic affairs." Zhao's vacated premiership was in turn filled by Li Peng, a conservative who opposed many of Zhao's economic and political reforms.

At the 13th National Party Congress in 1987, Zhao declared that China was in "a primary stage of socialism" that could last 100 years. Under this premise, Zhao believed that China needed to experiment with a variety of economic reforms in order to stimulate production. Zhao also proposed to separate the roles of the Party and state, a proposal that has since become taboo. In Zhao's view, developing a state civil service separate from the Party would enhance bureaucratic efficiency, professionalism, and correct what he deemed as Party "overinterference" in state administration.

The 13th Congress was also notable because no women were elected to the Politburo and Central Committee secretariat; according to Zhao, the results "[did not] mean [the party leadership had] adjusted [their] policies on women." According to Ellen Judd, members of women's organizations, including the All-China Women's Federation, attributed the reduced number of women in lower party positions to "open comments" by Zhao against female political participation. The number of women occupying leadership positions at various party levels had been declining since the latter half the 1970s.

Western observers generally view the year that Zhao served as general secretary as the most open in the history of the People's Republic of China. Many limitations on freedom of speech and freedom of press were relaxed, allowing intellectuals to freely express themselves, and to propose "improvements" for the country.

=== Introduction of the stock market and financial reforms ===
Zhao introduced the stock market in China and promoted futures trading there. In 1984, with his support, Beijing, Shanghai and Guangzhou became experimental cities of a joint-stock system; however, some companies only issued stock to their workers. In November 1985, the first share-issuing enterprise was established in Shanghai and publicly issued 10,000 shares of 50 RMB par value stock, which attracted investors. Zhao hosted a financial meeting on 2 August 1986, calling for the joint stock system to be implemented nationwide in the following year.

Zhao played a major role in the approach to price liberalization and the question of whether China should adopt a sudden price liberalization approach akin to shock therapy or a more gradual model. "Confronted with the diverse, authoritative warnings about the unforeseeable risks of imposing the shock of price reform and the uncertainty about its benefits" he ultimately rejected shock price reform. Zhao had accepted the argument that the basic concern in economic reform was energizing enterprises. By late summer of 1986, what started under the rubric of "coordinated comprehensive package reform" had been diluted to an adjustment in the price of steel (although its price was both important and carried symbolic weight) as well as partial tax and financial reform. Zhao's reform program in 1987 and early 1988 focused on combining enterprise contracting and a coastal development strategy.

Zhao's proposed in May 1988 to accelerate price reform, which was formalized in August. News of the reform led to widespread complaints about rampant inflation and panic buying, giving opponents of rapid reform the opportunity to call for greater centralization of economic controls and stricter prohibitions against Western influence. This precipitated a political debate, which grew more heated through the winter of 1988 to 1989. The price reform was shelved, and its failure greatly weakened the authority of Zhao.

=== Relationship with party elders ===
Because Zhao had risen to power through his work in the provinces, he never enjoyed strong connections among the Party leadership in Beijing. Because he had led the Communist Youth League in the 1950s, Zhao often relied on its former members for support, and Zhao's enemies accused him of promoting a "Communist Youth League faction" within the CCP. Among Beijing's Party elders, Chen Yun and Li Xiannian were notably critical of Zhao and his policies.

Despite his criticism of Zhao, Chen Yun was the Party elder most respected by Zhao, and Zhao would frequently attempt to consult with Chen before implementing new policies. Li Xiannian resented Zhao personally for Zhao's interest in foreign culture, and his willingness to learn from economic models that had been successful outside of China. According to Zhao, Li Xiannian "hated me because I was implementing Deng Xiaoping's reforms, but since it was difficult for him to openly oppose Deng, he made me the target of the opposition."

Zhao wrote warmly of Hu Yaobang in his memoirs, and generally agreed with Hu on the direction of China's economic reforms. Although Deng Xiaoping was Zhao's only firm supporter among the Party elders, Deng's support was sufficient to protect Zhao throughout Zhao's career. As late as April 1989, one month before the dramatic end to Zhao's career, Deng assured Zhao that he had secured the support of Chen Yun and Li Xiannian for Zhao to serve two more full terms as Party general secretary.

The second half of 1988 saw the increasing deterioration of Zhao's political support. Zhao found himself in multi-front turf battles with the Party elders, who grew increasingly dissatisfied with Zhao's hands-off approach to ideological matters. The conservative faction in the politburo, led by Premier Li Peng and Vice-premier Yao Yilin, were constantly at odds with Zhao in economic and fiscal policy making. Zhao was under growing pressure to combat runaway corruption by rank-and-file officials and their family members. In the beginning of 1989, it was evident that Zhao was faced with an increasingly difficult uphill battle, and he may have seen that he was fighting for his own political survival. If Zhao was unable to turn things around rapidly, a showdown with the Party conservatives would be all but inevitable. The student protests triggered by the sudden death of former CCP general secretary Hu Yaobang, widely admired as a reform-minded leader, created a crisis in which Zhao was forced into a confrontation with his political enemies.

== Tiananmen Square protests ==
Zhao was general secretary for little more than a year before the death of Hu Yaobang on 15 April 1989, which, coupled with a growing sense of public outrage caused by high inflation and economic uncertainty, provided the backdrop for the large-scale protest of 1989 by students, intellectuals, and other parts of a disaffected urban population. The Tiananmen protests initially began as a spontaneous public mourning for Hu, but evolved into nationwide protests supporting political reform and demanding an end to Party corruption.

Student demonstrators, taking advantage of the loosening political atmosphere, reacted to a variety of causes of discontent. The diverse demands of protesters included greater economic liberalization, political democracy, media freedom, freedom of speech and association, rule of law, and to have the legitimacy of the movement recognized. Some protest leaders spoke against official corruption and speculation, price stability, social security, and the democratic means to supervise the reform process. Ironically, some of the original invective was also directed against Zhao. Party hard-liners increasingly came to the conclusion that the demonstrations were due to Zhao's rapid pace of reform, which they believed caused a sense of confusion and frustration among college students. The protesters may have also been encouraged by the imminent collapse of other Communist governments in Eastern Europe.

Zhao treated the protesters sympathetically. While the protests were dying down on 26 April, Zhao was obliged (as the Party General Secretary) to leave for North Korea on a state visit. While he was away, Premier Li Peng organized a meeting between Deng Xiaoping and the Politburo Standing Committee, in which Li and his allies convinced Deng that the protests were threatening to the Party. Following the meeting, Li had the People's Daily publish an article (which he attributed to Deng), which criticized the protests as "premeditated and organized turmoil with anti-Party and anti-socialist motives." Following the publication of Li's article, the protests grew to over 10,000 and spread to cities across China, notably including Shanghai and Guangzhou.

Zhao attempted to mollify the protesters by engaging in dialogue with student groups. He attempted to institute numerous government reforms, including the creation of a special commission to investigate government corruption; but, according to Zhao, the commission was ineffective because "Li Peng and others in his group actively attempted to block, delay and even sabotage the process." Zhao attempted to arrange a meeting with Deng in order to convince him to retract Li's "April 26 article". He was granted a meeting with Deng on 17 May; but, instead of the private meeting he expected, he found that the entire Standing Committee was present. When Zhao advocated modifying the editorial, President Yang Shangkun proposed declaring martial law according to the decision of National People's Congress, which Zhao refused. The next day, Zhao wrote a letter to Deng, suggesting he retract the 26 April editorial to reduce tensions between protesters and the government. In the letter, Zhao also warned that "imposing harsh measures while a majority of people are adamantly opposed may result in serious repercussions that threaten the fate of the Party and the state." He did not receive a reply.

Deng eventually decided on declaring martial law. According to the Tiananmen Papers, the standing committee vote was split 2–2 with one abstention, and retired CCP veterans were called in to determine the vote. According to Zhao however, there was no vote, and the decision to declare martial law was illegal according to the Party's rules.

=== Speech to students ===
Shortly before 5 am on 19 May, Zhao appeared in Tiananmen Square and wandered among the crowd of protesters. Using a megaphone, he delivered a now-famous speech to the students gathered at the square. It was first broadcast through China Central Television nationwide, and reported on by the Xinhua News Agency. Below is a translated version:

Students, we came too late. We are sorry. You talk about us, criticize us, it is all necessary. The reason that I came here is not to ask for your forgiveness. What I want to say is that you are all getting weak, it has been seven days since you went on a hunger strike, you can't continue like this. As time goes on, your body will be damaged beyond repair, it could be very life-threatening. Now the most important thing is to end this strike. I know, your hunger strike is to hope that the Party and the government will give you a satisfying answer. I feel that our communication is open. Some of these problems can only be solved through certain procedures. For example, you have mentioned the nature of the incident, the question of responsibility; I feel that those problems can be resolved eventually, we can reach a mutual agreement in the end. However, you should also know that the situation is very complicated, it is going to be a long process. You can't continue the hunger strike longer than seven days, and still insist on receiving a satisfying answer before ending the hunger strike.

You are still young, we are old, you must live healthy, and see the day when China accomplishes the Four Modernizations. Unlike you, we are already old, and do not matter. It is not easy for this nation and your parents to support your college studies. Now you are all about 20, and about to sacrifice your lives so easily. Students, can't you think rationally? Now the situation is very serious, you all know, the Party and the nation is very anxious, and our society is very worried. Besides, Beijing is the capital, the situation is getting worse and worse everywhere, this cannot continue. Students, you all have good will, and are for the good of our nation, but if this situation continues, loses control, it will have serious consequences elsewhere.

In conclusion, I have only one wish. If you stop this hunger strike, the government won't close the door for dialogue, never! The questions that you have raised, we can continue to discuss. Although it is a little slow, we are reaching some agreement on some problems. Today I just want to see the students, and express our feelings. I hope students could think about these issues calmly. This situation cannot be sorted out clearly under illogical circumstances. You all have that strength, you are young, after all. We were also young once, we protested, laid our bodies on the rail tracks; we never thought about what will happen in the future back then. Finally, I beg the students, once again, to think about the future calmly. There are many things that can be solved. I hope that you will all end the hunger strike soon, thank you.

— Zhao Ziyang

After a bow, people began to applaud and some students burst into tears. That was Zhao's last public appearance, for Zhao had been ousted by party elders just before coming to the square. The phrase "We are already old, and do not matter" (我们已经老了, 无所谓) and Zhao's speech, have since become a well known part of the protests. What motivated Zhao's visit remains, even today, a topic of debate. According to Wu Guoguang, Zhao's former speechwriter, some say he went into the square hoping a conciliatory gesture would gain him leverage against hard-liners like Premier Li Peng. Others believe he supported the protesters and misjudged the risk of breaking with the leadership.

=== Aftermath ===
The protesters did not disperse. A day after Zhao's 19 May visit to Tiananmen Square, Premier Li Peng publicly declared martial law, leading to the deaths of hundreds of protesters on the 4th of June. On the same day, Deng held another meeting with senior leaders, where he decided to remove Zhao as General Secretary, replacing him with Jiang Zemin.

Around two weeks later, from 19 to 21 June, an enlarged meeting of the Politburo was held to make decisions on the upcoming Fourth Plenum of the 13th Central Committee. The meeting included the Party's most influential elders, and aimed to shape the government's response to the events of 4 June, by consolidating support for the armed crackdown and removing Zhao from office. Participants were invited to display their loyalty to Deng by endorsing two documents: Deng's 9 June speech which justified the use of military force, and a report issued by Li Peng criticizing Zhao's handling of the crisis. Zhao was also allowed to leave his home on 20 June to speak in his own defense. Zhao acknowledged "shortcomings, errors, and mistakes" in his work, but defended his economic work, and refused to accept that he "supported the unrest" and "split the party". He also called for political reforms to remain a priority. Beijing Mayor Chen Xitong attacked Zhao by saying "I feel that Comrade Ziyang is making excuses".

Party hardliners that had opposed Zhao's reforms took the opportunity to criticize him, with elder Wang Zhen stating that Zhao lacked ideological toughness and was bringing China closer to the West. Zhao likewise received no support from his political allies, who wanted forgiveness from the leadership. Hu Qili, who was then a member of the Politburo Standing Committee, acknowledged he had sided with Zhao in opposing martial law, but said that Deng's 9 June speech made him realize his "thinking was not clear in the face of great issues of right and wrong affecting the Party's and the state's future and fate". Hu was subsequently purged from his position, but held several ministerial and ceremonial positions in the 1990s, along with the benefits granted to retired leaders. Zhao himself later described some of the speeches at the meeting as "entirely in the style of the Cultural Revolution", saying his opponents engaged in "reversing black and white, exaggerating personal offenses, taking quotes out of context, [and] issuing slanders and lies". The full details of this meeting were not made public until 2019, when transcripts from the meeting were published by New Century Press in Hong Kong, who had obtained copies from a party official.

After the fourth plenum of the 13th Central Committee on 23–24 June, Zhao was dismissed from all his positions. The plenum praised Zhao for his economic reforms, but accused him of "[making] the mistake of supporting the turmoil and splitting the party", and that he had "unshirkable responsibilities for the development of the turmoil". Zhao was subsequently placed under house arrest, but was allowed to maintain his party membership. Following Zhao's dismissal, Jiang Zemin replaced Zhao as General Secretary of the CCP and successor of Deng Xiaoping. Over thirty ministers were dismissed as Zhao loyalists, and Zhao was widely criticized in the Chinese media. In the end, mentioning his name in the media was severely restricted, and he was edited out of photographs and deleted from textbooks.

Zhao's rival, Li Peng, later accused Zhao of fomenting the Tiananmen Protests exclusively for political gain. According to Li, "Zhao liaised with Bao Tong immediately after his arrival in Beijing (from Pyongyang). Bao gathered some other of Zhao's supporters to hash out the situation. They feared that Zhao's political future was at stake: Zhao did not succeed in [managing] the economy, was not stellar politically, does not have a power base of his own, and his son was suspected of illegal business dealings. As such, it was likely that Zhao would become the 'scapegoat' of the student movement. These advisors suggested to Zhao that he maintain distance with Deng Xiaoping [and] attempt to win the people's hearts in order to save himself; there were no other options." Because Zhao was never formally charged with any wrongdoing, it cannot be known what evidence Li had to support his claims.

== House arrest ==
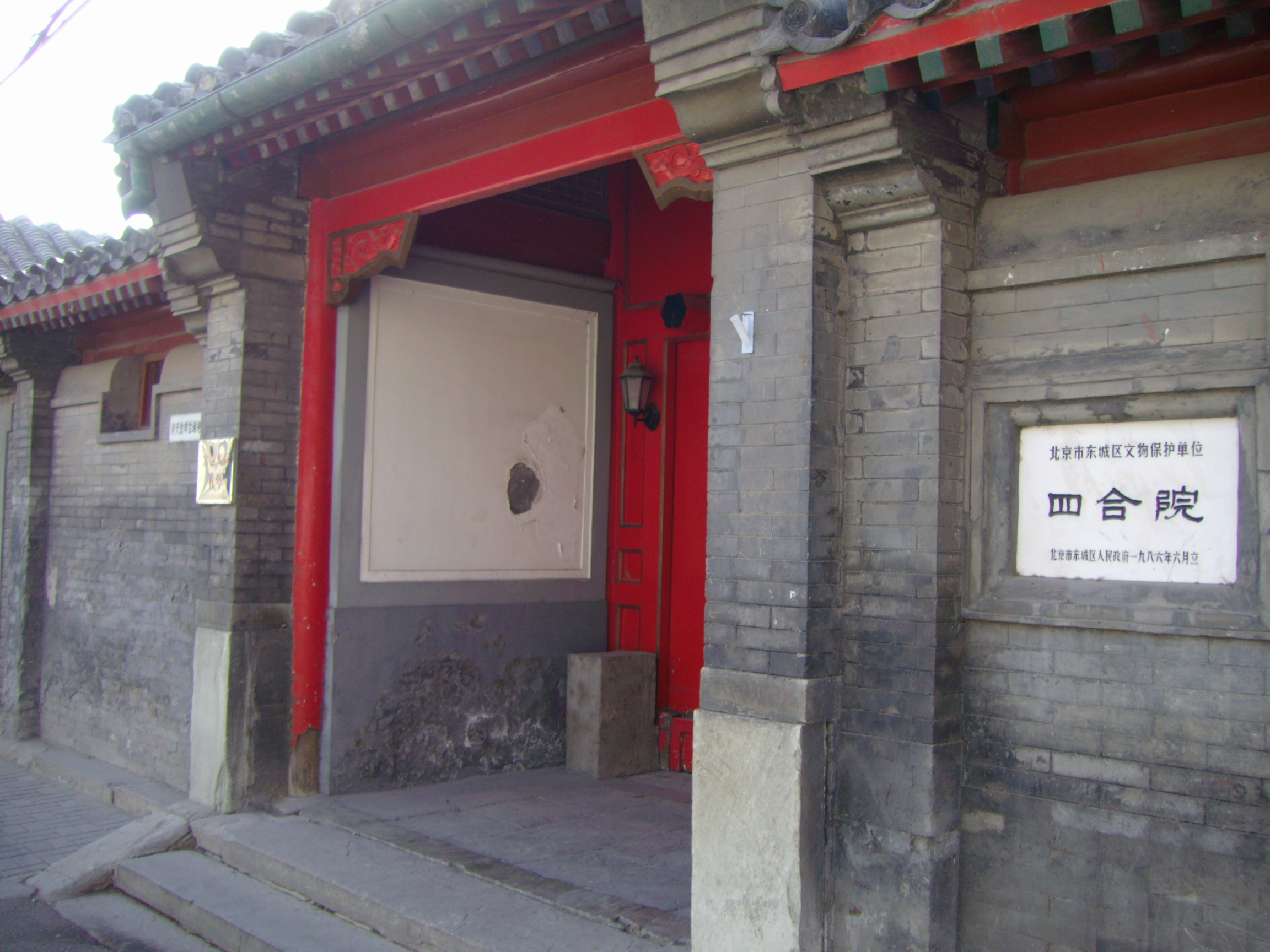
No. 6 Fuqiang Hutong, where Zhao lived

Zhao lived for the next fifteen years under house arrest, accompanied by his wife, at the No. 6 Fuqiang Hutong, in the Dongcheng District of central Beijing, near Zhongnanhai. Supplied by the Beijing government, the Hutong residence had once belonged to a hairdresser of the Qing Dynasty Empress Dowager Cixi, and Hu Yaobang before his death in 1989. The home was a traditional siheyuan, with three courtyards. The front courtyard consisted of an office and sleeping room, and was occupied with guards. Zhao's study was in the second courtyard, while the innermost courtyard housed the living quarters, where Zhao lived with his wife and his daughter's family.

Zhao remained under tight supervision, and was reportedly locked in his home with a bicycle lock. He was only allowed to leave his courtyard compound or receive visitors with permission from the highest echelons of the Party. Beginning in the 1990s, Zhao was allowed to vacation within China under watch, which included travelling to southern China to play golf, with permission from high-ranking party officials. Over that period, only a few snapshots of a gray-haired Zhao leaked out to the media.

Despite Zhao's house arrest, no formal charges were ever laid against him, and he was not expelled from the CCP. He also retained permission to read classified documents. According to Hong Kong-based Open Magazine, Deng considered Zhao neither a "party splittist" nor a "supporter of the upheaval", telling Zhao that his record was 70% good and 30% bad, similar to Deng's own situation under Mao in 1976. Becker, however, contended in Zhao's obituary that Deng and his subordinates "certainly believed Zhao was behind the protests".

After 1989, Zhao remained ideologically estranged from the Chinese government. He remained popular among those who believed that the government was wrong in ordering the Tiananmen Massacre, and that the Party should reassess its position on the student protests. He continued to hold China's top leadership responsible for the assault, and refused to accept the official Party line that the demonstrations had been a part of a "counter-revolutionary rebellion". On at least two occasions Zhao wrote letters, addressed to the Chinese government, in which he put forward the case for a reassessment of the Tiananmen Massacre. One of those letters appeared on the eve of the 15th National Congress of the Chinese Communist Party. The other came during a 1998 visit to China by U.S. President Bill Clinton. Neither was ever published in mainland China. Zhao eventually came to hold a number of beliefs that were much more radical than any positions he had ever expressed while in power. Zhao came to believe that China should adopt a free press, freedom of assembly, an independent judiciary, and a multiparty parliamentary democracy.

== Death ==
In February 2004, Zhao had a pneumonia attack that led to a pulmonary failure, hospitalizing him for three weeks. Zhao was hospitalized again with pneumonia on 5 December 2004. Reports of his death were officially denied in early January 2005. Later, on 15 January, he was reported to be in a coma after multiple strokes. According to Xinhua, Vice President Zeng Qinghong, representing the party's central leadership, visited Zhao in hospital. Zhao died on 17 January in a Beijing hospital at 07:01, at the age of 85. He was survived by his second wife, Liang Boqi, and five children (a daughter and four sons).

=== Government and domestic response ===
After Zhao's death, China's leaders feared an episode of civil disturbance similar to the events that followed the death of Hu Yaobang. In order to manage the news of Zhao's death, the Chinese government created an "Emergency Response Leadership Small Group", which declared "a period of extreme sensitivity", and placed the People's Armed Police on special alert. In order to prevent any mass demonstrations in the capital, the Emergency Group directed the Ministry of Railways to screen travellers headed to Beijing. In order to prevent any public commemoration of Zhao, Chinese authorities increased security in Tiananmen Square and at Zhao's house. Security was also increased at universities in Beijing, with faculty members being told to monitor their students to prevent demonstrations. At the time, most university students that were interviewed by The New York Times knew very little about Zhao, which was linked to government censorship and restrictions on political speech.

The Chinese government also successfully directed China's domestic TV and radio stations not to broadcast the news. The very few that were granted permission to report the story were told to refer to him only as "comrade" without mentioning his past leadership posts.

Under the headline "Comrade Zhao Ziyang has Passed Away", Zhao's official obituary stated, "Comrade Zhao had long suffered from multiple diseases affecting his respiratory and cardiovascular systems, and had been hospitalized for medical treatment several times. His conditions worsened recently, and he passed away Monday after failing to respond to all emergency treatment." All Chinese newspapers carried exactly the same 59-word obituary on the day following his death, leaving the main means of mass dissemination through the Internet. Chinese Internet forums, including the Strong Nation Forum and forums hosted by SINA.com, Xinhua, and the People's Daily, were flooded with messages expressing condolences for Zhao: "Time will vindicate him", wrote one commenter; "We will miss you forever" wrote another. These messages were promptly deleted by moderators, leading to more postings attacking the moderators for their actions. The Chinese government was successful in keeping Zhao's death fairly muted within mainland China. Open, public response was absent, though some online commenters stated that they planned to buy wreaths to mourn his death, or had stood in three minutes of silence to honour Zhao's memory.

In Hong Kong, 10,000–15,000 people attended a candlelight vigil in remembrance of Zhao, organized by the Hong Kong Alliance in Support of Patriotic Democratic Movements of China.

=== International response ===
Similar memorials were held around the world, notably in New York City and Washington, DC where American government officials and exiled political dissidents attended.

In New York City, a public memorial for Zhao was organized by Human Rights in China, a New York-based non-governmental organization. The event was held on 20 January 2005, in the basement of the Sheraton Hotel in Flushing, Queens. It was announced through the local Chinese-language press and over the Internet, which, according to the New York Times, attracted a "standing-room-only crowd". Most of the speakers at the memorial were exiled Chinese dissidents and intellectuals, including Yan Jiaqi, who was Zhao's former advisor. John Liu, then a New York City Councillor from Queens, also attended, making a speech in English.

=== Funeral and burial ===
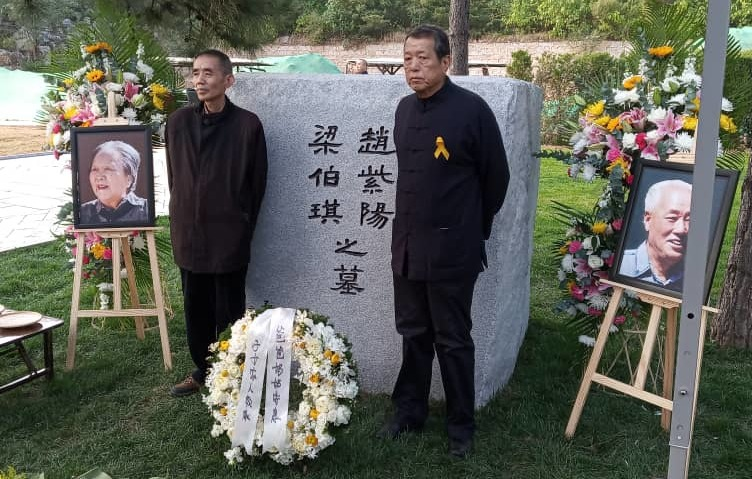
Zhao Ziyang's final burial site in 2019, with his son Zhao Erjun on the right.

On 29 January 2005, the government held a funeral ceremony for him at the Babaoshan Revolutionary Cemetery, a place reserved for revolutionary heroes and high government officials, that was attended by some 2,000 mourners, who were pre-approved to attend. Several dissidents, including Zhao's secretary Bao Tong and Tiananmen Mothers leader Ding Zilin, were kept under house arrest and therefore could not attend. Xinhua reported that the most senior official to attend the funeral was Jia Qinglin, fourth in the party hierarchy, and other officials who attended included He Guoqiang, Wang Gang and Hua Jianmin. Mourners were forbidden to bring flowers or to inscribe their own messages on the government-issued flowers. There was no eulogy at the ceremony because the government and Zhao's family could not agree on its content: while the government wanted to say he made mistakes, his family refused to accept he did anything wrong. On the day of his funeral, state television mentioned Zhao's death for the first time. Xinhua issued a short article on the funerary arrangements, acknowledging Zhao's "contributions to the party and to the people", but said he made "serious mistakes" during the 1989 "political disturbance".

According to Du Daozheng, who wrote the foreword to the Chinese edition of Zhao's memoirs, the use of the term "serious mistakes" instead of the former verdict of supporting a "counter-revolutionary riot" represented a backing down by the Party. After the ceremony, Zhao was cremated. His ashes were taken by his family to his Beijing home, since the government had denied him a place at Babaoshan. In October 2019, Zhao was finally laid to rest at the Tianshouyuan cemetery north of Beijing. Three months later, on the 15th anniversary of Zhao's death, his son Zhao Erjun reported tightened security at the cemetery, with the addition of facial recognition surveillance cameras, ID checks and security guards patrolling Zhao's grave. A tree was also planted in front of the grave, obstructing access to it.

== Legacy ==
=== Push for rehabilitation ===
After Zhao's death, there were a number of calls in the PRC and abroad urging the PRC to reconsider Zhao's role in history. Within mainland China, these calls were largely led by Zhao's former secretary, Bao Tong. Outside of mainland China, Zhao's death produced calls from the governments of Taiwan and Japan urging the PRC to move toward granting the greater political freedoms that Zhao promoted. The Japanese prime minister, Junichiro Koizumi, said as part of a statement on Zhao's death: "I want them to make efforts for democratization". A representative of the ROC cabinet, Chen Chi-mai, stated that Beijing should "face the truth about Tiananmen Square" and "push for democratic reforms". The White House praised Zhao, saying that Zhao "was a man of moral courage who suffered great personal sacrifices for standing by his convictions during difficult times."

Although some of his followers have occasionally attempted to push for Zhao's formal rehabilitation since Zhao's arrest, the Party has been largely successful in removing his name from most public records available in China. Government efforts to delete Zhao's memory from public consciousness include airbrushing his picture from photographs released in China, deleting his name from textbooks, and forbidding the media from mentioning him in any way. These efforts expanded to Chinese online encyclopedia Baidu Baike, which did not have an entry for Zhao. This lasted until February 2012, when the page was unblocked for unknown reasons; according to World Journal, the page received over 2 million visits in a day, before it was blocked again.

Since 1989, one of the few publications that has printed a non-government-approved memorial praising Zhao's legacy has been Yanhuang Chunqiu, a magazine which released a pro-Zhao article in July 2010. The article was written by Zhao's former aide, Yang Rudai.

=== Memoirs ===
On 14 May 2009, a published edition of Zhao's memoirs was released to the public, under the English title Prisoner of the State: The Secret Journal of Premier Zhao Ziyang. The 306-page book was crafted over four years from tapes recorded in secret by Zhao while under house arrest. In the last chapter, Zhao praises the Western system of parliamentary democracy and says it is the only way China can solve its problems of corruption and a growing gap between the rich and poor.

Zhao's published autobiography is based on approximately thirty cassette tapes which Zhao secretly recorded between 1999 and 2000. According to Zhao's friend and former co-worker, Du Daozheng, Zhao only recorded the tapes after being convinced by his friends to do so. The tapes were smuggled out to Hong Kong by Zhao's friends, one of which was Bao Tong. The tapes were then translated to English by his son Bao Pu, who then approached Adi Ignatius to edit the memoir in 2008. The material in his biography was largely consistent with the information from the "Tiananmen Papers", an unauthorized collection of Chinese government documents published in 2001. The book was also consistent with material from "Captive Conversations", a record of conversations between Zhao and his friend Zong Fengming, which was published only in Chinese.

Prisoner of the State contained minor historical errors, which commenters noted may reflect how out of touch China's leaders are with Chinese society. Although the Beijing populace did spontaneously attempt to block Chinese troops' entrance into Beijing, Zhao's assertion that "groups of old ladies and children slept in the roads" was not correct. Zhao noted that the astrophysicist Fang Lizhi (the Chinese government's most wanted dissident following the Tiananmen Protests) was out of the country in 1989 and publicly critical of Deng Xiaoping, when in fact Fang was living just outside Beijing and deliberately kept silent about politics during the 1989 protests.

As of 2009 his memoir was being sold (in both Chinese and English) in Hong Kong but not in mainland China, though a Microsoft Word document containing the memoir's entire Chinese-language text became available on the Internet and was downloaded widely throughout mainland China.

The recordings highlighted Zhao's heavy Henan accent (Central Plains Mandarin), making his Mandarin at times hard to follow.

== See also ==
- Politics of China
- History of the People's Republic of China
- Censorship in the People's Republic of China
- Internet censorship in the People's Republic of China
- Human rights in the People's Republic of China
- List of Chinese pro-democracy activists

Party political offices
Preceded by Tao Zhu	Secretary of the CCP Guangdong Committee; 1965–1967	Succeeded by Huang Yongsheng
Preceded by Ding Sheng	First Secretary of the CCP Guangdong Committee; 1974–1975	Succeeded by Wei Guoqing
Preceded by Liu Xingyuan	First Secretary of the CCP Sichuan Committee; 1975–1980	Succeeded by Tan Qilong
New title	Leader of the Leading Group for Financial and Economic Affairs; 1980–1989	Vacant Title next held by Jiang Zemin (from 1992)
Preceded by Hu Yaobang	General Secretary of the Chinese Communist Party; 1987–1989	Succeeded by Jiang Zemin
Government offices
Preceded by Ding Sheng	Governor of Guangdong; 1974–1975	Succeeded by Wei Guoqing
Preceded by Liu Xingyuan	Governor of Sichuan; 1975–1980	Succeeded by Lu Dadong
Preceded by Hua Guofeng	Premier of the State Council; 1980–1987	Succeeded by Li Peng
Order of precedence
Preceded by Deng Xiaoping as Chairman of the Central Military Commission (3rd-ranked)	Orders of precedence in the People's Republic of China (Premier of the State Council; 4th-ranked); 1982–1985	Succeeded by Li Xiannian as President (5th-ranked)
Preceded by Deng Xiaoping as Chairman of the Central Military Commission (2nd-ranked)	Orders of precedence in the People's Republic of China (Premier of the State Council; 3rd-ranked); 1985–1987	Succeeded by Li Xiannian as President (4th-ranked)
First	Orders of precedence in the People's Republic of China (General Secretary of the Communist Party; 1st-ranked); 1987–1989	Succeeded by Deng Xiaoping as Chairman of the Central Military Commission (2nd-ranked)
