= Jin'an, Lu'an =

Jin'an 金安区
- District
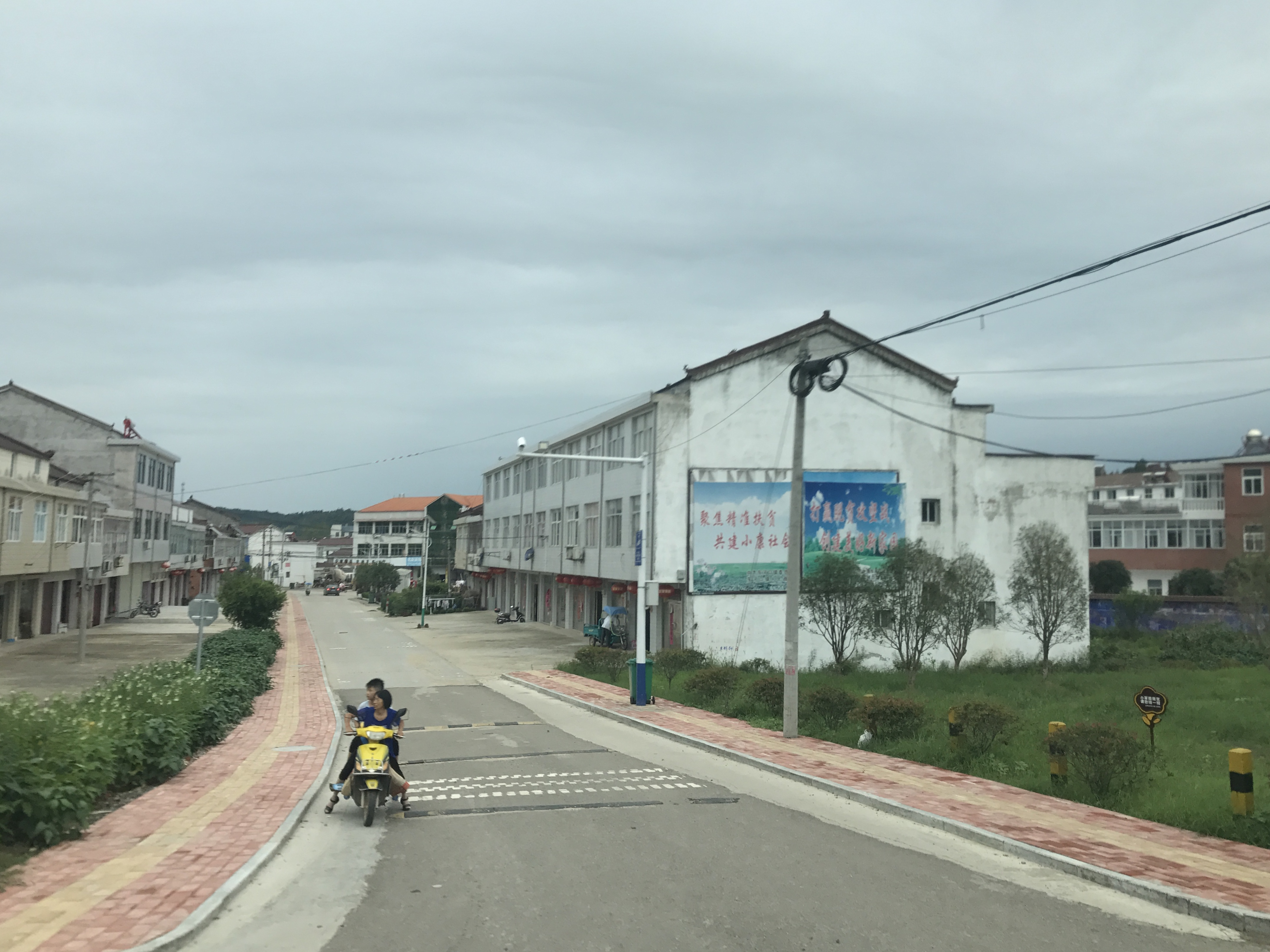
- Interactive map of Jin'an
- Coordinates: 31°44′57″N 116°32′23″E
- Country: People's Republic of China
- Province: Anhui
- Prefecture-level city: Lu'an

Area
  - Total: 1,657 km^{2} (640 sq mi)

Population (2017)
  - Total: 845,000
  - Density: 510/km^{2} (1,320/sq mi)
- Time zone: UTC+8 (China Standard)
- Postal code: 237005

Jin'an District (simplified Chinese: 金安区; traditional Chinese: 金安區; pinyin: Jīn'ān Qū) is a district of the city of Lu'an, Anhui Province, People's Republic of China. It has a population of 830,000 and an area of 1,654 square kilometres (639 sq mi). The government of Jin'an District is located on Renmin St.

The district has jurisdiction over three subdistricts, 11 towns and 14 townships.

== Administrative divisions ==
In the present, Jin'an District hasfive subdistricts, 11 towns and six townships.

Subdistricts

- Wangcheng (望城街道)
- Qingshuihe (清水河街道)
- Zhongshi (中市街道)
- Sanliqiao (三里桥街道)
- Dongshi (东市街道)

Towns

- Zhangdian (张店镇)
- Maotanchang (毛坦厂镇)
- Shiqiao (施桥镇)
- Chunshu (椿树镇)
- Dongqiao (东桥镇)
- Sungang (孙岗镇)
- Matou (马头镇)
- Donghekou (东河口镇)
- Muchang (木厂镇)
- Sanshipu (三十铺镇)
- Shuanghe (双河镇)

Townships

- Zhongdian (中店乡)
- Chengbei (城北乡)
- Xianshengdian (先生店乡)
- Weidong (渭东乡)
- Wengdun (翁墩乡)
- Hengtanggang (横塘岗乡)
