= Yanhuang Chunqiu =

Chinese magazine

- Language: Chinese
- Edited by: Jia Leilei

Publication details
- History: 1991–present
- Frequency: Monthly

Links
- Journal homepage

Yanhuang Chunqiu (Chinese: 炎黄春秋; pinyin: Yánhuáng Chūnqiū), sometimes translated as China Through the Ages, is a monthly journal in the People's Republic of China that was historically commonly identified as liberal and reformist. It was started in 1991, with the support of Xiao Ke, a liberal general of China's People's Liberation Army. Du Daozheng served as the founding director of the publisher.

It was previously regarded as one of the most influential liberal journals in China, issuing some 200,000 copies per month. It paused its operations in 2016, however, after a crackdown from CCP general secretary Xi Jinping's administration. Following the pause, a new management team with editors supporting Xi Jinping was introduced, and it continued to be published.

== History ==
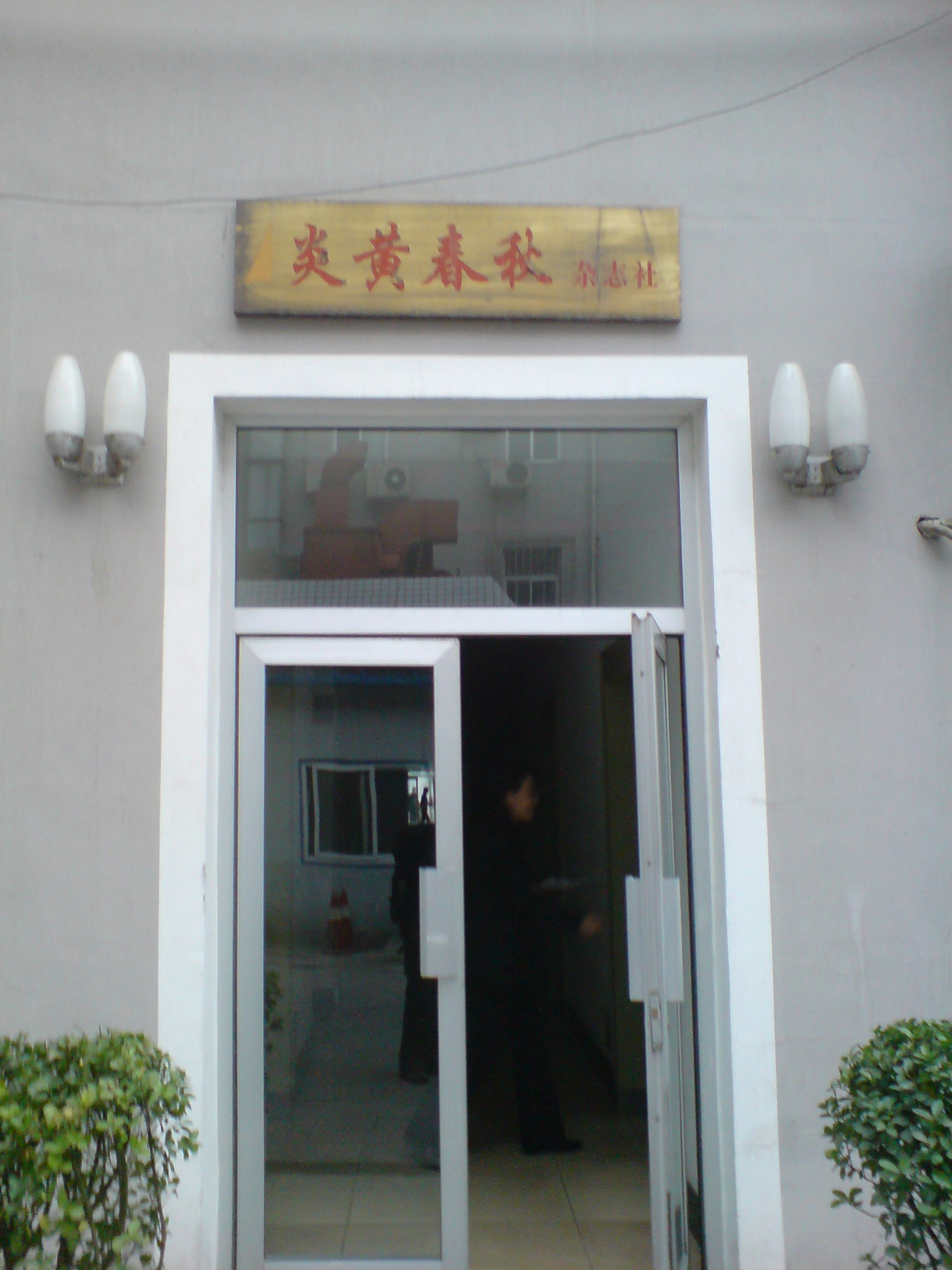
Entrance into the publisher.

=== Founding ===
In 1990, Xiao Ke, a liberal General of the People's Liberation Army and standing member of the Central Advisory Commission, together with other officials, began to organize the launch of a history journal. In March 1991, the credentials for publication were approved, and in April all personnel of the publisher started to work in Beijing.

On July 1, 1991, Yanhuang Chunqiu published its first issue. Du Daozheng served as the founding director of the publisher. In early 1992, after Deng Xiaoping's southern tour, Yanhuang Chunqiu began to publish articles in support of the Reforms and Opening-up program. In 2001, Xi Zhongxun, a leading reformist and the father of Xi Jinping, publicly supported and praised the journal.

Xie Tao's 2007 article Only Social Democracy Can Save China prompted renewed debate in China on the idea of social democracy.

=== Political interference ===
In July 2010, Yanhuang Chunqiu published a memoir by retired CCP Politburo member Yang Rudai praising Zhao Ziyang. It marked a rare break of the long-standing taboo in China against mentioning the former leader since he was ousted after the Tiananmen Square protests of 1989.

In January 2013, Yanhuang Chunqiu's website was temporarily shut down by the Chinese government after it had published an editorial urging the implementation of constitutional rights.

In July 2015, the founding publisher, Du Daozheng, had taken up the role of editor-in-chief, when Yang Jisheng was forced to resign. In connection with his resignation, Yang published two letters: the first explained the reasons for his resignation to the members of Yanhuang Chunqiu and its readers; the second was sent to the General Administration of Press and Publication and criticized intensified government restrictions on topics that the magazine was permitted to cover.

In 2016, China's media regulator, the State Administration of Press, Publication, Radio, Film and Television, declared 37 recent news items in breach of political guidelines.

=== Suspension of publication ===
The journal was long considered influential among liberals and reformists, but the entire editorial team resigned in July 2016 following the sacking of the longtime publisher, Du Daozheng, and demotion of the chief editor, Xu Qingquan, by order of the Chinese National Academy of Arts, amid intensifying pressure from the authorities to soften its editorial stance. The magazine had been founded in 1991 by reform-minded party veterans, including the efforts of General Xiao Ke, and had a circulation of around 200,000.

The July 2016 restrictions led the magazine's editorial staff to announce that the magazine could no longer be published, as the academy had unilaterally abandoned an agreement allowing its publication within defined bounds. They further revealed that academy staff had seized control of the Yanhuang Chunqiu website at the magazine's offices. China Digital Times, a website based in the United States that is focused on censorship in China, reported that as an attempt to resist the change, some senior staff attempted to withhold financial records, office keys, and the magazine's official seal to prevent those affiliated with the academy from using them. Nevertheless, it appeared that publication would continue, under staff from the academy including Jia Leilei, its former vice-president.

After he was dismissed, Du announced that the publication had been suspended, and said the closure resembled methods used in the Cultural Revolution.

=== Post-suspension ===
After it had been suspended, a new management team with editors supporting Xi Jinping was introduced and continued to be published. Wang Yanjun, the magazine's former deputy editor, called the first edition after the changes "fake" and "diametrically opposite to the spirit of our magazine". A writer for the China Digital Times called the changes "a hostile takeover" and added that the journal, once a "maverick", had been "neutered".

As of May 2024, Yanhuang Chunqiu continues to be published, with Jia Leilei serving as editor-in-chief.
