= Foziling Reservoir =

- 佛子岭水库 (Chinese)
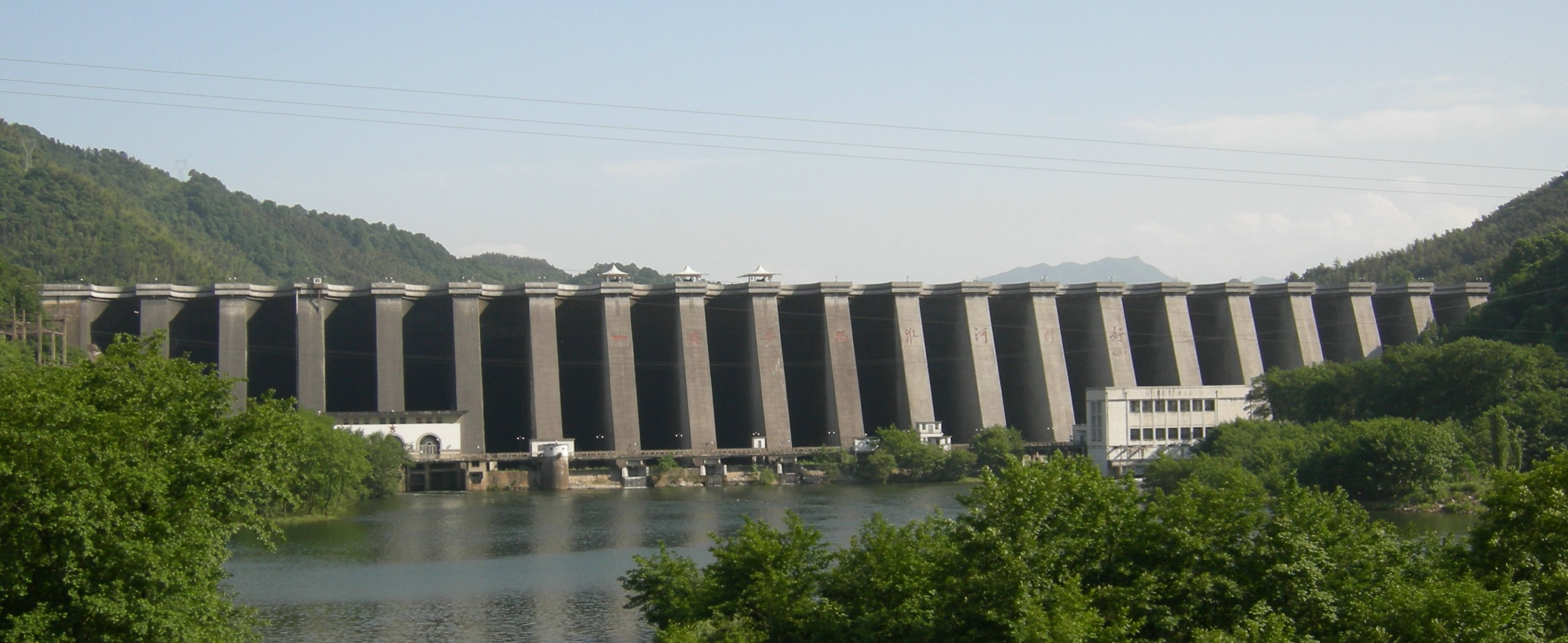
- Dam of Foziling Reservoir in May 2006

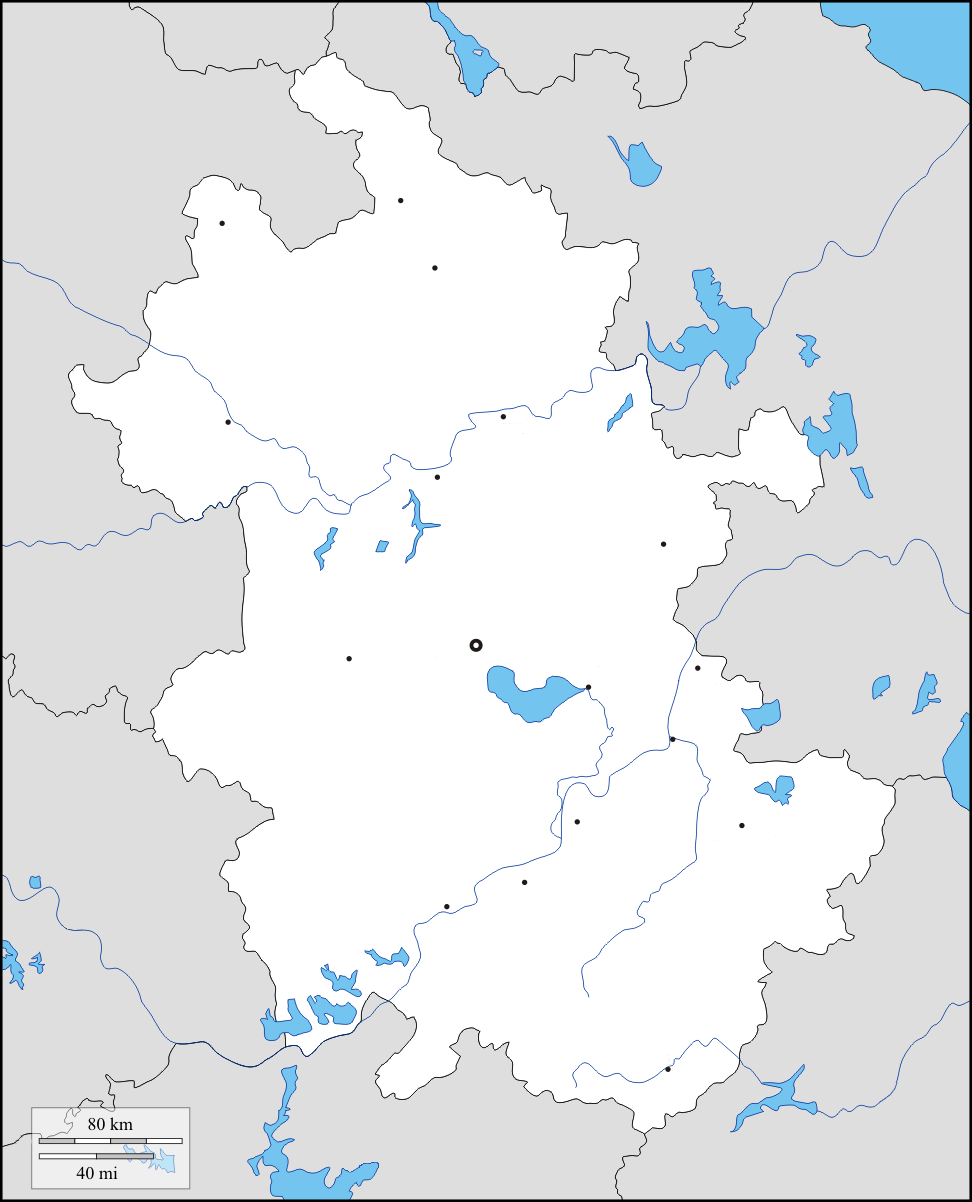
- Location in Anhui
- Location: Huoshan County, Anhui, China
- Coordinates: 31°20′46″N 116°16′22″E
- Type: Reservoir
- Primary outflows: Pi River
- Basin countries: China
- Built: January 1952–November 1954
- First flooded: 1955
- Surface area: 1,270 square kilometres (310,000 acres)
- Max. depth: 74.4 m (244 ft)
- Water volume: 405,000,000 m^{3} (0.097 cu mi)

Foziling Reservoir (simplified Chinese: 佛子岭水库; traditional Chinese: 佛子嶺水庫; pinyin: Fózǐlǐng Shuǐkù) is a reservoir located in Huoshan County, Anhui, China.

== History ==
The reservoir project began in January 1952 and completed in November 1954, taking two years and ten months. It is the first large-scale water conservancy and hydropower project built after the founding of the Communist State, and Chinese official media call it "the first dam in New China".

== Function ==
The reservoir provides drinking water for locals, and has also become a place for recreation for nearby residents.

== See also ==
- List of protected areas of China
