= Huoshan County =

Huoshan 霍山县 Hwoshan
- County
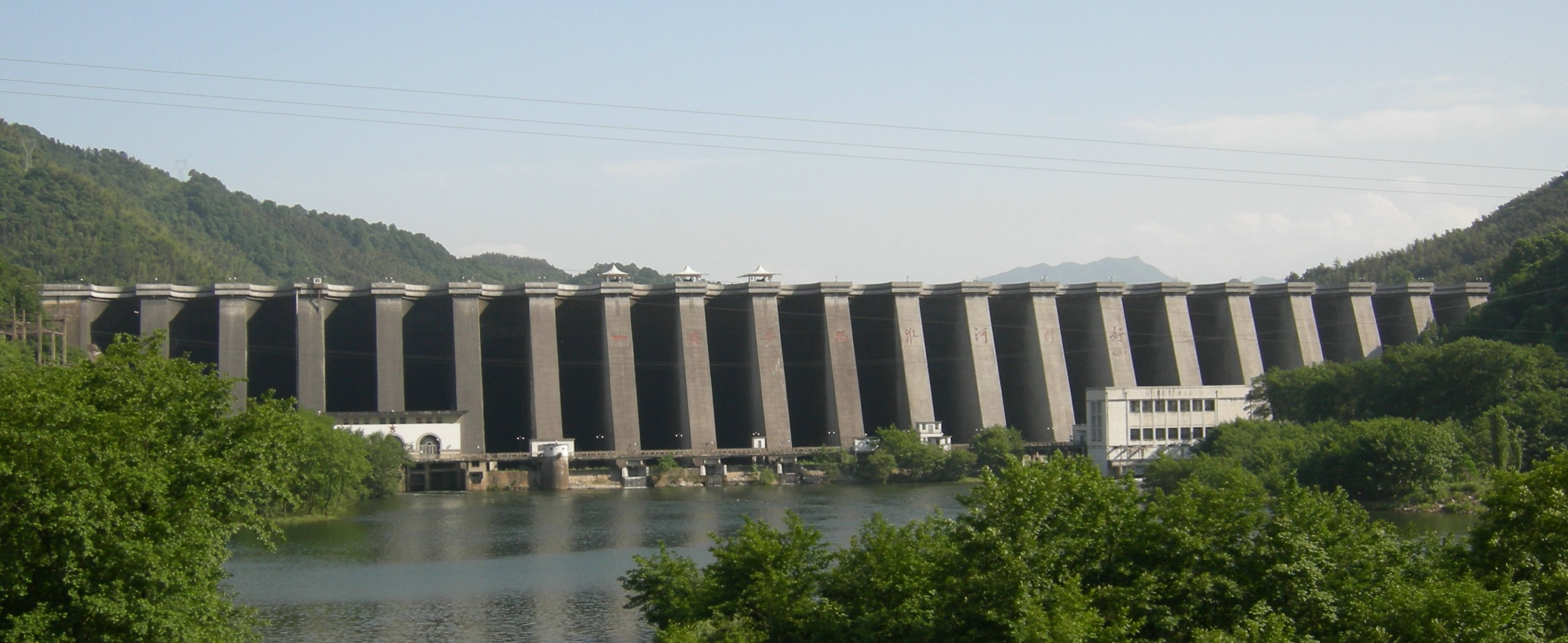
- Foziling Dam of Huoshan County
- Interactive map of Huoshan
- Coordinates: 31°16′N 116°16′E
- Country: People's Republic of China
- Province: Anhui
- Prefecture: Lu'an

Area
  - Total: 2,043 km^{2} (789 sq mi)

Population (2018)
  - Total: 370,000
  - Density: 180/km^{2} (470/sq mi)
- Time zone: UTC+8 (China Standard)
- Postal code: 362595
- Area code: 0564
- Website: huoshan.gov.cn

Huoshan (Chinese: 霍山; pinyin: Huòshān) is a county of western Anhui province, People's Republic of China, and is under the jurisdiction of Lu'an City. It has a population of 370,000 and an area of 2,042 square kilometres (788 sq mi). The government of Huoshan County is located in Hengshan Town.

Huoshan County has jurisdiction over nine towns and sixteen townships.

The county has a long history, going back over 2,000 years with name "Huoshan" first being used during the Sui dynasty.

== Geography ==
Foziling Reservoir is a vast reservoir in the county.

=== Climate ===
Huoshan County has a monsoon-influenced humid subtropical climate (Köppen climate classification Cfa), cool, sometimes cold, winters, and hot and humid summers. The monthly 24-hour average temperature ranges from 2.6 °C (36.7 °F) in January to 27.7 °C (81.9 °F) in July, and the annual mean is 15.58 °C (60.0 °F). A majority of the annual precipitation occurs from May to August. With monthly percent possible sunshine ranging from 34% in March to 47% in August, the county receives 1,844 hours of bright sunshine annually.

Climate data for Huoshan County, elevation 86 m (282 ft), (1991–2020 normals, extremes 1954–present)
| Month | Jan | Feb | Mar | Apr | May | Jun | Jul | Aug | Sep | Oct | Nov | Dec | Year |
|---|---|---|---|---|---|---|---|---|---|---|---|---|---|
| Record high °C (°F) | 26.7 (80.1) | 28.8 (83.8) | 36.6 (97.9) | 37.4 (99.3) | 40.0 (104.0) | 39.0 (102.2) | 41.6 (106.9) | 43.3 (109.9) | 40.1 (104.2) | 40.4 (104.7) | 31.2 (88.2) | 25.9 (78.6) | 43.3 (109.9) |
| Mean daily maximum °C (°F) | 8.0 (46.4) | 11.0 (51.8) | 16.3 (61.3) | 22.9 (73.2) | 27.4 (81.3) | 30.1 (86.2) | 33.1 (91.6) | 31.8 (89.2) | 27.7 (81.9) | 22.7 (72.9) | 16.8 (62.2) | 10.6 (51.1) | 21.5 (70.8) |
| Daily mean °C (°F) | 2.7 (36.9) | 5.4 (41.7) | 10.4 (50.7) | 16.7 (62.1) | 21.6 (70.9) | 25.0 (77.0) | 28.0 (82.4) | 26.9 (80.4) | 22.3 (72.1) | 16.6 (61.9) | 10.4 (50.7) | 4.7 (40.5) | 15.9 (60.6) |
| Mean daily minimum °C (°F) | −0.8 (30.6) | 1.5 (34.7) | 5.7 (42.3) | 11.5 (52.7) | 16.7 (62.1) | 20.9 (69.6) | 24.1 (75.4) | 23.4 (74.1) | 18.7 (65.7) | 12.4 (54.3) | 6.0 (42.8) | 0.7 (33.3) | 11.7 (53.1) |
| Record low °C (°F) | −17.4 (0.7) | −14.2 (6.4) | −7.8 (18.0) | −1.3 (29.7) | 2.0 (35.6) | 10.9 (51.6) | 15.5 (59.9) | 15.1 (59.2) | 8.0 (46.4) | −1.1 (30.0) | −6.1 (21.0) | −14.9 (5.2) | −17.4 (0.7) |
| Average precipitation mm (inches) | 63.4 (2.50) | 69.3 (2.73) | 99.6 (3.92) | 104.2 (4.10) | 128.0 (5.04) | 197.9 (7.79) | 221.8 (8.73) | 221.3 (8.71) | 116.4 (4.58) | 74.2 (2.92) | 65.7 (2.59) | 41.9 (1.65) | 1,403.7 (55.26) |
| Average precipitation days (≥ 0.1 mm) | 10.3 | 10.5 | 12.3 | 11.4 | 12.8 | 12.7 | 13.9 | 15.5 | 11.8 | 10.1 | 9.5 | 8.4 | 139.2 |
| Average snowy days | 4.9 | 3.3 | 1.0 | 0 | 0 | 0 | 0 | 0 | 0 | 0 | 0.5 | 2.1 | 11.8 |
| Average relative humidity (%) | 80 | 79 | 75 | 73 | 75 | 80 | 81 | 84 | 83 | 82 | 80 | 78 | 79 |
| Mean monthly sunshine hours | 106.3 | 105.8 | 134.6 | 160.6 | 167.3 | 149.8 | 179.0 | 159.4 | 138.2 | 144.7 | 135.4 | 122.7 | 1,703.8 |
| Percentage possible sunshine | 33 | 34 | 36 | 41 | 39 | 35 | 42 | 39 | 38 | 41 | 43 | 39 | 38 |
Source: China Meteorological Administration extremes

== Administrative divisions ==
In the present, Huoshan County has 12 towns and 4 townships.

12 Towns

- Hengshan (衡山镇)
- Danjiamiao (但家庙镇)
- Foziling (佛子岭镇)
- Heishidu (黑石渡镇)
- Luo'erling (落儿岭镇)
- Xiafuqiao (下符桥镇)
- Shangtushi (上土市镇)
- Yu'erjie (与儿街镇)
- Manshuihe (漫水河镇)
- Mozitan (磨子潭镇)
- Zhufo'an (诸佛庵镇)
- Dahuaping (大化坪镇)

4 Townships

- Taipingfan (太平畈乡)
- Dongxixi (东西溪乡)
- Danlongsi (单龙寺乡)
- Taiyang (太阳乡)
