= Lu'an =

Lu'an 六安市 Liuan
- Prefecture-level city
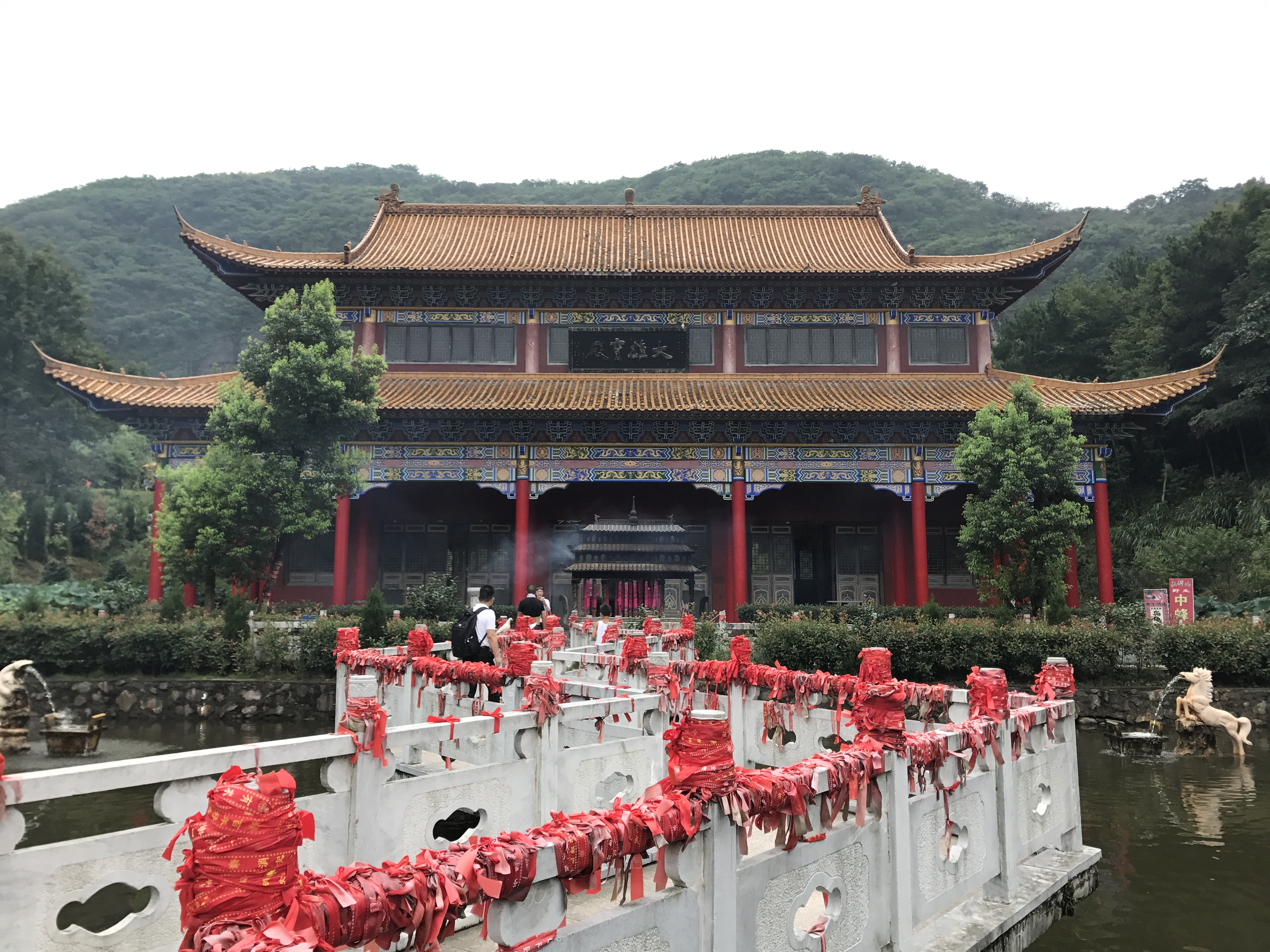
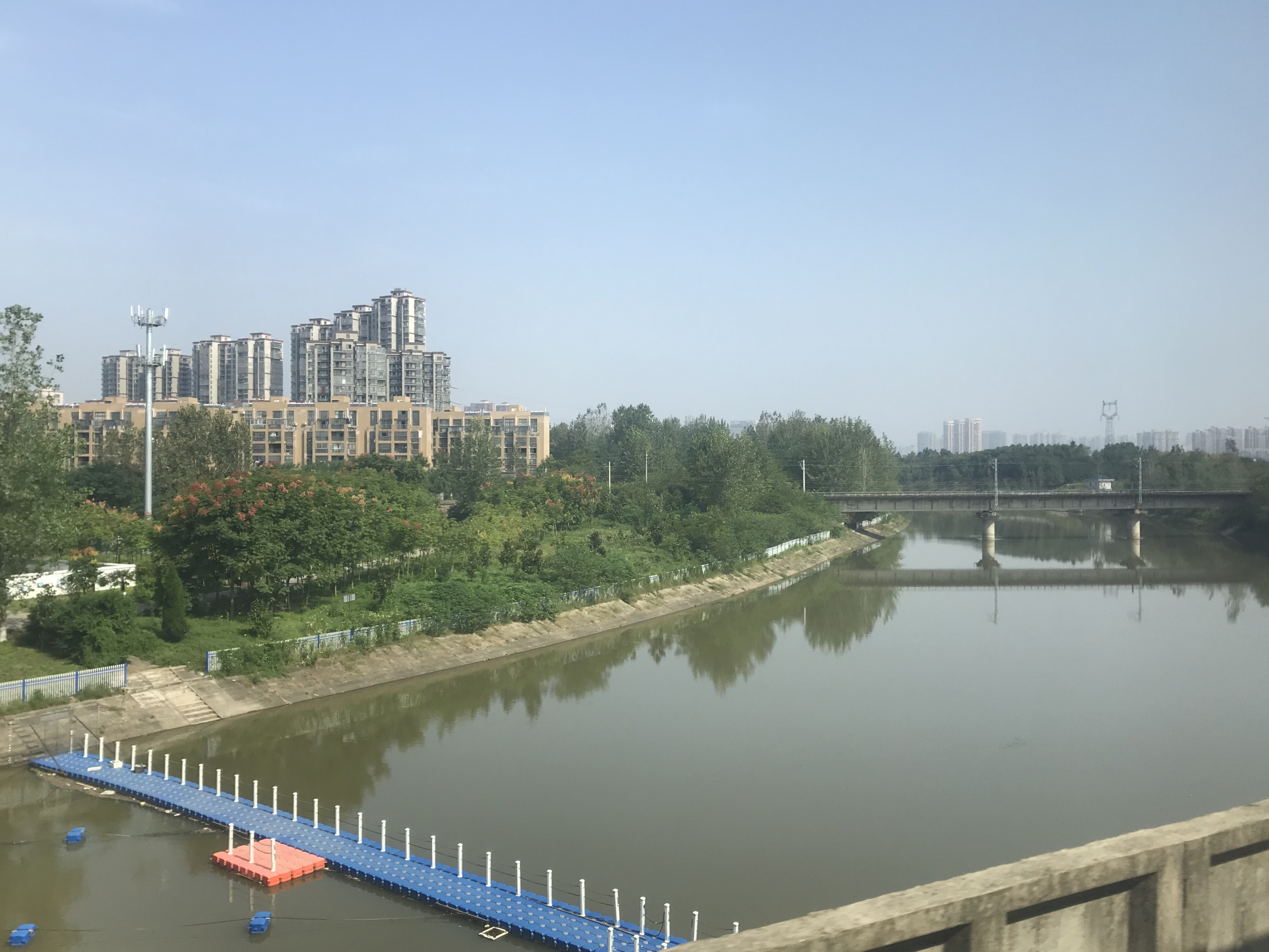
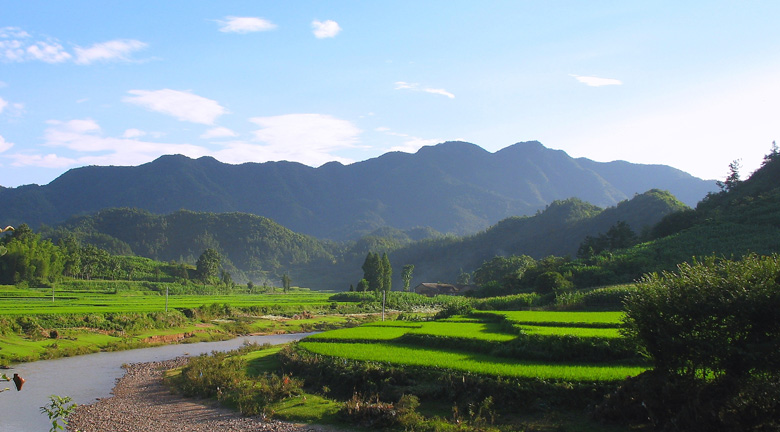
- From top, left to right: Tianfo Temple, Dabieshan Grottoes; Pihe River in Yu'an; Dabie Mountains in Huoshan County

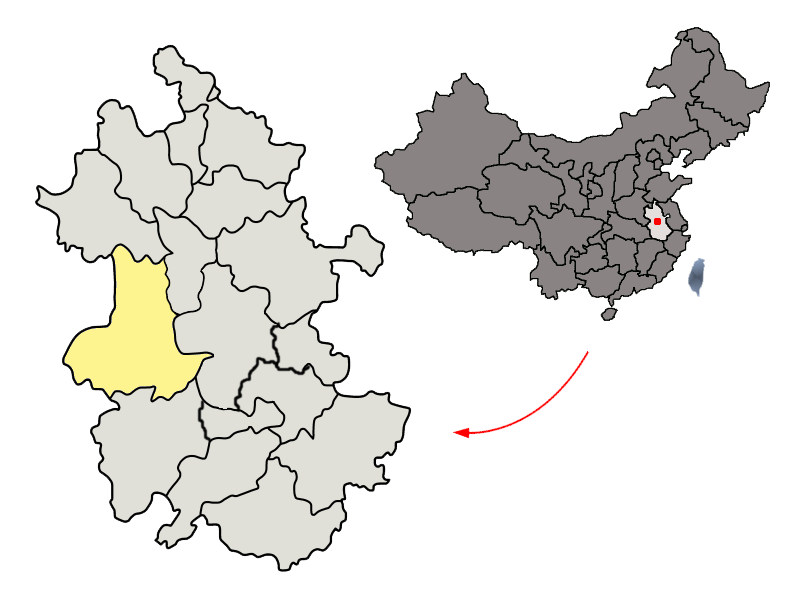
- Coordinates (Lu'an municipal government): 31°44′10″N 116°31′12″E
- Country: People's Republic of China
- Province: Anhui
- County-level divisions: 7
- Township-level divisions: 196
- Municipal seat: Jin'an District

Government
  - CPC Secretary: Fang Zheng (方正)
  - Mayor: Dongxu Pan (潘东旭)

Area
  - Prefecture-level city: 15,436 km^{2} (5,960 sq mi)
  - Urban: 4,127.5 km^{2} (1,593.6 sq mi)
  - Metro: 3,561 km^{2} (1,375 sq mi)

Population (2020 census)
  - Prefecture-level city: 4,393,699
  - Density: 284.64/km^{2} (737.21/sq mi)
  - Urban: 1,968,766
  - Urban density: 476.99/km^{2} (1,235.4/sq mi)
  - Metro: 1,752,537
  - Metro density: 492.1/km^{2} (1,275/sq mi)

GDP
  - Prefecture-level city: CN¥ 192.3 billion US$ 24.2 billion
  - Per capita: CN¥ 43,666; US$ 6,769
- Time zone: UTC+8 (CST)
- Postal code: 237000
- Area code: 0564
- ISO 3166 code: CN-AH-15
- License Plate Prefix: 皖N
- Administrative division code: 341500

Lu'an (Chinese: 六安; pinyin: Lù'ān) is a prefecture-level city in western Anhui province, People's Republic of China, bordering Henan to the northwest and Hubei to the southwest. As of the 2020 census, it had a total population of 4,393,699 inhabitants whom 1,752,537 lived in the built-up (or metro) area made of Yu'an and Jin'an urban districts. Neighbouring prefecture-level cities are the provincial capital of Hefei to the east, Anqing to the south, Huanggang (Hubei) and Xinyang (Henan) to the west, and Huainan and Fuyang to the north. Although the character 六 (literally: "six") is normally pronounced "Liù", in this case it changes to "Lù" on account of the historical literary reading.

Lu'an, also known as "Gaocheng". Located in the west of Anhui Province, between the Yangtze River and the Huaihe River, at the northern foot of the Dabie Mountains, "Western Anhui" in the geographical sense refers specifically to Lu'an. You can experience a wide variety of activies, such as enjoying flowers and birds, but also mountain climbing and rafting. At the same time, Lu'an has many cultural relics and historic sites.

== History ==
In 121 AD, Emperor Wu of the Han Dynasty took the meaning of "safety in the six places" and established the Liu'an Kingdom in the second year of Yuanxing. The name "Liu'an" is still used today. Because Shun granted Gaotao the title of Liu (Lù), later generations called Liu'an Gaocheng.

During the Xia and Shang Dynasties, Liu was a country south of the Huaihe River. From the Western Zhou Dynasty to the Spring and Autumn Period, there were many feudal states, and the territory of Ying, Liu, Liao, Qunshu and other vassal states were formed successively. During the Warring States Period, the princes merged and became subordinate to Wu and Chu successively.

During the Qin Dynasty, six counties were established, which belonged to Jiujiang County. The Western Han Dynasty established Liu'an Kingdom, and the Eastern Han Dynasty established Liu'an County, named after the ancient Six Kingdoms. In the Sui Dynasty, Shouzhou was established. In the eighth year of Zhenghe of the Song Dynasty (1118), the Lu'an Army was established. In the Yuan Dynasty, it was called Liu'an Prefecture and belonged to Luzhou Road. It belonged to Luzhou Prefecture in the Ming Dynasty and Zhili Prefecture in the Qing Dynasty.

In December 1992, Lu'an City and Lu'an County merged and were called Lu'an City (county level). In September 1999, the State Council approved the withdrawal of land from Lu'an to establish a city. The original county-level Lu'an City was divided into Jin'an District and Yu'an District. In March 2000, the provincial-level Lu'an City was officially established.

== Population ==
At the end of 2023 and the beginning of 2024, Lu'an City has a permanent population of 4.343 million people and an urbanization rate of 51.41%.

Among the city's permanent population, 2.233 million people live in cities and towns, accounting for 51.41% of the total population; 2.110 million people live in rural areas, accounting for 48.59% of the total population. There are 2.239 million men, accounting for 51.56% of the total population; there are 2.104 million women, accounting for 48.44% of the total population. The sex ratio is 106.46.

== Geography and climate ==
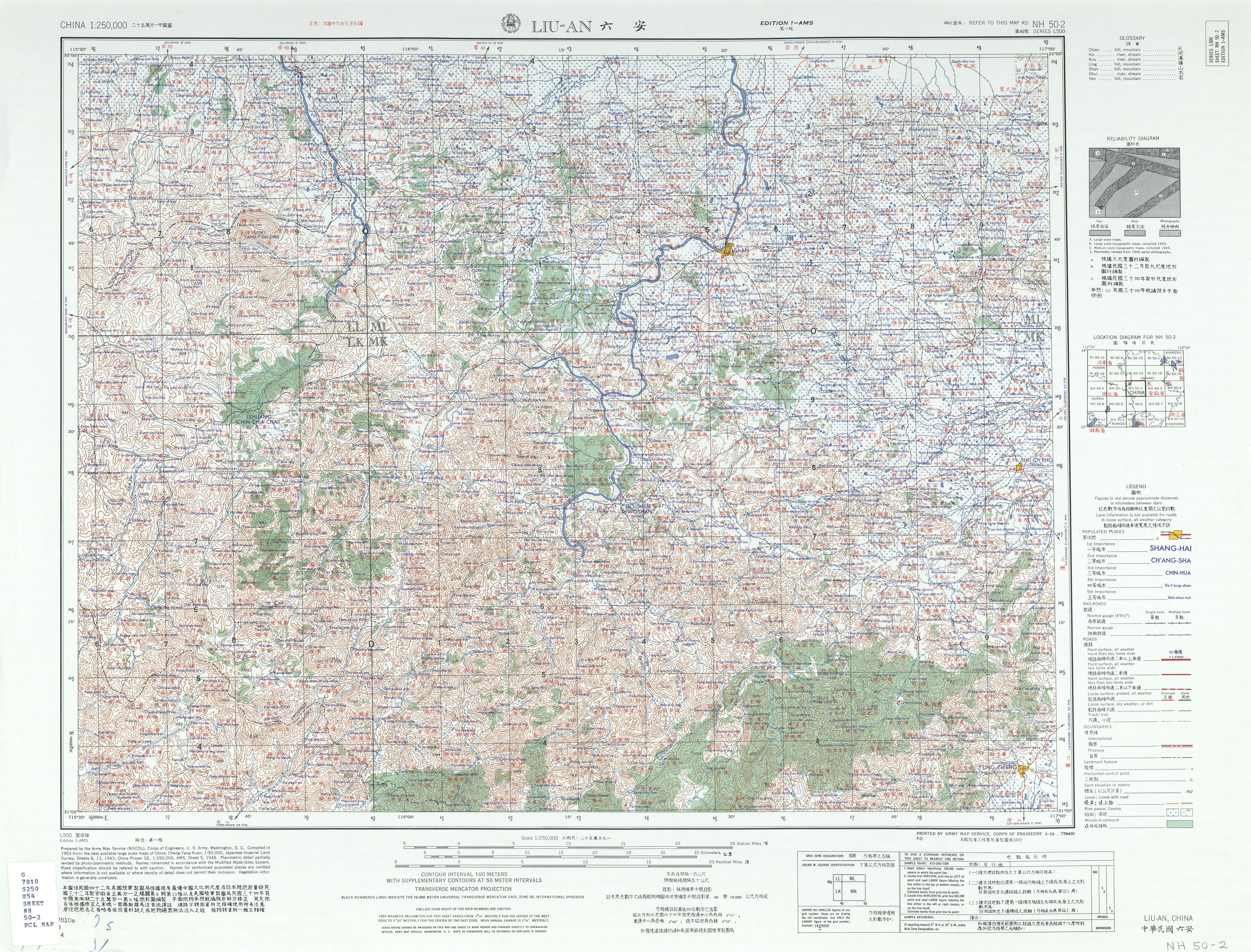
Map including Lu'an (labeled as LIU-AN 六安) (AMS, 1953)

Lu'an is marked by the southern fringes of the North China Plain in its north and the northern part of the Dabie Mountains in its south. Its administrative area spans 31°01′−32°40′ N latitude and 115°20′−117°14′ E longitude, respectively.

Lu'an has a monsoon-influenced, humid subtropical climate (Köppen Cfa), with four distinct seasons. Winters are cold and damp, with average low temperatures in January dipping just below freezing; the January 24-hour average temperature is 3.1 °C (37.6 °F). Summers are typically hot and humid, with a July average of 28.2 °C (82.8 °F). The annual mean is 16.4 °C (61.5 °F), while annual precipitation averages just above 1,139.6 mm (45 in), a majority of which occurs from June to August. Annual sunshine duration is 1,920.9 hours.

The terrain is high in the southwest and flat in the northeast, distributed in a trapezoid shape, forming three natural areas: mountains, hills, and plains.

Climate data for Lu'an, elevation 74 m (243 ft), (1991–2020 normals, extremes 1955–present)
Month	Jan	Feb	Mar	Apr	May	Jun	Jul	Aug	Sep	Oct	Nov	Dec	Year
Record high °C (°F)	24.3 (75.7)	29.7 (85.5)	37.2 (99.0)	37.6 (99.7)	37.6 (99.7)	38.4 (101.1)	40.6 (105.1)	41.5 (106.7)	40.0 (104.0)	40.7 (105.3)	31.7 (89.1)	25.7 (78.3)	41.5 (106.7)
Mean daily maximum °C (°F)	7.2 (45.0)	10.3 (50.5)	15.6 (60.1)	22.3 (72.1)	27.0 (80.6)	29.6 (85.3)	32.6 (90.7)	31.6 (88.9)	27.7 (81.9)	22.5 (72.5)	16.3 (61.3)	9.8 (49.6)	21.0 (69.9)
Daily mean °C (°F)	3.1 (37.6)	5.8 (42.4)	10.7 (51.3)	17.0 (62.6)	22.0 (71.6)	25.3 (77.5)	28.2 (82.8)	27.3 (81.1)	23.1 (73.6)	17.6 (63.7)	11.3 (52.3)	5.3 (41.5)	16.4 (61.5)
Mean daily minimum °C (°F)	0.1 (32.2)	2.5 (36.5)	6.9 (44.4)	12.6 (54.7)	17.8 (64.0)	21.8 (71.2)	24.9 (76.8)	24.2 (75.6)	19.7 (67.5)	13.8 (56.8)	7.5 (45.5)	2.1 (35.8)	12.8 (55.1)
Record low °C (°F)	−18.9 (−2.0)	−18.8 (−1.8)	−10.0 (14.0)	−0.7 (30.7)	4.6 (40.3)	12.1 (53.8)	17.3 (63.1)	15.3 (59.5)	8.6 (47.5)	1.5 (34.7)	−5.4 (22.3)	−14.7 (5.5)	−18.9 (−2.0)
Average precipitation mm (inches)	52.3 (2.06)	53.0 (2.09)	84.3 (3.32)	88.7 (3.49)	101.6 (4.00)	156.4 (6.16)	214.2 (8.43)	150.7 (5.93)	83.8 (3.30)	60.1 (2.37)	59.5 (2.34)	35.0 (1.38)	1,139.6 (44.87)
Average precipitation days (≥ 0.1 mm)	9.1	9.3	11.5	10.4	11.4	11.1	12.9	12.6	9.9	9.1	9.1	7.5	123.9
Average snowy days	5.0	3.0	1.1	0	0	0	0	0	0	0	0.5	1.7	11.3
Average relative humidity (%)	73	72	70	68	70	77	79	81	77	73	72	70	74
Mean monthly sunshine hours	121.0	122.0	152.8	183.1	190.7	171.4	196.9	181.0	154.9	159.8	150.5	136.8	1,920.9
Percentage possible sunshine	38	39	41	47	45	40	46	44	42	46	48	44	43
Source 1: China Meteorological Administration
Source 2: Weather China

== Administration ==
The prefecture-level city of Lu'an administers seven county-level divisions, including three districts and four counties.

As of the end of 2022, Lu'an City governs 3 municipal districts of Jin'an, Yu'an and Yeji, 4 counties of Huoqiu, Jinzhai, Huoshan and Shucheng, as well as the national-level Lu'an Economic and Technological Development Zone; it has 10 sub-districts, 95 towns, 35 townships, a total of 140 towns (streets); a total of 174 urban community residents' committees and 1,795 villagers' committees.

The city's total area is 15,450.9016 square kilometers. Among them, there are 6618.98 hectares of wetland, 497245.32 hectares of cultivated land, 49507.09 hectares of garden land, 626483.09 hectares of forest land, 5786.65 hectares of grassland, 159656.48 hectares of urban, village and industrial and mining land, 29053.67 hectares of transportation land, and 152606.61 hectares of water and water conservancy facilities land.

Map
Name	Simplified Chinese	Hanyu Pinyin	Population (2015)	Area (km^{2})	Density (/km^{2})
Districts
Jin'an District	金安区	Jīn'ān Qū	878,600	1653.58	531
Yu'an District	裕安区	Yù'ān Qū	1,024,600	1925.61	532
Yeji District	叶集区	Yèjí Qū	168,000	555.17	302
Counties
Huoqiu County	霍邱县	Huòqiū Xiàn	1,702,200	3248.16	524
Shucheng County	舒城县	Shūchéng Xiàn	995,000	2109.77	471
Jinzhai County	金寨县	Jīnzhài Xiàn	674,400	3914.74	172
Huoshan County	霍山县	Huòshān Xiàn	362,600	2040.42	177

These are further divided into 142 township-level divisions.

== Transport ==
=== Railway ===
- Ningxi Railway: Runs east–west through the city, with stations at Yeji, Yaolimiao, Lu'an, and Dushan (freight).
- Hewu Railway: A 250 km/h passenger-dedicated line, with stations at Jinzhai and Lu'an.
- Fuliu Railway: Connects to the Fuyang hub in the north and links with the Ningxi Railway in the south, with stations at Huoqiu and Wuji (freight).
- The Lu'an–Anqing Railway is under construction, designed for 250 km/h, with six stations planned.

=== Highways ===
- Expressways: G40 (Shanghai–Xi'an), G35 (Jinan–Guangzhou), G42 (Shanghai–Chengdu), G0321 (Dezhou–Shangrao), and G4222 (He County–Xiangyang)
- National Roads: G105, G206, G237, G312, and G346 pass through the area.

=== Aviation ===
Approximately 70 km (about a 50-minute drive) from Hefei Xinqiao International Airport (4E-class). A branch airport in Jinzhai is planned.

=== Water Transport ===
The Huoqiu section of the Huai River waterway is navigable for 2,000-tonne ships. The Zhouji Comprehensive Port is under construction, with a designed annual throughput capacity of over 5 million tonnes. It is planned to have four 1,000-tonne (structure designed for 2,000-tonne) berths, utilizing 360 meters of shoreline. The land area covers 167 acres, supporting facilities include bulk cargo warehouses, general cargo warehouses, storage yards, and office/production ancillary buildings.

== Economy ==
Lu'an has developed industries and has basically formed key industries such as iron ore metallurgy, food processing, machinery manufacturing, clothing and textiles, energy and electricity, and construction and building materials, and has initially established a regional trade and logistics center in the Dabie Mountains.

Lu'an is rich in resources. There are more than 10 million acres of vast mountain fields, nearly 4 million acres of arable water surface, and 12 billion cubic meters of surface water resources. Six major reservoirs have accumulated 7 billion cubic meters of high-quality water sources above Class II.

There are more than 40 kinds of metallic ores and non-metallic minerals. Among them, Huoqiu Iron Mine has proven reserves of more than 2 billion tons and prospective reserves of 3 billion tons, ranking first in East China and fifth in the country; Jinzhai Molybdenum Mine has proven reserves of more than 2.2 million tons. The potential mining value reaches 1 trillion yuan; Lu'an jade is of high quality and contains unlimited business opportunities.

== Specialty ==
Lu'an Guapian, a famous traditional Chinese tea and one of the top ten famous teas in China, is a green tea. Guapian or Piancha, for short, is produced in the Dabie Mountain area of Lu'an City, Anhui Province. It was called "Luzhou Lu'an Tea" in the Tang Dynasty and was a famous tea. Lu'an Guapian is produced in the Dabie Camellia Area in western Anhui, north of the Yangtze River and south of the Huaihe River. Lu'an and other places are the most famous, and are called Lu'an Guapian. The Dabie Mountains have high mountains, lots of clouds and mist, and high humidity. Together with the exquisite harvesting and processing, the quality is particularly excellent. Lu'an Guapian is melon seed-shaped and is a single piece of tender green tea. It has the characteristics of "emerald green color, clear aroma, fresh and sweet taste, green and clear soup color, and frequent brewing". Lu'an Guapian has a long history and rich cultural connotation. As early as the Tang Dynasty, Lu Yu's famous book "The Book of Tea" contains records about "Luzhou Liu'an Tea". Xu Guangqi, a scientist in the Ming Dynasty, said in his book "The Complete Book of Agriculture" that "the tea from Liu'an Prefecture is the best tea". During the Qing Dynasty, melon slices were listed as tribute.

Jinzhai kiwi is a specialty of Jinzhai County, Lu'an City, Anhui Province. The wild kiwi fruit in Jinzhai County is not very large and uneven in size. It has a sweet and sour taste, and is durable for storage.

== Food ==
Jinzhai chestnut cake is a local specialty made from the Jinzhai chestnut, made through a combination of traditional production techniques and Western pastry methods. The resulting chestnut cake has a crispy skin and sweet interior.

Jinzhai Shaobing is produced in Lu'an. Jinzhai Shaobing is also called Jinhua Crispy Cake. Its exterior is golden in color, crispy, sweet and round. An aroma of meat, dried plums and vegetables is prominent once bitten into.

Fried shredded chicken buns have thin skin and thick meat, crispy texture and strong fragrance.

== Notable people ==
Ying Bu was a famous general in the late Qin and early Han dynasties. He was previously one of Xiang Yu's generals. He once accompanied Xiang Yu to destroy Qin and was granted the title of King of Jiujiang. Later, he surrendered to Liu Bang and together with Han Xin destroyed Xiang Yu. After the establishment of the Han Dynasty, he was named King of Huainan by Liu Bang for his merits. Together with Han Xin and Peng Yue, he was named the three most famous generals in the early Han Dynasty. He was later killed for rebellion.

Duan Qirui (1865–1936), formerly known as Qirui and courtesy name Zhiquan, was known as the "Righteous Old Man" in his later years. He was a native of Liu'an County, Anhui (now Lu'an City). A famous politician in the Republic of China, known as the "Tiger of the North" and the leader of the Anhui warlords. The main target of Sun Yat-sen's "Dharma Protection Movement".

Fang Yong (1895–1956), courtesy name Jinglue, was born in Shouxian County. He devoted himself to the study of philology, read extensively about calligraphy and history, and made detailed textual research. He once made friends with Yi Baisha, a famous figure in Chinese studies. He has successively served as a lecturer and professor at Anhui University, editor of the Anhui Provisional General Chronicle Library, compiler of the National Translation and Translation Center, and professor of Anhui University of Political Science. After the Anti-Japanese War, he successively served as a Chinese language teacher in provincial and county middle schools. When students asked questions, he immediately answered them and pointed out the source. The students respected him and called it "the source of the word that fell off the page."
