= Talitha Gerlach =

American social worker

Talitha A. Gerlach
- Gerlach on Great Wall of China on 25 September 1983
- Born: 6 March 1896; Pittsburgh, US
- Died: 12 February 1995 (aged 98); Shanghai, China
- Occupation: YMCA worker

Talitha A. Gerlach (Chinese: 耿丽淑 – Geng Lishu; 6 March 1896 – 12 February 1995) was an American YWCA worker who spent most of her life as a social worker in Shanghai, China, where she died. She received various awards from the Shanghai and Chinese governments.

== Life ==
=== Early years (1896–1926) ===
Talitha Gerlach was born in Pittsburgh, to a family of German origin. She was the daughter of a Methodist minister and spent her childhood near Columbia, Ohio. She earned a bachelor's degree in social economics at the North Western Christian University (Butler College) in 1920. She intended to go into social work and joined the campus branch of the YWCA. She became a student adviser with the YWCA. She began work with the YWCA traveling in the Mid-West of the United States. In 1923 she met Ida Pruitt, who had grown up in China, where her parents were Southern Baptist missionaries. Pruitt influenced her to accept a position as a YWCA foreign secretary in China.

=== Shanghai YWCA (1926–40) ===
Gerlach went to Shanghai in 1926 to organize a YWCA office. In April 1927 she met and befriended the YWCA secretary Maud Russell, who had been forced to leave Wuchang due to the civil war. That year Gerlach joined a political study group in Shanghai with progressive foreigners such as Rewi Alley, (Note: Rewi Alley was a New Zealander who had come to Shanghai in April 1927 for a short visit and ended up stayed there until his death in 1987. When he arrived the purge of Communists from the Kuomintang was underway. He saw the revolutionary workers whom the Communists had organized in Shanghai being massacred.) Agnes Smedley and George Hatem (Ma Haide). Other members of the study group, which usually met in Alley's house, included YWCA secretaries Maud Russell, Lily Haass and Deng Yuzhi. (Note: According to Alley the study group was Marxist and the members were himself, Alec Camplin, George Hatem, Ruth Weiss, Trude Rosenberg, Heinz Schippe, Irene Wiedemeyer, Talitha Gerlach, Maud Russell, Lily Haass, Cora Deng and Cao Liang. Russell records a discussion group with much the same membership. Ruth Weiss disputed this in a 1997 interview, saying the only members of the Marxist group were herself, George Hatem, Heinz Schippe and Trude Rosenberg. The others were involved in a separate political discussion group linked to Song Qingling. Alley and other China residents may have claimed the group was Marxist as way of establishing their credentials after the revolution.)

Gerlach came to the conclusion that the sincere, capable and forward-looking Communists were best able to change China from a poor country oppressed by foreigners into a strong, wealthy and independent nation. She also thought that YWCA training would help women become leaders during and after the coming Communist revolution. Alley and Gerlach contacted progressive organizations in China and campaigned to improve social, political and economic conditions. Gerlach was concerned about the practice of binding the feet of women and children in China, which she called inhumane and a perversion of beauty. According to Helen Foster Snow, a journalist in China in the 1930s and wife of Edgar Snow,

[The YWCA] never lost its following in China ... This is because the YWCA grew into a legitimate part of the movement for emancipation of women. It provided a refuge for girls and a place where they could be trained in leadership, self-reliance and self-respect. It was even respected in labor circles, for its Industrial Department tried to provide education and help for factory girls instead of attacking labor. ... The Chinese had a real respect for nearly all the [YWCA] secretaries they worked with, particularly for such persons as Talitha Gerlach, Maud Russell, Lily Haass and a few others.

Gerlach worked at the YWCA headquarters in Shanghai for most of the 1930s. She became involved with the Communist Party and the "national salvation" groups led by students opposed to Chiang Kai-shek's right-wing policies and efforts to appease Japan. War broke out between China and Japan in 1937. The YWCA decided that its secretaries should remain in place, whether they were Chinese or Foreign. Gerlich was flooded by requests that arrived almost every day, such as "Can you find a place for 200 women prisoners who have been evacuated from the jail which is in the fighting zone? Can you take in sixty more children who have just been evacuated from the village of Minghong where the fighting has been very severe? Can we count on the YWCA to share in setting up a temporary hospital for the civilians wounded—the regular hospitals are not able to take them?

In 1938 Gerlach joined the China Defense League organized by Soong Ching-ling, the widow of Sun Yat-sen She helped smuggle money and medical aid to parts of China that had not been occupied and to the Chinese Communists and other group opposed to the Japanese. Gerlach used her position as a non-belligerent foreigner in Japanese-occupied Shangai to smuggle supplies and money to the resistance. She would board an American liner anchored in Shanghai every week to deposit mail for the China Defense League (CDL) in Hong Kong. Gerlach returned to the US in 1940 via Hong Kong, where she met Madam Sun for the first time.

=== United States (1940–51) ===
After the end of World War II (1939–45) Gerlach worked with Ida Pruitt from 1945 to 1951 raising money for the Chinese Industrial Cooperatives while continuing to work for the YWCA in New York City. Gerlach campaigned to obtain money and support in the US for the China Welfare Fund, which disregarded Chiang Kai-shek's protests and sent aid to Communist-held regions of China. She was among the supporters of the Committee for a Democratic Far Eastern Policy, as were Rose Terlin, Lily Haas and others. (Note: The Committee for a Democratic Far Eastern Policy was a left-leaning liberal and progressive organization established in August 1945 that opposed US intervention in China to prop up the Kuomintang government. In the early 1950s it was scrutinized by the House Un-American Activities Committee and the Attorney General's Subversive Activities Control Board.) Gerlach returned to China in July 1946 to resume her YWCA work, and was invited by Madame Sun to join the China Welfare Institute executive, but was recalled to the US in December 1947. In August 1946 Gerlach was invited to help write a constitution for the new League for the Protection of Human Rights in China. Paul Yen, James Gareth Endicott, Y. T. Wu and other liberals were also asked to participate.

With the start of the Cold War the China Aid Council was accused of being a Communist front and was added to the Attorney General's List of Subversive Organizations. The Council was dissolved on 23 November 1948. Some of its members founded the China Welfare Appeal in April 1949, with Gerlach as Chairperson of the Board. Soon after the Attorney General added this organization to his list, and the YWCA decided to dismiss Gerlach. She retired in 1951 as soon as she had completed 25 years of service and was eligible for pension benefits. (Note: Another source says that Gerlach was dismissed from the YWCA in 1951 after 27 years employment due to her political views on China.)

=== Post-war Shanghai welfare work (1945–95) ===
After leaving the YWCA in 1951 Gerlach accepted an invitation from Soong Ching-ling to manage a welfare institute for war refugees. Gerlach joined Yu Jiying, a former YWCA secretary, to undertake social service work at the China Welfare Institute, which Soong Ching-ling had founded during the civil war to help the poorest people in the slums of Shanghai, and after the war to give infant care, health and literacy classes. In 1956, at a time when US politics was very right-wing, Russell wrote to Gerlach expressing envy for her greater freedom in China. The reality was the foreigners such as Gerlach had little freedom of speech, and were subject to tight travel restrictions.

Gerlach had protectors at senior levels in the party, and unlike other foreigners was not arrested during the Cultural Revolution that Mao Zedong launched in 1966. She was considered an "old China hand", as were Ruth Weiss and Hans Müller, all of whom were associated with Soong Ching-ling and had been known and trusted in Shanghai before the revolution. Gerlach supported the Cultural Revolution, and wrote to her old friend Maud Russell describing the events with approval. After 1967 her letters to Russell were very carefully worded, perhaps because she was concerned about either Chinese or Western interpretations. In May 1971 she wrote to Russell asking her not to defend the imprisoned foreigners against charges of spying, but to remove works by Israel Epstein, Elsie Fairfax-Cholmeley and David Crook from lists of past publications in the Far East Reporter.

Alice Cook met Gerlach in 1979, by then a very old woman. Gerlach told Cook she had received no support from the YWCA since the 1930s, and they had held back the money owed to her until she would return to the US. Cook said Gerlach had become almost completely Chinese, and the Chinese were looking after her as a loyal supporter in her old age. Gerlach and 25 other foreigners were honored by Vice Premier Wang Zhen in December 1979 at a banquet in the Beijing Great Hall of the People. Although in her 80s, she was still working half days to help manage the welfare institute, now part of the Culture Ministry. She had a ground-floor flat with a large private garden, an exceptionally good residence for Shanghai at the time. She was always loyal to the Chinese Communist Party, which she never criticized. She died in Shanghai on 12 February 1995 and is buried there in Soong-Ching-ling Park.

== Honors ==
Talitha Gerlach received various honors:

- 1986 Certificate of Honor – Shanghai
- 1987 Honorary permanent resident certificate – Shanghai
- 1988 Camphor Tree Prize for maternal and child welfare – Shanghai
- 1989 Certificate of honor – State Council People's Republic of China
- 1999 Named "people's friendly ambassador"

== Sources ==
- Brady, Anne-Marie (2003), Making the Foreign Serve China: Managing Foreigners in the People's Republic, Rowman & Littlefield, ISBN 978-0-7425-1862-9
- "China honors quiet American woman", The Milwaukee Sentinel, 25 December 1979, archived from the original on 2016-03-12
- Chong, Woei Lien (2002), China's Great Proletarian Cultural Revolution: Master Narratives and Post-Mao Counternarratives, Rowman & Littlefield, ISBN 978-0-7425-1874-2
- Cook, Alice H.; Daniels, Arlene Kaplan (2000), A Lifetime of Labor: The Autobiography of Alice H. Cook, Feminist Press at CUNY, ISBN 978-1-55861-257-0
- Epstein, Israel (2005), My China Eye: Memoirs of a Jew and a Journalist, Long River Press, ISBN 978-1-59265-042-2
- Garner, Karen (Summer 1994), "The "Chinese Connection" to American Radicalism", The Journal of American-East Asian Relations, 3 (2), Brill, JSTOR 23613383
- Garner, Karen (2009-06-01), Precious Fire: Maud Russell and the Chinese Revolution, Univ of Massachusetts Press, ISBN 1-55849-754-4
- Lai, H. Mark (2010), Chinese American Transnational Politics, University of Illinois Press, ISBN 978-0-252-07714-2
- O'Brien, Neil (2004-03-01), American Editor in Early Revolutionary China: John William Powell and the China Weekly/Monthly Review, Routledge, ISBN 978-1-135-94572-5
- Peterson, Rebecca Ewing (20 July 2013), "Talitha A. Gerlach", Find a Grave
- Song, Yuwu (2006-07-18), Encyclopedia of Chinese-American Relations, McFarland, ISBN 978-0-7864-9164-3
- Strohschen, Gabriele (2008-11-07), Handbook of Blended Shore Education: Adult Program Development and Delivery, Springer Science & Business Media, ISBN 978-0-387-09443-4
- "耿丽淑（Talitha Gerlach", people.com.cn (in Chinese), archived from the original on 2016-03-10
- "Tribute to Talitha Gerlach", National Women's History Museum, archived from the original on 2016-03-21
