= Lily Haass =

YWCA worker in Shanghai, China

Lillian Katherine Haass
- Lillian Haass (left) and Mary Dingman (right) with Zuo family children in Changsha, 1923
- Born: 26 November 1886; Merton, Wisconsin, US
- Died: 7 January 1964 (aged 77); Los Angeles, California, US
- Other names: Chinese: 夏秀蘭, Xia Xiulan
- Occupation: YWCA secretary
- Known for: Industrial work in China

Lillian Katherine Haass (Chinese: 夏秀蘭, Xia Xiulan; 26 November 1886 – 7 January 1964) was an American YWCA worker in Shanghai, China, between 1914 and 1945. She led efforts to educate Chinese women to become leaders among industrial workers.

== Life ==
=== Early years ===
Lily K. Haass was born in Merton, Wisconsin. She graduated from the Whitewater State Teachers college and the University of Wisconsin. She moved to China in 1914 and worked as an American YWCA secretary in Beijing. Haass wanted social and economic justice for Chinese factory workers, but as a Christian believed in peaceful, cooperative reform. When Maud Russell came to China they worked together in Beijing in 1919 and became close friends. Haass told Russell about the National Christian Council (NCC), which was helping arrange for Chinese and foreign Christians in Shanghai to work on World Student Christian Federation (WSCF) industrial reform.

In 1920–21 Haass was acting head of the Social Science department of Princeton-in-Peking. Haass worked with Agatha Harrison in the YWCA Industrial Department. In November 1923 Haass invited Russell to travel with her on furlough the next year. They would take the Orient Express across the Soviet Union and then study in a seminar held by Sherwood Eddy at the London School of Economics (LSE). Russell had already made plans to visit India, and had to refuse. The women took different routes, but met in London at the end of March 1924 and went on to Birmingham to attend the international Conference on Christian Politics, Economics and Cirizenship.

=== Head of Industrial Department ===
By the mid-1920s it was becoming clear that to remain a relevant organization in China the YWCA had to pay more attention to the women in rural and industrial occupations and less to the middle classes. In June 1925 Haass, who had graduated from her LSE course, took over as head of the Chinese Industrial Department from Mary Dingman. (Note: Mary Agnes Dingman (1875–1961) would become chairman of the Peace and Disarmament Committee of Women's International Organizations in 1931.) Haass led the combined efforts of the YWCA and the NCC in industrial reform. The YWCA soon gave up trying to cooperate with employers, who refused to make any improvements to working conditions. Haass argued unsuccessfully with Ding Shujing in late 1927 over the direction of the YWCA industrial program. Lily Haass wrote to the World YWCA headquarters to argue her case. She thought the YWCA had to start to work with the "masses" or else go home.

At the time of the Shanghai massacre of 1927 Haas wrote, "Perhaps in Europe and America the YWCA does not question the capitalistic order; here in China we must—God be praised!" In 1927 Haass joined a political study group in Shanghai with progressive foreigners such as Rewi Alley, Maud Russell, Talitha Gerlach and Deng Yuzhi. (Note: According to Alley the study group was Marxist and the members were himself, Alec Camplin, George Hatem, Ruth Weiss, Trude Rosenberg, Heinz Schippe, Irene Wiedemeyer, Talitha Gerlach, Maud Russell, Lily Haass, Cora Deng and Cao Liang. Russell records a discussion group with much the same membership. Ruth Weiss disputed this in a 1997 interview, saying the only members of the Marxist group were herself, George Hatem, Heinz Schippe and Trude Rosenberg. The others were involved in a separate political discussion group linked to Song Qingling. Alley and other China residents may have claimed the group was Marxist as way of establishing their credentials after the revolution.) Haass wrote to Mary Dingman in 1927, "The labor movement is the big factor in the future of our economic society and it makes all the difference in the world what that labor movement thinks. If we wish to help to create that thinking we will need to do it where the workers are." According to Helen Foster Snow, a journalist in China in the 1930s and wife of Edgar Snow,

[The YWCA] never lost its following in China ... This is because the YWCA grew into a legitimate part of the movement for emancipation of women. It provided a refuge for girls and a place where they could be trained in leadership, self-reliance and self-respect. It was even respected in labor circles, for its Industrial Department tried to provide education and help for factory girls instead of attacking labor. ... The Chinese had a real respect for nearly all the [YMCA] secretaries they worked with, particularly for such persons as Talitha Gerlach, Maud Russell, Lily Haass and a few others.

=== Later years ===
In 1930 Haass was replaced as head of the Industrial Department by Deng Yuzhi (Cora Deng), who had completed a year of study at the LSE. In the 1930s Haass hired left-wing Chinese as YWCA staff workers, saying they were the "people of the future". In 1935–36 Haass took over most of the duties of general secretary while Ding Shuching was on furlough. Haass returned to the US in 1936 to study at Columbia University for a year. Before returning to China, in November 1937 she talked at the Berkeley Women's City Club on "Wartime Activities of the Y.W.C.A. in China." Deng Yuzhi became an important leader in women's and religious organizations, and was courted by both the Communists and the Kuomintang. When Soong Mei-ling, wife of Chiang Kai-shek, tried to recruit Deng to work with the Kuomintang, Haass headed off the danger by helping Deng go to the US in 1939 to study at New York University and to publicize the Chinese war effort.

In April 1941 the Milwaukee Journal published excerpts from a letter that Haas, now head of the YWCA in China, had written to her brother, Edwin Haas. She wrote, "We are thinking out here that by spring the United States may be at war with Japan. Shanghai is a terrible place. The Japanese puppets are making money by terrific gambling, kidnaping and general gangsterism. Patriots wear bulletproof vests. Even innocent citizens get shot. What a life!". Lily Haass remained in China until 1945. She returned to the US on 2 August 1945 on the repatriation ship Gripsholm. She became a supporter of the Committee for a Democratic Far Eastern Policy. The American YWCA leaders Talitha Gerlach and Rose Terlin were also supporters.

In November 1964 the Wisconsin alumnus reported the death of Lily Katherine Haass, class of 1912, in Los Angeles, California.

== Sources ==
- Bays, Daniel H. (1999), Christianity in China: From the Eighteenth Century to the Present, Stanford University Press, ISBN 978-0-8047-3651-0
- Brady, Anne-Marie (2003), Making the Foreign Serve China: Managing Foreigners in the People's Republic, Rowman & Littlefield, ISBN 978-0-7425-1862-9
- Chiang, Yung-chen (2001-01-22), Social Engineering and the Social Sciences in China, 1919-1949, Cambridge University Press, ISBN 978-0-521-77014-9
- Dingman, Mary Agnes, 1875-1961. Papers, 1917-1957: A Finding Aid, Radcliffe Institute for Advanced Study, Harvard University
- Epstein, Israel (2005), My China Eye: Memoirs of a Jew and a Journalist, Long River Press, ISBN 978-1-59265-042-2
- Garner, Karen (2009-06-01), Precious Fire: Maud Russell and the Chinese Revolution, Univ of Massachusetts Press, ISBN 978-1-55849-754-2
- Hamrin, Carol Lee; Bieler, Stacey (2009-01-01), Salt and Light, Volume 1: Lives of Faith That Shaped Modern China, Wipf and Stock Publishers, ISBN 978-1-62189-291-5
- Honig, Emily (May 1995), "Review of "Industrial Reformers in Republican China" by Robin Porter", The Journal of Asian Studies, 54 (2), Association for Asian Studies, doi:10.2307/2058783, JSTOR 2058783, S2CID 154441101
- Hove, Arthur (November 1964), "Necrology", Wisconsin Alumnus, 66 (2)
- Lai, H. Mark (2010), Chinese American Transnational Politics, University of Illinois Press, ISBN 978-0-252-07714-2
- "Lily K. Haass To Talk On Fellowship At Tea Tomorrow", Tucson Daily Citizen: 15, 12 November 1945
- "Luncheon To Be Held At City Club", Berkeley Daily Gazette: 6, 10 November 1937
- Sasaki-Gayle, Motoe (2009), Entangled with Empire: American Women and the Creation of the 'New Woman' in China, 1898--1937, Baltimore, Maryland, ISBN 978-0-549-93928-3
- Strohschen, Gabriele (2008-11-07), Handbook of Blended Shore Education: Adult Program Development and Delivery, Springer Science & Business Media, ISBN 978-0-387-09443-4
- "Talk of U.S. in War Is Heard in Shanghai", The Milwaukee Journal, 17 April 1941, archived from the original on 2016-03-13
- "The Wellesley Unit - In China", The Wellesley News, Wellesley College: 4, 1918-05-16
