= Far East Reporter =

- 1970 cover page
- Editor: Maud Russell
- Categories: Politics, economics, social issues
- Frequency: Irregular
- Founded: 1952
- Final issue: 1989
- Country: United States
- Based in: New York City

The Far East Reporter was a magazine or newsletter published in New York City on an irregular schedule from 1953 to 1989 by Maud Russell. It took the form of pamphlets that mainly talked sympathetically about China under Mao Zedong.

== History ==
Maud Russell was the executive director of the Far East Spotlight magazine, which was published from 1946 to 1952 by the Committee for a Democratic Far Eastern Policy (CDFEP). She founded the Far East Reporter in New York City in 1953, and published it until her death in 1989. The newsletter was published on an irregular schedule. Russell had lived in China for 26 years when it was dominated by other countries, and had seen the development of revolutionary nationalism. She used her magazine and speaking tours to explain why the US should recognize the Communist government of China and disengage from Korea, Taiwan and Vietnam. Russell published the views of "experts" on other East and Southeast Asia countries including Vietnam and India, but her main focus was on publishing positive articles about social, political and economic development in China for American readers.

Russell wrote some of the issues herself. Some of the other issues, which were essentially pamphlets on specific topics, were written by well-known people. Russell drew on newspapers and magazines including The New York Times, Far Eastern Economic Review and China Reconstructs, and used material sent by CDFEP supporters in the US and China. Russell had been one of a very small group of "progressive" Westerners in 1930s China, and had returned to the US in 1942. Her regular correspondents from the People's Republic of China included Nan Green, David Crook, Elsie Fairfax-Cholmeley, Israel Epstein, Talitha Gerlach, Rewi Alley and (after 1958) Anna Louise Strong. Often their long letters to Russell were not much more than verbatim copies of Xinhua articles.

In March 1963 the House Un-American Activities Committee (HUC) called on Russell to testify in a closed session. She had been named as a Chinese Communist Party "publicity agent." Russell defended herself vigorously before the committee and in a letter to her subscribers in which she denounced the attempted intimidation by the HUAC. A 1967 description said, "While some readers may be inclined to classify the journal as "Marxist" in content, the publisher, Miss Maud Russell, does not wish to have her views classified as "Marxist". In the 1960s the magazine was praised by the Radical Education Project of the Students for a Democratic Society, which helped publicize her speaking engagements.

During the Cultural Revolution the Epsteins were accused of spying for the West, and from 1968 to 1973 were held in solitary confinement. In May 1971 Russell's old friend Talitha Gerlach wrote from Shanghai to Russell asking her not to defend the imprisoned foreigners against charges of spying, but to remove works by Israel Epstein, his wife Elsie Fairfax-Cholmeley and David Crook from lists of past publications in the Far East Reporter. The last issue of the Far East Reporter appeared in September 1989. In it Russell criticized Deng Xiaoping's Four Modernization policies, which she blamed for the May–June protests.

== Selected issues ==
Issues included: (Note: The years of undated issues are estimated.)

- 1983 June. The Kampuchean Struggle for National Survival. Pertinent Historical and Current Facts about Vietnam’s Presence in Kampuchea by Thiounn Mumm
- 1978 August. Historical Perspective. China and the Olympics by Phillip K. Shinnick
- 1978. February. Answers to Some Question about Cancer, Mental Illness, the Handicapped, Schistosomiasis, Family Planning, Venereal Disease, and the Application of the Mass Line in the People’s Republic of China by Han Suyin, Li Ping, a report by the American Cancer Society, Carl Ratner, Victor & Ruth Sidel, Julian Schuman, and Dan Schwartz.
- 1976 August. The Mass Line in the Chinese Revolution by Dr. Boon-Ngee Cham
- 1976 June. Some Observations on Law in China including. Criminal Justice in China by George W. Crockett, Jr., and People’s Courts in China by Maud Russell
- 1976 April. Back Home in China by Lee Yu-Hwa
- 1976 January. What About Workers in China? by Janet Goldwasser, Stuart Dowty and Maud Russell, including a reissue of "Chinese Factories are Exciting Places" by Goldwasser & Dowty.
- 1975 undated. What About Religion in China? Some Answers for American Christians by Maud Russell
- 1975 March. Marxism and the Cultural Revolution in China. A New Kind of Revolution by Ruth Gamberg
- 1974 September.The Making of the New Human Being in the People’s Republic of China three articles by Dr. K. T. Fann
- 1974 May. Chinese Traditional Medicine conversations and observations by Rewi Alley and an old Chinese doctor
- 1974 February. Building a Socialist Educational System in China includes 3 articles. China’s Cultural Revolution in Education by Rewi Alley; Observations of an American Educational Consultant by Annie Stein; and, The Ongoing Building of China’s Socialist Educational System (Hsinhua)
- 1973 April. The New Human Being in the People’s Republic of China includes 3 small articles. Free to Be Human by Felix Greene; Psychiatric Treatment by Leigh Kagan; and Living Together in a Community by Lucilee Stewart Poo
- 1973 February. Chinese Factories are Exciting Places! by Janet Goldwasser and Stuart Dowty
- 1972 July. The ‘Why?’ of Nixon’s Trip to China by Maud Russell. Includes the joint Chinese/U.S. communiqué of Feb. 27, 1972
- 1972 May. Hand and Brain in China, and other essays a reprint of an Anglo-Chinese Educational Institute pamphlet which includes. Hand and Brain in China by Joseph Needham; China’s Economic Policy by Joan Robinson; The Open Door by Edgar Snow; and China and the Hungry World by Tim Raper.
- 1971 October. The People’s Republic of China Approach to History’s Heritage. Of Territorial and Border Aggressions and to Current Revolutionary Movements by Neville Maxwell
- 1971 August. Ping Pong Serves! First-Hand Returns quotes from reporters and visitors
- 1971 May. An American Soldier Changes Worlds. Life in China of an Ex-Prisoner of War
- 1971 March. The People’s Republic of China. On Becoming 21 — Socialist World Power by Maud Russell.
- 1971 January. China’s Centuries of Contributions to World Science and Technology two articles by Joseph Needham and Maud Russell
- 1970 November.The Liberation Process for Japanese Women a book review by Maud Russell
- 1970 July. Education. A Critique From China — Pedagogical Theory. Bourgeois or Socialist?
- 1970 undated. Chinese Women. Liberated by Maud Russell
- 1970 undated. Revolution Promotes Production by Maud Russell
- 1969 undated. The Sino-Soviet Ussuri River Border Clash by Maud Russell
- 1969 undated United States Neo-Colonialism — Grave Digger in Asia by Maud Russell
- 1969 undated. The Rising National Liberation Struggles of the Peoples in a Key Area of Southeast Asia. Coming Events Cast Their Shadows! by Maud Russell
- 1968 undated. The Ongoing Cultural Revolution in China by Maud Russell
- 1967 undated. China’s Genuine Democracy including. Among the Communes of Mao Tien by Rewi Alley, and Mass Democracy in China by Israel Epstein
- 1967 undated China’s Socialism or India’s Neo-Colonialism. A Development Race and its Outcome by Curtis Ullerich
- 1967 undated The Great Proletarian Revolution and China’s Economic Health by Maud Russell
- 1967 April. The Making of New Man. How the Thinking of Mao Tse-tung Helps a Man Look at Himself and Change Himself by Tuan Ping-li
- 1967 March. Some Background on China’s Great Proletarian Cultural Revolution by Maud Russell.
- 1967 January. Chinese Traditional Medicine. An Observation on Acupuncture — A Practitioner’s View by Felix Mann
- 1966 undated. Traditional Medicine in Communist China. Science, Communism and Cultural Nationalism by Ralph C. Croizier
- 1966 undated. The Influence of the Thought of Mao Tse-tung by Rewi Alley
- 1966 October. Mass-Line Leaders and Leadership in Rural China Chapter XVIII of The First Years of Yangyi Commune by Isabel and David Crook
- 1966 March. The Process of Urban and Rural Economy in China includes. The Role of the People’s Communes by Shirley Wood; and Self-Reliance by David Crook
- 1966 February. Seeing Is Believing by an American POW in China
- 1965 October. The Past in China’s Present. A Cultural, Social, and Philosophical Background for Contemporary China by Joseph Needham
- 1965 September. In Southeast Asia Today. The United States, Vietnam, China Four Poems by Rewi Alley
- 1965 June. Some Observations on Education, Trade and the Political Process in China by Dr. C. H. Geoffrey Oldham, J. Russell Love and Anna Louise Strong
- 1965 April. Some Background on United States in Southeast Asia — MAPHILINDO an article by Jose Ma. Sison about the Maphilindo concept
- 1965 March. Letters from Friends in China
- 1964 June. Asians Speak Out on United States ‘Aid’ Policy and Programs includes US Aid to Pakistan. An Evaluation by Hamza Alavi, and Why Cambodia Rejected Aid by Han Suyin
- 1964 April. China Speaks for Herself. In Interviews Granted by Prime Minister Chou En-Lai to British, American, Pakistani and Japanese Newsmen
- 1963 undated. Some Facts About Today’s Tibet excerpts from The Truth About Tibet by Stuart and Roma Gelder
- 1963 China 1963 — Food — Medicine — People’s Communes as seen by Rewi Alley, Dr. Wilder Penfield, David Crook and Anna Louise Strong
- 1963 undated. The China-India Conflict
- 1961 June. China’s Path to Her New Society unsigned article
- 1961 March How the Chinese are Conquering the Food Problem. Letters from China
- 1960 undated. Why Do Chinese ‘Refugees’ ‘Escape’ to Hongkong? including Is This a Valid Question? by Maud Russell, and The Letter Life Would Not Print by Anna Louise Strong
- 1959 undated. We Build the Ming Tombs Dam by Israel Epstein
- 1959. The Real Tibet by Susan Warren
- 1953. What Path for India? by Gerhard Hagelberg

== Sources ==
- Brady, Anne-Marie (2003), Making the Foreign Serve China: Managing Foreigners in the People's Republic, Rowman & Littlefield, ISBN 978-0-7425-1862-9
- "Far East Reporter", Banned Thought
- Garner, Karen (June 1, 2009), Precious Fire: Maud Russell and the Chinese Revolution, Univ of Massachusetts Press, ISBN 978-1-55849-754-2
- Shaffer, Harry G. (1967), The Communist World: Marxist and Non-Marxist Views, Ardent Media, GGKEY:A6JTECUTWJH
- Song, Yuwu (July 18, 2006), "Committee for a Democratic Far Eastern Policy", Encyclopedia of Chinese-American Relations, McFarland, ISBN 978-0-7864-4593-6
- Wu, Xiaoxin (July 17, 2015), "Maud Russell Papers, 1914-90", Christianity in China: A Scholars' Guide to Resources in the Libraries and Archives of the United States, Routledge, ISBN 978-1-317-47468-5
