= Qi =

Vital force in traditional Chinese philosophy

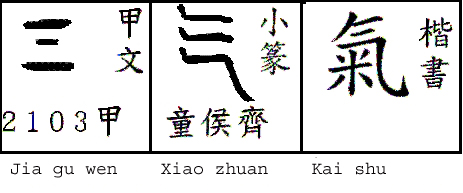

Chinese name
- Traditional Chinese: 氣
- Simplified Chinese: 气
Transcriptions
Standard Mandarin
- Hanyu Pinyin: qì
- Bopomofo: ㄑㄧˋ
- Gwoyeu Romatzyh: chih
- Wade–Giles: ch'i^{4}
- Tongyong Pinyin: cì
- IPA: [tɕʰî]
Wu
- Romanization: ^{5}chi
Hakka
- Pha̍k-fa-sṳ: hi
Yue: Cantonese
- Yale Romanization: hei
- Jyutping: hei3
- IPA: [hej˧]
Southern Min
- Hokkien POJ: khì
Eastern Min
- Fuzhou BUC: ké
Middle Chinese
- Middle Chinese: khj+jH
Old Chinese
- Baxter–Sagart (2014): *C.qʰəp-s

Burmese name
- Burmese: အသက်
- IPA: /ă.t̪ɛʔ/

Vietnamese name
- Vietnamese alphabet: khí
- Hán-Nôm: 氣

Thai name
- Thai: ชี่
- RTGS: chi

Korean name
- Hangul: 기
- Hanja: 氣
Transcriptions
- Revised Romanization: gi
- McCune–Reischauer: ki

Mongolian name
- Mongolian Cyrillic: хий
- Mongolian script: ᠬᠡᠢ
Transcriptions
- SASM/GNC: khii

Japanese name
- Kanji: 気
Transcriptions
- Romanization: ki

Malay name
- Malay: chi (چي)

Indonesian name
- Indonesian: chi

Filipino name
- Tagalog: gi

Portuguese name
- Portuguese: qi

Lao name
- Lao: ຊີວິດ

Khmer name
- Khmer: ឈី

Tetun name
- Tetun: qi

In the Sinosphere and Chinese philosophy, qi (/ˈtʃiː/ CHEE; simplified Chinese: 气; traditional Chinese: 氣; pinyin: qì) (Note: Also ch'i (Wade–Giles), or chi) is a vital force traditionally believed to be a part of all living entities. Literally meaning 'vapor', 'air', 'gas', or 'breath', the word qi is polysemous, often translated as 'vital energy', 'vital force', 'material energy', or simply 'energy'. Qi is also a concept in traditional Chinese medicine and in Chinese martial arts. The attempt to cultivate and balance qi is called qigong.

Believers in qi describe it as a vital force, with one's good health requiring its flow to be unimpeded. Originally prescientific, today it is a pseudoscientific concept, i.e. not corresponding to the concept of energy as used in the physical sciences.

Chinese gods and immortals, especially anthropomorphic gods, are sometimes thought to have qi and be a reflection of the microcosm of qi in humans, both having qi that can concentrate in certain body parts.

== Linguistic aspects ==
The cultural keyword qì is analyzable in terms of Chinese and Sino-Xenic pronunciations. It is represented by the logographs 氣, 气, and 気 with various meanings ranging from "vapor" to "anger", and is the source of the English loanword qi or ch'i.

=== Pronunciation and etymology ===
The logograph 氣 is read with two Chinese pronunciations: the usual qì 氣 "air; vital energy" and the rare archaic xì 氣 "to present food" (later disambiguated with 餼). Hackett Publishing Company, Philip J. Ivanhoe, and Bryan W. Van Norden theorize that the word qi possibly came from a term that referred to "the mist that arose from heated sacrificial offerings".

Pronunciations of 氣 in modern varieties of Chinese with standardized IPA equivalents include: Standard Chinese qì /t͡ɕʰi˥˩/, Wu Chinese qi /t͡ɕʰi˧˦/, Southern Min khì /kʰi˨˩/, Eastern Min ké /kʰɛi˨˩˧/, Standard Cantonese hei^{3} /hei̯˧/, and Hakka Chinese hi /hi˥/.

Pronunciations of 氣 in Sino-Xenic borrowings include: Japanese ki, Korean gi, and Vietnamese khí.

Reconstructions of the Middle Chinese pronunciation of 氣 standardized to IPA transcription include: /kʰe̯i^{H}/ (Bernard Karlgren), /kʰĭəi^{H}/ (Wang Li), /kʰiəi^{H}/ (Li Rong), /kʰɨj^{H}/ (Edwin Pulleyblank), and /kʰɨi^{H}/ (Zhengzhang Shangfang).

Axel Schuessler's reconstruction of the Later Han Chinese pronunciation of 氣 is /kɨs/.

Reconstructions of the Old Chinese pronunciation of 氣 standardized to IPA transcription include: */kʰɯds/ (Zhengzhang Shangfang), */C.qʰəp-s/ (William H. Baxter and Laurent Sagart), and */kə(t)s/ (Axel Schuessler).

The etymology of qì interconnects with Kharia kʰis "anger", Sora kissa "move with great effort", Khmer kʰɛs "strive after; endeavor", and Gyalrongic kʰɐs "anger".

=== Characters ===
In the East Asian languages, qì has three logographs:

- 氣 is the traditional Chinese character, Korean hanja, and Japanese kyūjitai ("old character form") kanji
- 気 is the Japanese shinjitai ("new character form") kanji
- 气 is the simplified Chinese character.

In addition, qì 炁 is an uncommon character especially used in writing Daoist talismans. Historically, the word qì was generally written as 气 until the Han dynasty (206 BCE–220 CE), when it was replaced by the 氣 graph clarified with mǐ 米 "rice" indicating "steam (rising from rice as it cooks.)" and depicting the Traditional Chinese view of the transformative, changeable nature of existence and the universe.

This primary logograph 气, the earliest written character for qì, consisted of three wavy horizontal lines seen in Shang dynasty (c. 1600–1046 BCE) oracle bone script, Zhou dynasty (1046–256 BCE) bronzeware script and large seal script, and Qin dynasty (221–206 BCE) small seal script. These oracle, bronze, and seal scripts logographs 气 were used in ancient times as a phonetic loan character to write qǐ 乞 "plead for; beg; ask" which did not have an early character.

The vast majority of Chinese characters are classified as radical-phonetic characters. Such characters combine a semantically suggestive "radical characters" with a phonetic element approximating ancient pronunciation. For example, the widely known word dào 道 "the Dao; the way" graphically combines the "walk" radical 辶 with a shǒu 首 "head" phonetic. Although the modern dào and shǒu pronunciations are dissimilar, the Old Chinese *lˤuʔ-s 道 and *l̥uʔ-s 首 were alike. The regular script character qì 氣 is unusual because qì 气 is both the "air radical" and the phonetic, with mǐ 米 "rice" semantically indicating "steam; vapor".

This qì 气 "air/gas radical" was only used in a few native Chinese characters like yīnyūn 氤氲 "thick mist/smoke", but was also used to create new scientific characters for gaseous chemical elements. Some examples are based on pronunciations in European languages: fú 氟 (with a fú 弗 phonetic) "fluorine" and nǎi 氖 (with a nǎi 乃 phonetic) "neon". Others are based on semantics: qīng 氫 (with a jīng 巠 phonetic, abbreviating qīng 輕 "light-weight") "hydrogen (the lightest element)" and lǜ 氯 (with a lù 彔 phonetic, abbreviating lǜ 綠 "green") "(greenish-yellow) chlorine".

Qì 氣 is the phonetic element in a few characters such as kài 愾 "hate" with the "heart-mind radical" 忄or 心, xì 熂 "set fire to weeds" with the "fire radical" 火, and xì 餼 "to present food" with the "food radical" 食.

The first Chinese dictionary of characters, the Shuowen Jiezi(121 CE) notes that the primary qì 气 is a pictographic character depicting 雲气 "cloudy vapors", and that the full 氣 combines 米 "rice" with the phonetic qi 气, meaning 饋客芻米 "present provisions to guests" (later disambiguated as xì 餼).

Oracle bone script for qì depicting the classical three treasures of Chinese philosophy

Bronzeware script for qì

Large seal script for qì

Small seal script for qì, simplified Chinese character 气 is based on it.

Traditional Chinese character 氣 qì, also used in Korean hanja. In Japanese kanji, it was used until 1946 when it was simplified to 気.

=== Meanings ===
Qi is a polysemous word. The unabridged Chinese-Chinese character dictionary Hanyu Da Cidian defines it as "present food or provisions" for the xì pronunciation but also lists 23 meanings for the qì pronunciation. The modern ABC Chinese-English Comprehensive Dictionary, which enters xì 餼 "grain; animal feed; make a present of food", and a qì 氣 entry with seven translation equivalents for the noun, two for bound morphemes, and three equivalents for the verb.

n. ① air; gas ② smell ③ spirit; vigor; morale ④ vital/material energy (in Ch[inese] metaphysics) ⑤ tone; atmosphere; attitude ⑥ anger ⑦ breath; respiration b.f. ① weather 天氣 tiānqì ② [linguistics] aspiration 送氣 sòngqì v. ① anger ② get angry ③ bully; insult.

Qi was also thought of as meaning "'forces in nature'" that deity could control and magicians and occultists could harness.

=== English borrowing ===
Qi was an early Chinese loanword in English. It was romanized as k'i in Church Romanization in the early-19th century, as ch'i in Wade–Giles in the mid-19th century (sometimes misspelled chi omitting the apostrophe), and as qi in Pinyin in the mid-20th century. The Oxford English Dictionary entry for qi gives the pronunciation as /tʃi/, the etymology from Chinese qì "air; breath", and a definition of "The physical life-force postulated by certain Chinese philosophers; the material principle." It also gives eight usage examples, with the first recorded example of k'í in 1850 (The Chinese Repository), (Note: Quoting Confucius that the Taiji or "Great Extreme is the primordial substance (k'í) which, moving along, divided and made two k'í; that which in itself has motion is the Yang, and that which had rest .‥ is the Yin.") of ch'i in 1917 (The Encyclopaedia Sinica), (Note: The essence of the ethical principle Li "is absolutely pure and good, but seeing that it is inseparable from the material element Ch'i.‥ it is from Man's birth to a greater or less extent impeded and tainted.") and qi in 1971 (Felix Mann's Acupuncture) (Note: "To the ancients the cornerstone of the theory of acupuncture, the concept whereby they explained its effects and action, was Qi, the energy of life.")

The word qi is very frequently used in word games—such as Scrabble—due to containing a letter Q without a letter U.

== Concept ==
References to concepts analogous to qi are found in many Asian belief systems. An early form of qi comes from the writings of the Chinese philosopher Mencius (4th century BCE).

Within the framework of Chinese thought, no notion may attain such a degree of abstraction from empirical data as to correspond perfectly to one of our modern universal concepts. Nevertheless, the term qi comes as close as possible to constituting a generic designation equivalent to our word "energy". When Chinese thinkers are unwilling or unable to fix the quality of an energetic phenomenon, the character qi (氣) inevitably flows from their brushes.

— Manfred Porkert

The ancient Chinese described qi as "life force". They believed it permeated everything and linked their surroundings together. Qi was also linked to the flow of energy around and through the body, forming a cohesive functioning unit. By understanding the rhythm and flow of qi, they believed they could guide exercises and treatments to provide stability and longevity.

Although the concept has been important within many Chinese philosophies, over the centuries the descriptions of qi have varied and have sometimes been in conflict. Until China came into contact with Western scientific and philosophical ideas, the Chinese had not categorized all things in terms of matter and energy. Qi and li (理: "pattern") were 'fundamental' categories similar to matter and energy.

"In later Chinese philosophy, qi was thought of as the fundamental 'stuff' out of which everything in the universe condenses and into which it eventually dissipates."

Fairly early on, some Chinese thinkers began to believe that there were different fractions of qi—the coarsest and heaviest fractions formed solids, lighter fractions formed liquids, and the most ethereal fractions were the "lifebreath" that animated living beings. Yuanqi is a notion of innate or prenatal qi which is distinguished from acquired qi that a person may develop over their lifetime.

== Philosophical roots ==
The earliest texts that speak of qi give some indications of how the concept developed. In the Analects of Confucius, qi could mean "breath". Combining it with the Chinese word for blood (making 血氣, xue–qi, blood and breath), the concept could be used to account for motivational characteristics:

The [morally] noble man guards himself against three things. When he is young, his xue–qi has not yet stabilized, so he guards himself against sexual passion. When he reaches his prime, his xue–qi is not easily subdued, so he guards himself against combativeness. When he reaches old age, his xue–qi is already depleted, so he guards himself against acquisitiveness.

— Confucius, Analects, 16:7

The philosopher Mozi used the word qi to refer to noxious vapors that would eventually arise from a corpse were it not buried at a sufficient depth. He reported that early civilized humans learned how to live in houses to protect their qi from the moisture that troubled them when they lived in caves. He also associated maintaining one's qi with providing oneself with adequate nutrition. In regard to another kind of qi, he recorded how some people performed a kind of prognostication by observing qi (clouds) in the sky.

Mencius described a kind of qi that might be characterized as an individual's vital energies. This qi was necessary to activity and it could be controlled by a well-integrated willpower. When properly nurtured, this qi was said to be capable of extending beyond the human body to reach throughout the universe. It could also be augmented by means of careful exercise of one's moral capacities. On the other hand, the qi of an individual could be degraded by adverse external forces that succeed in operating on that individual.

Living things were not the only things believed to have qi. Zhuangzi indicated that wind is the qi of the Earth. Moreover, cosmic yin and yang "are the greatest of qi". He described qi as "issuing forth" and creating profound effects. He also said "Human beings are born [because of] the accumulation of qi. When it accumulates there is life. When it dissipates there is death... There is one qi that connects and pervades everything in the world."

The Guanzi essay Neiye ("Inward Training") is the oldest received writing on the subject of the cultivation of qi and meditation techniques. The essay was probably composed at the Jixia Academy in Qi in the late fourth century B.C.E.

Xun Zi, another Confucian scholar of the Jixia Academy, followed in later years. At 9:69/127, Xun Zi says, "Fire and water have qi but do not have life. Grasses and trees have life but do not have perceptivity. Fowl and beasts have perceptivity but do not have yi (sense of right and wrong, duty, justice). Men have qi, life, perceptivity, and yi." Chinese people at such an early time had no concept of radiant energy, but they were aware that one can be heated by a campfire from a distance away from the fire. They accounted for this phenomenon by claiming "qi" radiated from fire. At 18:62/122, he also uses "qi" to refer to the vital forces of the body that decline with advanced age.

Among the animals, the gibbon and the crane were considered experts at inhaling the qi. The Confucian scholar Dong Zhongshu (ca. 150 BC) wrote in Luxuriant Dew of the Spring and Autumn Annals: "The gibbon resembles a macaque, but he is larger, and his color is black. His forearms being long, he lives eight hundred years, because he is expert in controlling his breathing." ("猿似猴。大而黑。長前臂。所以壽八百。好引氣也。")

Later, the syncretic text assembled under the direction of Liu An, the Huai Nan Zi, or "Masters of Huainan", has a passage that presages most of what is given greater detail by the Neo-Confucians:

Heaven (seen here as the ultimate source of all being) falls (duo 墮, i.e., descends into proto-immanence) as the formless. Fleeting, fluttering, penetrating, amorphous it is, and so it is called the Supreme Luminary. The dao begins in the Void Brightening. The Void Brightening produces the universe (yu–zhou). The universe produces qi. Qi has bounds. The clear, yang [qi] was ethereal and so formed heaven. The heavy, turbid [qi] was congealed and impeded and so formed earth. The conjunction of the clear, yang [qi] was fluid and easy. The conjunction of the heavy, turbid [qi] was strained and difficult. So heaven was formed first and earth was made fast later. The pervading essence (xi–jing) of heaven and earth becomes yin and yang. The concentrated (zhuan) essences of yin and yang become the four seasons. The dispersed (san) essences of the four seasons become the myriad creatures. The hot qi of yang in accumulating produces fire. The essence (jing) of the fire-qi becomes the sun. The cold qi of yin in accumulating produces water. The essence of the water-qi becomes the moon. The essences produced by coitus (yin) of the sun and moon become the stars and celestial markpoints (chen, planets).

— Huai-nan-zi, 3:1a/19

Qi is linked to East Asian thought on magic, and certain body parts were important to magic traditions such as some Daoist sects.

== Role in traditional Chinese medicine ==
The Huangdi Neijing ("The Yellow Emperor's Classic of Medicine", circa 2nd century BCE) is historically credited with first establishing the pathways, called meridians, through which qi allegedly circulates in the human body.

In traditional Chinese medicine, symptoms of various illnesses are believed to be either the product of disrupted, blocked, and unbalanced qi movement through meridians or deficiencies and imbalances of qi in the Zang Fu organs. Traditional Chinese medicine often seeks to relieve these imbalances by adjusting the circulation of qi using a variety of techniques including herbology, food therapy, physical training regimens (qigong, tai chi, and other martial arts training), moxibustion, tui na, or acupuncture.The cultivation of Heavenly and Earthly qi allow for the maintenance of psychological actions

The nomenclature of qi in the human body is different depending on its source, role, and location. Qi is differentiated between so-called "primordial qi" (acquired at birth from one's parents) and qi acquired throughout one's life. Similarly, Chinese medicine differentiates between qi acquired from the air ("clean air") and qi acquired from food and drinks ("grain qi").

There is also a difference between "defensive qi" and "nutritive qi" in traditional Chinese medicine. Defensive qi's role is to defend the body against invasions while nutritive qi's role is to provide sustenance for the body. To protect against invasions, medicines have four types of qi: cold, hot, warm, and cool. Cold qi medicines are used to treat invasions hot in nature, while hot qi medicines are used to treat invasions cold in nature.

Qi may also be named after the zangfu organ or the meridian in which it resides, such as the "liver qi" or the "spleen qi". Prolonged exposure to the three evil qi (wind, cold, and wetness) can result in the penetration of evil qi through surface body parts, eventually reaching zangfu organs, such as the heart, the liver, or the intestines.

A qi field (chu-chong) refers to the cultivation of an energy field by a group, typically for healing or other benevolent purposes. A qi field is believed to be produced by visualization and affirmation. They are an important component of Wisdom Healing Qigong (Zhineng qigong), founded by Grandmaster Ming Pang.

== Scientific view ==
The existence of qi has not been proven scientifically. A 1998 consensus statement on acupuncture by the United States National Institutes of Health noted that concepts such as qi "are difficult to reconcile with contemporary biomedical information".

== Practices involving qi ==
=== Feng shui ===
The traditional Chinese art of geomancy, the placement and arrangement of space called feng shui, is based on calculating the balance of qi, interactions between the five elements, yin and yang, and other factors. The retention or dissipation of qi is believed to affect the health, wealth, energy level, luck, and many other aspects of the occupants. Attributes of each item in a space affect the flow of qi by slowing it down, redirecting it or accelerating it. This is said to influence the energy level of the occupants. Positive qi flows in curved lines, whereas negative qi travels in straight lines. In order for qi to be nourishing and positive, it must continue to flow not too quickly or too slowly. In addition, qi should not be blocked abruptly, because it would become stagnant and turn destructive.

One use for a luopan is to detect the flow of qi. The quality of qi may rise and fall over time. Feng shui with a compass might be considered a form of divination that assesses the quality of the local environment.

There are three kinds of qi, known as heaven qi (tian qi 天气), Earth qi (di qi 地气), and human qi (ren qi 人气). Heaven qi is composed of natural forces including the sun and rain. Earth qi is affected by heaven qi. For example, too much sun would lead to drought, and a lack of sun would cause plants to die off. Human qi is affected by earth qi, because the environment has effects on human beings. Feng shui is the balancing of heaven, Earth, and human qi.

=== Reiki ===
Reiki is a form of alternative medicine called energy healing. Reiki practitioners use a technique called palm healing or hands-on healing through which a "universal energy" is said to be transferred through the palms of the practitioner to the patient in order to encourage emotional or physical healing. Reiki is a pseudoscience, and is used as an illustrative example of pseudoscience in scholarly texts and academic journal articles. It is based on qi ("chi"), which practitioners say is a universal life force, although there is no empirical evidence that such a life force exists. Clinical research has not shown reiki to be effective as a treatment for any medical condition. There has been no proof of the effectiveness of reiki therapy compared to the placebo effect. An overview of reiki investigations found that studies reporting positive effects had methodological flaws. The American Cancer Society stated that reiki should not replace conventional cancer treatment, a sentiment echoed by Cancer Research UK and the National Center for Complementary and Integrative Health. Developed in Japan in 1922 by Mikao Usui, it has been adapted into varying cultural traditions across the world.

According to its believers, Reiki healing occurs by laying hands over or on an individual's area of pain and controlling the universal Qi flow of the nearby space, sending into the area of malaise and purifying it. There is no regulation of the practicing of Reiki in the United States and generally no central world organization that has authority over it.

=== Qigong ===
Qìgōng (气功 or 氣功) involves coordinated breathing, movement, and awareness. It is traditionally viewed as a practice to cultivate and balance qi. With roots in traditional Chinese medicine, philosophy and martial arts, qigong is now practiced worldwide for exercise, healing, meditation, and training for martial arts. Typically a qigong practice involves rhythmic breathing, slow and stylized movement, practicing mindfulness, and visualization of guiding qi.

=== Martial arts ===
Qi is a didactic concept in Chinese, Vietnamese, Korean, and Japanese martial arts. Martial qigong is a feature of both internal and external training systems in China and other East Asian cultures. The most notable of the qi-focused "internal" force (jin) martial arts are Baguazhang, Xingyiquan, tai chi, Southern Praying Mantis, Snake Kung Fu, Southern Dragon Kung Fu, Aikido, Kendo, Hapkido, Aikijujutsu, Luohanquan, and Liuhebafa.

Demonstrations of qi or ki are popular in some martial arts and may include the unraisable body, the unbendable arm, and other feats of power. These feats can be explained using biomechanics and physics.

=== Acupuncture and moxibustion ===
Acupuncture is a part of traditional Chinese medicine that involves insertion of needles or the application of pinching/gripping into/onto superficial structures of the body (skin, subcutaneous tissue, muscles) at acupuncture points to balance the flow of qi. This is often accompanied by moxibustion, a treatment that involves burning mugwort on or near the skin at an acupuncture point.

== See also ==
- Aether (classical element)
- Aṣẹ (Yoruba)
- Aura (paranormal)
- Chakra (Indian religions)
- Dantian (traditional Chinese medicine: a center of qi)
- Energy (esotericism)
- Esoteric healing
- Geist (German word)
- Livity (Rastafari concept)
- Mana (Oceanic cultures)
- Orenda (theorized spiritual power)
- Orgone (modern esoteric philosophy)
- Pneuma (ancient Greek word)
- Prana (Indian cultures)
- Reiki (modern Japanese practice)
- Scientific skepticism
- Soul
- Spirit (animating force)
