= Rewi Alley =

New Zealand writer and political activist

Rewi Alley QSO MM
- Born: 2 December 1897; Springfield, New Zealand
- Died: 27 December 1987 (aged 90); Beijing, China

Rewi Alley QSO MM (known in China as 路易•艾黎, Lùyì Aìlí, 2 December 1897 – 27 December 1987) was a New Zealand-born writer and political activist. A member of the Chinese Communist Party, he dedicated 60 years of his life to the cause and was a key figure in the establishment of Chinese Industrial Cooperatives and technical training schools, including the Bailie Schools and Peili Vocational Institute (now Beijing Bailie University), both named after his mentor Joseph Bailie. Alley was a prolific writer about 20th century China, and especially the communist revolution. He also translated numerous Chinese poems.

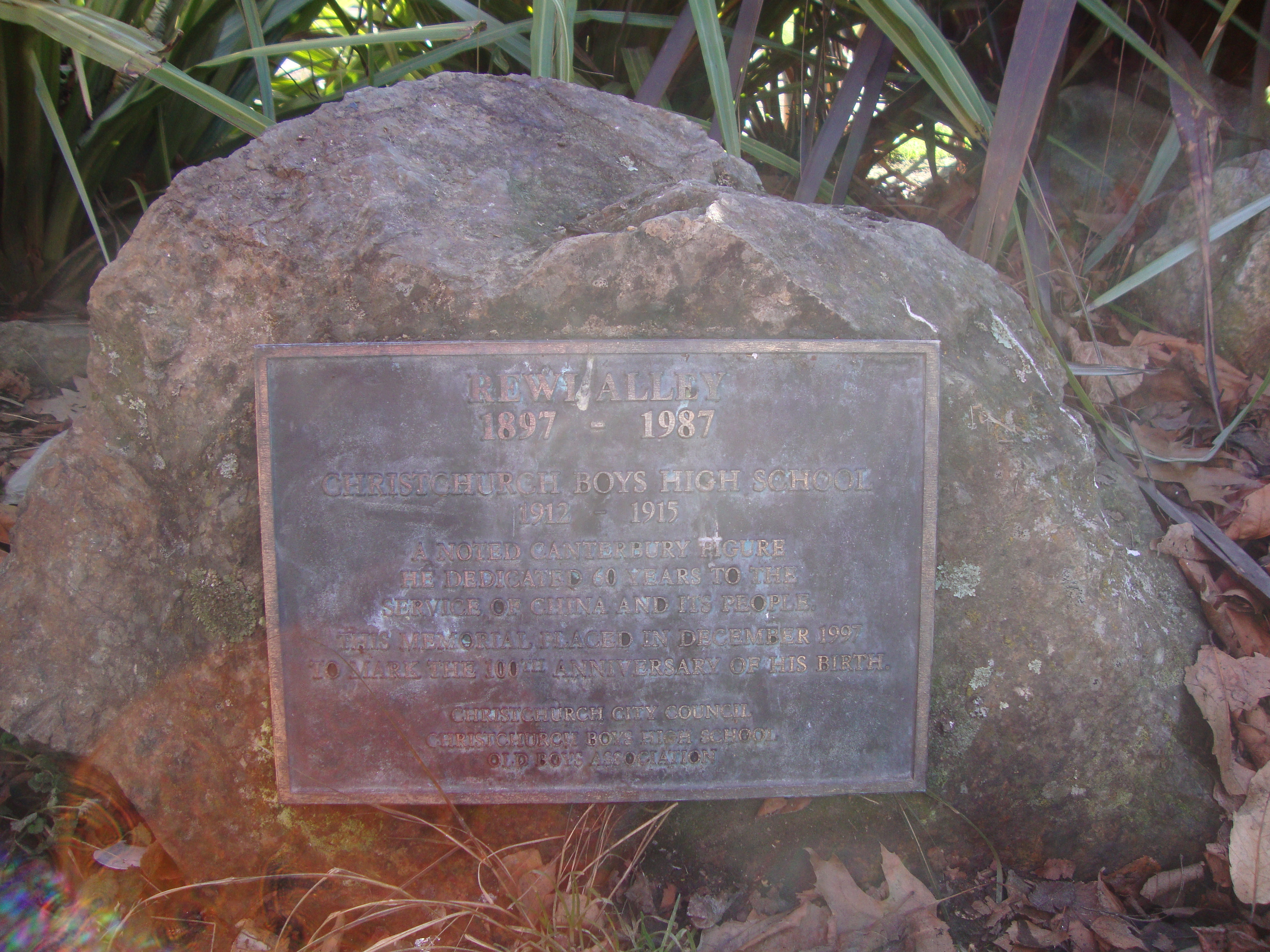
Memorial plaque at Christchurch Boys' High School, Alley's 100th birthday.

== Early life and influences ==
Alley was born in the small town of Springfield, in inland Canterbury, New Zealand. He was named after Rewi Maniapoto, a Māori chief who famously resisted the British military during the New Zealand Wars in the 1860s. Alley's father, Frederick James Alley, was a teacher, and Rewi attended primary school at Amberley; then Wharenui School in Christchurch, where his father was appointed headmaster in 1905; and finally Christchurch Boys' High School. His mother, Clara Maria (née Buckingham), was a leader of the New Zealand women's suffrage movement. Alley wrote in his autobiography that his father was "a great believer in social progress, a socialist before his time" who adopted the Unitarian position in religion and did not allow his children to go to Sunday school because he did not want them to have beliefs forced upon them.

His parents' keen interest in social reform and education influenced all of their children:

- brother Geoff (1903–1986) became an All Black and worked as a travelling WEA (Workers' Educational Association) tutor sponsored by the Carnegie Foundation, before becoming New Zealand's first National Librarian in 1964;
- sister Gwendolen (Gwen Somerset) (1894–1988) was a pioneer in primary school education practices, and president of the New Zealand Federation of Nursery Play Centres' Associations (Playcentre);
- younger sister Joyce (1908–2000) became a prominent nursing administrator; and
- brother Philip (1901–1978) was a lecturer at the engineering school of the University of Canterbury. He is credited with the idea of moving the university campus from central Christchurch to the suburb of Ilam.

Rewi's elder brother, Eric, fought in WW1 in the Otago Regiment, NZEF, and rose to the rank of captain. He was fatally wounded in action and died on 17 June 1916, at the age of 23.

In 1916, Alley joined the New Zealand Army and was sent to serve in France, where he won the Military Medal. There, he met workers in the Chinese Labour Corps who had been sent to work for the Allied armies. During the war, he was injured and caught in no man's land. Lyall McCallum and another man rescued him and took him back to safety. After the war, Alley tried farming in New Zealand.

In 1927, he decided to go to China. He moved to Shanghai with thoughts of joining the Shanghai Municipal Police, but instead, he became a fire officer and municipal factory inspector. The duties exposed him to the poverty in the Chinese community and the racism in the Western communities. He joined a political study group whose members included Alec Camplin, George Hatem, Ruth Weiss, Trude Rosenberg, Heinz Schippe, Irene Wiedemeyer, Talitha Gerlach, Maud Russell, Lily Haass, Cora Deng and Cao Liang.

His politics turned from fairly-conventional right-wing pro-empire sentiments to thoughts of social reform. In particular, a famine in 1929 made him aware of the plight of China's villages. Using his holidays and taking time off work, Alley toured rural China helping with relief efforts. He adopted a 14-year-old Chinese boy, Duan Si Mou, whom he named Alan, in 1929.

After a brief visit to New Zealand, where Alan experienced public racism, Alley became Chief Factory Inspector for the Shanghai Municipal Council in 1932. By then, he was a secret member of the Chinese Communist Party and was involved in anti-criminal activities on behalf of the party. He adopted another Chinese son, Li Xue, whom he called Mike, in 1932. After the outbreak of war with Japan in 1937, Alley set up the Chinese Industrial Cooperatives. He also set up schools, which he called Bailie Schools after his American friend Joseph Bailie. Edgar Snow wrote of Alley's work in the CIC: "Where Lawrence brought to the Arabs the distinctive technique of guerilla war, Alley was to bring China the constructive technique of guerilla industry...."

By 1941, Alley was one of the contacts of the Chinese Communist Party in the English-speaking world. Due to his purported knowledge of the Chinese way of war, Colonel Gordon Grimsdale of the Far East Combined Bureau interviewed him after being asked by Major-General Christopher Maltby (who recently assumed the post as General Officer Commanding Hong Kong) about recruiting more Hong Kong soldiers for local defence in face of the coming war. Alley, however, oversold his case. He "expressed the gravest doubts as to the efficacy of attempting to raise an infantry unit for purely local defence" because he did not "think suitable material [was] available either as leaders or for the rank and file", and questioned if the garrison had the time to train and equip such a unit. On the other hand, Alley was "extremely optimistic on the subject of starting a guerrilla unit for the indirect defence of the Colony", and proposed to send "a [suitably] equipped party to Canton to burn Japanese aeroplanes on the Canton aerodrome, or to destroy some important bridge(s)". Training would be carried out in Hong Kong, in the name of forming a labour battalion, and the soldiers should consist of those who were interned in Hong Kong. He stressed the importance of introducing "pro-Chinese" education for the soldiers and he proposed that "the best man he can suggest as the chief organizer is Yeh Chieh Ying (Ye Jianying)", a Cantonese Communist general.

In 1945, he became headmaster of the Shandan Bailie School after the death of George Hogg.

== After communist victory ==
Following the Communist victory over the Nationalists in 1949, Alley was urged to remain in China and to work for the Chinese Communist Party. He produced many works praising the party and the government of the People's Republic of China, including Yo Banfa!, Man Against Flood and China's Hinterland in the Great Leap Forward. Some of his published works have historic interest. Although imprisoned and "struggled with" during the Cultural Revolution, Alley remained committed to communism and bore no grudges.

In 1963, Edgar Snow after the publication of his book The Other Side of The River: Red China Today, was described as an associate of Alley in a Sydney book review.

In 1973, New Zealand civil servant Gerald Hensley and the new New Zealand Ambassador to China, Bryce Harland, called on Alley. "He was in his seventies, a bald, pink-faced man with bright blue eyes, and an inexhaustible flow of conversation. We sat and talked for most of an afternoon, with Rewi occasionally jumping up to fetch a book or check a point. He had, he said, lost the best of two libraries, once to the Japanese and again to the Red Guards, who had thrown out his collections and torn up his pictures in front of him. He was still bitter over their behaviour." He was living in the old Italian Legation, which had been converted into flats for the leading foreign friends of China, which were allocated on the "bleak basis" of seniority. On the death of the previous occupant Anna Louise Strong, Rewi moved downstairs into the best front apartment and everyone else moved on one place.

Unlike most of the friends of the Chinese Communist Party who remained in Beijing, Alley had little trouble travelling around the world, usually lecturing on the need for nuclear disarmament. The New Zealand government did not strip Alley of his passport and remained proud of his ties to important party leaders. In the 1950s, he is reported to have been offered a knighthood but turned the honour down. He supported the Communist North Vietnam during the Vietnam War. He was appointed a Companion of the Queen's Service Order for community service in the 1985 New Year Honours. At the ceremony, New Zealand's Prime Minister, David Lange, made a moving and dramatic speech, turned to Alley at its conclusion and said with sincerity, "New Zealand has had many great sons, but you, Sir, are our greatest son."

== Death and legacy ==
He died in Beijing on 27 December 1987. New Zealand Prime Minister David Lange eulogised him on his 90th birthday, just weeks before his death.

His house in Beijing is now the offices of the Chinese People's Association for Friendship with Foreign Countries.

In 1996, Jack Body wrote an opera in three acts, "Alley", based on his life, with libretto by Geoff Chapple. It was performed at the International Festival of the Arts in Wellington in 1998.

=== Memorial at Springfield ===
An extensive memorial to Rewi Alley has been erected at Springfield, Canterbury, New Zealand. It contains a large stone carving and a number of panels giving details of his life.

=== Rewi Alley Memorial Hall and Research Centre at Lanzhou City University College ===
Opened in 2017 on the occasion of the 120th anniversary of Alley's birth is a three-story Rewi Alley Memorial Building. The memorial hall operates as a free public museum and is within the grounds of the Lanzhou City University Bailie Campus (the site of the former Bailie Oil School, the successor to Rewi Alley and George Hogg's Bailie Vocational School in nearby Shandan). The Memorial Hall contains an extensive and permanent display of Rewi Alley history and chronicles his contributions as an educator and internationalist in China. The hall is open at normal opening hours and can be found adjacent to the Rewi Alley bust at the Bailie Campus of the university.

=== Rewi Alley Memorial House in Shandan ===
A replica of the home that Alley lived in when he was the headmaster of the original Shandan Bailie School has samples of Rewi's belongings and furniture, including a kang bed, tables, typewriter, books, and pictures of 1940s school life.

== Views of China and New Zealand ==
Some of Alley's private conversations revealed his views on his birth and adopted countries:

"Never mind about whether you are a student of China or not, as long as you are among the ordinary people you will get an understanding, a real understanding of this country. You're already in amongst it... Some very bad things happened. The price of China breaking free of foreign domination and the bad things of its past was enormous. They reckon that it cost 30 million lives to build new China. The West should have a bit more gratitude for the struggle of the Chinese. If it wasn't for the resistance in China during the Second World War, the Japanese would have had tens of thousands more men and they may have got as far as Australia and New Zealand. Back then sides were clear-cut. They were clearer even before the war, if you had the wit to see it. I became involved in China's struggle and I chose my side. After the war and the revolution, I knew I had a choice. I could have joined the critics of China, but China had become like my family and as in all families, even though you might have been arguing with each other, when the guests come you present a loyal unified face to the world. I could have joined the journalists and so-called sinologists in condemning everything about the revolution, but I had already chosen my side."

"This place (China) is a great case study of humanity; one of the biggest examples of humanity's struggle. If you can't feel for these people, you can't feel anything for the world. Although it was in France, in the First World War, that I first had a taste of China. I can remember when there were a lot of shells falling and we had our rifles and our steel helmets on and there were these coolies. Coolies, that's a word people don't use much any more; but that's what they were, these Chinese labourers. Coolie comes from the word bitterness. These blokes were eating their fair share of bitterness in France. Navvies for the poms, they were. Shells bursting and the ground shaking like there was an earthquake, and they were stripped to their skinny waists and just kept unloading the wagons. I saw endurance and a determination that I had seldom seen before. Then later, back there in the thirties, I was involved in the factories in Shanghai and I can remember seeing sacks in the alleys at the back of the factories. At first I thought they were sacks of rubbish, but they weren't, they were dead children. Children worked to death in the foreign-owned factories. Little bundles of humanity worked to death for someone's bloody profit. So I decided that I would work to help China. I suppose then it was like a marriage of sorts and I wrote what I wrote and said what I said out of loyalty to that marriage. I know China's faults and contradictions; there are plenty of those. But I wanted to work for this place and I still do. I woke up to some important things here and so I felt I owed China something for that."

"I had human principles and I made choices based on these. I have always been and will always be a New Zealander; although New Zealand has not always seen me as that. But I know my own motives. The buggers even refused to renew my passport at one point and they treated my adopted son very badly. Did you know that when Robert Muldoon visited Mao Zedong in the 1970s he was the last head of state to see him? Well I'm told that when Muldoon asked what he could do for Mao, Mao is supposed to have said 'Give Alley his passport back.' "

"I love New Zealand, and sometimes miss it. New Zealand is a good country, populated by basically just and practical people. But there is a fascist streak in New Zealand as well, and we must always be vigilant to prevent it from having too much sway. I remember as a boy, I was walking along the beach near Christchurch and there was a group of men coming back from a strike, or a picket of some kind. Suddenly, out of the dunes came police on horseback and they rode into these unarmed workingmen, swinging their clubs as if they were culling seals. I will stand up against such forces as long as I can stand. Even here, in the Cultural Revolution, when some young blokes came in here and started breaking things I grabbed one of them and put him over my knee and gave him a proper hiding. I got army guards on the gate after that. That was thanks to Zhou Enlai, looking after an old mate from Shanghai; but I stood up to them. I know many in New Zealand see me as a traitor to their culture, but I have never betrayed New Zealand. What I betrayed was the idea many New Zealanders had of what a Kiwi should be and what was right and wrong in the political world. There is a very big difference."

"Successive New Zealand governments have tried hard to discredit me as if I was some sort of communist threat to them or a traitor. Well I am a communist, but I am not a traitor. I have always loved New Zealand. I just said what I thought was important and true."

== Private life ==
Anne-Marie Brady in Friend of China wrote that Rewi Alley was homosexual. Jack Body (who in 1998, with Geoff Chapple, wrote an opera based on Alley's life) has stated that this assertion was likely to be true and his sexual orientation was important in understanding Alley's personality and the choices he made. Roderic Alley wrote in Dictionary of New Zealand Biography "Alley was almost certainly homosexual, and never married."

He met the British biochemist and historian Joseph Needham in the summer of 1943 and they became lifelong friends.

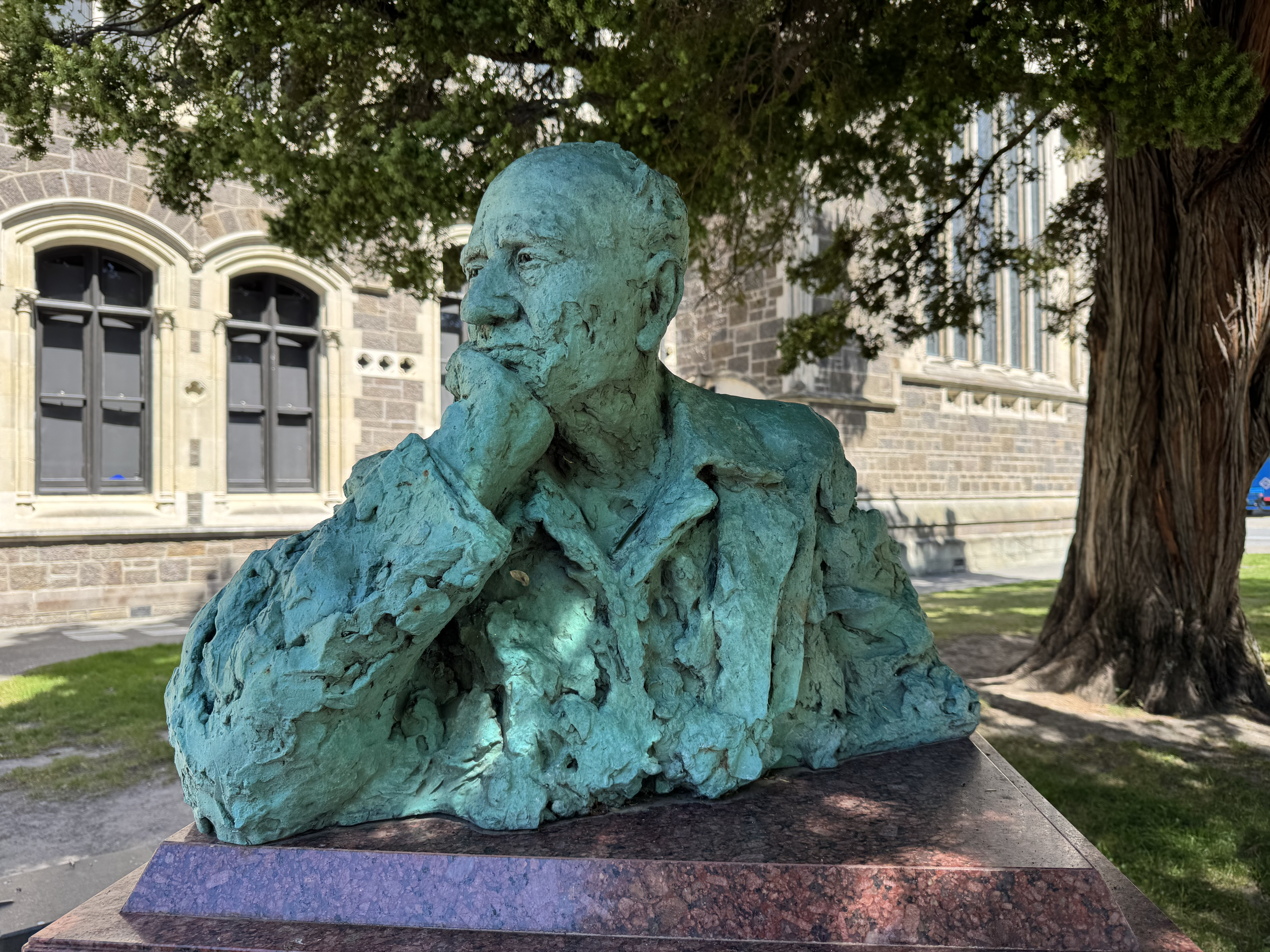
Sculpture of Rewi Alley by Yuan Xikun unveiled at the Christchurch Art Centre in June 2024.

== Works ==
Alley translated numerous Chinese poems and wrote a number of original works. Alley described his writing as follows: "It became my way of contributing. There was so much going on in China. I felt I had to help people understand. I am not a writer. I am certainly not much of a poet. But it was my work. You know, sometimes it would take me hours to get one page finished."

=== Poetry ===
- Peace Through the Ages, Translations from the Poets of China, 1954
- The People Speak Out: Translations of Poems And Songs of the People of China, 1954
- Fragments of Living Peking and Other Poems, 1955
- The Mistake, 1956
- Beyond the Withered Oak Ten Thousand Saplings Grow, 1957
- Human China, 1957
- Journey to Outer Mongolia: A Diary with Poems, 1957
- The People Sing, 1958
- Poems of Revolt, 1962
- Tu Fu: Selected Poems, 1962
- Not a Dog, 1962
- The Eighteen Laments, 1963
- Poems of Protest, 1968
- Poems for Aotearoa, 1972 (collection)
- Over China's Hills of Blue: Unpublished Poems and New Poems, 1974
- Today and Tomorrow, 1975
- Snow over the Pines, 1977
- The Freshening Breeze, 1977
- Li Pai: 200 Selected Poems, 1980
- Folk Poems from China's Minorities, 1982
- Pai Chu-i:Selected Poems, 1983
- Light and Shadow along a Great Road – An Anthology of Modern Chinese Poetry, 1984; ISBN 0-8351-1516-X
- In Southeast Asia Today, the United States, Vietnam, China
- Upsurge, Asia and the Pacific
- What Is Sin?
- Who Is the Enemy
- Winds of Change

=== Other works ===
- A Highway, and an Old Chinese Doctor: A Story of Travel through Unoccupied China during the War of Resistance, and Some Notes on Chinese Medicine
- Gung Ho, 1948
- Leaves from a Sandan Notebook, 1950
- Yo Banfa! (We Have a Way!), 1952
- The People Have Strength, 1954/1957
- Buffalo Boys of Viet-Nam, 1956
- Land of the Morning Calm: A Diary of Summer Days in Korea, 1956
- Man Against Flood – A Story of the 1954 Flood on the Yangtse and of the Reconstruction That Followed It, 1956
- Spring in Vietnam. A Diary of a Journey, 1956
- Children of the Dawn, Stories of Asian Peasant Children, 1957
- Peking Opera: An Introduction Through Pictures by Eva Siao and Text by Rewi Alley, 1957
- Stories out of China, 1958
- Sandan: An Adventure in Creative Education, 1959; Reprint ISBN 99912-0-016-9
- China's Hinterland – in the Great Leap Forward, 1961
- Land and Folk in Kiangsi – a Chinese Province in 1961, 1962
- Amongst Hills and Streams of Hunan, 1963
- Our Seven – Their Five – A Fragment from the Story of Gung Ho, 1963
- For the Children of the Whole World, 1966
- Chinese Children, 1972
- Taiwan: A Background Study, 1972/1976
- Prisoners: Shanghai 1936, 1973
- The Rebels, 1973
- Travels in China: 1966–71, 1973
- Refugees from Viet Nam in China, 1980
- Six Americans in China, 1985
- At 90: Memoirs of my China Years, 1986
- Rewi Alley, An Autobiography, 1987; ISBN 9780477013505
- Fruition: The Story of George Alwin Hogg
- The Influence of the Thought of Mao Tse-tung
- The Mistake
- Towards a People's Japan: Account of a Journey to Tokyo and speech given by Rewi Alley
- Oceania: An outline for Study, 1969 (1st edition); 1971 (2nd edition)

== See also ==
- Ida Pruitt
- Anna Louise Strong
- Gung-ho

== Sources ==
- Airey, Willis: A Learner in China, A Life of Rewi Alley (Christchurch, Caxton Press & Monthly Review Society, 1970).
- Beattie, James; Bullen, Richard, eds. (2018). New China Eyewitness: Roger Duff, Rewi Alley and the Art of Museum Diplomacy Hardcover. Translated by Xiongbo Shi. Canterbury University Press. ISBN 978-1927145944. Account of 1956 visit to the PRC by Alley, James Bertram, and Canterbury Museum officials.
- Brady, Anne-Marie: Friend of China, The Myth of Rewi Alley (RoutledgeCurzon 2002), ISBN 0-7007-1493-6.
- —— (1995). "West Meets East: Rewi Alley and Changing Attitudes Towards Homosexuality in China" (PDF). East Asian History. 9.
- Chapple, Geoff: Rewi Alley of China, Auckland: Hodder & Stoughton. ISBN 0-340-25687-7.
- Sandys, Elspeth (2019). A Communist in the Family: Searching for Rewi Alley. Dunedin: Otago University Press. ISBN 978-1-98-853160-1. "A Communist in the Family (book)". University of Otago. Otago University Press. July 2019.
