= Ding Shujing =

- 丁淑静
- Ding Shujing, General Secretary, at YWCA national headquarters in Shanghai
- Born: February 1890; Linqing, Shandong Province, China
- Died: 27 July 1936 (aged 46); Shanghai, China
- Occupation: Teacher
- Known for: Head of Chinese YWCA

Ding Shujing (Chinese: 丁淑静, February 1890 – 27 July 1936) was the first Chinese leader of the Chinese YWCA, holding office from 1925 to 1936.

== Early years ==
Ding Shujing was born in Linqing, Shandong Province, in February 1890. Her family converted from Buddhism to Christianity when Ding was ten or twelve. She attended mission schools in Dezhou and Tongzhou. She enrolled in North China Union College in Beijing in 1907 and graduated in 1911. For a short period she was a teacher.

In 1914 Ding joined the Beijing YWCA. She felt that Christianity gave people wholeness of life and thus let them develop their potential as humans and search for higher spiritual ideals. She thought the church should recognize the equal participation of women and men in the Body of Christ. She wrote, "If the position of men and women is not equal in the church, the original mission of the church will not be fulfilled, and the development of church ministry will also be hampered."

In late 1922 Ding was appointed executive secretary for the Chinese YWCA's first national convention committee. A few months later she accepted a position as associate general secretary. When Rosalee Venable went on furlough Ding was appointed acting national general secretary. She was given a scholarship to the YWCA National Training School in New York.

== YWCA general secretary ==
In February 1925 Venable announced that she intended to resign, and through her influence the national committee agreed to appoint Ding as her successor as of 1 January 1926. Under pressure, Ding accepted this position, and returned to Shanghai late in 1925 after a year in the US. She was the first Chinese woman to head the YWCA.

In late 1927 the forceful secretary Lily Haass argued unsuccessfully with Ding over the direction of the YWCA industrial program. Lily Haass wrote to the World YWCA headquarters to argue her case. She thought the YWCA had to start to work with the "masses" or else go home. Ding gave considerable freedom to the YWCA secretaries, who vigorously developed the industrial and rural programs. Ding also served in executive roles with Jinling College in Nanjing, Yenching University in Beijing, Bridgeman Academy in Beijing, McTyeire School for Girls in Shanghai, the National Council of Women of China and the National Christian Council of China.

Ding took a furlough in 1935 and traveled in Europe, the United States and Japan, where she promoted peace and friendly relations between the Chinese and Japanese YWCAs. Haass took over most of the duties of general secretary while Ding was on furlough. Ding returned, exhausted, early in 1936, after saying she planned to resign, but agreed to stay on while another Chinese secretary was made ready for the job. Ding was invited to serve as a permanent representative of Asia on the YWCA World Council. Before she could take this position she was hospitalized with sepsis caused by a serious tooth infection, and died after a short interval in Shanghai on 27 July 1936. She was aged 46. She was replaced by Cai Kui, who was preferred by the board over Cora Deng since she was not so openly "progressive". The YWCA of China held a memorial service in Shanghai, and established the Ting Shu-Ching memorial fund, to support leadership training institutes, in her memory.

== Sources ==
- Bays, Daniel H. (1999), Christianity in China: From the Eighteenth Century to the Present, Stanford University Press, ISBN 978-0-8047-3651-0
- Garner, Karen (2009-06-01), Precious Fire: Maud Russell and the Chinese Revolution, Univ of Massachusetts Press, ISBN 978-1-55849-754-2
- Hamrin, Carol Lee; Bieler, Stacey (2009-01-01), Salt and Light, Volume 1: Lives of Faith That Shaped Modern China, Wipf and Stock Publishers, ISBN 978-1-62189-291-5
- Hamrin, Carol Lee (2005), "Ding Shujing", Biographical Dictionary of Chinese Christianity
- Sasaki-Gayle, Motoe (2009), Entangled with Empire: American Women and the Creation of the 'New Woman' in China, 1898--1937, Baltimore, Maryland, ISBN 978-0-549-93928-3
