= Haass =

Haass or Haaß is a German surname. Notable people with the surname include:

- Christian Haass (born 1960), German biochemist
- Friedrich Joseph Haass (1780–1853), Russian physician
- Lillian K. Haass, YWCA worker in Shanghai, China, between 1914 and 1945.
- Michael Haaß (born 1983), German handball player
- Richard N. Haass (born 1951), American diplomat
