= Joseph Bailie =

Irish-American missionary and educator in China (1860–1935)

- Traditional Chinese: 裴義理
- Simplified Chinese: 裴义理
Transcriptions
Standard Mandarin
- Hanyu Pinyin: Péi Yìlǐ
- Wade–Giles: P'ei2 I4-li3

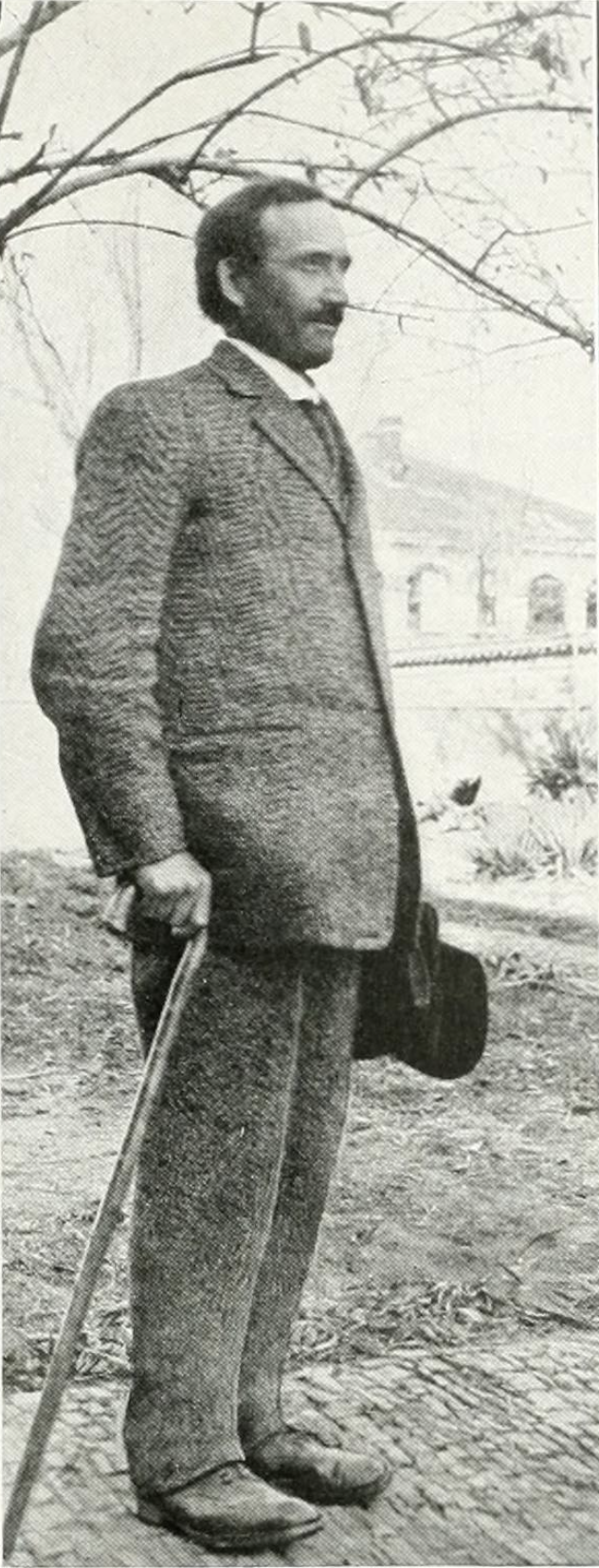
Joseph Bailie as a professor in Nanjing

Joseph Bailie (1860–1935) was an Irish-American missionary and economist active in China during the late Qing dynasty and the Republic of China.

Bailie was born in Ballycloughan, Ireland in 1860. He was a naturalized American citizen. From 1891 to 1898, Bailie served as a missionary of the Board of Foreign Missions of the Presbyterian Church in Suzhou. From 1899 to 1901, he was a professor at the Imperial University in Beijing. In 1914, he founded the College of Agriculture and Forestry of Nanjing University. From 1919 to 1930 he worked on founding the Bureau of Industrial Service in Nanjing; in 1931 he established a similar Bureau in Shenyang. In 1928, he met Rewi Alley, who named the Bailie Schools (now Beijing Bailie University) after him. During his time in China, he founded settlements in Lai'an, Anhui (1913) and Jilin (1917); worked on flood management from 1917 to 1918 and 1931–32, the latter period in Hankou; and advised the court in Hexian, Anhui from 1934 to 1935. In 1935, he committed suicide in Berkeley, California.
