= Committee for a Democratic Far Eastern Policy =

- Abbreviation: CDFEP
- Formation: August 1945
- Dissolved: August 1952
- Legal status: Defunct
- Purpose: Promote US support of Communist China
- Official language: English
- Executive director: Maud Russell
- Main organ: Far East Spotlight

The Committee for a Democratic Far Eastern Policy (CDFEP) was an organization that was active in 1945–52 in opposing US support for the Kuomintang government in China.

== History ==
The CDFEP was founded in August 1945, towards the end of World War II (1939–45). It was Left-leaning, liberal and progressive. The committee was opposed to the policy of Harry S. Truman's administration to support Chiang Kai-shek and his Kuomintang government in China. Founders included Frederick Vanderbilt Field and Philip J. Jaffe, who both had connections with the Communist Party USA (CPUSA). The retired brigadier general Evans Carlson publicly supported the committee, and progressive China hands such as Edgar Snow were active in it. Agnes Smedley was not at first invited to join, perhaps because of her disagreements with the CPUSA. The Christian leader and YWCA executive Rose Terlin became a supporter of the committee, as did the American YWCA Secretaries Talitha Gerlach and Lily Haass, who had both worked in China. From 1946 the organization was headed by Maud Russell as executive director.

The committee was mainly based in California and the west coast of the US. The CDFEP offices were in the same New York building as the Institute of Pacific Relations (IPR) and the left-wing journal Amerasia. The organization was loosely structured, and at its peak of activity in 1946 had only six paid employees. The committee members spoke and wrote on Chinese current affairs, and published the newsletter Far East Spotlight. The CDFEP rarely paid its speakers or the political writers who contributed to its publications. In the winter of 1947–48 Agnes Smedley addressed the CDFEP, which now honored her as "the Matriarch of Far Eastern Writers". After the Communists took power in China in 1949, the committee favored diplomatic recognition of the People's Republic of China. The committee members were opposed to the US policy in the Korean War. After Anna Louise Strong fell out with the Soviet Communist Party in 1949 over her support of Mao Zedong's nationalist movement, the CDEFP led the fight against her rehabilitation, perhaps due to CPUSA pressure.

== Dissolution and legacy ==
In the early 1950s the House Un-American Activities Committee and the Attorney General's Subversive Activities Control Board monitored the CDFEP closely. Funding dried up, members resigned, and in August 1952 the committee was dissolved. In November 1952 Russell wrote to the last CDFEP members,

The Committee for a Democratic Far Eastern Policy is no longer in existence, after completing seven full years of activity geared toward informing and mobilizing American public opinion on the issues of our country's relationships with the Far East. Its work has served to pave the way for the current emphasis on Far Eastern policy, which many organizations now make a major part of their action programs. Making available specialized Far Eastern material remains, however, as important as ever—if not more so. ... I propose to continue writing and to make available as widely as possible facts and analyses by other writers on developments in the Far East which touch upon the interests of the American people.

Russell launched a newsletter Far East Reporter as a successor to Far East Spotlight. In the early 1970s, with relations between the US and China improving, some of former members of the CDFEP came into demand as speakers on China-related topics. Some of former members, including Russell, founded the US–China Peoples Friendship Association.

== Sources ==
- Epstein, Israel (2005), My China Eye: Memoirs of a Jew and a Journalist, Long River Press, ISBN 978-1-59265-042-2
- Garner, Karen (2009-06-01), Precious Fire: Maud Russell and the Chinese Revolution, Univ of Massachusetts Press, ISBN 978-1-55849-754-2
- Mao, Zedong; Kau, Michael Y. M.; Leung, John K. (1992), The Writings of Mao Zedong, 1949-1976: September 1945 - December 1955, M.E. Sharpe, ISBN 978-0-87332-391-8
- Oneill, William L. (1990), A Better World: Stalinism and the American Intellectuals, Transaction Publishers, ISBN 978-1-4128-1602-1
- Price, Ruth (2004-12-08), The Lives of Agnes Smedley, Oxford University Press, USA, ISBN 978-0-19-534386-1
- Song, Yuwu (2006-07-18), Encyclopedia of Chinese-American Relations, McFarland, ISBN 978-0-7864-9164-3
