= Rose Terlin =

American economist

Rose R. Terlin
- Born: 24 October 1908; San Francisco, California, US
- Died: 17 June 1979 (aged 70); Washington, D.C., US
- Occupation: Economist
- Known for: YWCA leader

Rose R. Terlin (24 October 1908 – 17 June 1979) was an American Christian leader, economist, author of several books on religion and economic justice and a YWCA leader. During and after World War II (1939–45) she held various senior government positions.

== Life ==
Rose R. Terlin was born in San Francisco in 1908. She studied at the University of California at Berkeley, where she gained a master's degree in economics. The Fellowship of Socialist Christians was organized in the early 1930s by Reinhold Niebuhr and others with similar views. Later it changed its name to Frontier Fellowship and then to Christian Action. Rose Terlin was one of the main supporters of the Fellowship in the early days, as were Eduard Heimann, Sherwood Eddy and Paul Tillich. In its early days the group thought capitalist individualism was incompatible with Christian ethics. Although not Communist, the group acknowledged Karl Marx's social philosophy.

Terlin wrote about the connection between religion and economic justice. In her 1936 You and I and the Movies she noted that in typical labor films like Black Fury or Riff-Raff it is taken for granted that there is "no cause for the strike save personal animosities or someone's personal ambition." Hollywood would very rarely blame a business for giving cause to strike. In her Christian Faith and Social Action (1940) she wrote,

The Christian faith is a realistic combination of the personal and social. It deals with persons – and their achieving of life and wholeness – but also with the religious importance of their relations with other people ... We who call ourselves Christians, who claim to be committed to the will of God, have a greater responsibility than anyone else to stand for justice, equality and the right of all human beings to share in the fruits of the earth ... [Christianity] lays upon us the inescapable responsibility to judge fearlessly the moral issues involved in the present world crisis and to act realistically for the achievement of a new world order. Such a task is not all sweetness and light. It demands all we have and then more. But to them that are willing to do his will, God gives strength and power and life.

As Economic Secretary for the YWCA National Association, and later as Editor of the YWCA Woman's Press, Terlin was often attacked for her views. On 9 October 1939 a witness told the Dies Committee that Terlin was a member of the Young Communist League and that she had attended the national training school run by the Communist Party. Terlin denied this in a sworn affidavit, but the charge was often brought up as evidence that the YWCA had been infiltrated by Communists.

In her affidavit Terlin stated that she had only just returned to the US on 1 October 1939 after spending two years in Geneva, Switzerland, working for the World Student Christian Federation (WSCF), and was now Economics Secretary of the National Board of the YWCA USA. Terlin was a member of the national board of the YWCA USA from 1939 to 1943, and was also director of social and economic studies of the WSCF in Geneva. In August 1942 she was among the signatories of Christians for Victory: A statement by American Christian Leaders to their Fellow-Christians on the Moral and Spiritual Issues at Stake in the Outcome of the War. It opened with the assertion, "This war must be won by the United Nations." She joined the National War Labor Board, where she was appointed head of the white collar section in the New York area.

Terlin became a supporter of the Committee for a Democratic Far Eastern Policy. The American YWCA Secretaries Talitha Gerlach and Lily Haass, who had both worked in China, were also supporters. After leaving the War Labor Board Terlin was editor-in-chief of the YWCA USA's Women's Press and of the Whiteside Press in New York. She was director of public relations for the YWCA in Pittsburgh from 1955 to 1960. She moved to Washington, D.C. in 1960 and joined the Department of Labor's Women's Bureau, where she became a senior economist. In 1965 as chief of the Employment Opportunities Branch of the US Department of Labor she talked about the revolution that was occurring in the pattern of women's lives, with longer lives and the need for two paychecks to pay for "the greater variety of goods and services considered essential to meet the American standard of living." She said girls, "must be helped early in their teens to prepare them for the dual role of homemakers and workers."

Terlin retired in 1975. She died of cancer on 17 June 1979, aged 71, at the Washington Home Hospice.

== Publications ==
- Rose Terlin (1936), You and I and the Movies, The Woman's Press
- Rose Terlin (1938), Social study and action in the Student Christian Movements
- Rose Terlin (1940), Christian Faith and Social Action
- Rose Terlin (1941), Faith for reconstruction, New York: Council for Social Action of the Congregational Christian Churches, p. 42
- Terlin, Rose (1941), Bulletin on Rural Problems of the U.S.A., p. 56
- Rose Terlin (1942), No man unto himself;: Services of worship on interdependence
- Brooks Spivey Creedy; Rose R. Terlin (1942), Consumer Problems and Projects, Womans Press, p. 72
- Caroline C. Cherrix, Helen O. Nicol, Janice N. Hedges, Jean Alice Wells, Mary Brilla Meyer, Regina M. Neitzey, Rose Terlin, United States. Women's Bureau, Mary C. Manning (1963), 1962 Handbook on Women Workers, U.S. Department of Labor, Women's Bureau, p. 321
- Rose Terlin (1964), Job horizons for college women in the 1960s, United States. Women's Bureau, p. 78
- Rose Terlin (1970), Jobfinding techniques for mature women., United States. Women's Bureau, p. 40
- Rose Terlin (1975), A Working Woman* s Guide to Her Job Rights, Washington: U.S. Department of Labor, Employment Standards Administration, Women's Bureau, p. 34

== Sources ==
- Atkinson, Henry A.; et al. (23 August 1942), The Living Church, Morehouse-Gorham Company
- Bluestone, George (1968), Novels Into Film, University of California Press, GGKEY:61QFFK41WFQ
- "Early Start Called For in Career Preparation", The American Journal of Nursing, 65 (2), Lippincott Williams & Wilkins, February 1965, JSTOR 3453050
- Epstein, Israel (2005), My China Eye: Memoirs of a Jew and a Journalist, Long River Press, ISBN 978-1-59265-042-2
- "Rose Terlin Dies, Economist Was Publicist With the YWCA", The Washington Post, 19 June 1979
- Sophia Smith Collection, Christian Faith and Social Action, Smith College, Northampton
- Stone, Ronald H. (1992-01-01), Professor Reinhold Niebuhr: A Mentor to the Twentieth Century, Westminster John Knox Press, ISBN 978-0-664-25390-5
