= Gwen Somerset =

New Zealand teacher

Gwen Somerset MBE
- Born: Gwendolen Lucy Alley; 16 November 1894; Springfield, New Zealand
- Died: 31 October 1988 (aged 93); Wellington, New Zealand
- Known for: Contribution to development of adult education and pre-school education in New Zealand
- Spouse: Crawford Somerset (m. 1930; died 1968)
- Relatives: Geoff Alley (brother); Rewi Alley (brother)

Gwendolen Lucy Somerset MBE (née Alley, 16 November 1894 – 31 October 1988) was a New Zealand teacher, adult education director, educationalist and writer.

== Early life ==
Somerset was born in Springfield, New Zealand in 1895. She was the second of seven children of Frederick Alley and Clara (born Buckingham). Her brother Rewi Alley later became famous for his development work in China. Another brother, Geoff Alley, played rugby union for New Zealand as an All Black, and was later National Librarian.

The family moved to Amberley when Somerset was three, and her father became headmaster of the local high school there. When Somerset was 14, the family moved again, to Christchurch and she began to attend Christchurch Girls' High School. Two years later she became a pupil-teacher at a Christchurch primary school, and simultaneously took classes at Canterbury University College.

== Career and professional life ==
In 1921, Somerset attended a Workers' Educational Association (WEA) summer school in Oxford, New Zealand and met James Shelley, a professor of education at Canterbury University College. She was inspired by his ideas and said that this course changed her life. She went on to apply for a teaching position in Oxford. Her teaching methods were unconventional - she started the day with singing and dancing for example, as she found that many of her pupils worked hard on their family farms and needed relaxation at school. She also removed the teacher's table and chair in her classroom as symbols of authority and sat on children's chairs herself. As there was little reading material for the younger children, Somerset started to write her own booklets. School inspectors and the headmaster supported her and her new ideas, and in 1923 she was promoted to Infant Mistress.

Gwen married Crawford Somerset in Christchurch in 1930, and in 1936, the couple jointly received a Carnegie Fellowship and attended the First World Conference in Early Childhood Education in England.

After one more year in Oxford, the Somersets moved to Feilding at the invitation of L.J. Wild, principal of Feilding Agricultural High School, and became co-directors of the Feilding Community Centre for Further Education. They ran classes for adults, showed films from the National Film Library, and established the Feilding Community Players amateur drama group. Somerset also branched out into pre-school education by setting up a play group for children under the age of five years.

In 1947 the Somersets moved to Wellington as Crawford had been appointed to the Department of Education at Victoria University of Wellington. Gwen decided to specialise in early childhood education and in 1949 was elected the first president of the New Zealand Federation of Nursery Play Centres (now Playcentre). She wrote I Play and I Grow, which is still used as a reference and guide for Playcentres today, and a number of booklets as well as editing the Playcentre Journal. Gwen also became active in the WEA and in the Free Kindergarten movement, and lectured on child development at the Wellington Free Kindergarten Training College. She was also active on the National Council of Women of New Zealand, the YWCA and CORSO.

In the 1965 Queen's Birthday Honours, Somerset was appointed a Member of the Order of the British Empire, for services to pre-school and adult education, and in 1975 she was awarded an honorary Doctor of Laws degree by Victoria University of Wellington, becoming the first woman to receive an honorary degree from that institution.

In 1988, she published her autobiography, Sunshine and Shadow.
