= Geoff Alley =

New Zealand rugby player (1903–1986)

Geoff Alley OBE
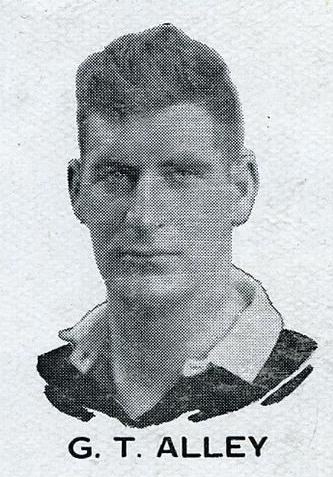
- Born: Geoffrey Thomas Alley; 4 February 1903 Amberley, New Zealand
- Died: 25 September 1986 (aged 83) Upper Hutt, New Zealand
- Height: 1.90 m (6 ft 3 in)
- Weight: 100 kg (220 lb)
- School: Christchurch Boys' High School
- University: Canterbury University College
- Notable relative(s): Rewi Alley (brother); Gwen Somerset (sister)
- Occupation: Librarian

Rugby union career
- Position: Lock
Provincial / State sides
| Years | Team | Apps | (Points) |
| 1925–26 | Southland | | |
| 1927–30 | Canterbury | | |
International career
| Years | Team | Apps | (Points) |
| 1926–28 | New Zealand | 3 | (0) |
| 1927 | NZ Universities | | |

Geoffrey Thomas Alley OBE (4 February 1903 – 25 September 1986) was a New Zealand rugby union player and librarian. He played three test matches for the All Blacks and was New Zealand's first national librarian.

== Early life and family ==
Born in Amberley, North Canterbury, in 1903, Alley was the fifth child of Clara Maria Alley (née Buckingham) and her husband Frederick James Alley. His siblings included Rewi Alley, the activist and educator who went to China, and Gwen Somerset, a noted educator. He was educated at Christchurch Boys' High School, and left in 1921 to manage a farm near Lumsden owned by his father. In 1926, Alley began studying at Canterbury University College, from where he graduated with a Master of Arts with first-class honours in 1932. His thesis was entitled Experiment in rural adult education. He was also awarded a Diploma of Social Sciences in 1930.

Alley married Euphan Margaret Jamieson in 1930; they had two sons and two daughters.

== Rugby union ==
A lock, Alley represented Southland and Canterbury at a provincial level, and was a member of the New Zealand national side, the All Blacks, in 1926 and 1928. He played 19 matches for the All Blacks including three tests.

Alley wrote a book on the 1930 tour of New Zealand by the British Lions, entitled With the British rugby team in New Zealand, 1930.

In the lead-up to the 1960 All Blacks tour of South Africa, Alley was a member of a pressure group, the New Zealand Citizens' All Black Tour Association, that opposed the exclusion of Māori players from the team imposed by the South African authorities.

== Library career ==
Alley worked as a travelling WEA (Workers' Educational Association) tutor sponsored by the Carnegie Foundation, before becoming head of the new Country Library Service in 1937, director of the National Library Service in 1945, and New Zealand's first national librarian at the National Library of New Zealand in 1964. He retired at the end of 1967, and was described by National Party MP Tom Shand as "one of New Zealand's greatest public servants".

In 1953, Alley was awarded the Queen Elizabeth II Coronation Medal. He was elected a Fellow of the New Zealand Library Association in 1955, and in the 1958 Queen's Birthday Honours, he was appointed an Officer of the Order of the British Empire, in recognition of his service as director of the National Library Service.

== Later life and death ==
Following his retirement, Alley lived on a two-acre farm in Upper Hutt that he purchased in 1946. From 1968 to 1971, he was visiting professor at the University of Western Ontario School of Library and Information Science. He died at his farm in 1986.
