= Beijing Bailie University =

Vocational college in Haidian, Beijing, China

- 北京培黎职业学院
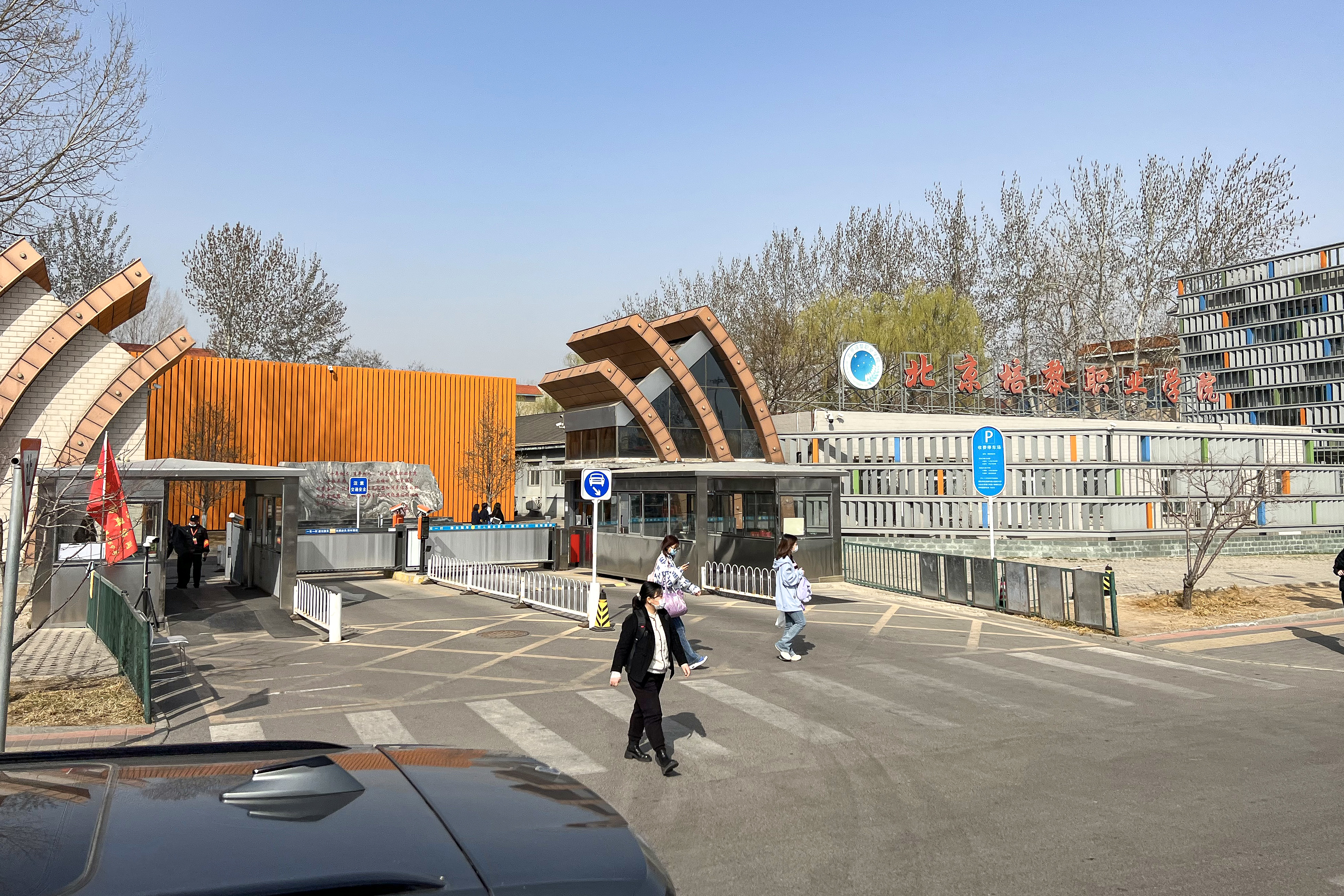
- School gate
- Motto: 手脑并用，创造分析
- Motto in English: Hands and mind together, create and analyze
- Type: Vocational college
- Established: May 28, 1983
- Founder: Rewi Alley
- Location: 1 Shuangqing Rd, Dongsheng, Haidian District, Beijing, China; 40.019181°N 116.339772°E
- Website: www.bjpldx.edu.cn

The Beijing Bailie University (BBU; Chinese: 北京培黎职业学院; pinyin: Běijīng Péilí zhíyè xuéyuàn), previously known in English as Peili Vocational Institute, is a university in Beijing.

Founded in May, 1983, the Beijing Bailie University is one of the earliest non-governmental institutions of higher education officially approved by the Beijing Municipal People's Government, and documented by the Ministry of Education of the People's Republic of China. It is a full-time vocational college for various professional training, including foreign language, computing, law, accounting, international business, art, and hospitality departments. BBU's qualified to independently issue diplomas and certificates which are recognized by the Chinese government. There are currently more than 7,000 students in total.

== Founded by Rewi Alley ==
BBU was founded by Rewi Alley and is named after Joseph Bailie. Its history dates back to the resistance to the Japanese invasion of China. Alley's role continues to be is acknowledged with his likeness appearing on the top of the home page of the BBU website together with his motto for the school which was 'train for the dawn' of the New China. The name Beijing Bailie University came from a proposal of Alley who was committed to promoting the educational thought of integrating study with practice initiated by an old American educator Joseph Bailie in China. Alley and his close friend Dr. George Hatem were the first two honorary presidents of the university. They hoped that the traditional spirit of the old Shandan Bailie School created in wartime would be passed on in China through the generations.

The university also adopted the old Shandan school motto of 'Hands and mind, create and analyze' as the university's motto. The university has played a significant role in practicing and exploring China's structural reform of higher education, being acknowledged as of one of the more influential non-governmental universities in Beijing and throughout China. Up until 2011, BBU's had trained more than 20,000 qualified graduates.

== Visit by Premier Wen Jiabao ==
On April 12, 2008, Premier Wen Jiabao inscribed the university motto 'Hands and mind, create and analyze' formulated by two great friends of China, Rewi Alley from New Zealand, and George Hogg from Britain who established the Bailie Technical School in Shandan, Gansu Province in early 1940s. Premier Wen also wrote a letter in reply to BBU's students in which he affirmed the successes of the Beijing Bailie University.

== Agreement with New Zealand China Friendship Society ==
On September 3, 2011, BBU signed an agreement with the New Zealand China Friendship Society (NZCFS) which included two-way academic exchange and reception of visitors and delegations, and promotion of New Zealand and BBU as centres of excellence for study. The agreement was signed by BBU President Yu Lin and NZCFS Vice President Dave Bromwich. At the signing Bromwich acknowledged the significance of the legacy Rewi Alley has left for the relationship between the people of New Zealand and China, in the Gung Ho cooperative movement and in the Bailie Education system.
