= Crawford Somerset =

Teacher, adult education director, university professor, writer

Hugh Crawford Dixon Somerset (29 August 1895 – 16 May 1968) was a notable New Zealand teacher, adult education director, university professor and writer. He was born in Belfast, North Canterbury, New Zealand in 1895. He graduated from Canterbury College with a master's thesis in 1931.

He was married to Gwen Somerset, also a notable educator.
