= Maud Russell (social worker) =

American educator and writer

Maud Russell

Maud Muriel Russell (August 9, 1893 – November 8, 1989) was an American social worker, educator, and writer. She is best remembered for her work as a social and political activist for the YWCA in China from 1917 to 1943. Returning to New York, she served as the executive director of the Committee for a Democratic Far Eastern Policy from 1946 to 1951 and contributed to the journal Far East Reporter from 1953 until her death from lung cancer in 1989.

Russell was outspoken on the Cultural Revolution in the 1960s and 1970s and wrote many works and articles documenting it. In 1971, she was one of the inaugural members of the United States-China People's Friendship Association.

== Early life and education ==
Of British descent, Russell was born in Hayward, California. Her parents were Thomas Russell and Lelia May (née Smalley); siblings included Jean, Thomas, Lloyd, Lelia, and David. Russell studied at University of California, Berkeley, where she began her affiliation with the Young Women's Christian Association, and here she met Mary Ingle Bentley (1878–1940), who became her life companion. She studied for her master's degree at Columbia University.

== Career ==
Russell arrived in China in 1917. Upon arrival, she studied the language in Nanjing, and was subsequently appointed by the YWCA at a post in Changsha in Hunan. She worked in Changsha from 1919 to 1924, and later from 1928 to 1930, and again in 1932 to 1933. When Changsha was invaded by the revolutionary army of Chiang Kai-shek in 1930, Russell refused to leave the city and was mistakenly thought to have perished; a memorial service was held for her.

During the 1930s, a turbulent and dangerous time to work in China during civil war and war with Japan, she worked mainly at the headquarters of the YWCA in Shanghai. She participated in a Marxist study group which included the likes of Rewi Alley, Lily Haass, Talitha Gerlach and Cora Deng.

Russell departed China in 1943, and began working for the YWCA in Passaic, New Jersey the following year. She was appointed executive director of the Committee for a Democratic Far Eastern Policy in 1946, which she held for 6 years. In 1953, Russell began lecturing on contemporary China and began working on a self-published journal, Far East Reporter, which she contributed to until her death in 1989. The Far East Reporter was described as a "magazine devoted to friendship and better understanding between the people of the U.S. and China".

In the early 1950s, she was accused of being a member of the Communist Party and was called to appear before the United States Senate Subcommittee on Internal Security. The New York Times writes that she "invoked her Fifth Amendment privilege against involuntary self-incrimination when asked if she was a member". Russell was outspoken on the Cultural Revolution in the 1960s and 1970s and wrote many works and articles documenting it. She pointed out that the "Chinese view the Cultural Revolution as a protracted struggle requiring many campaigns and revolutions in the cultural sphere, but that they are confident of victory and place their hope in China's young people, the tens of millions who will carry on the struggle". In New York in the summer of 1971, Russell was one of the inaugural members of the US–China Peoples Friendship Association (USCPFA), and revisited the country in 1972.

She was diagnosed with lung cancer in early summer 1989 and died at her home in New York on November 8, 1989 at the age of 96. After her death, she was described as a "truly remarkable person", who "led an extraordinary life of social and political activism".

== Selected works ==
- Some background on China's great proletarian cultural revolution
- The rising national liberation struggles of the peoples in a key area of Southeast Asia
- (1951) American policy in Asia
- (1956) China "uncivilized"? : millenniums of achievement and contribution to the West
- (1960) New people in new China; some personal glimpses of people in China
- (196?) The great proletarian revolution and China's economic health

== Bibliography ==
- Garner, Karen (June 1, 2009). Precious Fire: Maud Russell and the Chinese Revolution. Univ of Massachusetts Press. ISBN 978-1-55849-754-2.
- Sasaki-Gayle, Motoe (2009). Entangled with Empire: American Women and the Creation of the 'New Woman' in China, 1898—1937. ISBN 978-0-549-93928-3.
- Wu, Xiaoxin (July 17, 2015). Christianity in China: A Scholars' Guide to Resources in the Libraries and Archives of the United States. Routledge. ISBN 978-1-317-47468-5.
