= Felix Mann =

German-born acupuncturist (1931–2014)

- Born: 10 April 1931; Frankfurt/Main, Germany
- Died: 2 October 2014 (aged 83); Shropshire, England
- Education: Malvern College, Christ's College, Cambridge and Westminster Hospital
- Occupations: Medical Doctor and Acupuncturist
- Known for: Publications and innovations in the field of acupuncture
- Spouse: Ruth Csorba v. Borsa
- Children: Dr. Maria-Ruth Morello (stepdaughter)
- Website: http://www.felixmann.co.uk (archived version)

Felix Mann (10 April 1931 – 2 October 2014) was a German-born acupuncturist. He devised the system known as Scientific Acupuncture and was the founder and past president of the Medical Acupuncture Society (1959–1980). He was also the first president of the British Medical Acupuncture Society (1980), and the author of the first comprehensive English language acupuncture textbook Acupuncture: The Ancient Chinese Art of Healing first published in 1962. In 1995, he received The German Pain Prize. Mann, who was based in England, also lectured internationally on medical acupuncture. Mann distanced himself from traditional beliefs in the existence of acupuncture points and meridians.

== Criticism of basic acupuncture concepts ==
Mann distanced himself from traditional beliefs in the existence of acupuncture points and meridians. He stated in his book Reinventing Acupuncture: A New Concept of Ancient Medicine:

"The traditional acupuncture points are no more real than the black spots a drunkard sees in front of his eyes." (p. 14)

"Many acupuncture points are in practice like McBurney’s point, in that both the position and size of the point vary enormously" (p. 14)

And regarding meridians...

"The meridians of acupuncture are no more real than the meridians of geography. If someone were to get a spade and tried to dig up the Greenwich meridian, he might end up in a lunatic asylum. Perhaps the same fate should await those doctors who believe in [acupuncture] meridians." (p. 31)

Regarding the whole meridian system:

"... the original, probably correct, observations were taken up by scholars who then processed something simple into something complicated, in their masterful, scholarly way. Possibly they wished the meridians in microcosm man to simulate the pathway of the planets in the celestial macrocosm and thus produced the truly amazing course of the meridians, coursing three times round the whole body.

"However, despite the fact that I criticise the present description of acupuncture points and meridians, it will be apparent that I could never have evolved my own ideas without the stimulus of the traditional structures." (p. 36)

== New concepts ==
In his later years, Mann introduced some new acupuncture concepts he found important.

He regarded a significant part – perhaps as much as 50% of the patients – as strong reactors:

"These patients respond to acupuncture like magic. Their symptoms may be cured or alleviated within seconds or minutes of treatment, a treatment which involves only one or two needles and gentle stimulation." (p. 41)

Mann introduced a new acupuncture method that he regarded as stronger than traditional skin acupuncture: Periosteal acupuncture. (p. 91) This involves inserting the needles into the periosteum – almost all the way down to the bone.

== Publications ==
- Reinventing Acupuncture: A New Concept of Ancient Medicine: (1992) 1st edition, also in German and Italian; (1996) Revised 1st edition; (2000) 2nd edition.
- Textbook of Acupuncture (1987) Omnibus
- Scientific Aspects of Acupuncture (1977) 1st edition; (1982) 2nd edition, also in Japanese.
- Acupuncture: Cure of Many Diseases (1971) 1st edition; (1972) Pan edition; (1972) USA edition; (1972) Revised edition, also in Spanish, Dutch, Finnish, German, Italian, Swedish; (1992) 2nd edition.
- Atlas of Acupuncture (1966), 13 reprints
- The Meridians of Acupuncture (1964), also in Italian
- The Treatment of Disease by Acupuncture (1963); (1967) 2nd edition; (1974) 3rd edition
- Acupuncture: The Ancient Chinese Art of Healing (1962); (1962) Revised; (1971) 2nd edition; (1973) Revised edition; (1981) 3rd edition; (1963) & (1972) USA editions, also in Italian
