= Ma Haide =

American-born Chinese doctor (1910–1988)

- Chinese: 馬海德
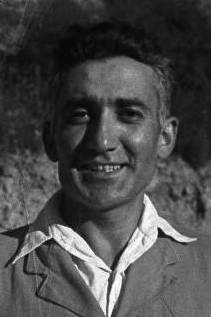
- Ma in 1944
- Born: Shafick George Hatem; September 26, 1910; Buffalo, New York, U.S.
- Died: October 3, 1988 (aged 78); Beijing, China
- Resting place: Babaoshan Revolutionary Cemetery, Beijing, China
- Occupation: Doctor
- Political party: Chinese Communist Party

Ma Haide
- Simplified Chinese: 马海德
- Traditional Chinese: 馬海德
Transcriptions
Standard Mandarin
- Hanyu Pinyin: Mǎ Hǎidé
- Wade–Giles: Ma3 Hai3-te2

Ma Haide (simplified Chinese: 马海德; traditional Chinese: 馬海德; pinyin: Mǎ Hǎidé; September 26, 1910 – October 3, 1988), born Shafick George Hatem (Arabic: جورج شفيق حاتم), was an American-born Chinese doctor who practiced medicine in China. He was the first foreigner to become a naturalized citizen of the People's Republic of China.

== Family and early life ==
Ma Haide was born Shafick George Hatem on September 26, 1910, into a Lebanese-American family in Buffalo, New York.

His father Nahoum Salaama Hatem (Arabic: ناحوم سلامة حاتم) moved to the United States from the village of Hammana in the Metn mountains of Lebanon in 1902, to take a job at a textile mill in Lawrence, Massachusetts. In 1909, on a trip to Lebanon, Nahoum married Thamam Joseph (Arabic: تمام جوزيف), a woman two years younger from the village of Bahannes. Soon after being married, the Hatem family moved to Buffalo, New York, where Nahoum took a job at a steel mill. It was in Buffalo where their first child, George, was born on September 26, 1910.

George Hatem's parents were of Maronite background. Some older sources claim that the family was of Syrian Jewish extraction, but according to modern biographers, that was a misconception, although quite common even during Hatem's life.

In 1923 Hatem's father sent him to live in Greenville, North Carolina, and the rest of the family joined him a few years later and opened a dry goods store. He graduated as valedictorian of the 1927 class of Greenville High School. Hatem focused on pre-med classes at the University of North Carolina, where he was a member of The Dialectic and Philanthropic Societies. He then studied medicine at the American University in Beirut and the University of Geneva.

While in Geneva, "Shag", as he was then nicknamed, became acquainted with students from East Asia, and learned much about China. With financial help from the parents of one of his friends, he and several others set off to Shanghai to establish a medical practice to concentrate on venereal diseases and on basic health care for the needy.

== Career ==
=== Shanghai ===
On August 3, 1933, Hatem and two colleagues, Lazar Katz and Robert Levinson, boarded a ship in Trieste that took him to several ports in Asia including Singapore and Hong Kong. On September 5, the three young American doctors landed in Shanghai.

Hatem set up practice in Shanghai and changed his name to Ma Hai-te (Ma Haide). As he came to know Shanghai and its inequalities, he also came to know three people who shaped the ideas he used to interpret what he saw: the well known journalist Agnes Smedley, the New Zealand activist Rewi Alley, and the presiding figure among left-wing sympathizers, Soong Ching-ling, the widow of Sun Yat-sen. Rewi Alley was to be his friend and mentor for the next five decades, Mme. Soong was to provide key introductions, and Smedley, who heard of Hatem by reading one of his pamphlets on public health, introduced him to Liu Ding. Liu, a liaison for the Chinese Communist Party (CCP), was described as a "young Red engineer" who awakened Hatem's heart.

By 1936, disgusted by the corruption of Shanghai and alarmed by the world drift towards fascism, he decided that he would either go to Spain to support the Republican government or join the communist movement in Northeast China. He closed his practice and, with the help of the earlier established CCP contacts, was smuggled across Kuomintang lines to provide medical service to Mao Zedong's troops.

=== Yan'an ===
In the summer of 1936, Ma travelled to the CCP headquarters at Bao'an (present-day Zhidan), temporary capital of the CCP-controlled Shaanxi-Gansu-Ningxia Border Region. He was accompanied by the pioneering American journalist Edgar Snow. At Hatem's request, he was not explicitly mentioned in the first edition of Snow's famous book, Red Star Over China. He is there anonymously as a Western-trained doctor who had examined Mao and determined he was not dying of some mysterious disease, which was the rumor at the time.

As the war with Japan started in earnest in 1937, Ma Haide sent requests to Soong Ching-ling, Agnes Smedley, and other notables to organize recruitment of foreign medical personnel for the communists' troops fighting the Japanese armies in northern China. He was among those meeting Norman Bethune when Bethune arrived to Yan'an in late March 1938, and was instrumental in helping Bethune get started at his task of organizing medical services for the front and the region.

He was present at Yan'an when the Dixie Mission, an American civilian and military group, arrived in July 1944. Ma was a source of surprise and comfort for many of the Americans when they met the American born physician. Many accounts of the mission make reference to Haide. Known commonly to the group as "Doc Ma," Ma periodically assisted Major Melvin Casberg in studies of the state of medical treatment in the CCP-controlled territories.

== Post-war life ==
Ma remained a doctor with the CCP until their victory in 1949, afterwards becoming a public health official. He was the first foreigner granted citizenship in the People's Republic of China (PRC). He is credited with helping to eliminate leprosy and many venereal diseases in post-war China, for which he received the Lasker Award for public service in 1986. He was one of the few persons who were not born in China to hold a position of trust and authority in the People's Republic of China. His Chinese name can be loosely translated to mean "Horse" (last name, commonly used by Chinese Muslims) and "Virtue From the Sea" (first name).

Ma was the first foreigner to become a naturalized citizen of the PRC. In the 1950s, Ma was secretly granted Chinese citizenship, but he retained his American passport until the 1960s. Despite his reputation as the most loved American in China, he was denounced during the Cultural Revolution as a "bourgeois lackey."

There is an extensive interview with him in the Canadian Broadcasting Corporation's groundbreaking 90 min documentary by Patrick Watson, The Seven Hundred Million (1964).

== Honors and awards ==
During his lifetime, he was honored in his father's hometown of Hammana in Lebanon, where the main square of the city is named after him.

In 1986, Ma received the Albert Lasker Public Service Award for his contributions to the control and eradication of venereal diseases and leprosy in China.

== Personal life ==
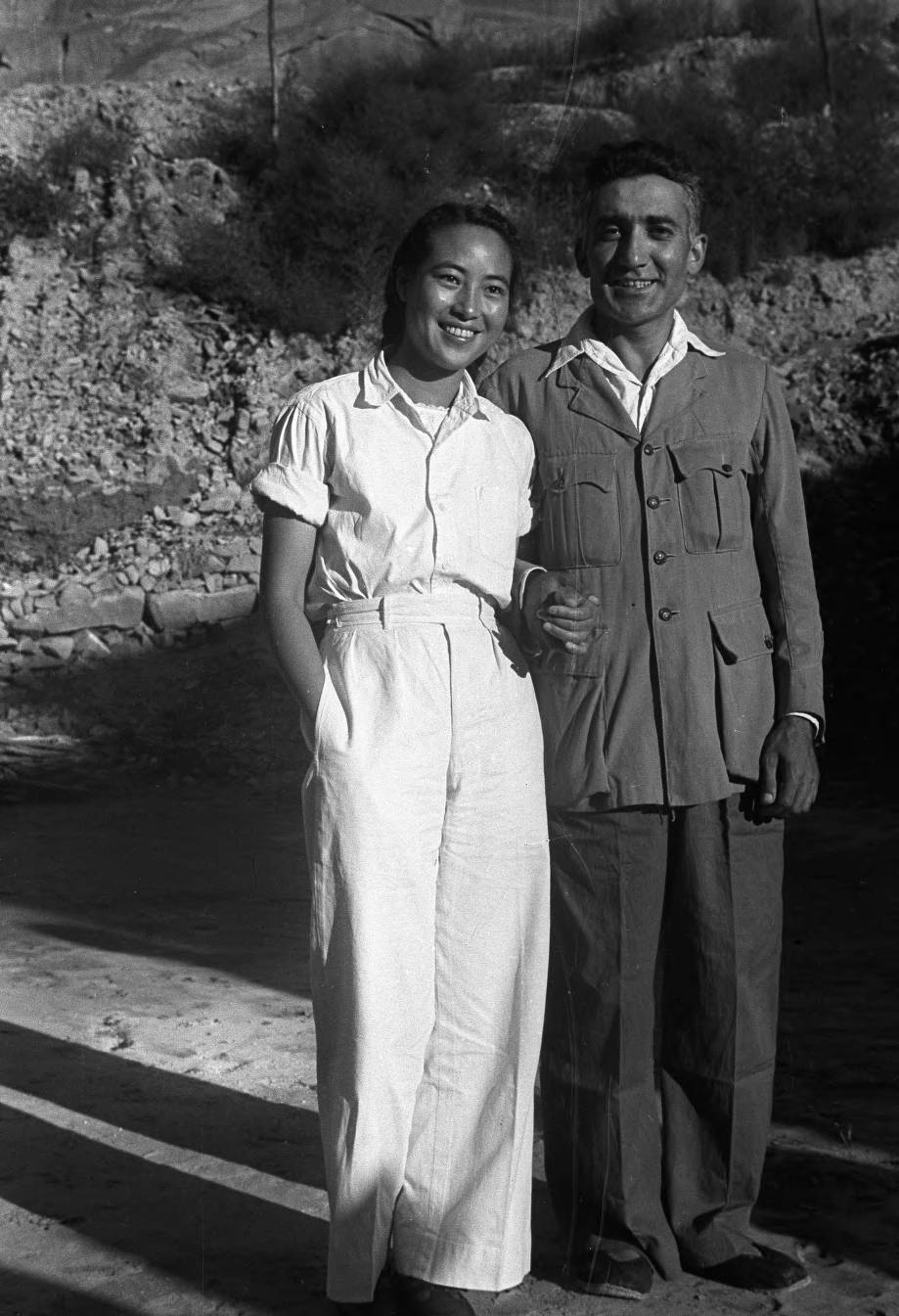
Ma Haide and Chou Sufei in 1944

Ma's wife was Chou Sufei (aka Zhou Sufei 周苏菲), an actress. They had a son Chou Youma (aka Zhou Youma 周幼马) (b. 1943) and a daughter Liang Bi.

On October 3, 1988, Ma died in Beijing at the age of 78. He is buried at the Babaoshan Revolutionary Cemetery in Beijing, China.

== Sources ==
- Porter, Edgar A (1997), The People's Doctor: George Hatem and China's Revolution, University of Hawaii Press, ISBN 0-8248-1905-5. Partial text on Google Books.
- Snow, Edgar. The Other Side of the River: Red China Today. New York: Random House, 1962.
