= Ruth Weiss (journalist) =

Chinese-Austrian journalist

Ruth Felicitas Weiss
- Weiss in 2006
- Born: December 11, 1908; Vienna, Austria
- Died: March 6, 2006 (aged 97); Beijing, China
- Other name: Wei Lushi (魏璐诗)
- Occupations: Educator, journalist
- Known for: Being the last surviving European eyewitness of the birth of People's Republic of China
- Spouse: Yeh Hsuan
- Children: 2 Sons

Ruth F. Weiss (December 11, 1908 – March 6, 2006), also known by her Chinese name, Wèi Lùshī (Chinese: 魏璐诗), was a Chinese educator and journalist. She was the last surviving European eyewitness of the Chinese Communist Revolution and the beginnings of the People’s Republic of China.

== Biography ==
Weiss was born in Vienna, and graduated in German and English Studies from the University of Vienna. In 1933 she travelled to Shanghai, a city that before World War II attracted many European émigrés including revolutionaries from the Spanish Civil War, Jews and other refugees escaping the Nazis. She decided to stay, as did many others, and became fascinated by the social and political goals of the unfolding Chinese Revolution.

Initially Weiss worked as a freelance journalist in Shanghai. Later she became a teacher at the Jewish School in Shanghai, at the School of the Chinese Committee of Intellectual Cooperation, and at the West China Union University. After working briefly as a secretary at the Canadian embassy in Chongqing in 1944, she became a correspondent at the United Nations Picture News Office (联合国影闻宣传处) in 1945 and joined the China Welfare Fund (中国福利会). One year later she took up a post at the Radio Division of the United Nations Organization in New York. Weiss worked as a teacher at the Jewish School in Shanghai, and married Yeh Hsuan, a Chinese engineer, with whom she had two children and went to the U.S. so he could pursue studies at MIT. Once the Chinese Communist Revolution reached a climax in 1949, however, Weiss returned with her children to China, leaving Yeh in the U.S. After she returned to China she became a lecturer for the Verlag für fremdsprachige Literatur (Publishing House for Foreign Literature) in Beijing from 1952 to 1965. In 1965 she worked as a journalist for "China im Bild" (人民画报).

Ruth Weiss was one of about one hundred foreign-born residents to receive Chinese citizenship in 1955. In 1983 she was named one of eleven foreign experts by the Chinese Communist Party that were part of membership of the Chinese People's Political Consultative Conference. She died in Beijing, aged 97.

== Works ==
- "Die Peking-Oper" by Eva Siao, German by Ruth Weiss, Publisher Neue Welt, Beijing, 1958
- "Das kleine China-Handbuch", Verlag für fremdsprachige Literatur (Publishing House for Foreign Literature), Beijing, 1958
- "Die Briefmarken der Volksrepublik China", Verlag für fremdsprachige Literatur, Beijing, 1958
- "Am Rande der Geschichte - Mein Leben in China", Zeller-Verlag Osnabrück 1999; Neuauflage 2005 wagener-edition, ISBN 3-937283-06-4
