= Deng Yuzhi =

Chinese Social and Christian activist

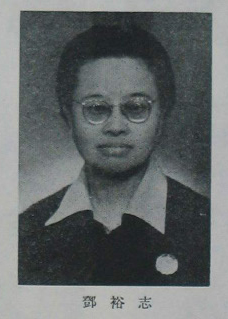
- Yuzhi in 1949
- Born: September 1900
- Died: October 1, 1996 (aged 96)
- Political party: Chinese Communist Party

Deng Yuzhi (Chinese: 邓裕志, September 1900–October 1, 1996) also known as Cora Deng, was a Chinese social and Christian activist, and a feminist. Born in Hubei, she promoted women's education and rights, and defied the traditional woman's role in Chinese society. A Protestant by birth, she was an active and leading member of the Chinese Young Women's Christian Association (YWCA). She established night schools for the women workers of industrial establishments, and fought for their rights. At the age of 19, she participated in the May Fourth Movement, and, on the establishment of the People's Republic, held positions in the Chinese Communist Party (CCP) administration.

In her student days, Deng was introduced to social and revolutionary ideology by Maud Russell. But Deng did not perceive herself as a feminist or a revolutionary, relying instead on Christianity as a source of her identity; her social activism was triggered by her religious beliefs.

== Early years and education ==
Deng Yuzhi was born in 1900 in Shashi, Hubei Province. Her family had large land holdings and pursued business enterprises. Her father worked for the Qing dynasty. She was eight years old when she moved with her family from Shashi to Changsha in Hunan province. Her primary education occurred at the First Women's Normal School of Hunan Province, and the Zhounan Girls Middle School (established in 1906), which promoted "progressive, modern curriculum and student's activism during the republican revolutionary era." Her parents died in 1910 when she was 10 years old, at which time she was taken care of by her grandmother who admitted her to the Fuxiang School run by the Protestant Mission for Girls.

While in school she developed liberal views on a woman's role in Chinese society as a result of her association with the May Fourth Movement and her Christian faith. She decided to be an independent woman, remain unmarried, and live the life of a "new woman". The first step she took in this regard was to break the Chinese traditional practice of arranged marriage. While in high school, in spite of her resolve not get married, her grandmother persuaded her to marry as the grandmother had been engaged at a young age. Deng agreed on the condition that after marriage, she would be allowed to continue her studies, find work, follow her Christian faith, and would not be forced to observe traditional Chinese religious dogmas. But after marriage, her husband and his family broke their promises to Deng which resulted in her leaving her husband to continue her studies. She entered Ginling College in Nanjing around 1923, studying applied sociology.

== Career ==
Deng started working at this time with the woman brocade workers in support of their causes, albeit her husband pursued her to return to the marriage. But Matilda Thurston, president of Ginling College, intervened and sent Deng to Shanghai to join the YWCA in 1921, and in the next few years, she moved several time. After returning to Changsha, she met Maud Russell who was working at the YWCA who offered her employment. Then Deng's divorce came through and she was able to lead an independent life, continuing her work with the YWCA. After the bitter marriage, she resolved to work exclusively on social work and not to marry again. With professional and financial help from Russell, she participated in international conferences and in the middle of 1920s, she continued her studies at the London School of Economics with a scholarship for one year. After her studies, she interned with the International Labour Organization (ILO) in Geneva, learning about the security and rights of women and child workers. In the late 1920s and early 1930s, with her return to China, she headed the Students and Workers's Departments in YWCA and eventually became General Secretary of the Chinese YWCA. She also worked as a consultant from time to time to the YWCA of Changshu, Shanghai, Wuhan, Chongqing, Guiyang, Kunming, and Hong Kong. She then established night schools in Shanghai and Guangzhou for women workers. In the later part of 1930s, she was sponsored for graduate studies at Columbia University. While serving as the head of the YWCA Industrial Department, Deng reopened schools for women workers in the factory districts. These schools provided impetus for organizing labor into political stream.

During the Second Sino-Japanese War, Deng took the initiative to organize and convince women workers of YWCA Shanghai to work in the war front, tending the sick and wounded soldiers. She also created "refugee camps and welfare stations for the families of soldiers", and helped soldiers write letters to their families. She convinced the then Kuomintang (KMT) government to honor the compensation rights due to the families of soldiers. In 1938, she established the YWCA national office in Wuhan. At this time, the KMT and CCP were united in the Second United Front, and Deng coordinated with Soong Mayling of KMT and Deng Yingchao of CCP in the war effort of relief and rehabilitation. In 1938, Deng was invited by Soong Mayling to take part in a conference of women leaders in different fields, which included women from the communists group, to have a unified approach to address women's issues.

In 1948, when the People's Republic of China became a reality, Deng was one of the persons among many religious leaders invited to advise PRC on religious issues. Following CCP, Deng joined the Tiananmen Square celebration on 1 October 1949 at the invitation extended to her by Mao Zedong and other members of the party. In 1950, she assumed the role of general secretary of YMCA and was the official representative of the CCP at the All-China Women's Federation and the Chinese People's Political Consultative Conference. As Secretary of YMCA, she pursued the organization's role on women's issues with emphasis on Christian thoughts. She was then appointed as the vice-chair of a committee set up to decide on the status of the Chinese Christian Church as an independent identity, without control from external organizations. In 1950, she became a member of the East China Military and Political Committee, elected as an executive member of the China Relief Society, and as an executive member of the Red Cross Society of China. Deng died in 1996.
