= Death of Zhou Enlai =

State funeral in January 1976

Zhou Enlai
- Part of Official portrait, 1950s
- Date: January 8, 1976
- Time: 9:57 Beijing time
- Duration: January 8th to 15th, 1976
- Location: People's Republic of China Beijing People's Liberation Army 305th Hospital

Zhou Enlai, one of the principal founders and top leaders of the Chinese Communist Party (CCP) and the People's Republic of China, died at 9:57 a.m. on January 8, 1976, at the age of 77, from bladder cancer at the 305 Hospital in Beijing. At the time of his death, he held several major positions, including Vice Chairman of the Chinese Communist Party, Premier of the State Council, and Chairman of the National Committee of the Chinese People's Political Consultative Conference. Zhou's death marked a pivotal moment in Chinese politics, triggering an outpouring of public mourning, exposing deep political divisions within the CCP, and setting in motion a chain of events that culminated in the Tiananmen Incident of April 1976.

== Late-life illness ==
=== 1972 ===
On May 12, 1972, Zhou Enlai's health care doctor conducted a routine urine test once a month and found that the number of red blood cells under the microscope was too high. On May 18, after consultation with several urology experts including Wu Jieping, Yu Songting, Xiong Rucheng, Yu Huiyuan, and Wu Decheng, it was determined that the disease was "bladder transitional cell carcinoma" Wu Jieping and others immediately reported Zhou Enlai's condition to the higher authorities, hoping that he could be treated as soon as possible. However, Chairman Mao Zedong of the CPC Central Committee issued four instructions to them through Wang Dongxing, Director of the General Office of the CPC Central Committee: First, keep it confidential and do not tell the Premier and Deng Xiaoping; second, do not examine; third, do not operate; and fourth, strengthen nutrition and care. Regarding treatment, Mao Zedong said: "Surgery can easily spread the disease and is dangerous. Can we use traditional Chinese medicine to control the disease?" He also stated: "You surgeons always perform surgery, and every one of them dies. Didn't General Chen die during surgery? Didn't Xie Fuzhi also die during surgery?

=== 1973 ===
On January 5, 1973, Zhou Enlai experienced significant blood in his urine (hematuria) due to delayed treatment. However, it was not until March 10, when he was admitted to Yuquan Mountain, that he underwent a cystoscopy. The procedure, which involved electrocautery to treat the tumor on the bladder mucosa, was initially effective, and his urine returned to normal. However, the planned chemotherapy, scheduled to take place twice a week after the surgery, was not carried out as intended. In late October, Zhou Enlai again experienced blood in his urine, but due to the political climate surrounding the "Criticize Lin, Criticize Confucius" Movement, he did not receive timely treatment.

=== 1974 ===
In early 1974, Zhou Enlai's health deteriorated significantly, and he began experiencing recurrent hematuria. On March 12, 1974, doctors performed a second cystoscopy followed by electrocautery treatment, but the bleeding returned shortly afterward, indicating limited effectiveness of the procedure. According to the instructions of the Political Bureau of the CPC Central Committee, he continued to receive conservative medication and blood transfusion treatment. During this period, a large amount of blood accumulated in Zhou Enlai's bladder, forming clots that blocked the internal opening of the urethra and caused severe pain. In early May 1974, urine pathology tests detected detached tissue masses from papillary carcinoma of the bladder. Subsequently, Wu Jieping and other physicians again requested a meeting with central leaders, recommending prompt surgical intervention.

On June 1, 1974, Zhou Enlai was admitted to the PLA 305 Hospital, where he underwent his first bladder cancer surgery, resulting in temporary improvement. However, in early August, his condition worsened due to cancer recurrence and metastasis. With approval from the Political Bureau of the CPC Central Committee, he underwent further medical procedures, including another major operation. His condition stabilized for a time, and he was able to manage basic daily activities.

It was later revealed that Zhou had been diagnosed with colon cancer a year earlier, but treatment had been delayed due to official duties, including a trip to Changsha to report to Mao Zedong on preparations for the 4th National People's Congress.

=== 1975 ===
In March 1975, medical examinations revealed a tumor in Zhou Enlai's large intestine near the liver. On March 26, he underwent a right hemicolectomy to treat colon cancer, along with additional procedures related to his bladder cancer. Following the surgery, his health remained fragile.

On July 1, 1975, Zhou Enlai took a group photo with some of his staff and said, "This is the last time I will take a photo with you. I hope you will not slap me in the face in the future." Between August and September, Zhou Enlai's urine pathology test showed that he had squamous cell carcinoma. On September 20, he underwent a major operation. On that day, Deng Xiaoping, Zhang Chunqiao, Li Xiannian, Wang Dongxing and Deng Yingchao were waiting in the hospital. Zhou Enlai was reported to have affirmed his loyalty to the CCP and the people before undergoing surgery, rejecting any suggestion of capitulation. During the operation, the doctor found that the cancer cells had spread throughout the body and could not be cured. Deng Xiaoping immediately instructed the medical team to do everything they could to "reduce pain and prolong life." After late October, Zhou Enlai was basically bedridden, defecating and urinating in bed, and eating through a nasogastric tube. The use of large doses of broad-spectrum antibiotics can cause intestinal flora imbalance, diarrhea, and subsequent systemic fungal infection, persistent high fever, and heart and kidney failure.

In mid-November 1975, Wang Dongxing and Ji Dengkui convened a small-scale meeting in the Fujian Hall of the Great Hall of the People. Participants included Guo Yufeng, then Minister of the Organization Department of the CPC Central Committee, and Zheng Pingnian, then Deputy Minister, as well as Zhou Qicai, who worked in the Secretariat of the General Office of the CPC Central Committee. The content of the meeting was to prepare for Zhou Enlai's funeral in advance according to the instructions of the CPC Central Committee. Afterwards, Zhou Qicai drafted the obituary and eulogy.

=== 1976 ===
On January 1, 1976, Zhou Enlai was already dying and had been in a coma for a long time. When he woke up, he heard on the radio two newly published poems written by Mao Zedong in 1965, "Shui Tiao Ge Tou: Re-ascending Jinggang Mountain" and "Nian Nu Jiao: Birds' Questions and Answers". He asked the staff to buy a copy of the poems and listen to the two poems. After reading, he asked to put the copy of the poems next to his pillow. In addition, Zhou Enlai also asked the staff around him to play the two songs "Daiyu Burying Flowers" and "Baoyu Crying for the Dead" from the Yue Opera "Dream of Red Mansions" all the time.

In the early morning of January 5, 1976, Zhou Enlai underwent his last treatment operation (colostomy) due to intestinal paralysis causing abdominal swelling and inability to defecate. Deng Xiaoping, Li Xiannian, Wang Dongxing and others came to visit and wait on him. In the afternoon and night, most members of the Politburo of the CPC Central Committee in Beijing received notice of Zhou Enlai's critical illness and went to the hospital to visit him in batches. On January 7, Zhou Enlai fell into a coma. Doctors used oxygen and nasogastric feeding to prolong his life. At 11 o'clock that night, Zhou Enlai was already in his last moments. He slightly opened his eyes, recognized Wu Jieping and others in front of him, and said in a weak voice: "I am fine here. You should go and take care of other sick comrades. You are needed more there..." These were Zhou Enlai's last words before his death.

== Death and commemoration ==
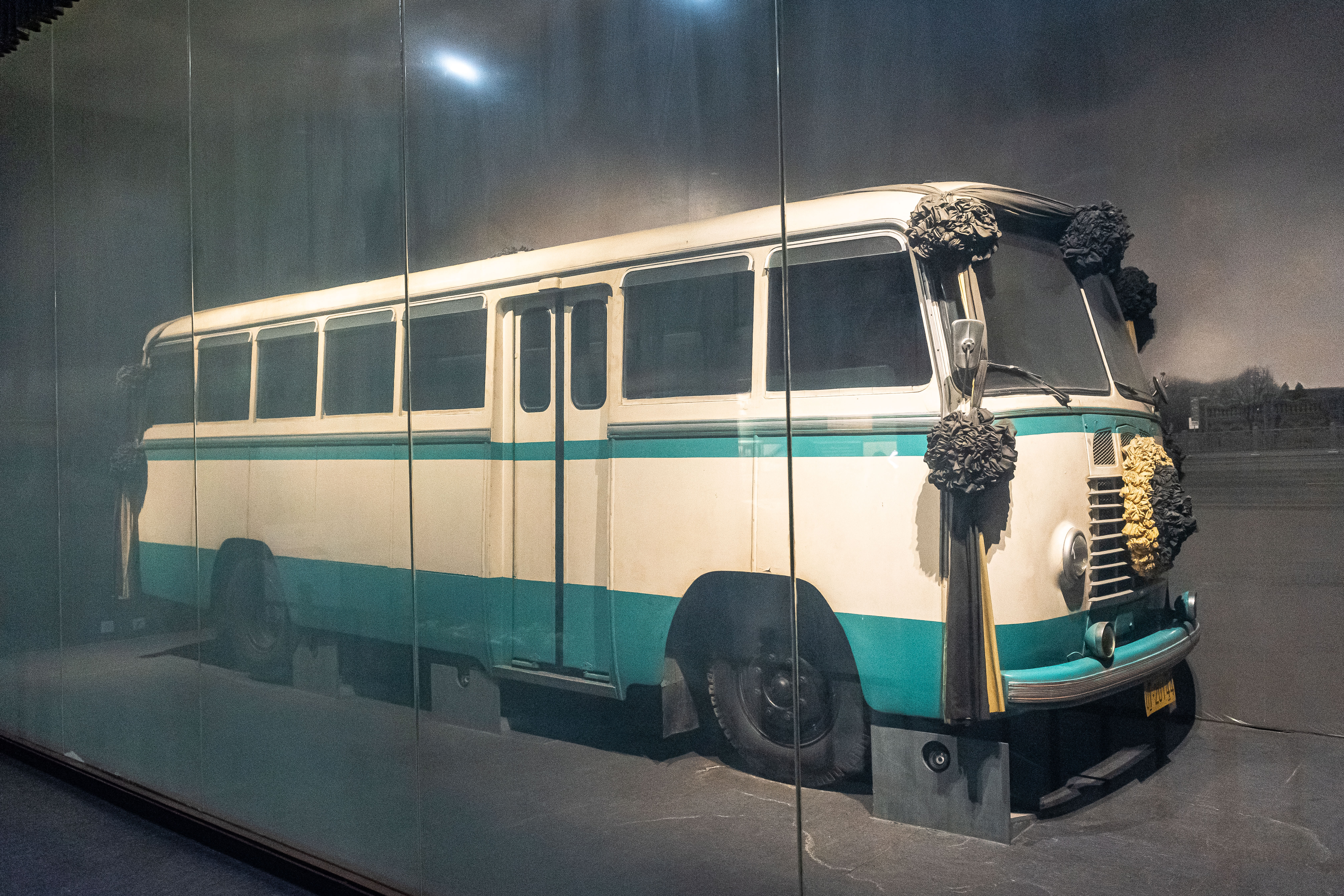
Zhou Enlai's hearse has been on display in the "Return Hall" of the Zhou Enlai Memorial Hall in Huai'an since January 8, 2016.

At 9:57 a.m. on January 8, 1976, Zhou Enlai died of bladder cancer at the 305th Hospital in Beijing at the age of 78. Deng Yingchao and members of the Politburo in Beijing rushed to the hospital to bid farewell to his body and arrange his funeral. "Deng Xiaoping's voice was trembling, and Ye Jianying's eyes were red from crying. She held Deng Yingchao's hand for a long time. Li Xiannian, Chen Yonggui, Su Zhenhua and others could no longer walk. Many of them had swollen eyes from crying, while Jiang Qing and others turned around and left immediately."

Zhou Enlai's body was sent to Beijing Hospital at noon on the 8th. According to his last wishes, an autopsy was performed and it was found that all major organs had cancer metastases. Zhu Dianhua, a barber from the Beijing Hotel, then gave Zhou Enlai a haircut. At 11 o'clock in the evening, after a haircut, dressing, cosmetic surgery and makeup, Zhou Enlai's body was placed in the morgue of Beijing Hospital. Reporters from Xinhua News Agency, CCTV and the Central News Documentary Film Studio rushed to the hospital to shoot footage, which lasted until late at night.

At 4:12 a.m. on January 9, China National Radio started broadcasting the obituary of Zhou Enlai issued by the CPC Central Committee, the Standing Committee of the National People's Congress, and the State Council, announcing the establishment of a funeral committee for Comrade Zhou Enlai consisting of 107 people including Mao Zedong, Wang Hongwen, Ye Jianying, Deng Xiaoping, and Zhu De. From the 9th to the 15th, flags were flown at half-mast at Tiananmen Square, Xinhua Gate, the Workers' Cultural Palace, and the Ministry of Foreign Affairs in the capital. On the street, "almost everyone had a heavy face," on the train, "the soldiers were beating their chests and crying bitterly," in offices, apartments, and schools, people were crying silently, "sobbing everywhere".

On January 10, the CPC Central Committee and the State Council issued a notice, deciding to hold a grand memorial service for Zhou Enlai in Beijing and across the country. On January 10 and 11, more than 10,000 CCP and state leaders and representatives of the masses went to Beijing Hospital to bid farewell to Zhou Enlai's body. Zhu De, Ye Jianying, Deng Xiaoping, Soong Ching Ling, Wang Hongwen, Jiang Qing, Zhang Chunqiao, Yao Wenyuan and others paid silent tribute to Zhou Enlai's body. Jiang Qing did not take off her hat when bidding farewell to the body, which caused strong dissatisfaction among those present and those watching the video. At the same time, many people who came spontaneously to participate in the farewell activities gathered in front of Beijing Hospital, hoping to see Zhou Enlai's remains and express their grief.

On the afternoon of January 11, Zhou Enlai's body was sent to Babaoshan Revolutionary Cemetery in Beijing for cremation. Millions of people in Beijing spontaneously gathered on both sides of Chang'an Avenue in front of Tiananmen Square to bid farewell to Zhou Enlai's hearse in the severe cold. The funeral procession began at 4:00 p.m. on January 11. Zhou Enlai's body was escorted by Wang Hongwen, Wang Dongxing, Deng Yingchao, as well as funeral committee staff and Zhou Enlai's friends. It departed from Beijing Hospital and was sent to Babaoshan Revolutionary Cemetery via Taijichang Street and Chang'an Avenue. People spontaneously gathered on both sides of the road to bid farewell to Zhou Enlai's hearse. Wherever the hearse went, there were cries of grief. This is the famous "Ten Miles of Street to Send Off the Premier". At 18:05 in the afternoon, the motorcade arrived at Babaoshan Revolutionary Cemetery. Zhou Enlai's body was placed in the second farewell room ( the east hall of Babaoshan Funeral Home ). Deng Yingchao reportedly bade farewell to Zhou Enlai with visible grief, saying, "Enlai, I'm here. Goodbye, let me take one last look at you." She was described as being highly emotional, and many of those present were also seen in tears. Afterwards, the body was cremated. Zhou Enlai's former guards Zhang Shuying and Gao Zhenpu took the ashes to the Workers' Cultural Palace for burial.

On the afternoon of January 12, the Political Bureau of the CPC Central Committee held a meeting to discuss matters related to eulogies and memorial services. Zhang Chunqiao proposed that Ye Jianying deliver a eulogy at the memorial service for Zhou Enlai, but Ye Jianying opposed this. Ye Jianying proposed that Deng Xiaoping deliver a eulogy, which was agreed to by the vast majority of the Political Bureau members present.

From January 12 to 14, more than 40,000 people from all walks of life in the capital held a grand mourning ceremony at the Working People's Cultural Palace. After the mourning ceremony, Zhou Enlai's ashes were moved to the Taiwan Hall of the Great Hall of the People. During the mourning period, people from all walks of life spontaneously or organized various forms of mourning activities to commemorate Zhou Enlai and express their grief. The Monument to the People's Heroes in the center of Tiananmen Square, engraved with Zhou Enlai's handwritten inscription, became the main venue for mourning and remembering Zhou Enlai. Within a few days, wreaths were placed around the monument, and the four pine walls were also decorated with white flowers. Similar mourning activities also appeared in Shanghai, Tianjin, Wuhan, Xi'an, Nanjing, Chongqing, Nanchang, Guangzhou and other large and medium-sized cities across the country, and continued to develop and expand.

On the afternoon of January 14, staff read to Mao Zedong the draft of the eulogy for Zhou Enlai's memorial service that the Central Committee had sent to him for review. Mao Zedong burst into tears.

After Zhou Enlai's death, leaders of more than 130 countries and political parties sent telegrams and letters of condolence to express their deep condolences to the CCP and government, and to show their deep respect for Zhou Enlai's great contributions to China and the world. At the same time, at a meeting of the United Nations Security Council, the president of the General Assembly proposed that all representatives stand up and observe a moment of silence in memory of Zhou Enlai. The United Nations also lowered its flag to half-mast to express its condolences.

== Subsequent events ==
Since the onset of the Cultural Revolution, long-suppressed dissatisfaction and political discontent had been accumulating in Chinese society. After Zhou Enlai's death, these sentiments found an outlet through widespread public mourning, which gradually evolved into a broader form of political expression. Slogans such as "Mourn Zhou, Support Deng, Oppose Jiang, Criticize Mao" reflected both respect for Zhou and veiled criticism of the ruling political faction known as the Gang of Four. In an internal report, Mao Zedong reportedly commented on the public mourning with the words: "The mourning is false; the restoration is real," implying that deeper political motives were at play.

In response, the Gang of Four, who controlled the propaganda apparatus, sought to suppress such sentiments. Yao Wenyuan ordered a media blackout on public mourning activities in Beijing and instructed the authorities to arrest some of the citizens who had gathered at Tiananmen Square.

On March 25, Wenhui Bao published a front-page article stating, "A certain capitalist-roader within the Party is trying to bring back those who have been toppled and remain unrepentant." The statement was widely interpreted as a veiled attack on Zhou Enlai and a warning against the political rehabilitation of Deng Xiaoping, sparking public outrage.

In the following days, students and workers in Nanjing took to the streets in protest against the Gang of Four. During the demonstrations, various protest slogans emerged, such as: "Drag out the Khrushchev-style careerist, conspirator, and two-faced person Zhang Chunqiao and expose him to the public!", "Whoever opposes Premier Zhou must be overthrown!", and "Expose the black hand behind Wenhui Bao!" These slogans, openly political in nature, expressed public distrust of the Gang of Four and their control over propaganda. Similar slogans soon appeared in other cities and on trains bound for Beijing, indicating that public mourning was rapidly transforming into widespread political protest.

On April 4, the day of the Qingming Festival, large crowds of Beijing residents gathered spontaneously in Tiananmen Square to lay wreaths, read poems, and deliver speeches in memory of Zhou Enlai. While these actions were framed as mourning, many of them also included implicit criticism of the Gang of Four and support for Deng Xiaoping. That evening, the Political Bureau of the CCP Central Committee convened and characterized the gathering as a counter-revolutionary incident, accusing Deng of being behind the movement. With Mao's approval, a decision was made to forcibly clear the square.

In the early hours of April 5, clashes broke out between citizens and security forces in Tiananmen Square in what became known as the April 5th Movement (Tiananmen Incident). The event marked a peak in mass political dissent during the late Cultural Revolution and became a turning point in the internal power struggles of the Chinese Communist Party. Shortly afterward, Deng Xiaoping was stripped of all official positions once again.

== See also ==
- Death of Mao Zedong
- Death of Deng Xiaoping
- Death of Jiang Zemin
- Death of Hu Yaobang
- Death of Li Keqiang
- Death of Chiang Kai-shek
- Lee Kuan Yew's Death
