= Death and state funeral of Deng Xiaoping =

1997 events in China

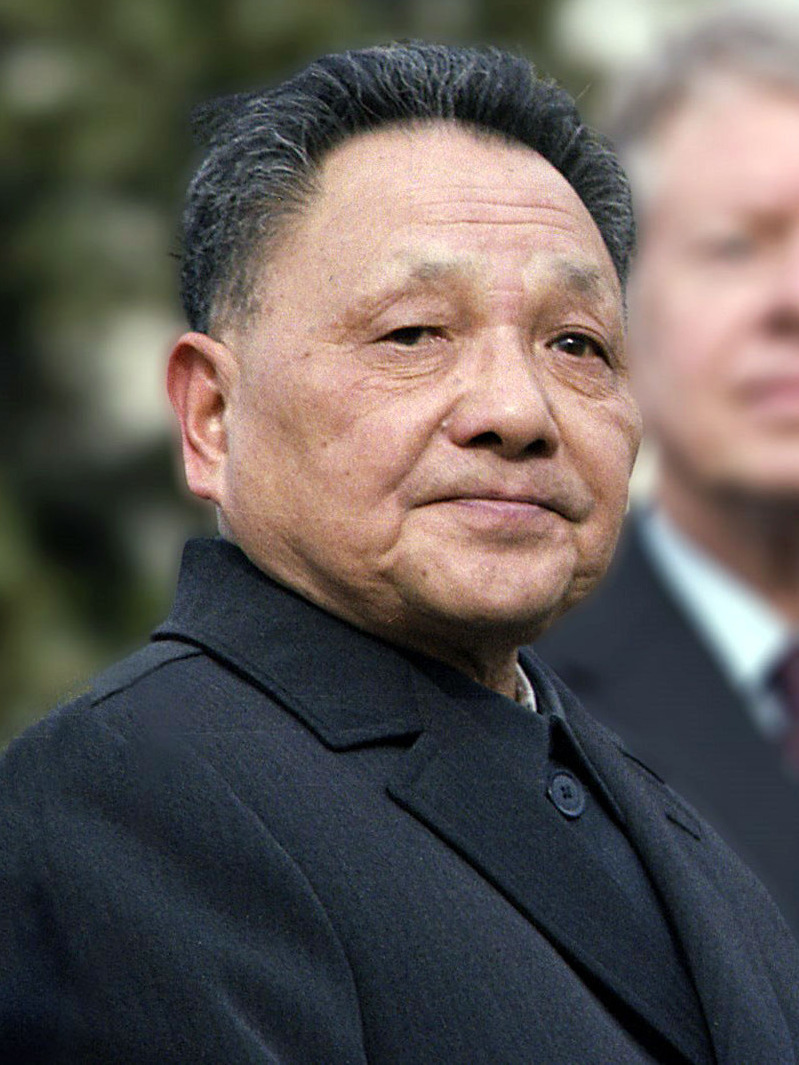
- Deng Xiaoping (1904 – 1997)
- Date: 19 February 1997, at 21:08 (BJT); (death); 24 February 1997; (cremation); 25 February 1997; (state funeral)
- Location: Beijing
- Participants: Jiang Zemin, party and state leaders, members of the Chinese Communist Party, Chinese military and civilians

External videos
- Official Announcement on state broadcaster CCTV

Deng Xiaoping, the Chairman of the Central Military Commission of the Chinese Communist Party (CCP) from 1981 to 1989, as well as the paramount leader of the People's Republic of China from 1978 to 1989, died on 19 February 1997, at the age of 92, in Beijing. According to Xinhua News Agency, he died at 21:08 local time, from late stage Parkinson's disease complicated by pulmonary infection. Following a private funeral at 301 Hospital and cremation at Babaoshan Revolutionary Cemetery, a state funeral for Deng was held at the Great Hall of the People on 25 February 1997. It was the first major state funeral held in China since 1976 when Mao Zedong died.

== Death and national mourning ==
According to the Chinese state media Xinhua News Agency, Deng died in Beijing at 9:08 pm from complications from Parkinson's disease and a lung infection. Xinhua published a "Letter to the whole Party, the Army, and the People of all ethnic groups in the Country" (告全党全军全国各族人民书) on 2 am, used to announce the deaths of national leaders in China.

During the announcement, the official portrait of Deng Xiaoping during his leadership was shown in grayscale and coverage of funeral proceedings were accompanied by the playing of the dirge (哀乐), an instrumental piece that has been played to mark the death of every CCP leader since Mao Zedong and later, Jiang Zemin.

== Funeral procession ==
On 19 February, the Funeral Committee of Deng Xiaoping was announced. General Secretary of the Chinese Communist Party Jiang Zemin was announced as its chairman, with many other current or former high-ranking officials from the CCP as members. On the day of Deng's death, the CCP released a notice that the national flags would be flown half-staff in key locations of Beijing and diplomatic missions abroad. Foreign heads of state and government were not invited to attend official mourning activities.

On 24 February, Jiang, members of the CCP Politburo Standing Committee, other CCP and state leaders and President Yang Shangkun, as well as former leader bid farewell to Deng's body at the 301 Hospital, where they conferred their condolences to Deng's relatives. Afterwards, they accompanied the hearse carrying Deng's remains to the Babaoshan Revolutionary Cemetery, where they gave their final farewells. Many people paid their respects. The body was cremated at the cemetery, with his ashes designated to be scattered at sea.

On 24 February, the memorial service for Deng was held at the Great Hall of the People. The memorial began at 10 am, and was presided by Premier Li Peng. Afterwards, Jiang Zemin gave a eulogy. After Jiang's eulogy, the Internationale was played, with the ceremony concluding afterwards.

On 2 March, after the conclusion of the memorial services, Deng's ashes were carried onto a special plane, his ashes were slowly scattered along with colorful flower petals, and according to his will, his corneas were also donated.

== See also ==
- Death and state funeral of Mao Zedong
- Death and state funeral of Jiang Zemin
