= Hans Müller (physician) =

Chinese physician (1915–1994)

- Born: 13 January 1915; Zietenstr. 11, Düsseldorf-Golzheim, Germany
- Died: 4 December 1994 (aged 79); Beijing, China
- Resting place: Babaoshan Revolutionary Cemetery, Beijing, China
- Occupation: Medical Doctor
- Known for: German-born Jewish doctor who was a medical doctor in China since 1939; Research effort into hepatitis B and development of a vaccine Vice President of Beijing Medical University
- Spouse: Kyoko Nakamura
- Parents: Simon Fred Müller (died 1952) (father); Henriette Müller (died 1949) (mother)

Dr. Hans Müller (13 January 1915 – 4 December 1994, Chinese: 汉斯·米勒; pinyin: Hànsī Mǐlè) was a Chinese physician of German-Jewish descent who immigrated to China and made contributions to improving health care in China over several decades. Müller contributed in the research effort into hepatitis B and development of a vaccine, in addition, he became the Vice President of Beijing Medical University in China. Müller was also elected a member of the Chinese People's Political Consultative Conference.

== Early life ==
Hans Müller was born in Düsseldorf-Golzheim, Germany as the only child of Henriette Müller née Ballin (a niece of the shipping magnate Albert Ballin, died 1949) and Simon Fred Müller (died 1952). His father owned an electrical goods factory in Düsseldorf. Because he was Jewish, Simon Fred Müller was held captive in the Theresienstadt concentration camp from 1942 to 1945.

Because it was difficult for a Jewish student to go to a German university at the time, Müller went to Switzerland to do so. Hans Müller went to study medicine at the University of Basel. At the University of Basel, he met a Chinese student named Chiang Zhaoxian, who told Müller about China, its culture, history and ongoing events.

== Career ==
Hans Müller left Switzerland in April 1939 after receiving his doctorate and traveled to Hong Kong via Marseille. During June and July of the same year, he made his way to Yan'an via Nanning, Guiyang, Chongqing, Chengdu, Baoji, and Xi'an.

In Yan'an, he met with Mao Zedong and worked in the emergency room of the International Peace Hospital. He held medical posts in the Eighth Route Army and the People's Liberation Army, training many doctors. After the war, he held a position in the Changchun Hospital. The further stages of his career were an appointment as Professor at the Shenyang Medical College, where he later served Dean and head of pediatrics, an appointment as Professor of Internal Medicine at Beijing's Jishuitan Hospital, and finally vice president of Beijing Medical University. He conducted research in the areas of pediatric medicine and hepatitis B.

== Honors and awards ==
- 1989: Outstanding International Medical Worker (Presented by the PRC Ministry of Health)

== Personal ==
Müller was married in 1949 to Kyoko Nakamura (中村京子) a Japanese nurse with whom he had a daughter (Mimi Müller, 米米, born 1950) and a son (Dehua Muller, born 1953). He became a Chinese citizen in 1950.

In 1994, Müller died in China after a long history of heart disease. Müller is buried at the Babaoshan Revolutionary Cemetery in Beijing.

=== Legacy ===
His personal artifacts have been donated to the Anti-Japanese War Museum in Beijing, China.
