= Death and state funeral of Mao Zedong =

1976 event in Beijing, China

Death and funeral of Mao Zedong
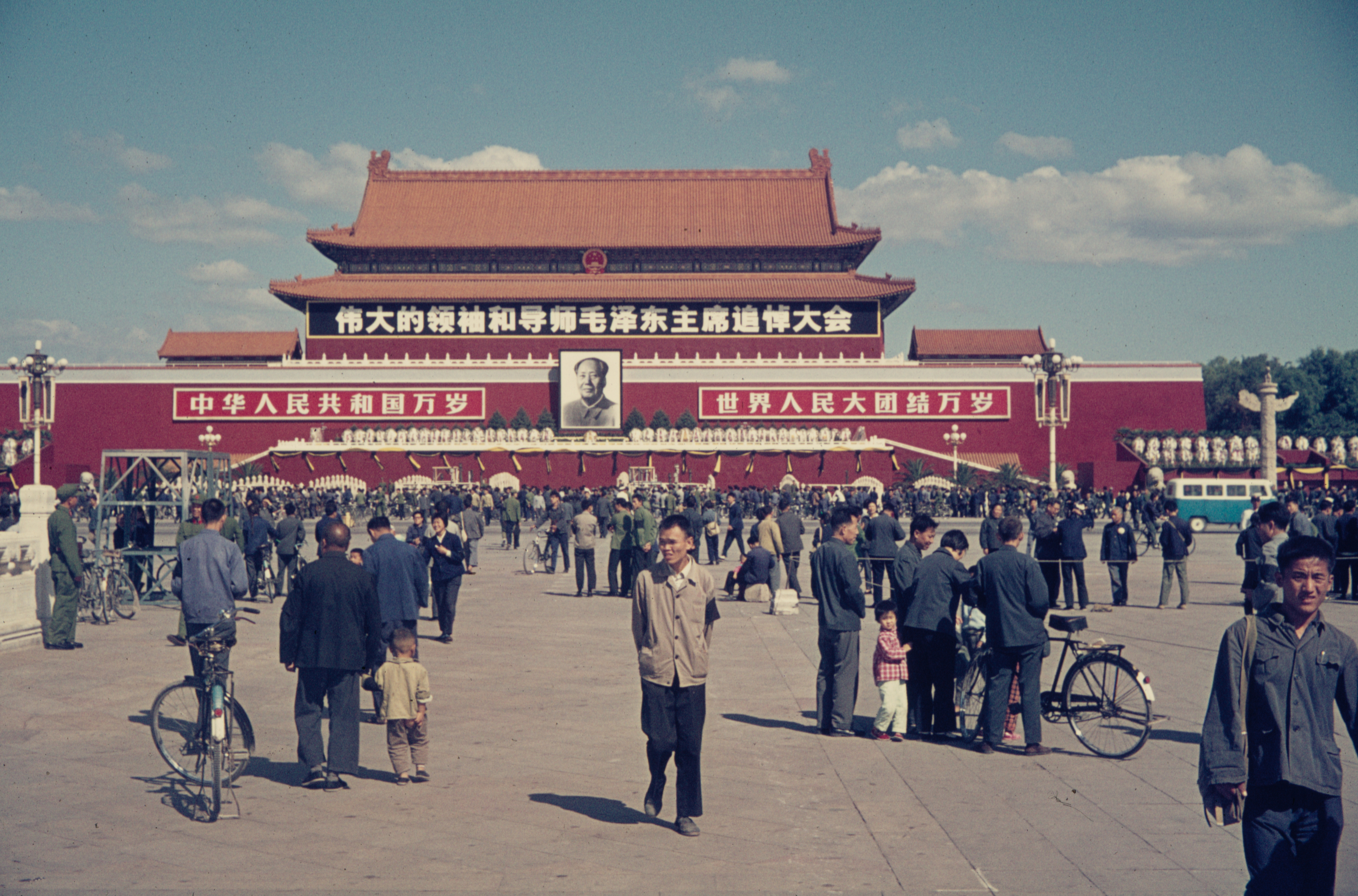
- Tiananmen Square a few days after Mao's death in September 1976. The Tiananmen is decorated with a black-and-white portrait of Mao and a banner announcing a "memorial meeting for the Great Leader and Teacher, Chairman Mao Zedong".
- Date: 9–18 September 1976
- Location: Beijing, China
- Participants: Hua Guofeng, party and state leaders, members of the Chinese Communist Party, Chinese military and civilians

Mao Zedong, the founder of the People's Republic of China (PRC) and Chairman of the Chinese Communist Party, died on 9 September 1976 at the age of 82, following a period of ill health. The government ordered a week of national mourning following his death.

== Death ==
The party knew that Mao was unwell since at least May, with him suffering a heart attack on 11 May 1976, and his health gradually declining over the next few months. By June, planning for the construction of his memorial hall began, and a notification was issued to senior party officials across China stating that Mao was "seriously ill." Mao's last public appearance – and the last known photograph of him alive – was on 27 May 1976. Frail and barely able to speak or walk, Mao met the visiting Pakistani Prime Minister Zulfikar Ali Bhutto during the latter's visit to Beijing. At around 17:00 on 2 September 1976, Mao had a heart attack, far more severe than his previous two earlier that year which affected a much larger area of his heart, leaving him bedridden. On the afternoon of 7 September, Mao's condition deteriorated severely; he experienced rapid multiple organ failure, fell into a coma shortly before noon, and was put on a ventilator and life support machines.

On 8 September, when it was clear the comatose Mao was beyond recovery, Chinese government officials decided to disconnect his life support machines at midnight. Mao died ten minutes later at 00:10 local time on 9 September 1976 at age 82. When Mao died, many top CCP officials were noted to be very emotional, with Hua Guofeng being "rendered inarticulate." A general sense of panic was the most prevalent reaction. Wang Dongxing took charge of the situation and made arrangements to notify the Politburo of Mao's death, instructing them to schedule a meeting on what to do next. The Chinese Communist Party (CCP) delayed the announcement of his death until 16:00 later that day, when a radio message broadcast across the nation announced the news of Mao's death while appealing for party unity.

The Chinese government ordered a week of national mourning with flags at half-staff. All entertainment and music activities were suspended and theaters were closed.

== Funeral and memorial service ==
External videos
- Official Chinese documentary on Mao's funeral

Mao's embalmed, CCP-flag-draped body lay in state at the Great Hall of the People for one week. During this period, an estimated one million people, including diplomatic envoys, leaders of foreign communist parties, and foreign nationals in China, filed past Mao to pay their final respects. Chairman Mao's official portrait was hung on the wall, with a banner reading: "Carry on the cause left by Chairman Mao and carry on the cause of proletarian revolution to the end", until September 17.

On September 17, Chairman Mao's body was taken in a minibus from the Great Hall of the people to Maojiawan to the 305 Hospital that Li Zhisui directed, and Mao's internal organs were preserved in formaldehyde. Mao had signed a pledge to be cremated, consistent with the principles of the Communist Party. The historical consensus is that there are not reliable records demonstrating how Party leadership reached the decision to preserve his body.

The preserved body is displayed in Chairman Mao Memorial Hall.

== Public opinion and ceremonies ==
Following the death of Mao Zedong and his state funeral, a mourning period was to be held, with September 18 officially designated as a National Day of Mourning. There would be mourning services held at the Great Hall from September 11 to September 17, with September 18 hosting a mass ceremony at Tiananmen which would be broadcast to all of China.

Public opinion in the immediate aftermath was divided. Many older Chinese citizens, who would have held memories of a China before Maoist rule, believed that things would begin to improve once Mao had died. For some, there was little to no reaction, with many villages, factories, and military facilities containing no mourning peasants. For others, it was a catastrophe. Many citizens had a firm belief that Mao was selfless, that he spent his entire life thinking of nothing but the people.

== Politics of commemorating Chairman Mao ==
Upon the death of Mao, political maneuvering intensified. The ideological aspect that past leadership conflicts had throughout history, such as the anti-Deng Xiaoping narrative, the previous ten years of bitterness, and individual animosities within the current Politburo – all of them stoked fears of the upcoming maneuvering escalating beyond control. Political maneuvering over Mao's death was first apparent in the establishment of a funeral committee that consisted of 377 members, representing the central Party and state, as well as the military and provincial organizations of the regime. For individuals being appointed to the committee represented a recognition of their personal loyalty to Mao, as well as validation over their life's work to furthering the CCP's cause. Certain members were deliberately excluded from being included in the committee due to politics.

Prominent targets included those that were a suffering as a result of the anti-Deng movement, with Hu Qiaomu, Zhang Aiping, Wan Li, Hu Yaobang, Deng Liqun, Yu Guangyuan, and Mao's niece, Wang Hairong, all being excluded from the committee. Certain members, such as Deng Liqun, Yu Guangyuan, and Hu Qiaomu, were not allowed to pay their respects to Mao's body, instead having to stand with the crowds in Tiananmen in order to mourn Mao.

For the committee, the most important task was how to represent Mao and his career now that he was dead. Of which, the representation would also include how to present the surviving leadership's ideological line going forward. This was established through two documents: a message given to the nation on September 9, and Hua Guofeng's memorial speech at Tiananmen on September 18. Both documents had similar messages, with a focus on consolidating the themes of the Cultural Revolution, party unity, as well as continuing the criticism and struggle against Deng.

For Mao specifically, the documents covered his entire career and portrayed him as “the greatest Marxist of the contemporary era.” The documents spanned his career from the 1920s and the struggles against Chen Duxiu, to the more recent anti-Deng movement which was described as a “victory over the ‘counterrevolutionary revisionist’ Deng.” Mao’s different approaches and leading styles throughout the Party’s history were also included, with the September 9 message including Mao’s emphasis in the 1960s on “the three great revolutionary movements of class struggle, the struggle for production and scientific experiment.” Attention was also paid to Mao's role in international politics, to his leadership and struggles against modern revisionism amongst the shadow of the Cold War and two global hegemons. Furthermore, Mao was also praised for his role in devising military theories and army building.

There were little incidents among the committee on portraying Mao in this manner, with any kind of division between Hua or the Gang of Four, or in the party as a whole between radicals and establishment beneficiaries, being put mostly to the side. There were minor incidents however, with one account detailing an encounter involving Jiang Qing, where she was critical of the drafts for not mentioning the campaign against Lin Biao and Confucius or the criticism of Deng, of which the final documents did contain, but also claimed that efforts were made to reverse the verdict on the Cultural Revolution. Another issue came from the inclusion of the “three do’s and three don’ts,” which held negative implications against the Gang of Four and was an injunction aimed at them. There was little pushback from the radicals however, and despite some protests over the length of the speech, the key consideration was that these words came from Mao, and as such were beyond challenge.

Other incidents involved the discourses that happened over the issue of what arrangements should be made for Mao's corpse. With an account from Wu De asserting that the Gang of Four avoided involvement in the issue, instead allowing Wang Dongxing organized experts to study how best to preserve the body. While Wu also asserts that there was a sinister intent behind the actions of the Gang of Four and the radicals, that they would attack Hua if the body were not preserved; the issue ultimately did not result in any kind of sharp clash.

Following the ascension of Deng Xiaoping as the paramount leader of China in 1978, the idea of commemorating Mao as a great leader had to be further tempered and challenged with acknowledging the past. The Cultural Revolution and the past rebellions, ones sanctioned and encouraged by Mao, resulted in a devastating and permanent erosion of the political authority of the CCP. The efforts to both commemorate Mao and distance the CCP from his actions involved separating Mao Zedong and Mao Zedong Thought, where Mao's actions in initiating the Cultural Revolution were viewed as “inconsistent” with Mao Zedong Thought.

== Reactions ==
Countries that flew their flag half mast after Mao's death

Heads of state or government from 123 countries sent a total of 169 telegrams and letters of condolence to the People's Republic of China; leaders and their representatives or government representatives from 105 countries visited the embassies and consulates of the People's Republic of China in their respective countries to offer their condolences. Besides the People's Republic of China, a total of 55 countries flew their flags at half-mast in mourning for Mao Zedong's death:

- Afghanistan
- Albania
- Argentina
- Bangladesh
- Benin
- Botswana
- Canada
- Chad
- Chile
- Congo
- Cyprus
- Egypt
- Equatorial Guinea
- Ethiopia
- France
- Gabon
- The Gambia
- Ghana
- Guinea
- Guinea-Bissau
- Guyana
- India
- Kampuchea
- Kenya
- Kuwait
- Laos
- Madagascar
- Maldives
- Mali
- Mozambique
- Nepal
- New Zealand
- Nigeria
- North Korea
- North Yemen
- Pakistan
- Panama
- Romania
- Sierra Leone
- Somalia
- Sri Lanka
- Sudan
- Switzerland
- Syria
- Tanzania
- Tunisia
- Turkey
- Uganda
- Venezuela
- Vietnam
- West Germany
- Yugoslavia
- Zaire
- Zambia

=== Countries ===
- Albania – The Party of Labour of Albania stated that "As a great Marxist-Leninist, Comrade Mao Zedong waged a resolute struggle against the enemies of Marxism-Leninism headed by the Khrushchev revisionists, and made great contributions to the international communist movement and the workers' movement. The Communists and people of Albania will forever remember their dearest and most honored friend, Comrade Mao Zedong, the architect of the fraternal revolutionary friendship and unbreakable unity between our two parties, our two peoples and our two countries." On the morning of 10 September, leaders Enver Hoxha, Haxhi Lleshi and Mehmet Shehu went to the Chinese Embassy in Albania to pay their respects. The Albanian Government declared the period from 16 to 18 September as days of national mourning, during which flags would be flown at half-mast and there would be no recreational or sports activities. A memorial service for Mao Zedong was held on 17 September.
- Australia – Governor-General Sir John Kerr said "I know that every member of the Chinese nation today is like a family who lost one of the most respected parents," Prime Minister Malcolm Fraser said "With his guidance and encouragement, China has regained its national dignity and international prestige."
- Benin - Patrice Houngavou, Benin representative to the United Nations, offered his and his delegation's most profound condolences to the Chinese party, government, and people. Houngavou then conveyed that the Benin party, government, and people feel great sorrow over the death of Mao, and share in the grief felt by the Chinese people; expressing that Mao's vision was “very accurate.”
- Canada - Upon the death of Mao, Canadian Prime Minister Pierre Trudeau expressed “profound personal regret at the death of ‘a giant of the 20th-century world history and the father of new China.’” Trudeau noted his satisfaction over the diplomatic relationship that had been established between China and Canada, which had first begun six years prior to Mao’s death.
- PR Congo – The highest supreme body met on September 10 when a five-point decision was made laid the national mourning after the death of Mao. September 13 was declared a day of national mourning.
- France – President Valéry Giscard d'Estaing said that Mao "freed China from the humiliation of the past and restored China's central position given to her by history. France will not forget that it was Chairman Mao Zedong and General De Gaulle who deeply admired him that led to the mutual development of our two countries."
- Guyana - Following Mao's death, Prime Minister Forbes Burnham sent a message to the Premier of the State Council of the People's Republic of China expressing his, his party's, his government's, and his people's mourning over Mao's death. Burnham vows to not let his teachings die, and accredits Mao with being one of the few people to play a decisive role in the “long struggle for liberation.”
- India – Prime Minister Indira Gandhi said, "The Government and people of India join me in sending you our sincere condolences on the death of Chairman Mao Tse-tung. He was an eminent statesman who led the resurgence and progress of the Chinese people."
- Italy - On September 9, 1976, the President of the Italian Republic, the President of the Senate, and the President of the Council of Ministers of Italy all sent messages of condolence to the Chinese government over the death of Mao. Italian representative to the United Nations, Mr. Cavaglieri, further put forward feelings of solidarity over the grief and sorrow felt by the Chinese people.
- Japan – Prime Minister Takeo Miki and others went to the Chinese Embassy to personally mourn and issued a statement saying that "Now, when Japan-China relations are developing, they have lost this great leader and sincerely feel sorry". He reiterated Beijing's support for Japan's claim to recover the four northern islands occupied by the Soviet Union.
- Kampuchea – The government of Democratic Kampuchea decided on national mourning from September 12 to 18.
- DPR Korea – General Secretary Kim Il Sung sent a telegram of condolence to the Chinese Communist Party which said, "During the liberation of the motherland and the fierce struggle of the Korean people against the US imperialist armed aggressors, Comrade Mao Zedong smashed all obstacles of the domestic and foreign enemies, set off a campaign against the United States and aided the DPRK, and used blood to aid the just struggle of our people." The North Korean government also designated September 10–18 as a national mourning period, with a half-flag mourning and a large-scale mourning event. Kim Il Sung personally went to the Chinese Embassy in North Korea to offer condolences on 11 September. The Chinese Embassy in North Korea received more than 10,000 people to offer condolences and received more than 5,200 telegrams of condolence.
- Maldives – President Ibrahim Nasir sent a message of condolence to the Chinese Communist Party, offering sympathies to him and the people of China on Mao Zedong's death. He announced three days of national mourning with flags half-masted.
- Panama - The Chief of State of Panama, General Omar Torrijos Herrera, sent a telegram to the Government of China following Mao's death: “I express to the Government and people of the People’s Republic of China our feelings of solidarity in this hour of mourning, not only for the Chinese people but for all peoples striving for liberation, on the irreparable loss of that great leader of the masses Chairman Mao Tse-tung. I had always had a profound desire to have the honour of meeting the architect of modern China, who ended famine for the Chinese people and gave them dignity. In Mao Tse-tung China gave mankind one of its greatest men, whose legacy will never perish.”
- Pakistan – On September 9, President Fazal Ilahi Chaudhry issued a statement: "As the father of the Chinese revolution that has changed the lives of a quarter of the human race, Chairman Mao is one of the most outstanding leaders of all time. As a politician and thinker, he has left an indelible mark on the annals of mankind. His death is not only a huge loss to the Chinese people, but also to the people of all countries in the world." Pakistani Prime Minister Bhutto said, "Chairman Mao Zedong has always been concerned about the happiness and progress of Pakistan. This makes him live forever in our hearts. The Pakistani people mourn the death of this great man together with the brotherly Chinese people." Pakistani government has ordered seven days of mourning with flags half mast.
- Romania – General Secretary and President Nicolae Ceaușescu said in a telegram, "Mao Zedong was a close friend of the Romanian people. He has worked hard to develop the relationship between our two parties, the two countries and the two peoples, to benefit the people of both countries and to the cause of socialism and peace." Romanian government declared September 18 a day of national mourning.
- Sierra Leone – The Sierra Leone government declared nine days of national mourning.
- Singapore - The most-widely circulated newspaper in Singapore, The Straits Times, focused on the leadership gap left by Mao's death, noting how it “raises deep uncertainties about the future of China and its relations with the rest of the world.” With another Singapore newspaper commenting on how diplomats felt a deep sense of tension upon learning of Mao's death, with the lack of heir left by Mao being cited as a primary reason behind the political tension, as well as a potential cause for disorder.
- Soviet Union – Due to the strained Sino-Soviet relations, the Soviet Union only briefly mentioned the death of Mao Zedong in the corner of the official newspaper, and criticized Maoism on TASS. The Soviet Union and its seven satellite states (including Poland, East Germany, Hungary, Bulgaria, Czechoslovakia, Cuba and Mongolia) issued a collective telegram of condolence in the name of the party. The Communist Party of the Soviet Union telegram stated "Central Committee of the Communist Party of China: Please accept our deepest condolences on the passing of Mao Zedong, Chairman of the Central Committee of the Communist Party of China. We also extend our sympathies to the families and relatives of the deceased. The Central Committee of the Communist Party of the Soviet Union." However, due to the Sino-Soviet split, the CCP's relations with some communist parties, including the CPSU, were severed, and these condolence messages were rejected by the Ministry of Foreign Affairs of China. Kirill Mazurov, First Deputy Chairman of the Council of Ministers, and Andrei Gromyko, the Minister of Foreign Affairs, went to the Chinese Embassy in the Soviet Union to express their condolences on behalf of the Soviet government.
- Sri Lanka – Sri Lankan government declared nine days of national mourning with the flags half-masted.
- Sweden - Olof Rydbeck, Swedish representative to the United Nations, offered the deepest condolences and sympathies to the Chinese delegation. Rydbeck then read aloud a statement made by the Prime Minister of Sweden, Olof Palme, on behalf of the Swedish people and government to the council: “With the death of Chairman Mao Tse-tung, one of the great leaders in world history has passed away. His name and his life’s work will for ever be linked to the liberation struggle of the Chinese people. Under his leadership China has risen from the deep degradation of colonialism and feudalism. The impact of Mao Tse-tung’s work is not confined to China only. His thoughts regarding the power of the human will to reshape the conditions of our existence have profoundly influenced peoples all over the world.”
- Taiwan – The National Assembly of the Republic of China issued a statement on September 10 encouraging anti-communist rebels in the PRC to take advantage of the CCP's internal power struggles. Li Yuzhen, chairman of the Republic of China Sports Association, and forty-five individual sports associations encouraged mainland athletes to use international competitions to defect.
- Thailand - Thai Foreign Minister, Puchai Rattakul, and numerous other Thai dignitaries offered their personal respects at the Chinese embassy over the death of Mao. The deep sense of respect given by the visiting Thais was noted as a direct representation of the improved relations between Thailand and China; relations that were furthered as an effort to counter Soviet influence.
- United Kingdom – Queen Elizabeth II and Prime Minister James Callaghan said "[Mao’s] influence far exceeds China's borders, and he will undoubtedly be remembered as a world-famous great politician."
- United Republic of Tanzania – Tanzanian President Julius Nyerere declared nine days of national mourning. He furthermore conveyed the deep grief and sense of loss felt by his government and people over the death of Chairman Mao.
- The United Nations - On September 10, 1976, The United Nations Security Council opened with a tribute dedicated to the memory of Chairman Mao Tse-tung. The President, Mansur Rashid Kikhia, conveyed the deepest condolences on behalf of the council towards the Chinese ambassador, Huang Hua, over the death of Mao. Kikhia then asked for such condolences to be transmitted by the ambassador to, his government, party, and people. With Kikhia noting how Mao was beloved and revered by the Chinese people for his courage, determination, and role in restoring the unity of China and its status among other nations. Furthermore, he stated that “[Mao] came to embody something of the aspirations of all mankind.” The Council then observed a minute of silence in tribute to the memory of Chairman Mao.
- United States – President Gerald Ford first sent a message to Beijing which said "When I visited Beijing in December 1975, I had the privilege of meeting Chairman Mao. Our conversation has promoted the development of US-China relations along the lines envisioned by our two countries. Please let me declare now as I did then, that the United States is determined to complete the normalization of our relationship on the basis of the Shanghai Communiqué. This will be an appropriate channel to praise his vision and will benefit the people of both countries." In addition, he made the following remarks: "The People's Republic of China, announced today the passing away of Chairman Mao Tse-Tung. Chairman Mao was a giant figure in modern Chinese History. He was a leader whose actions profoundly affected the development of his country. His influence on history will extend far beyond the borders of China. Americans will remember that it was under Chairman Mao that China moved together with the United States to end a generation of hostility and to launch a new and more positive era in relations between our two countries. I am confident that the trend of improved relations between the People's Republic of China and the United States, which Chairman Mao helped create, will continue to contribute to world peace and stability. On behalf of the United States government and the American peoples, I offer condolences to the government and people of the People's Republic of China."
- Venezuela – Venezuelan President Carlos Andrés Pérez announced three days of national mourning with flags half-masted.
- Vietnam – The Workers' of Vietnam issued a statement saying "The Vietnamese people will always remember the respectful speech that Chairman Mao said that "the 700 million Chinese people have the strong backing of the Vietnamese people and the vast Chinese territory is the reliable rear of the Vietnamese people." We Vietnamese people are extremely grateful to Mao Zedong. The chairman, the Chinese Communist Party, the Chinese government and the fraternal Chinese people have given us tremendous and valuable support and assistance to the revolutionary cause." On 10 and 11 September, Vietnamese party and government leaders such as Tôn Đức Thắng, Lê Duẩn, Trường Chinh, Phạm Văn Đồng, and Võ Nguyên Giáp visited the Chinese Embassy in Vietnam to pay their respects. On 18 September, according to the decision of the Vietnamese government meeting, all Vietnamese agencies, military units, factories, mines, enterprises (including construction sites), schools, and Vietnamese ships docked in Vietnamese ports flew their flags at half-mast in mourning.
- West Germany – In his condolence message, President Walter Scheel stated that "Mao Zedong played a decisive role in shaping the history of this century". Chancellor Helmut Schmidt stated that "Chairman Mao Zedong was one of the creators of the development of world history and the one who pointed out the path to a new future for the Chinese people. He will be remembered forever by the people of your country and the world. My conversation with the late man last year left me with an indelible impression of this great man. I believe that the Chinese people and their leaders will follow his spirit and work together with the people of other countries in the world to continue to strive for peace and human progress." Foreign Minister and Free Democratic Party Leader Hans-Dietrich Genscher, Bundestag President Annemarie Renger, Social Democratic Party Leader and former Chancellor Willy Brandt, and other leaders of major political parties went to the Chinese Embassy in West Germany to pay their respects. According to contemporaneous "People's Daily" reporting, federal buildings in West Germany flew their flags at half-mast on 18 September, the day of the state funeral.
- Yugoslavia – President Josip Broz Tito commented: "The death of Chairman Mao Zedong has caused the Chinese people to lose their most outstanding leader. Without him, modern China would be unimaginable."

== See also ==
- Death and state funeral of Deng Xiaoping
- Death and state funeral of Jiang Zemin
