= Death and state funeral of Jiang Zemin =

2022 events in China

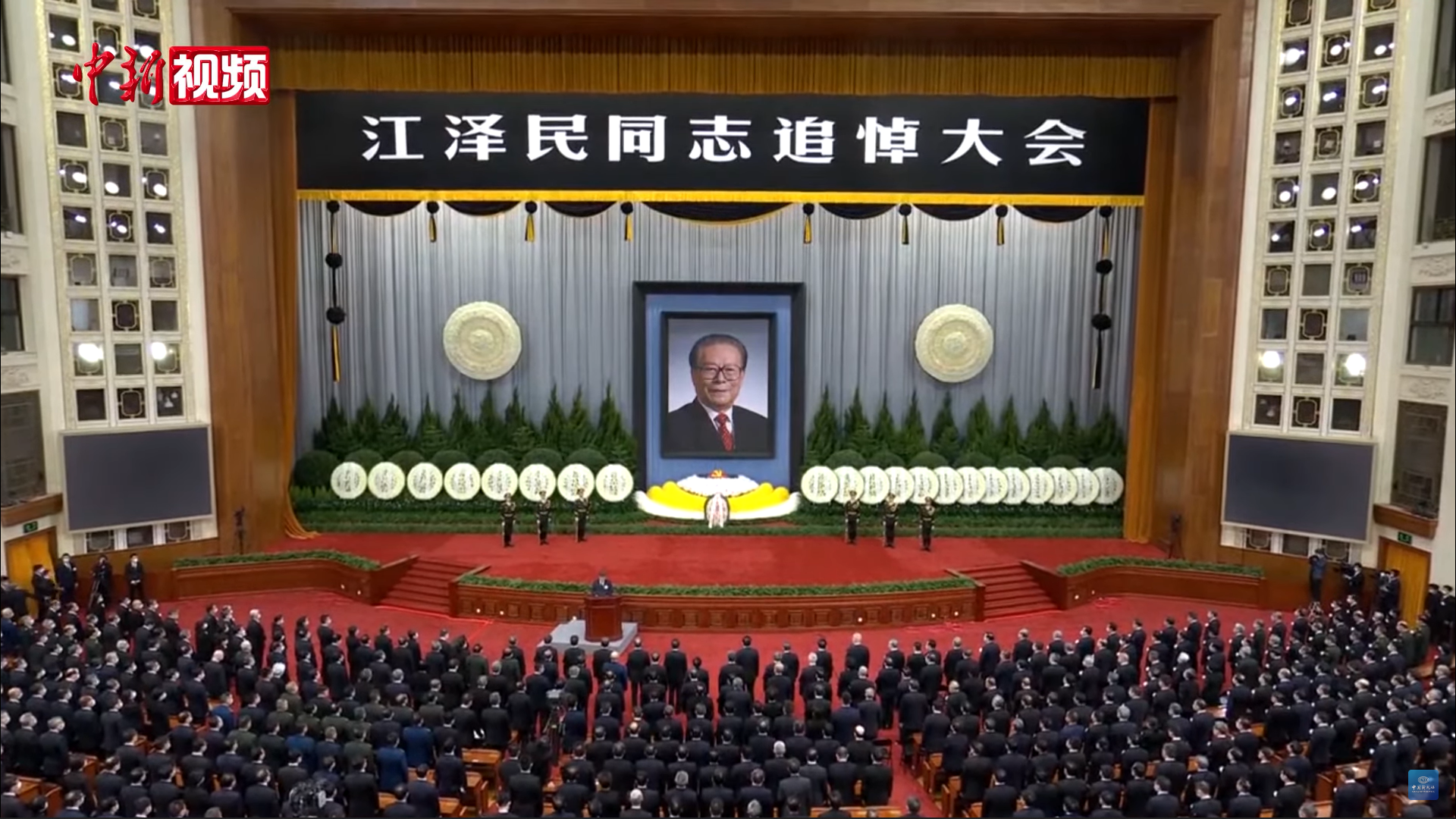
- Memorial Service for Jiang Zemin at the Great Hall of the People
- Date: 30 November 2022, at 12:13 (BJT); (death); 5 December 2022; (cremation); 6 December 2022; (state funeral)
- Location: Shanghai and Beijing
- Participants: Xi Jinping, party and state leaders, members of the Chinese Communist Party, Chinese military and civilians

Jiang Zemin, (Note: Also historically rendered as "Chiang Tze-min". In this Chinese name, the family name is Jiang.) the general secretary of the Chinese Communist Party (CCP) from 1989 to 2002, and the president of the People's Republic of China from 1993 to 2003, died on 30 November 2022, at the age of 96, in Shanghai. According to Xinhua News Agency, he died at 12:13 local time, from leukemia and multiple organ failures. Following a private funeral at PLA General Hospital and cremation at Babaoshan Revolutionary Cemetery, a state funeral for Jiang was held at the Great Hall of the People the next day on 6 December 2022. It was the first major state funeral held in China since 1997 when Deng Xiaoping died and the first funeral for a Chinese president since 1998 when former president Yang Shangkun died.

== Death and national mourning ==
According to the Chinese state media Xinhua News Agency, Jiang died in Shanghai at 12:13 pm from leukemia and multiple organ failures. Xinhua published a "Letter to the whole Party, the Army, and the People of all ethnic groups in the Country" (告全党全军全国各族人民书) on 16:34, used to announce the deaths of national leaders in China.

External videos
- Official Announcement on state broadcaster CCTV

After the letter was read and issued on state media, all channels promptly turned their television channel logos into black and white. During the announcement, the official portrait of Jiang Zemin during his leadership was shown in grayscale and coverage of funeral proceedings were accompanied by the playing of the dirge (哀乐), an instrumental piece that has been played to mark the death of every Communist Party leader since Mao Zedong and Deng Xiaoping.

Anchors from China Central Television (CCTV), China Global Television Network (CGTN) and all local television channels wore all black, or plain color clothing when reporting news. Meanwhile, interface of all media websites such as People's Daily, Guangming Daily, People's Liberation Army Daily, Chinese Central Television, China Global Television Network, China National Radio and China Radio International turned to grayscale to commemorate the passing of Jiang Zemin. Official print such as the People's Daily, Guangming Daily, and PLA Daily published the news of Jiang Zemin's death in the same form on 1 December 2022, with a large portrait of Jiang included. During the mourning period, all variety shows and entertaining dramas were suspended. While television programs are mostly shifted to CCP-related TV drama series and documentaries, Guangdong Television replaced most of its drama series programs with historical or public interest programs. Mainland China entered into a restriction of entertaining activities, while all social media went into a state of "black and white on the homepage, suspension of entertainment, and suspension of advertising".

As the mourning period coincided with the 2022 FIFA World Cup, CCTV continued broadcasting competitions on CCTV-5, and it would still be livestreamed on Migu. Immediately after Jiang's death announcements, coverage briefly turned to black and white but later returned to broadcast in color. Online shopping platforms like Taobao, JD.com, Pinduoduo, social media platforms like Weibo, Bilibili and Xiaohongshu were turned to black and white interfaces and the "Like" buttons on all Weibo posts related to Jiang Zemin's death were changed to chrysanthemum (a traditional Chinese mourning flower) logo. Originally scheduled to be held on 1 and 2 December 2022, tech giants Xiaomi, Huawei and Vivo announced to postpone their new product launches to mourn Jiang Zemin. After the announcement of the death of Jiang Zemin through CCTV, thousands of Chinese citizens mourned Jiang and offered flowers at his former residence in Yangzhou, Jiangsu Province. The CBA announced its intention to postpone competitions scheduled on 6 December 2022, to be held on 7 December 2022 and 19 January 2023 respectively.

== Funeral procession ==
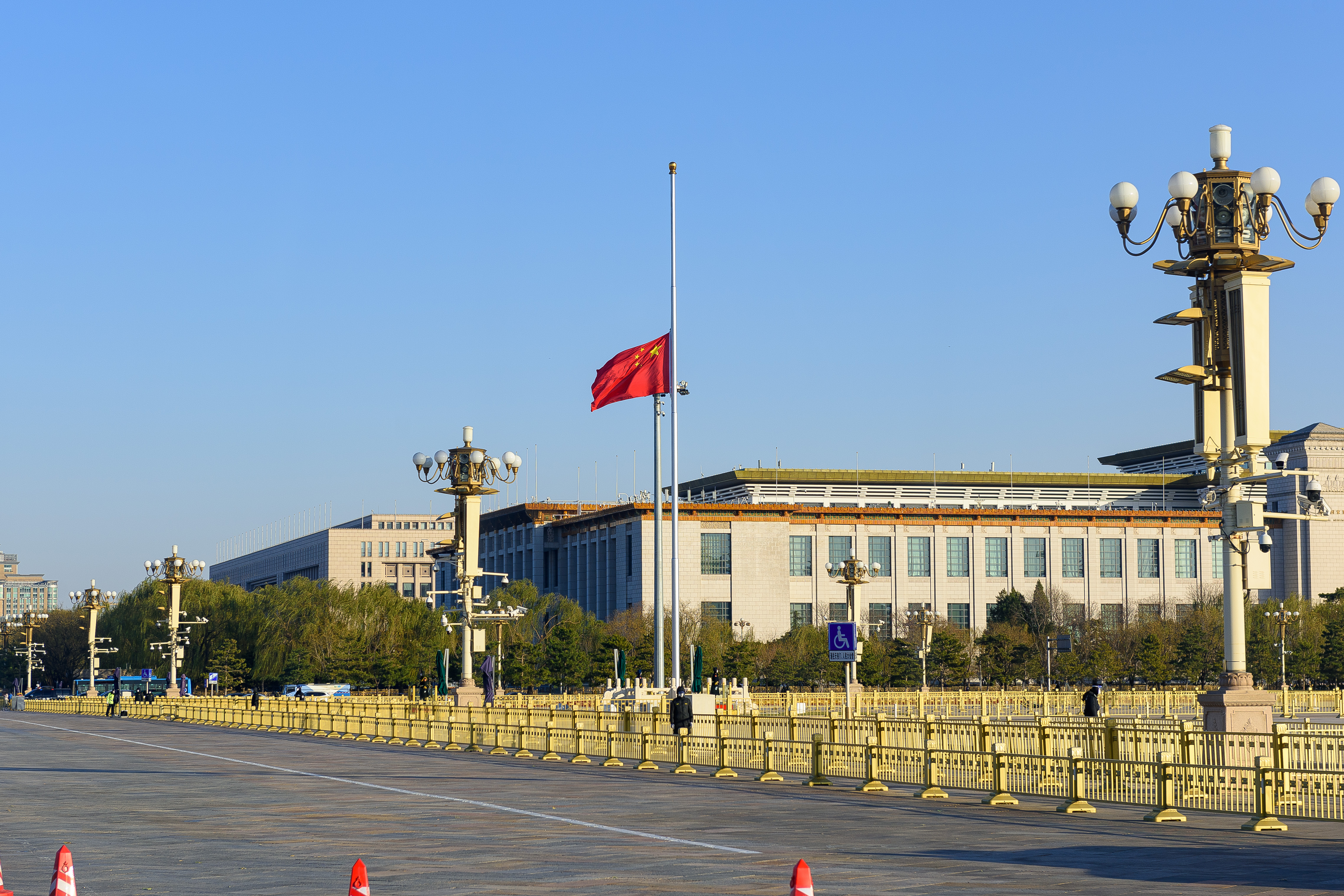
The Chinese flag flying half mast at Tiananmen Square on 1 December 2022, following Jiang Zemin's death.

On 30 November, the Funeral Committee of Jiang Zemin was announced. Xi Jinping was announced as its chairman, with many other current or former high-ranking officials from the CCP as members. On the day of Jiang's death, the Chinese Communist Party released a notice that the national flags would be flown half-staff in key locations of Beijing and diplomatic missions abroad. Foreign heads of state and government were not invited to attend official mourning activities.

On 1 December, a farewell ceremony was held at Huadong Hospital in Shanghai, where some officials from Shanghai and the Funeral Committee, Jiang's friends and relatives and the medical staff paid their respects. Jiang's remains were then transported from the hospital to the Shanghai Hongqiao Airport, and then escorted from Shanghai to Beijing by Funeral Committee members and Politburo Standing Committee member Cai Qi on a special plane. The plane arrived at the Beijing Xijiao Airport at 3:55 pm, where it was received by top leaders including Xi and members of the Politburo Standing Committee.

On 5 December, Xi, members of the Politburo Standing Committee including those who stepped down at the 20th CCP National Congress, other party and state leaders, as well as former leader (and Jiang's successor) Hu Jintao and former premier Wen Jiabao bid farewell to Jiang's body at the 301 Hospital, where they conferred their condolences to Jiang's relatives. Afterwards, they accompanied the hearse carrying Jiang's remains to the Babaoshan Revolutionary Cemetery, where they gave their final farewells. The body was cremated at the cemetery.

On 6 December, the memorial service for Jiang was held at the Great Hall of the People. The memorial began at 10:05 am, and was presided by Cai Qi. It began with a three-minute moment of silence, with the Chinese anthem being played afterwards. Afterwards, Xi Jinping gave a eulogy, stating that Jiang "was an outstanding leader with high prestige, a great Marxist, a great proletarian revolutionist, statesman, military strategist, diplomat, a long-tested communist fighter, and a social leader with Chinese characteristics. He is an outstanding leader of the great cause of communism, the core of the third-generation central leadership of the Chinese Communist Party, and the main founder of the important thought of the "Three Represents". General Secretary Xi Jinping said, "We deeply mourn Comrade Jiang Zemin, and we will turn our grief into strength, and in accordance with the deployment of the 20th National Congress of the Chinese Communist Party, we will work together to build a socialist modern country in an all-round way and comprehensively promote the great rejuvenation of the Chinese nation." After Xi's eulogy, the Internationale was played, with the ceremony concluding afterwards.

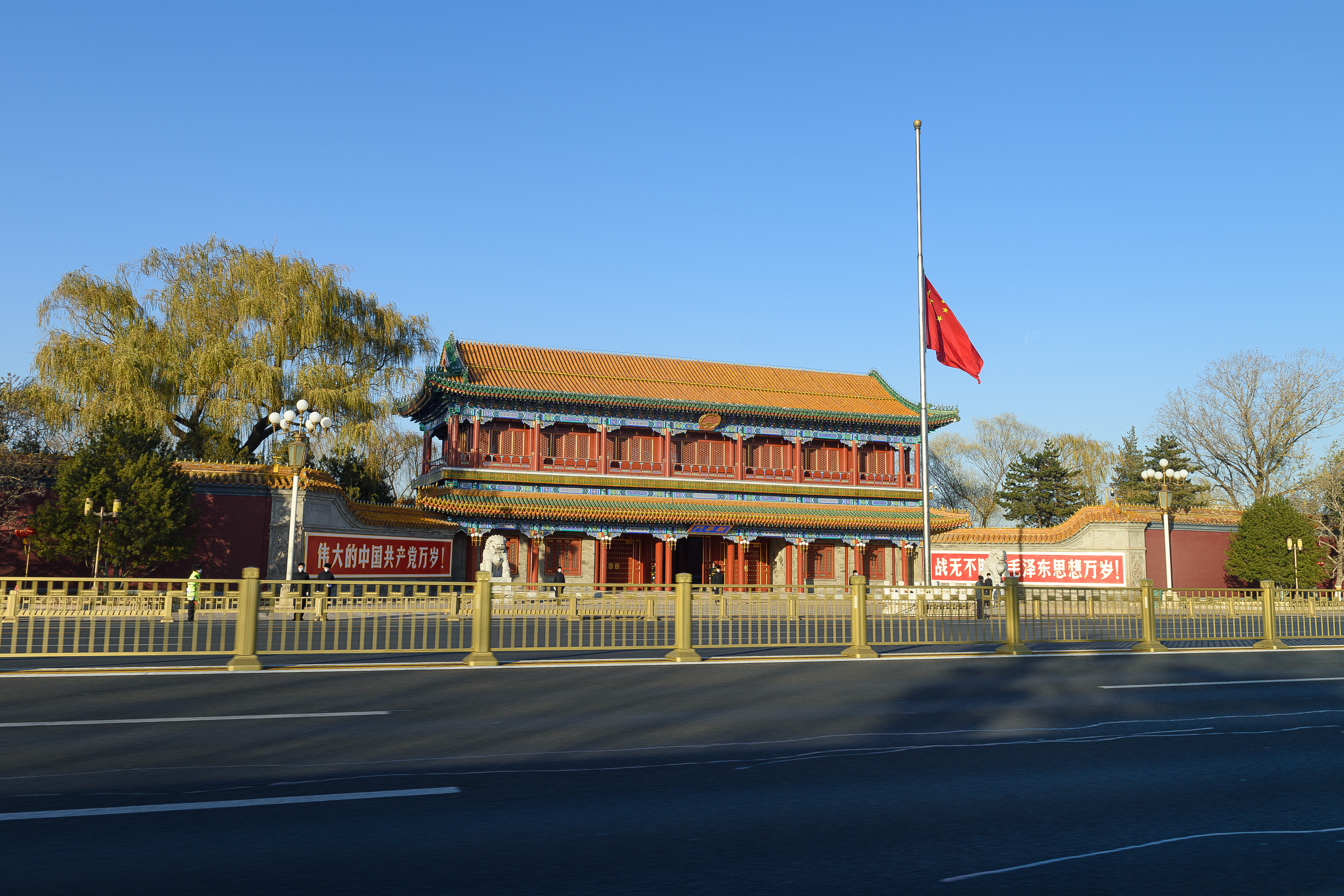
The national flag flying half mast in front of Zhongnanhai, 1 December 2022.

On 11 December, after the conclusion of the memorial services, Jiang's ashes were carried onto a special plane which circled and flew slowly over Beijing before arriving in Shanghai, where it was taken onboard PLA Navy frigate Yangzhou (578) at the Wusong Military Port. At 12:20, Jiang's widow Wang Yeping and other relatives, as well as Cai Qi, slowly scattered Jiang's ashes along with colourful flower petals at the mouth of the Yangtze River.

== Reactions ==
=== People's Republic of China ===
==== Mainland China ====
===== Government =====
- After the death of Jiang Zemin was announced, websites of various government departments used a black and white interface.

===== Societal reaction =====
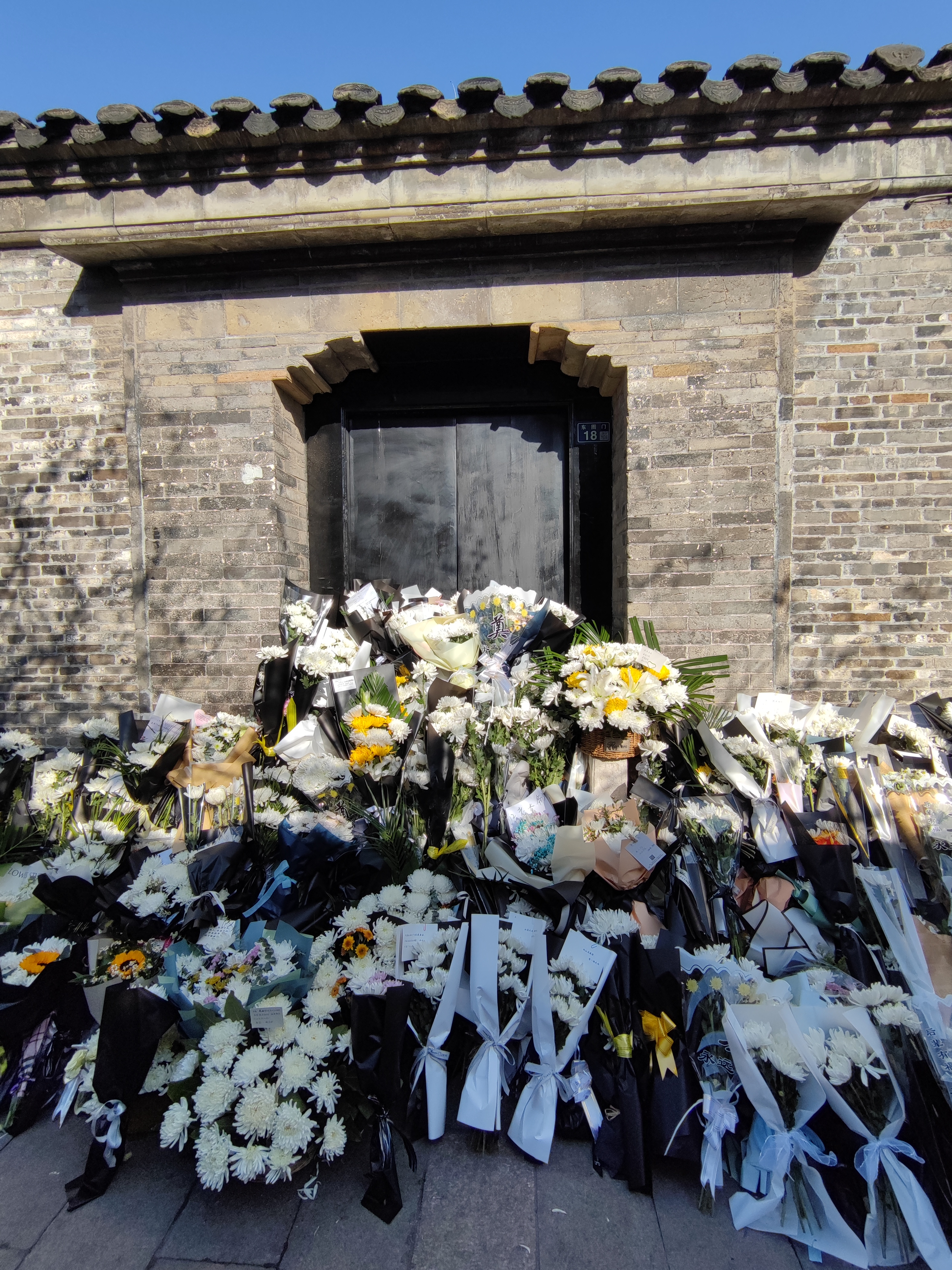
- Flowers laid by mourners at Jiang Zemin's former residence in Yangzhou, Jiangsu
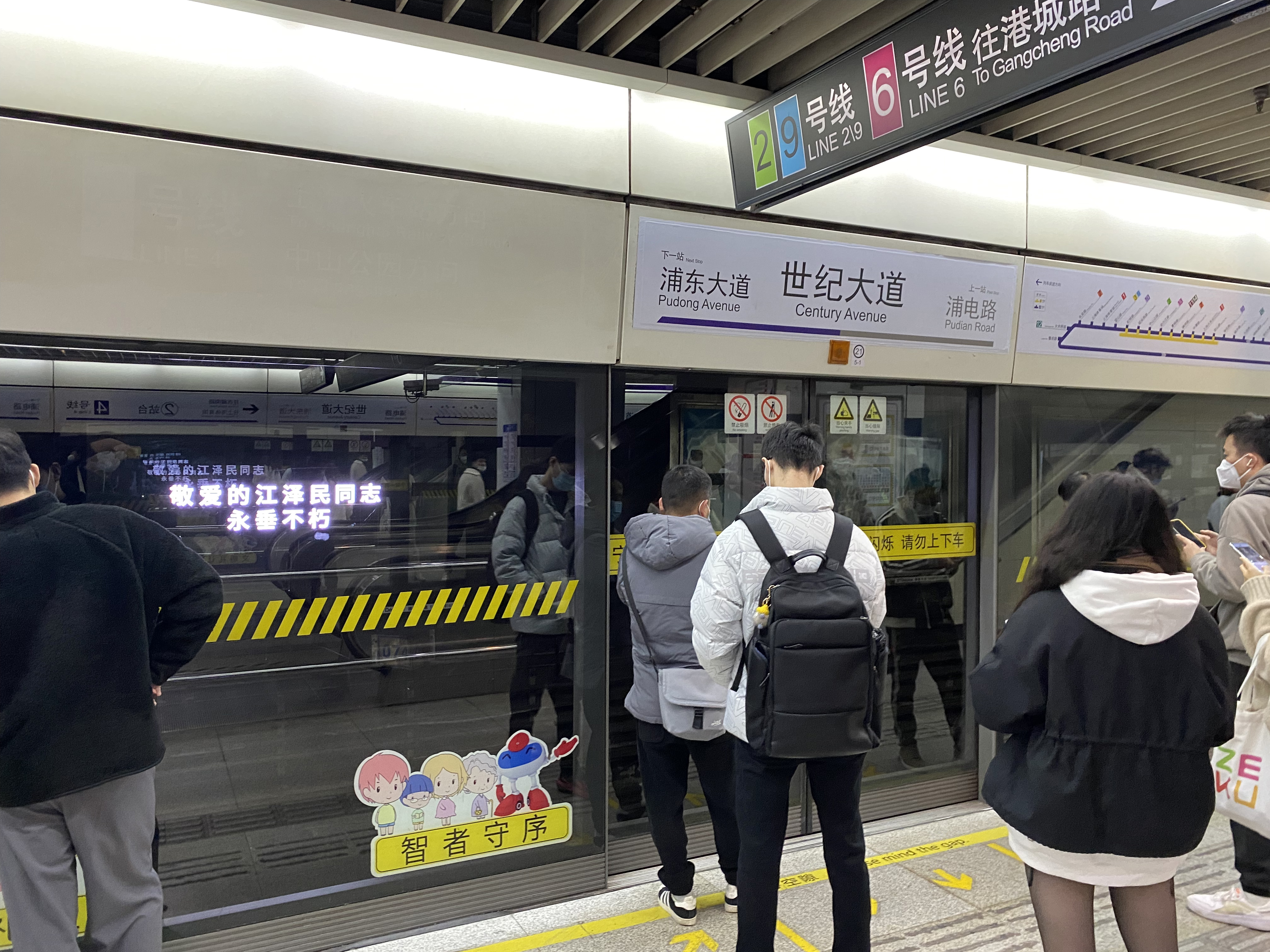
  Century Avenue station of Shanghai, displaying a text that reads "most beloved comrade Jiang Zemin will live forever" on 6 December 2022.
  Siao Yong-ruei, chairman of Wuhan Taiwanese Association; Chen Chi An, chairman of Guangzhou Taiwanese Association and Wu Chia Ying, chairman of Xiamen Taiwanese Association delivered their condolences to former Chinese leader Jiang Zemin: "We are very grateful to him (Jiang Zemin) for his dedication to the development of cross-strait relations and his concern for Taiwan compatriots." Meanwhile, Li Chêng Hung, chairman of the National Federation of Taiwanese Enterprises in mainland China said: "In memory of Mr. Jiang Zemin's achievements and contributions, Taiwanese businessmen and compatriots of our generation should work harder, seize new historical opportunities, promote cross-strait exchanges and cooperation, integration and development, and promote cross-strait peaceful reunification, and come to comfort Mr. Jiang Zemin".

=== Hong Kong ===
==== Government ====
- Chief Executive John Lee expressed his deep sorrow over the passing of former Chinese leader Jiang Zemin. He said: "On behalf of the HKSAR, I extend my deepest condolences to Jiang's family. He broke new grounds for the country's comprehensive reform and opening up, implemented the basic policies of law-based governance of the country and upheld the principles of 'peaceful reunification of China' and 'one country, two systems', making great contributions to the realisation of the smooth return of Hong Kong and Macau". Furthermore, he acknowledged Jiang Zemin as an outstanding leader with high prestige as he was the principal founder of the Theory of Three Represents.
- President of the Legislative Council Andrew Leung also expressed deep condolences on the death of Jiang on behalf of all LegCo members. He commended Jiang as an outstanding leader who led the country to modernization, promoted economic development and raised the living standard of the people, and said that Hong Kong was always close to the heart of Jiang as he visited Hong Kong several times and reached out to various sectors of the community to understand its development and public sentiment.
- Starting from 1 December 2022, the national Chinese flag and HKSAR flag at all government buildings, the Legislative Council Complex and the Judiciary departments were flown at half mast, to commemorate former Chinese leader Jiang Zemin. Furthermore, the interface of the HKSAR Government's website was turned to black and white as well.
- On 6 December 2022, the day of Jiang Zemin's state funeral, the HKSAR Government arranged the Hong Kong Executive Council, all bureaus and departments, and economic and trade offices abroad to observe 3 minutes of silence. All government-funded or held entertainment and celebratory events were to be postponed or cancelled. Primary and secondary schools, special schools, kindergartens, international schools and private-funded institutions were advised to hoist the Chinese and Hong Kong flags at half mast and observe a 3-minute mourning at 10am, on request by the Hong Kong Education Bureau. Furthermore, the Education Bureau advised all schools to suspend celebratory events and watch the official memorial ceremony. The Home and Youth Affairs Bureau of the HKSAR government broadcast the ceremony in designated locations at all 18 districts.

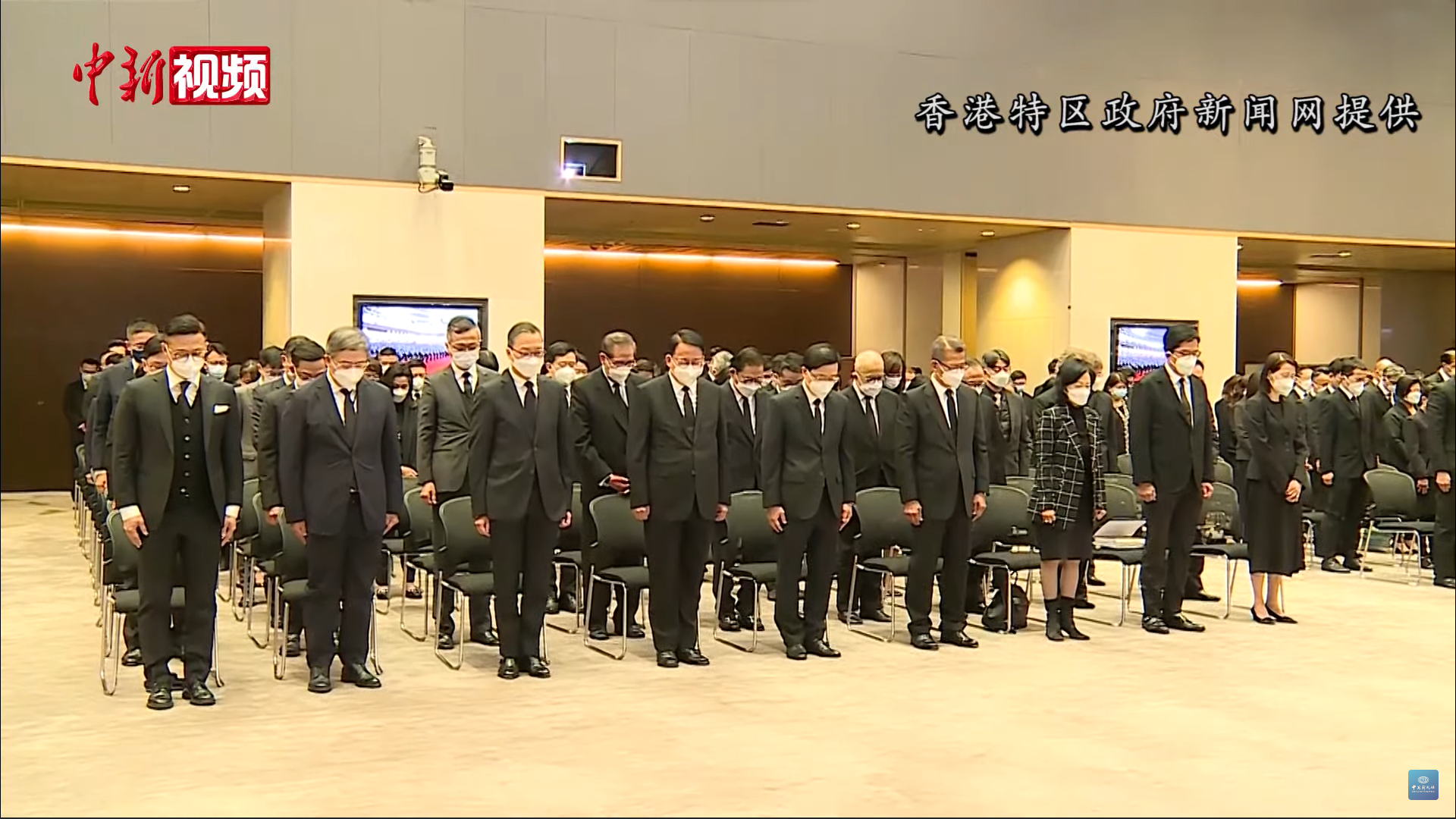
Mourning ceremony in Hong Kong SAR

==== Political ====
- Chairperson of the New People's Party, Non-official Convenor of the Hong Kong Executive Council, councillor of the Hong Kong Legislative Council Regina Ip was "deeply saddened" by the death of Jiang, and expressed her "deepest condolences to his family". Ye Liushuyi mentioned that when she was the first director of the Security Bureau of the SAR Government, she was responsible for his security work in Hong Kong twice. She thought that Jiang Zemin was amiable and humorous: "He once wrote the inscription "Tomorrow will be better" and wished Hong Kong Have a bright future. He is full of confidence in "one country, two systems" and is very supportive of Hong Kong. His love for Hong Kong has always been in her heart.
- New People's Party published a Facebook post, by saying that "Jiang Zemin is the core of the third generation central leadership of the Chinese Communist Party and the great founder of the important thought of "Three Represents". In the 1980s and 1990s, he adhered to the road of reform, opening up and socialist modernization, led China to create a miracle of national power and economy, made the country and its people a prosperous and well-off society, and established an important position on the international stage. The party expresses deep condolences for Jiang Zemin's death, deeply misses Jiang Zemin's contribution to the country and Hong Kong, and hopes that the country will continue to inherit Jiang Zemin's important governance ideas in the future, and work together to promote the great rejuvenation of the Chinese nation in an all-round way."
- Vice Chairman of the National Committee of the Chinese People's Political Consultative Conference and the first Chief Executive of the Hong Kong Special Administrative Region Tung Chee-hwa expressed deep condolences on the passing of Jiang Zemin. Tung Chee-hwa said that he has always firmly believed that Jiang Zemin is a great and wise politician and leader who successfully led the return of Hong Kong in 1997 and implemented the national policy of "one country, two systems, Hong Kong people governing Hong Kong". Tung Chee Hwa expressed that he would be missed.
- Vice Chairman of the National Committee of the Chinese People's Political Consultative Conference and former Chief Executive Leung Chun-ying mourned Jiang Zemin on Facebook, praising that under Jiang's personal care and guidance, Hong Kong society has overcome various difficulties and obstacles and established the Hong Kong Special Administrative Region as scheduled in accordance with the provisions of the "Basic Law" With the first government, the implementation of "one country, two systems", Hong Kong people ruling Hong Kong, a high degree of autonomy, has taken an important first step towards the great cause of peaceful reunification. He said that on 1 July 1997, Jiang Zemin solemnly announced the Chinese government's resumption of the exercise of sovereignty over Hong Kong at the establishment ceremony of the Special Administrative Region. To maintain the long-term prosperity and stability of Hong Kong, and to provide new and greater development space for Hong Kong society through reform and opening up and socialist modernization in the Mainland.” In 1999, he personally wrote an inscription for the Handover Monument located in Wanchai Convention and Exhibition. In the end, he hoped that Hong Kong society should continue to fully and accurately implement the "one country, two systems" principle, not forgetting to return to the original aspiration, to contribute to the complete reunification and modernization of the country, to the great rejuvenation of the Chinese nation, to the prosperity and stability of Hong Kong, and to " President Jiang Zemin is Immortal".
- On 1 December 2022, Hong Kong Chief Executive John Lee and his cabinet, former Chief Executive Carrie Lam, Director of the Liaison Office of the Central People's Government Luo Huining and other heads of central government departments in Hong Kong, heads of disciplinary forces, Hong Kong Executive Council convener Regina Ip, Executive Council members Jeffrey Lam Kin-fung, Joseph Yam Chi-kwong, Martin Liao, chairman of the Legislative Council Andrew Leung, Chairman of Finance Committee Chan Chun-ying and the vice-chairman of the LegCo House Committee Ma Fung-kwok express their condolences in person at the Hong Kong Liaison Office. They all wore white corsages and bowed three times in front of Jiang Zemin's posthumous photo in batches.
- On 2 December 2022, deputy director of the Basic Law Committee Maria Tam, Members of the Standing Committee of the National Committee of the Chinese People's Political Consultative Conference Margaret Chan, Lam Suk-yee, Secretary of the Culture, Sports and Tourism Bureau Kevin Yeung Yun-hung, Hong Kong representatives of the People's Congress Bernard Charnwut Chan, Raymond Tam Chi-yuen, Maggie Chan Man-ki, Cally Kwong, and representatives of all walks of life mourned Jiang Zemin at the Hong Kong Liaison Office.
- On 2 December 2022, legislative councillors observed a one-minute silence before the Legislative Council House Committee meeting.
- On 2 December 2022, several politicians in the pro-democracy camp mourned Jiang Zemin in person at the Hong Kong Liaison Office. Bruce Liu, councillor of the Provisional Legislative Council and former Hong Kong LegCo councillor, missed Jiang Zemin's enlightened and open attitude, his grand demeanor and humor. Jiang described Hong Kong as a very prosperous society under Jiang's leadership. He also promoted "one country, two systems" and successfully brought the country to the world. I believe Hong Kong people miss him very much. As for whether the ADPL has discussed coming together to mourn, Liao pointed out that this time it was spontaneous, and several people came together to express their gratitude.

==== Societal and economical ====
- Following the announcement of Jiang Zemin's death, most Hong Kong media and news agencies have changed their logo or websites to black and white, including RTHK, all free channels under TVB, ViuTV, HOY TV (Hong Kong International Finance Channel), Phoenix TV (Channel V), Star TV, Ta Kung Pao, Wen Wei Po, HK01, Now TV, and Cable TV.
- From 1 December 2022 onwards, Hong Kong Liaison Office has set up a mourning hall to accept condolences from all walks of life in Hong Kong. Mourners were required to book an appointment in advance, strictly abide with local anti-pandemic policies (like using "LeaveHomeSafe"), hold a negative COVID-19 rapid antigen test, or nucleic test and show the blue code (of the health code), and were also required to dress solemnly, not to carry handbags and other items, and wear N95 or above standard masks throughout the process. On the morning of 1 December 2022, large numbers of citizens went to mourn outside the Liaison Office of the Central People's Government in Hong Kong. Some praised Jiang Zemin for his outstanding performance, while others cherished his personal charm. Some citizens immediately left their work after learning the news of the Liaison Office setting up a memorial service, and rushed from North Point to Sai Wan. He praised Jiang Zemin for answering reporters' questions in English: "I respect him as a grandfather." People lined up on pedestrian bridges with "Eternal Dear Comrade Jiang Zemin" printed on them or holding Jiang Zemin's photo in mourning. On 2 December 2022, a large number of citizens continued to go to the Hong Kong Liaison Office to pay their respects. Some citizens expressed regret over Jiang Zemin's death, thinking that "he was a relatively great leader." River water does not violate well water", referring to his contribution to the return of Hong Kong during his tenure.
- On 2 December 2022, representatives from the business sector mourned Jiang Zemin at the Liaison Office, those included Sun Hung Kai Properties chairman Raymond Kwok, executive director Adam Kwok Kai-fai and Kwok Kai-wang.
- On 2 December 2022, before the graduation parade ceremony for the Immigration Department students, the audience stood in silence for a minute in memory of Jiang Zemin.
- From 2 to 5 December 2022, in respect for Jiang Zemin, a firework show at the Hong Kong Disneyland was cancelled, while its internet interface turned to black and white. Hong Kong Ocean Park also changed its webpage interface in memory of the former Chinese leader.

=== Macau ===
==== Government ====
- Chief Executive Ho Iat Seng expressed, on behalf of the Macau SAR and on his own behalf, his deepest regret at the passing of former Chinese leader Jiang Zemin. He highlighted that Jiang Zemin paid great attention to the development and life of his compatriots in Macau, noting that Jiang visited Macau twice, where his absence will be felt deeply, and all of his contributions to the country and the people will live on in memory. Moreover, Ho's statement also recalls Jiang Zemin as an outstanding leader, a great Marxist, a great proletarian revolutionary, statesman, military strategist and diplomat, a long-tested communist fighter, and an outstanding leader of the great cause of socialism with Chinese characteristics. He was the core of the CCP's third generation of central collective leadership and the principal founder of the Theory of Three Represents."
- Macau Liaison Office announced that The Liaison Office has set up a mourning hall on the second floor of the office building to receive condolences from all walks of life in Macao.
- Starting from 1 December 2022, the national flags of the Macao Special Administrative Region and overseas institutions and the flags of the region would fly at half-staff.

==== Political ====
- Chief Executive Ho Iat Seng, Vice Chairman of the National Committee of the Chinese People's Political Consultative Conference Edmund Ho, Director of the Macau Liaison Office Zheng Xincong, former Chief Executive Fernando Chui bowed their condolences one by one, and all the major government officials also bowed their condolences at the scene.

==== Societal and economical ====
- Macau Daily, Exmoo, TDM and many other Macauese media and TV stations in Macau have changed their website pictures and logos to black and white.

=== Republic of China (Taiwan) ===
==== Government ====
- Presidential Office spokesperson Xavier Chang expressed condolences to the family of Jiang.

=== International organizations ===
- European Union: President Charles Michel expressed deep condolences on the death of Jiang Zemin on behalf of EU during his visit to China and meeting with Xi Jinping.
- United Nations: Secretary General António Guterres issued a statement expressing deep sorrow over the passing of Jiang Zemin. He praised Jiang Zemin's unswerving advocacy of international participation. He believed that China's great economic progress and successful accession to the World Trade Organization were the hallmark achievements of Jiang Zemin's tenure. The excellent cooperation with Jiang Zemin during his tenure as Portuguese Prime Minister ensured the smooth handover of Macau's sovereignty to China. Finally, on behalf of the United Nations, he extended sincere condolences to Jiang Zemin's family, the Chinese government and people.
- (United Nations) UN Security Council: Before the meeting on nuclear non-proliferation, all the delegates stood up and observed a minute's silence for the deceased former paramount leader of China, Jiang Zemin.

=== International governments ===
- Bangladesh: Prime Minister Sheikh Hasina sent a letter of condolences to Xi Jinping expressing "deepest condolences and heartfelt sympathies" on Jiang's passing and that the people of Bangladesh "stand beside the government and the friendly people of China at this time of mourning."
- Belarus: President Alexander Lukashenko sent his condolences to Xi Jinping where he described Jiang as "a true leader who devoted his life to tireless service to the Motherland." He also further stated Jiang "stood at the origins of the Belarusian-Chinese relations and contributed to their steady strengthening over many years."
- Brazil: President Jair Bolsonaro sent a note of condolences to the Chinese government and to the family of Jiang Zemin, remembering that Jiang twice visited Brazil, in 1993 and 2001, contributing to the strengthening of bilateral relations. Then President-elect Luiz Inácio Lula da Silva also offered his condolences, remarking that "under Jiang Zemin's leadership, China grew extraordinarily, freeing millions of people from poverty".
- Brunei: Sultan Hassanal Bolkiah sent his condolences stating that Jiang "will always be remembered by the Chinese people for the steadfast dedication in enhancing the overall well-being of the people as well as leading the country into greater economic stability and prosperity."
- Cambodia: Prime Minister Hun Sen sent a letter of condolences where he described Jiang's passing as an "immense loss of an outstanding statesman who has worked tirelessly his entire life for China’s development to improve the Chinese people’s life." King Norodom Sihamoni also offered his condolences.
- Cuba: General Secretary of the Communist Party of Cuba and President Miguel Diaz-Canel sent his condolences to Xi Jinping where he expressed "deep sorrow" over the death of Jiang. In response to his death, Cuba declared official mourning to be observed on 1 December, with the flag of Cuba hoisted at half-mast in public buildings and military facilities.
- Czech Republic: President Miloš Zeman offered his condolences stating that "Jiang had achieved a great success in promoting China's economic reform and his achievements will be recorded in Chinese history." He also further added that he highly appreciates "Jiang's ability to promote China's economic development and stability."
- India: President Droupadi Murmu and Prime Minister Narendra Modi expressed their condolences on Jiang's passing.
- Indonesia: Only diplomatic envoy from Indonesia left messages in a condolence book at the Ministry of Foreign Affairs. No official government level statements
- Japan: Prime Minister Fumio Kishida stated: "I am deeply saddened to hear the news of the death of His Excellency Jiang Zemin. His Excellency Jiang Zemin not only promoted the Reform and Opening policy, but also contributed to the development of China. He also made his first official visit to my country as the Chinese President in 1998 and played an important role in Sino-Japanese relations. I would like to wish His Excellency Jiang Zemin rest in peace, and at the same time express my heartfelt condolences to the bereaved family, the Chinese government and the people."
- Kazakhstan: In his telegram of condolences, President Kassym-Jomart Tokayev stated that Jiang was an "outstanding son of his country", "who selflessly served in the name of prosperity of China enhancing the country's authority in the international community."
- Laos: General Secretary of the Lao People's Revolutionary Party and President Thongloun Sisoulith has expressed his "deep condolences" over Jiang Zemin's death during his visit to China.
- Malaysia: Then-new Prime Minister Anwar Ibrahim paid his respects on Jiang's death at the China Embassy and acknowledged "his outstanding leadership and legacy". Former Prime minister Mahathir Mohamad did not make any statements in particular.
- Maldives: President Ibrahim Mohamed Solih sent a message of condolence to Xi Jinping on Wednesday, offering sympathies to him and the people of China on Jiang's death.
- Nepal: In a message of condolences, President Bidya Devi Bhandari stated that Nepal has lost a true and distinguished friend, and recalled the 1996 state visit to Nepal by Jiang Zemin that contributed to further strengthening of close friendship and cooperation between Nepal and China. Prime Minister Sher Bahadur Deuba also sent his condolences, where he called Jiang "a great friend and well-wisher of Nepal."
- Nicaragua: President Daniel Ortega offered his condolences stating that "the spiritual and cultural legacy left by former President Jiang Zemin is guiding and will continue to guide the Chinese people for greater development."
- North Korea: General Secretary of the Workers' Party of Korea and President of the State Affairs Kim Jong Un sent a message of condolence to Xi Jinping where he expressed "deep condolences" over Jiang's death stating that Jiang "made a great contribution to the cause of building socialism with Chinese characteristics", and "sincerely supported and encouraged the socialist cause of the DPRK people and made positive efforts to consolidate and develop the traditional DPRK-China friendship."
- Norway: King Harald V sent his condolences on behalf of him and the Norwegian people to CCP general secretary Xi Jinping, expressing his sadness over the passing of Jiang Zemin.
- Pakistan: Prime Minister Shehbaz Sharif offered his condolences on Twitter stating Jiang was "a wise leader and a statesman." He also stated that Pakistan "fondly remember him as a great friend who made valuable contributions in strengthening Pakistan-China relations."
- Palestine: President of the Palestinian Authority Mahmoud Abbas condoled on Jiang's death stating that he and the Palestinian people will remember Jiang as an "outstanding leader who is a supporter of the Palestinian people and their cause and legal rights, a promoter of Palestine-China relations, and an eyewitness to the establishment of the diplomatic relations between Palestine and China."
- Russia: President Vladimir Putin called Xi Jinping, saying that "Jiang Zemin has made valuable contributions to the development of Russia-China relations and raising the relationship between the two countries to the level of trusting partners and strategic cooperation", expressing "deep condolences" for Jiang Zemin's death.
- Singapore: President Halimah Yacob and Prime Minister Lee Hsien Loong sent condolence letters to CCP general secretary Xi Jinping and Premier Li Keqiang respectively, expressing their condolences for the passing of Jiang Zemin. Lee Hsien Loong said that Jiang Zemin led China through a critical period of development. His steady leadership and determination to reform and opening up played a key role in China's integration into the world economy and its emergence on the world stage. During Jiang Zemin's state visit to Singapore in 1994, Lee Hsien Loong said that he was honored to be Minister of Attendance at that time.
- South Korea: Ministry of Foreign Affairs expressed condolences on Jiang's death stating that the Government of ROK highly appreciated Jiang's contribution to the development of the China–South Korea relations, including his role in their establishment in 1992. President Yook Suk Yeol visited the Chinese Embassy in Seoul to offer condolences.
- Sri Lanka: President Ranil Wickremesinghe paid his respects on Jiang's death at the Chinese Embassy in Colombo and signed the book of condolence, stating that he had regarded Jiang as an "excellent leader who had rendered great service to the People’s Republic of China."
- Tajikistan: President Emomali Rahmon sent a telegram of condolences to Xi Jinping where he expressed condolences on Jiang's death stating that Jiang "with his long and productive work in various high and important government positions, embodied the characteristics and content of a perfect period of development of the People's Republic of China, and gained honor, respect, and reputation inside and outside the country."
- Tanzania: President Samia Suluhu Hassan expressed her condolences on Jiang's passing to the CCP, the Chinese people and Jiang's family.
- Thailand: Minister of Foreign Affairs Don Pramudwinai expressed his deep condolences stating that Jiang will be long remembered for his "legacy of boosting China’s economic development and the country’s global prestige." He also said the Thai people will cherish Jiang's positive role in strengthening Thai-Chinese relations.
- United States: Ambassador to China Nicholas Burns said, "The United States expresses condolences to former President of the PRC Jiang Zemin’s family and the Chinese people. President Jiang worked to advance the U.S.–PRC relationship at a consequential time while managing our differences – an imperative that continues today." Senator Dianne Feinstein stated that "Jiang Zemin was a transformative leader in China and I was happy for the opportunity to maintain an open channel of communication with him." She also stated that "I knew Jiang Zemin when I was mayor of San Francisco and he was mayor of Shanghai and our two cities were sister cities. He showed himself to be an intelligent and joyful man, and I wasn't surprised when he later became president of China".
- Venezuela: President Nicolás Maduro expressed his deep condolences over Jiang's passing stating that "Jiang had forged a profound friendship with the people of Latin America and Venezuela."
- Vietnam: General Secretary of the Communist Party Nguyen Phu Trong, President Nguyen Xuan Phuc, Prime Minister Pham Minh Chinh and Chairman of the National Assembly Vương Đình Huệ sent message of condolences to their Chinese counterparts and Jiang's family, where they stated that "Jiang had made contributions to the revolutionary cause and building of socialism with Chinese characteristics; and facilitated normalization of ties and promotion of China-Vietnam relations."

== See also ==
- Death and state funeral of Mao Zedong
- Death and state funeral of Deng Xiaoping
