= Babaoshan Revolutionary Cemetery =

Cemetery in Shijingshan District, Beijing

Coordinates: 39°54′28″N 116°14′09″E

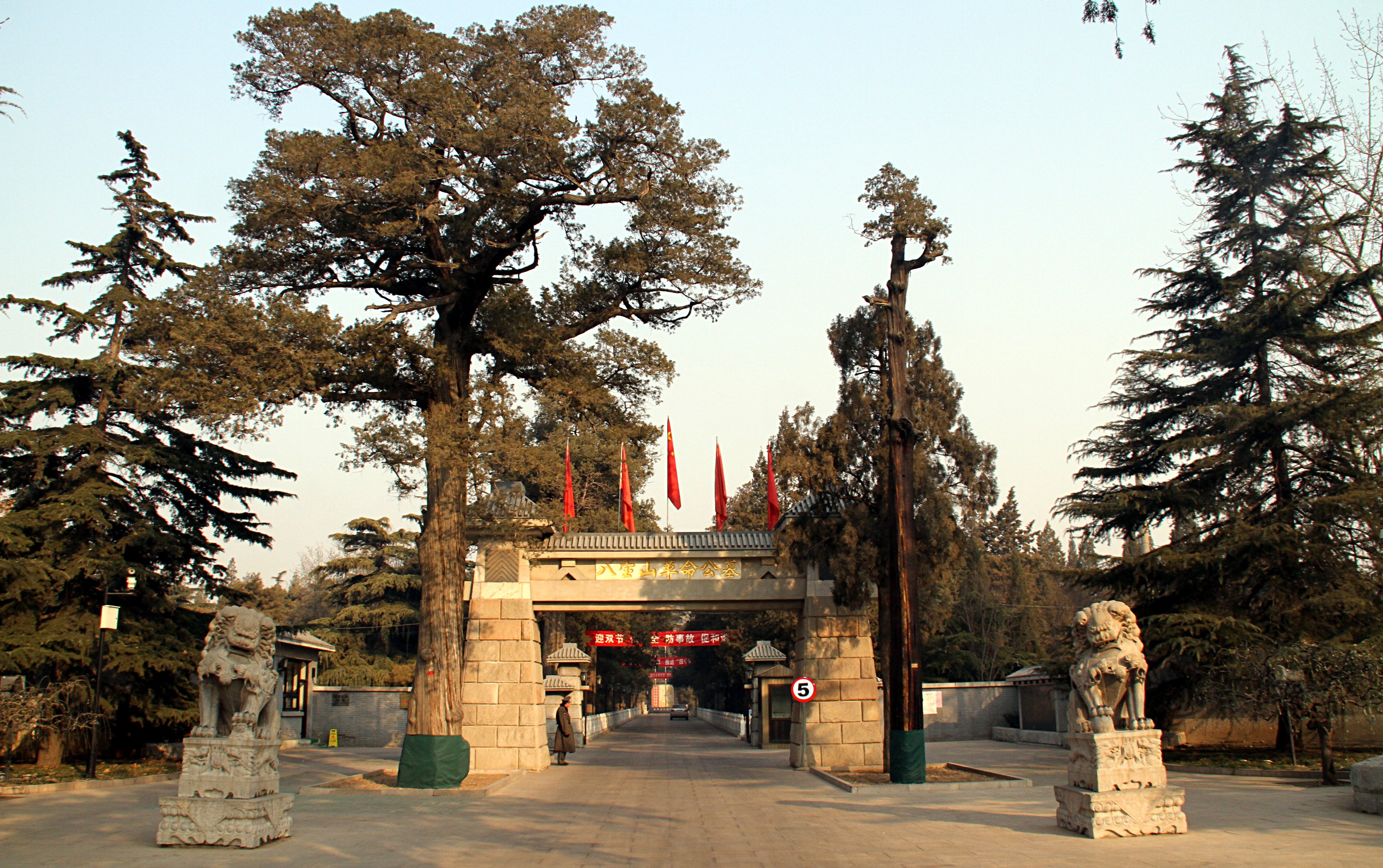
- Main entrance
- Traditional Chinese: 八寶山革命公墓
- Simplified Chinese: 八宝山革命公墓
Transcriptions
Standard Mandarin
- Hanyu Pinyin: Bābǎoshān gémìng gōngmù
- Wade–Giles: Pa^{1}-pao^{3}-shan^{1} ko^{2}-ming^{4} kung^{1}-mu^{4}
- IPA: [pápàʊʂán kɤ̌mîŋ kʊ́ŋmû]

The Babaoshan Revolutionary Cemetery (Chinese: 八宝山革命公墓) is Beijing's main resting place for the highest-ranking revolutionary heroes, high-ranking party and state leaders and, in recent years, individuals deemed of major importance due to their contributions to society. In Chinese, Babaoshan literally means "The Eight-Treasure Mountains". The cemetery is located in Babaoshan Subdistrict, Shijingshan District, in western Beijing Municipality.

== History ==
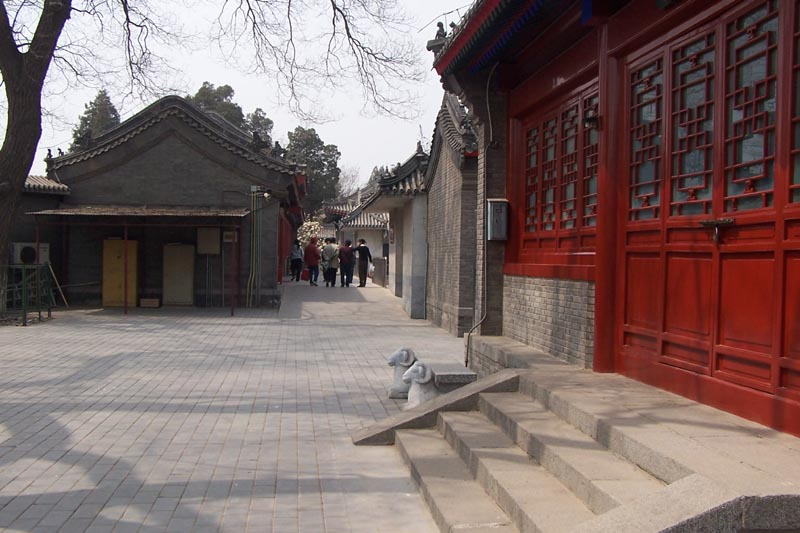
Buildings inside the cemetery

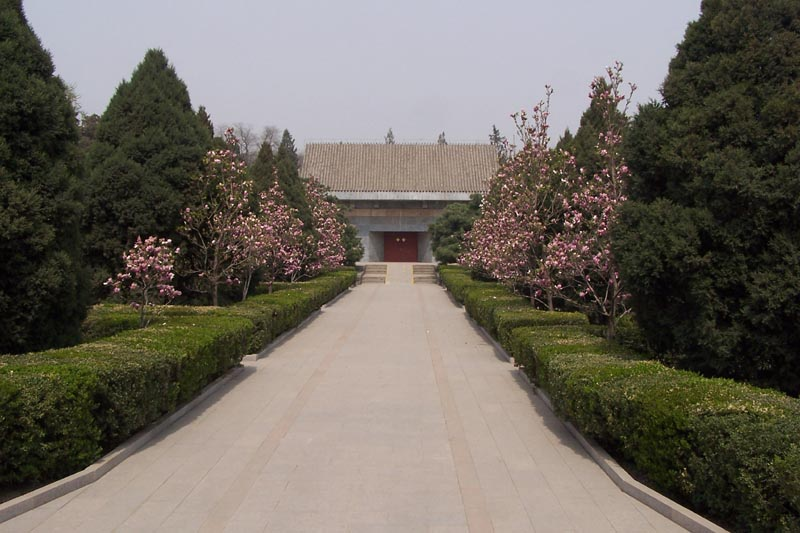
Buildings inside the cemetery

The Babaoshan Revolutionary Cemetery, with an area of 0.10 square kilometres and located in the western frontiers of Beijing's massive urban sprawl, was first built as a temple in honor of General Gang Bing, a Ming dynasty soldier who castrated himself as an act of obedience for the Yongle Emperor. The emperor designated the area surrounding the temple as the final resting place of concubines and eunuchs. Over time, the Taoist temple became a senior's home for retired eunuchs. The official name of the temple was (Chinese: 褒忠护国祠; pinyin: bāo zhōng hù guó cí), roughly translating into Temple of Loyalty and Defender of the Nation.

The last abbot of the temple was Xin Xiuming (信修明), who was married and had two children. Due to the harsh living conditions of rural China, Xin Xiuming, when he was 19 and against the strong oppositions of his family members, castrated himself and became a eunuch for Puyi. After the establishment of Republic of China, Xin Xiuming left the Forbidden City and went to live in the Temple of Loyalty to the Nation, and by 1930, he had risen to the top as the abbot of the Taoist temple. Under Abbot Xin's management, the Taoist temple prospered as an agricultural business establishment: 52 Chinese acres of land that the temple owned were farmed by the eunuchs themselves, another 157 Chinese acres of land the temple owned were farmed jointly by eunuchs and tenant farmers, and the remaining 269 Chinese acres of land the temple owned were rented out to be farmed by tenant farmers. When the communists decided to turn the temple into a cemetery, Abbot Xin Xiuming was able to negotiate with the then deputy mayor of Beijing, Mr. Wu Han a good deal for the eunuchs: the government would pay the full price for all assets of the temple, and pay each eunuch a monthly pension until his death. The abbot also convinced the government to arrange vehicles to help relocate eunuchs to two new locations. Those older eunuchs were relocated to a Taoist temple for eunuchs at Colored Glazed River (Liulihe), and the rest were located to another Taoist temple for eunuchs at Westward Tilted Street (Xixiejie).

In the 1950s, the cemetery was established as a burial place for those deemed the political and military martyrs of China.

The ashes of the Xuantong Emperor were interred at the cemetery in 1967 upon his death. They were later moved to the Hualong Imperial Cemetery, near the Western Qing tombs, in 1995. The remains of his brother Prince Pujie still rest at Babaoshan Cemetery.

Israel Epstein, a Pole who immigrated to China, was honored and cremated at Babaoshan in 2005.

In January 2010, eight individuals (four UN peacekeepers and four Chinese delegates) who were killed in the 2010 Haiti earthquake were also laid to rest at Babaoshan as martyrs.

On 5 December 2022, former General Secretary of the Chinese Communist Party and leader of China's third generation from 1989 to 2002 Jiang Zemin was cremated at the crematorium in preparation for his state funeral.

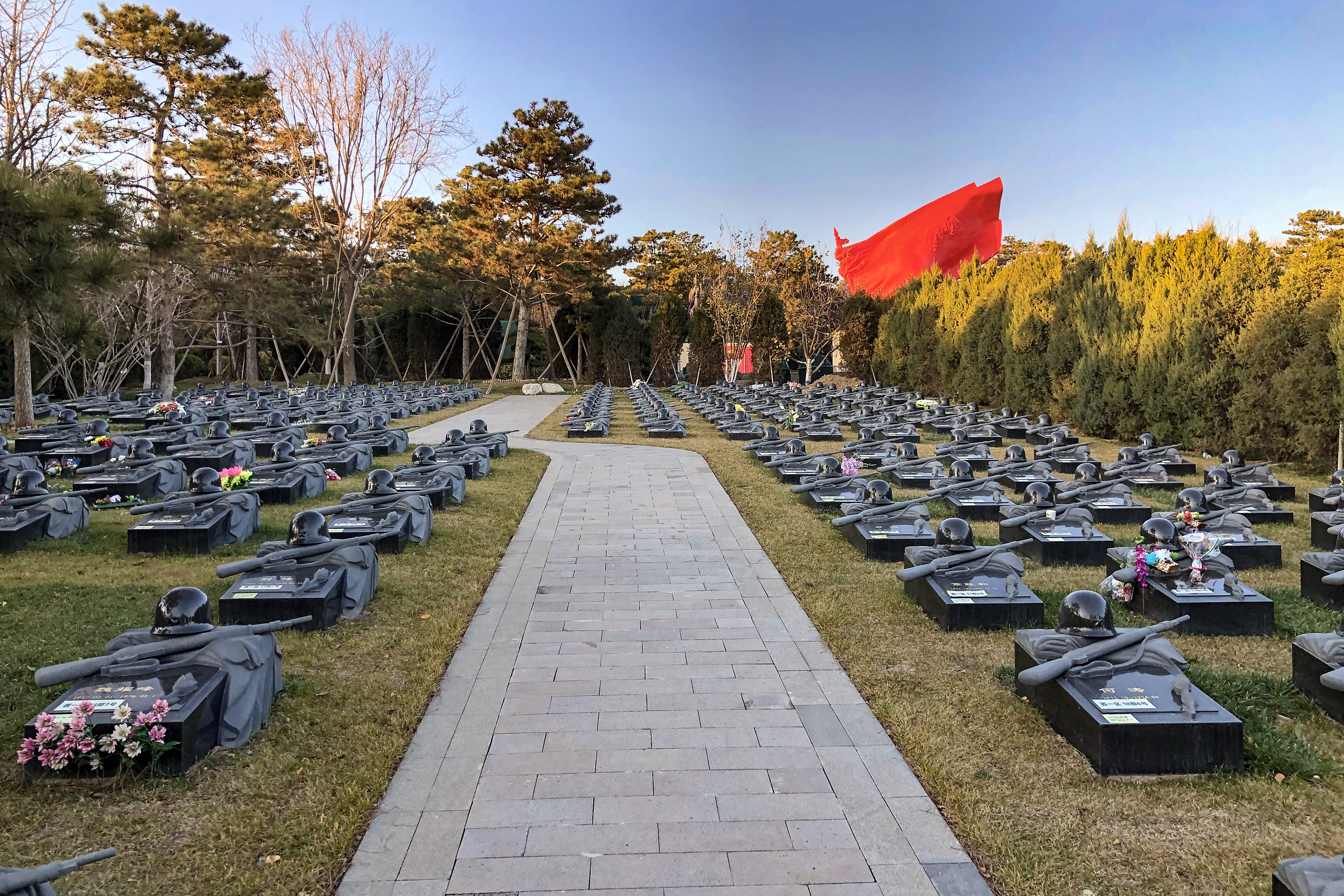
Martyrs' cemetery in Babaoshan

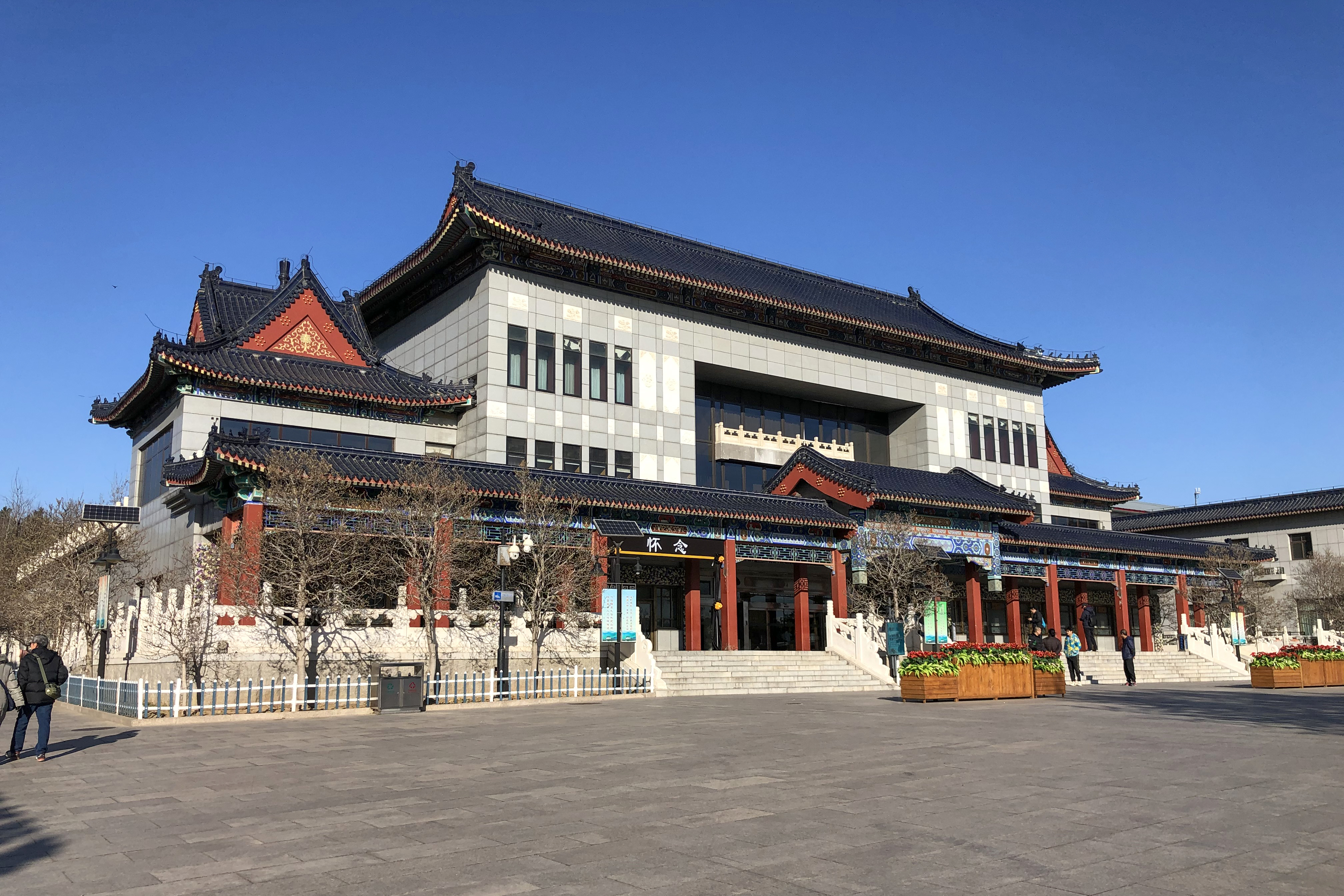
The crematorium at Babaoshan

== Notable people buried at Babaoshan ==
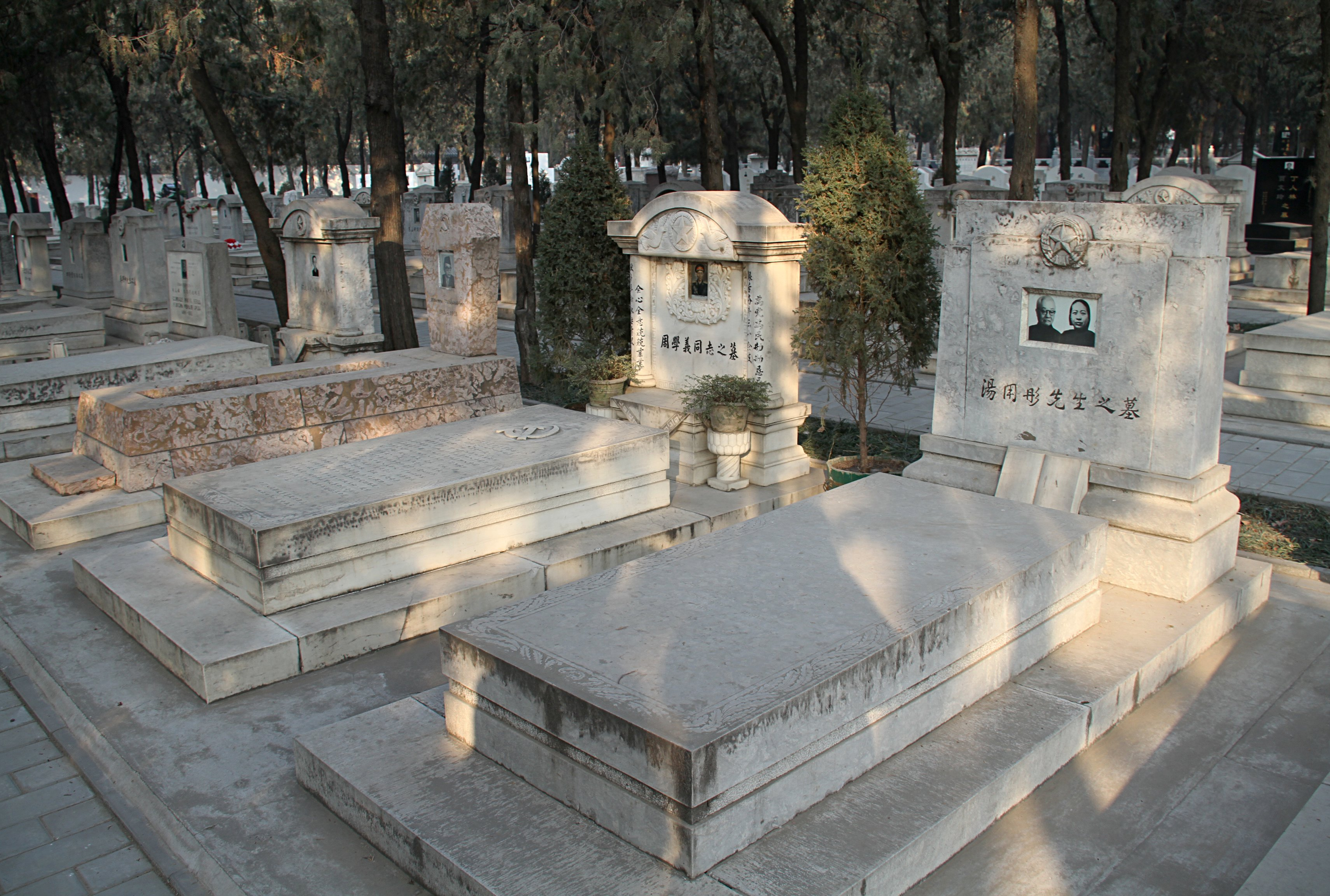
Graves at the cemetery.

- Xuantong Emperor (1906–1967, remains moved)
- Prince Pujie (1907–1994)
- Bo Yibo (1908–2007)
- Cao Diqiu (1909-1976)
- Eugene Chen (1878–1944)
- Chen Shunyao, wife of former state Councillor Song Ping (buried 2019)
- Chen Yun (1905–1995)
- Dong Biwu (1886–1975)
- Israel Epstein (1915–2005)
- Geng Biao (1909–2000)
- George Hatem (aka Ma Haide) (1910–1988)
- Shirley Graham Du Bois (1897-1977)
- Hua Luogeng (1910–1985)
- Lao She (1899–1966)
- Li Fuchun (1900–1975)
- Li Keqiang (1955–2023)
- Li Keran (1907–1989)
- Li Peng (1928–2019)
- Li Rui (1917–2019)
- Li Siguang (1889–1971)
- Li Xiannian (1909–1992)
- Liao Chengzhi (1908–1983)
- Lin Boqu (1886–1960)
- Liu Fuzhi (1917–2013)
- Liu Yazi (1887–1958)
- Long Yun (1884-1962)
- Lü Zhengcao (1904–2009)
- Luo Ronghuan (1902–1963)
- Luo Ruiqing (1906–1978)
- Hans Müller (1915–1994)
- Ngapoi Cedain Zhoigar (1915–2012)
- Ngapoi Ngawang Jigme (1910–2009)
- Dorise Nielsen (1902–1980), former Canadian Member of Parliament
- Nie Rongzhen (1899–1992)
- Peng Dehuai (1898–1974)
- Peng Zhen (1902–1997)
- Puren (1918–2015)
- Qi Gong (1912–2005)
- Qian Xuesen (1911–2009)
- Qiao Shi (1924–2015)
- Qu Qiubai (1899–1935)
- Manya Reiss (1900–1962)
- Ren Bishi (1904–1950)
- Agnes Smedley (1892–1950)
- Douglas Springhall (1901–1953)
- Anna Louise Strong (1885–1970)
- Tao Zhu (1908–1969)
- Tan Zhenlin (1902–1983)
- Wan Li (1916–2015)
- Wang Dongxing (1916–2015)
- Wang Guangmei (1921–2006)
- Wang Yaowu (1904–1968)
- Wei Wenbo (1905-1987)
- Wen Yiduo (1899–1946)
- Yao Yilin (1917–1994)
- Yu Qiuli (1914–1999)
- Zaitao (1887–1970)
- Zeng Shan (1899–1972)
- Zhang Aiping (1910–2003)
- Zhang Lan (1872–1955)
- Zhang Wannian (1928–2015)
- Zhou Chunquan (1905–1985)
- Zhu De (1886–1976)
- Zhu Rongji (1928–2026)
- Hoàng Văn Hoan (1905–1991)

== See also ==
- List of national cemeteries by country
- Wuzhi Mountain Military Cemetery
- Revolutionary Martyrs' Cemetery
- Patriotic Martyrs' Cemetery
- Mausoleum of Mao Zedong
