= Michael Shapiro (journalist) =

British journalist and translator

- Born: February 28, 1910; Berestechko, Ukraine
- Died: September 29, 1986 (aged 76); Beijing, China
- Occupations: Journalist, Translator

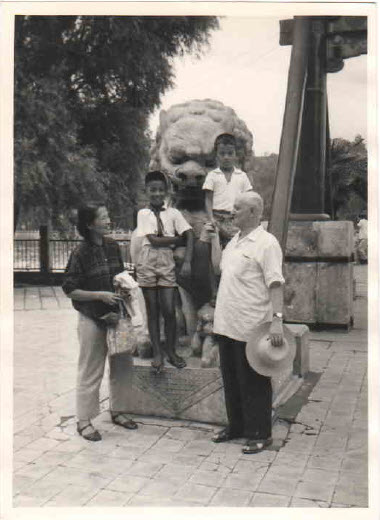

Michael (Mendel) Shapiro (February 28, 1910 – September 29, 1986) was a Ukrainian-born British journalist and outspoken communist. In the late 1930s and during the 1940s he was active in tenants’ rights activities and became a Stepney councilor. He joined the Communist Party of Great Britain (CPGB) in 1934 and in 1949 was sent to China. He became one of the Western long-term residents in Beijing, was involved in training journalists in the Xinhua News Agency and worked with the teams that translated Chairman Mao's works. Although he spent 5 years in Qincheng Prison during the Cultural Revolution he remained committed to the communist cause and after his release he spent the rest of his life in China.

== Early life and education ==
Michael's father was Alexander "Marks" Chaim Shapiro (born in Berestechko, Ukraine on 29 April 1877) and his mother was Rebecca "Rivka" Odel Shapiro (born Kairys in Radyvyliv, Ukraine on 14 December 1883). Michael and his older sister Annie were born in Ukraine. His brother Jack and two younger sisters, Edith and Beatrice (Beattie), were born in England. Chaim and Rivka left eastern Europe/Russia in the early 1910s and settled in Stepney in the East End of London where many Jews settled after escaping from eastern Europe. Chaim gave private lessons in Hebrew. Rivka was fluent in Hebrew, Yiddish, Russian, Polish and English.

From 1928 to 1931, Shapiro attended the University of London. He was awarded the Lilian Knowles Scholarship by the London School of Economics (25 pounds paid monthly in arrears). He may have been somewhat officious, since a comment about him stated “…his is a deserving case; he is a clever young man, and if he had not had such a good opinion of himself he would have got a first. He bears a good character in the School.” He graduated with a B.Sc. in economics. He became a naturalized citizen in 1931. He later lectured in economics at the London School of Economics. He was vice-chairman of the London University Socialist Society.

Michael and his younger brother Jack joined the Young Communist League in 1931 and the Communist Party of Great Britain in 1934.

Shapiro became an expert on housing questions and a leader of the tenants’ struggles throughout the country. Under the name of Michael Best, he wrote about housing issues for the Daily Worker. In 1937, he became the first Secretary of the Stepney Tenants Defense League. Around 1939, he was instrumental in the formation of the National Federation of Residents’ and Tenants’ Associations and functioned as its General Secretary. He worked on projects with the Architects and Technicians Organization (ATO) which focused on progressive housing and planning policy and building design staff employment conditions. One of the ATO founders was Berthold Lubetkin whose firm, Tecton, employed Shapiro's wife as a secretary.

Shortly before World War II, Shapiro went to Germany and gathered information about Nazi Germany for his journalistic writings.

== Career ==
=== 1940s ===
During World War II, Shapiro led demonstrations advocating for better air raid shelters, notably invading the Savoy Hotel's shelter in 1940 to protest inadequate protection for East End residents. Between 1941 and 1949, Shapiro served as Secretary of the London District Committee of the Communist Party of Great Britain, Secretary of the Party's Stepney branch and Secretary of the Party's Architects’ Committee. After the war, Shapiro was one of twelve Communist councilors elected in Stepney in 1945 and took office on the Stepney Borough Council.

In March 1946, Shapiro ran for the London County Council as a Whitechapel representative but did not win the election.

At the end of 1949, (i.e., shortly after the establishment of the People's Republic of China), at the invitation of the Central Committee of the Chinese Communist Party, the CPGB sent Shapiro to China to help with reporting about the new China to foreign readers. The CPGB sent a number of its members to China, including Alan Winnington and Douglas Springhall (known as Dave) and Janet Springhall. Shapiro was delayed in Moscow because the Soviet Union was suspicious about his intentions since he was Jewish. Thus, he arrived in Beijing in 1950, a little later than the others. David and Isabel Crook had gone to China in 1947 with an introduction from the CPGB to the Chinese Communist Party to study land reform and were subsequently invited by the CCP to stay and teach English.

Most foreigners stayed for only a few years. However, Shapiro chose to remain longer, thus joining other foreigners such as Israel and Elsie Epstein, and Sidney Rittenberg, who gained importance through influencing Western opinion by supporting the PRC.

=== 1950s ===
A CPGB party group was formed in the early 1950s with Shapiro as secretary. The group included David Crook and Alan Winnington. He became the main contact between the CPGB and the PRC government - until he broke with the CPGB during the Sino-Soviet split.

In 1951, Shapiro twice joined the Chinese People's Volunteers in Korea to report on the war. While there, he tried to persuade British POWs to "repent of their crimes and win them to the cause of peace". He also reported on the war for the Daily Worker. Shapiro's reporting contradicted the government's version and impacted public opinion in the UK. In 1955, a UK Ministry of Defense publication on the Korean War noted that Shapiro had individually interviewed men in the camps. His reputation was further damaged by allegations that he participated in prisoner interrogations, though this was never fully substantiated. His behavior was criticized in the UK and politicians raised the possibility of prosecuting Shapiro and others for treason. As a result, his passport was not renewed.

Shapiro served as an expert at the International News Bureau attached to the General Administration of the Press and at the Xinhua News Agency. He helped train journalists in the fledgling Communist government, particularly those senior journalists assigned to the Agency's overseas services. He also reported for the Daily Worker in London and was part of the team that translated Mao Zedong’s works into English. He helped polish Liu Shaoqi's How to Be a Good Communist and the documents on the Eighth National Congress of the Chinese Communist Party.

In 1958, Shapiro published a book titled Changing China. His aim was to explain the purpose behind the seeming contradictions in the expanding and fast-moving life of the new society.

=== 1960-1972 ===
In early 1960, a team of fourteen was assembled to translate a fourth volume of Mao’s Selected Works into English and to polish and finalize the outdated English translation of the first three volumes. The five foreigners on the team were Frank Coe, Solomon Adler, Sidney Rittenberg, Israel Epstein, and Shapiro. The Jewish expatriates in China, through journalism, teaching and translating, made a significant contribution to the PRC in its first thirty years by making it accessible to the world.

Shapiro had become a leading figure among China’s foreign friends and in 1965 called a meeting of the English-speaking foreign residents to show support for China after the US started bombing North Vietnam.

In January 1967, with official government permission, about a hundred foreigners formed the Bethune-Yanan Brigade, a 'rebel group' which met for rousing discussions of Maoist ideology. Shapiro was one of the Brigade’s leaders. David and Isabel Crook also joined the Brigade. In August, Shapiro, Sidney Rittenberg and Israel Epstein participated in an ultra-left plot that achieved nationwide notoriety. They took part in a conference that was later denounced as a "counter-revolutionary black meeting". On 22 August 1967, Shapiro was one of the expatriates who observed the ransacking of the British Mission in Peking by the Red Guards.

On 21 February 1968, Sidney Rittenberg, one of leaders of the Bethune-Yanan Brigade, was arrested and on 18 March 1968, two other leaders, Israel Epstein and Shapiroand their wives were arrested. They were held in Qincheng Prison, China's top security gaol. Many of those imprisoned were activists in the Brigade. They were no longer 'foreign comrades' but were now regarded as 'imperialist spies. Conditions in the prison were quite difficult – solitary confinement, no outside contacts, little to read, frequent interrogations.

Shapirol's wife and their two sons were imprisoned for ten months in a hotel room in the Qianmen area of Beijing. The Epstein and Rittenberg children were confined to the top floors of the same hotel. Access to their rooms was blocked off, and the windows were papered over and sealed, even during the sweltering summer months.

== Later years and death ==
One account of Shapiro's life states that he suffered a stroke sometime before 1974.

In January 1973, as the extremism of the Cultural Revolution declined, so the imprisoned foreigners were released and restored to good standing. Zhou Enlai apologized to all imprisoned foreign experts on behalf of the government and CCP. During incarceration, Shapiro developed Parkinson's disease and other ailments. It was speculated these were the result of severe conditions he endured during his 5-year imprisonment.

Despite his travails, Shapirol remained loyal to Chinese communism. He never told his family about his prison experiences. In 1977, he returned to work for the Xinhua News Agency.

Shapiro died on 29 September 1986 of heart failure, aged 76. A day later, he was posthumously conferred the title of 'Honorary Citizen of China' by the Beijing Municipal People's Government. Deng Xiaoping hailed him as "a staunch international soldier and sincere friend of the Chinese people". In reporting Shapiro's death, at least one British newspaper repeated the information about his activities in Korea.

After Shapiro's death, his brother Jack established a prize for journalism students in his name. In 2000, fifteen editors and journalists from Xinhua News Agency received the Shapiro Prize from the Foundation in Beijing. This Foundation no longer exists.

== Personal life ==
In October 1941, Shapiro married Eileen Murray (daughter of Sir John Murray Murray, Chief Justice of Southern Rhodesia 1955–1961). They had one daughter Sallie (born 1942), then divorced in 1945.

In August 1952, he married Liu Jinghe, born in Shanghai in 1911. She graduated from the Department of Biochemistry at Jinling Women's University in Nanjing in 1932, and from the Senior Nursing School of Peking Union Medical College in 1936. She obtained a master's degree from the University of Minnesota and a doctorate in child development from Columbia University. After returning to China in 1950, she worked in the Institute of Psychology of the Chinese Academy of Sciences. She was a member of the Chinese Communist Party, a representative of the National People's Congress and an executive committee member of the All-China Women's Federation. She was one of the academic leaders of the psychology of child development and educational psychology in China. She died on 12 December 2004.

Shaprio and Liu had two boys, Xiao Mai (also called Solomon, 1954–2020) and Xiao Di (also called Roger, born 1958). In August 1981, Solomon married Xiao Yang (also called ShaSha). Roger has never married.

== Publications ==
- Michael Shapiro (1935). Heartbreak Homes: An Indictment of the National Government's Housing Policy. London: Communist Party of Great Britain.
- Michael Best (1938). The Tenant's Guide London. Labour Research Department.
- Michael Best (1940). War Injury and War Damage: Your Rights to Compensation. London: Federation of Tenants’ and Residents’ Research Associations, Labor Research Department.
- Michael Shapiro (1944). How to speed up the repairs: why the delay? why are empty houses still not requisitioned? who is to blame? what can be done about it?. London: Communist Party of Great Britain.
- Michael Shapiro (1958). Changing China. London: Lawrence & Wishart.
