= Shubin (disambiguation) =

Shubin is a Russian surname.

Shubin may also refer to:

- Shubin (ghost), mythological Ukrainian spirit or ghost found in mines
- Shubin (given name), Chinese given name
