= Shubin =

Shubin (Russian: Шубин), or Shubina (feminine; Шубина), is a Russian surname derived from the Russian word шуба shuba meaning fur coat. Notable people with the surname include:

- Alexander Shubin (figure skater) (born 1983), Russian figure skater
- Aleksandr Shubin (historian), (born 1965), Russian historian and politician
- Ekaterina Shubina (fl. 2000s), Canoer at the 2006 Asian Games
- Fedot Shubin (1740–1805), Russian sculptor
- Galina Shubina (1902–1980), Russian poster and graphics artist
- Igor Shubin (born 1958), Russian politician
- Joel Shubin (died 1942), Russian American writer
- Kirill Shubin (born 2003), Russian chess master
- Lester Shubin (1925–2009), American inventor
- Lyudmila Shubina (born 1948), Soviet Azerbaijani handball player
- Margarita Shubina (born 1966), Soviet and Russian actress and director
- Mariya Shubina (1930–2025), Soviet sprint canoeist
- Mikhail Shubin (mathematician) (1944–2020), Russian-American mathematician
- Mikhail Shubin (triathlete) (born 1988), Russian triathlete
- Murray J. Shubin (1917–1956), American flying ace during World War II
- Neil Shubin (born 1960), American biologist and science writer
- Nikolay Shubin (born 1956), Georgian-born Russian serial killer
- Oleksiy Shubin (1975–2025), Ukrainian footballer
- Steve Shubin (fl. 1997), founder and CEO of Interactive Life Forms, an adult sex toy company
- Tatiana Shubin (fl. 1978), Soviet American mathematician
- Yelena Shubina (born 1974), Russian Swimmer
