= Isabel Crook =

Canadian anthropologist and educator (1915–2023)

- Crook in 1940
- Born: Isabel Brown; 15 December 1915; Chengdu, Sichuan, China
- Died: 20 August 2023 (aged 107); Beijing, China
- Education: University of Toronto; London School of Economics
- Occupations: Professor, anthropologist
- Spouse: David Crook (m. 1942; died 2000)
- Children: 3
- Relatives: Homer G. Brown (father); Muriel J. Hockey (mother)
- Writing career
- Language: English; Chinese
- Notable works: Xinglong Chang: Field Notes of a Village Called Prosperity 1940–1942; Revolution in a Chinese Village: Ten Mile Inn
- Notable awards: Medal of Friendship (2019)

Chinese name
- Traditional Chinese: 饒素梅
- Simplified Chinese: 饶素梅
Transcriptions
Standard Mandarin
- Hanyu Pinyin: Ráo Sùméi

Isabel Crook (née Brown Chinese: 饶素梅; pinyin: Ráo Sùméi; 15 December 1915 – 20 August 2023) was a Canadian-British anthropologist, political prisoner, and professor at Beijing Foreign Studies University. A widely acclaimed pioneer of English language education in PR China and a witness to the profound transformations in modern Chinese history, Crook conducted anthropological studies in China and played an instrumental role in foreign language education in China.

== Early life ==
Isabel Brown was born on 15 December 1915, in Chengdu, Sichuan, to Canadian missionaries Homer and Muriel Brown. Homer was the dean of the Education Faculty at West China Union University. Muriel set up Montessori Schools in China and served on the board of the YWCA. Isabel's sisters, Muriel and Julia, were also born in Chengdu and all three attended the city's Canadian School.

As a child, Isabel Brown became interested in anthropology and the many ethnic minorities in China. In 1939, at the age of 23, she graduated from Victoria College at the University of Toronto.

== Later life, revolution and career ==
After graduating, Brown returned to China and set out for western Sichuan with a Chinese colleague to study the Yi people (known then as Lolos) who followed a shamanic religion and lived in a caste-based society heavily reliant on slavery. The next year, the Chinese National Christian Council hired Brown to survey impoverished rural families in a village outside of Chongqing, which later became the basis for her publication Prosperity's Predicament.

In the early 1940s, Brown met David Crook, a British communist who had spied for the NKVD in both Spain and Shanghai, and married him in 1942. In 1947, they went to Ten Mile Inn, Shidong Township, Hebei Province, to observe and study the Chinese Land Reform. Six months later, they accepted an invitation from CPC leaders to teach at a new foreign affairs school, the forerunner of today's Beijing Foreign Studies University (BFSU).

As a teacher at BFSU, Crook laid the foundation for foreign language education in China. During the Cultural Revolution, David was imprisoned from 1967 to 1973 in Qincheng prison, while she was confined to the BFSU campus. Isabel said she understood and forgave her captors.

Crook retired from teaching in 1981 and resumed her research studies as an anthropologist. Her study of the village in Sichuan, which she, Xiji Yu and others had begun in the 1940s, was continued in the 90s and then eventually published as Prosperity's Predicament: Identity, Reform, and Resistance in Rural Wartime China in 2013.

In June 2019, she became an honorary citizen of Bishan District, Chongqing.

The Crooks had three sons. She died in Beijing on 20 August 2023, at age 107.

== Works ==
- Xinglong Chang: Field Notes of a Village Called Prosperity 1940–1942 (兴隆场：抗战时期四川农民生活调查（1940–1942）) ISBN 978-7-101-08034-6
- Crook, Isabel and David. 1959. Revolution in a Chinese Village: Ten Mile Inn (十里店：中国一个村庄的革命). London, Boston and Henley: Routledge and Kegan Paul ISBN 978-1-134-68555-4
- Crook, Isabel and David. 1966. The First Years of Yangyi Commune. London, Boston and Henley: Routledge and Kegan Paul. ISBN 0-7100-3463-6
- Crook, Isabel and David. 1979. Ten Mile Inn: Mass Movement in a Chinese Village. New York: Pantheon Books. ISBN 0-394-41178-1
- Gilmartin, Christina K; Crook, Isabel; Yu, Xiji (2013). Prosperity's Predicament: Identity, Reform and Resistance in Wartime China. Rowman & Littlefield. ISBN 978-1-4422-5277-6

== Awards ==
Crook was awarded a Doctor of Letters by Victoria University, Toronto in 2018.

On 30 September 2019, Crook was awarded the Medal of Friendship by Chinese president Xi Jinping.

== Sources ==
- "A Story of Rural Wartime China, 70 Years in the Making". Wall Street Journal China Real Time blog. 13 December 2013.
- Crook, David (1990). "The Autobiography of David Crook – The Ballad of Beijing Gaol (1967–73)". davidcrook.net.
- Crook, Isabel (29 April 2018). "Parents 1915, Chengdu – Isabel Crook". Archived from the original on 29 April 2018.
- Crook, Isabel (2018). "Western Sichuan Tibetan area 1938". Archived from the original on 29 April 2018.
- Gittings, John (21 August 2023). "Isabel Crook obituary". The Guardian.
- "Isabel Crook: A life-long friend of China". cri.cn. 26 September 2019.
- "Isabel Crook: Founder of New China's Foreign Language Education". www.fmprc.gov.cn. 30 August 2022.
- "Isabel Crook: Live with China one century". China Daily. 7 July 2017.
- "Michael Crook and his mother Isabel from Beijing in Conversation with Dr Frances Wood, SACU Vice President". Society for Anglo-Chinese Understanding (SACU).
- Zeng Qinglong (18 September 2019). 国家最高荣誉！璧山荣誉市民伊莎白·柯鲁克被授予"友谊勋章". Sohu (in Chinese).
- Crook, Isabel; Yu, Xiji; Hershatter, Gail (2013). Prosperity's predicament: identity, reform, and resistance in rural wartime China (First published ed.). Lanham Bouöder New York Toronto Plymouth, UK: Rowman & Littlefield. ISBN 978-1-4422-5277-6.
- Griffiths, James (22 August 2023). "Isabel Crook, Canadian anthropologist awarded friendship medal by China's Xi Jinping, dies aged 107". The Globe and Mail.
- "Honorary Degrees Conferred by Senate". vicu.utoronto.ca. Victoria University, Toronto.
