= Nanqiao =

Nanqiao (simplified Chinese: 南桥; traditional Chinese: 南橋; pinyin: Nánqiáo) may refer to the following places in China.

- Nanqiao, Liling, former town in Liling, Zhuzhou, Hunan
- Nanqiao, Shanghai, town in Fengxian District, Shanghai
- Nanqiao, Xingtang County, town in Xingtang County, Shijiazhuang, Hebei
- Nanqiao District, district in Chuzhou, Anhui, China
