= Mikhail Shubin =

Mikhail Shubin may refer to:

- Mikhail Shubin (mathematician) (1944–2020), professor at Northeastern University
- Mikhail Shubin (triathlete) (born 1988), Russian triathlete
