= Anna Louise Strong =

American journalist (1885–1970)

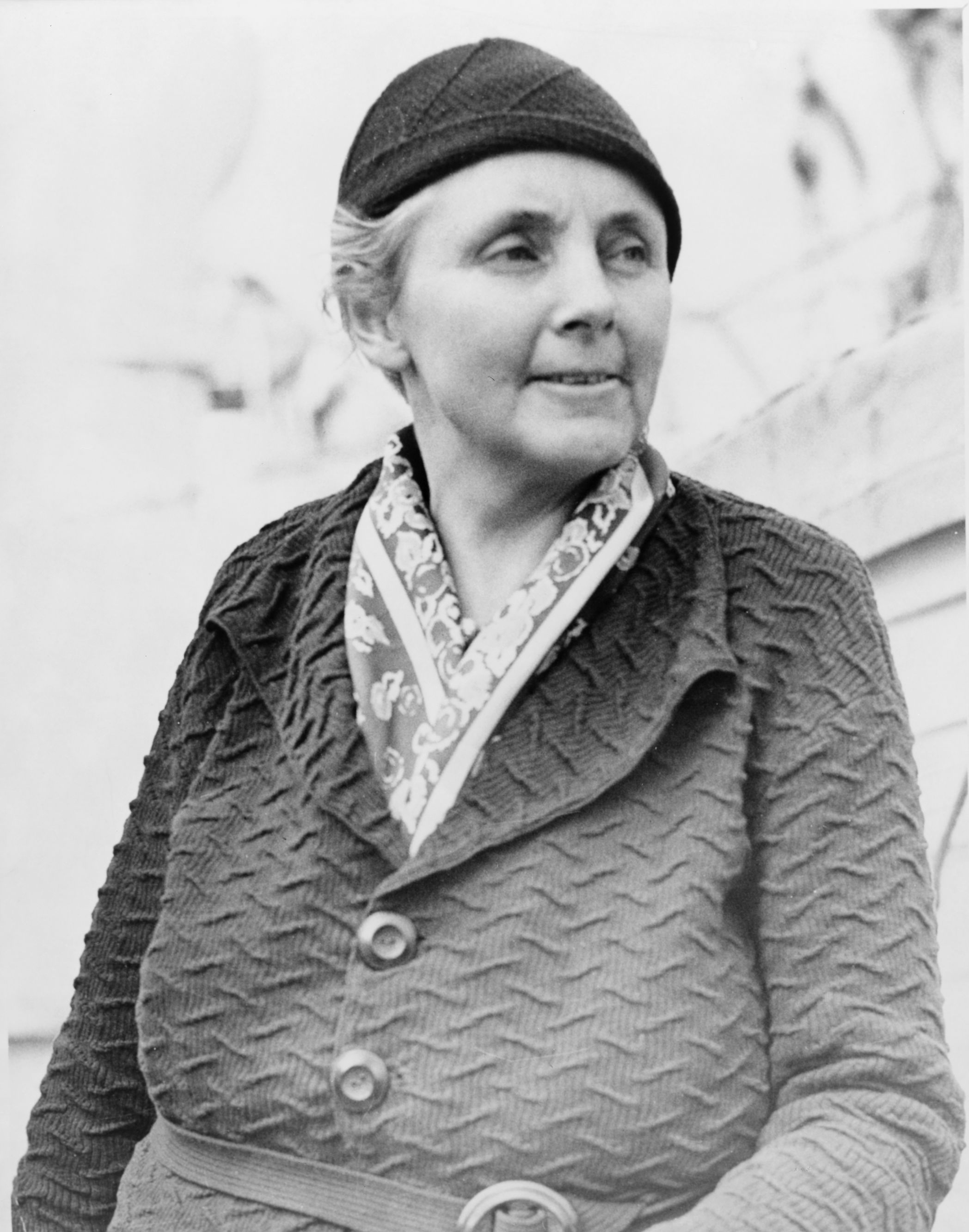
- Strong in Moscow, 1937
- Born: November 24, 1885; Friend, Nebraska, U.S.
- Died: March 29, 1970 (aged 84); Beijing, China
- Burial place: Babaoshan Revolutionary Cemetery
- Education: Bryn Mawr College; Oberlin College; University of Chicago
- Spouse: Joel Shubin (1931–1942)

Anna Louise Strong (November 24, 1885 – March 29, 1970) was an American journalist and activist, best known for her reporting on and support for communist movements in the Soviet Union and the People's Republic of China. She wrote over 30 books and varied articles.

== Biography ==
=== Early years ===
Strong was born on November 24, 1885, in a "two-room parsonage" in Friend, Nebraska, the "Middle West," to parents who were middle class liberals active in missionary work and in the Congregational Church. She lived with her family from 1887 to 1891 in Mount Vernon, Ohio, and in Cincinnati beginning in 1891. Her father, Sydney Dix Strong, was a Social Gospel minister in the Congregational Church, active in missionary work, and a dedicated pacifist. Strong worked quickly through grammar and high school, and then studied languages in Europe.

She first attended Pennsylvania's Bryn Mawr College from 1903 to 1904, then graduated from Oberlin College in Ohio in 1905 where she later returned to speak many times. In 1908, at the age of 23, she finished her education and received a PhD in philosophy from the University of Chicago with a thesis later published as The Social Psychology of Prayer. Being an advocate for child welfare while she worked for the United States Office of Education, joining the National Child Labor Committee around the same time, she organized an exhibit and toured it extensively throughout the United States and abroad. When she brought it to Seattle, in May 1914, 6,000 people came to visit it every day, culminating with an audience, on May 31, of 40,000 people.

At this point, Strong was already convinced that capitalism was responsible for poverty and the suffering of the working class. She was 30 years old when she returned to Seattle to live with her father, then pastor of Queen Anne Congregational Church. Living with her father from 1916 to 1921, she favored the political climate there, which was pro-labor and progressive, with "radicalizing events" like the Seattle General Strike and Everett massacre.

Strong also enjoyed mountain climbing. She organized cooperative summer camps in the Cascades and led climbing parties up Mount Rainier, leading to the Washington Alpine Club, formed in 1916.

=== Political career ===
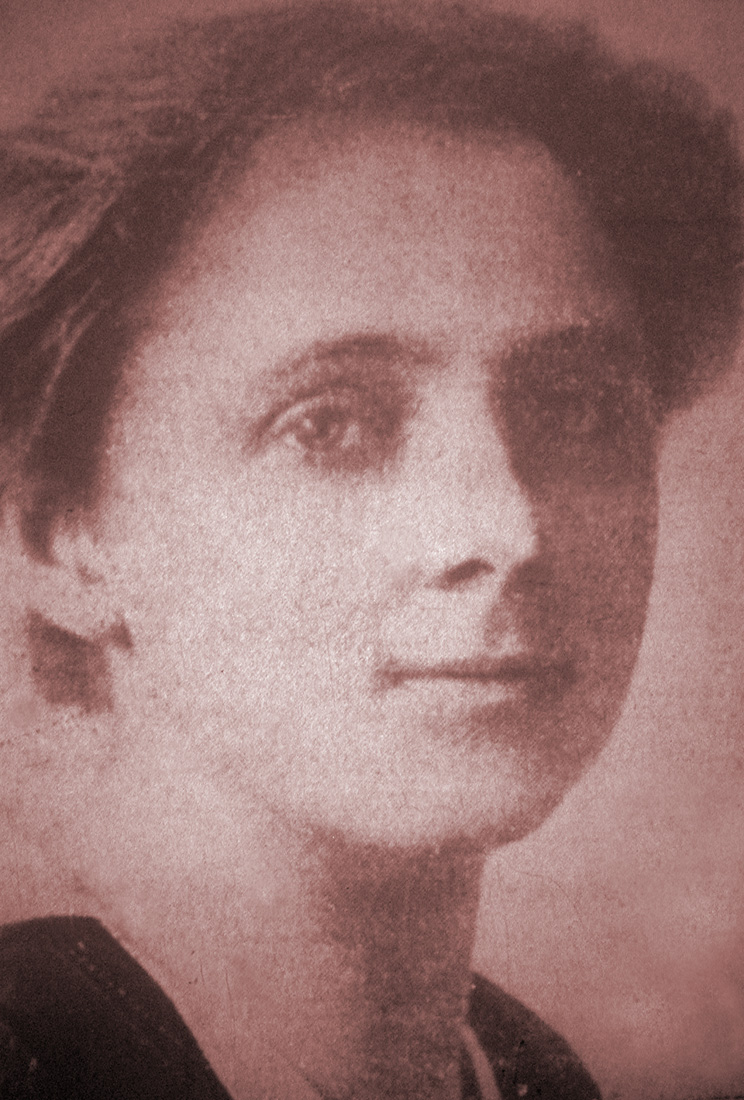
Anna Louise Strong at the time of her recall from the Seattle School Board in 1918.

In 1916, Strong ran for the Seattle School Board and won easily due to the support she garnered from women's groups and organized labor and to her work on child welfare. She was the only female board member. She argued that the public schools should offer social service programs for underprivileged children, with these schools serving as community centers, but other members wanted to "devote meetings to mundane matters like plumbing fixtures."

The year she was elected to the Seattle School Board, the Everett massacre happened. The New York Evening Post hired her as a stringer to report on the conflict between armed guards, hired by Everett mill owners, and the Industrial Workers of the World (or "Wobblies"). Quickly dropping her neutrality, she soon became a dedicated spokesperson for workers' rights.

Strong's endorsement of left-wing causes set her apart from her colleagues on the school board. She opposed war as a pacifist. When the United States entered World War I in April 1917, she spoke out against the draft. On one hand, the Parent-Teacher Association and women's clubs joined her in opposing military training in the schools, but the former military veterans of the Spanish–American War, the Seattle Minute Men, took a jingoistic tone, branding her as "unpatriotic." The same year, she wrote a letter to the Department of Justice, saying

...it is quite commonly felt in this vicinity that persons with personal grudges need only call in the Department of Justice and lodge complaint, in order to make life miserable for the person they complain against...it has become increasingly evident, however, at least in this vicinity, that the activities of the Department of Justice are doing more than any other one thing to create distrust, suspicion, and dissension among the American people...Wild accusations and attempts to injure persons and organizations who cannot be prosecuted because of lack of evidence does not tend to create confidence in the government...it is my hope that somewhere in your department I may reach some person who sincerely desires to create within this country the unity of democratic loyalty, rather than the hidden disunion of fear

The pacifist stance of the Wobblies led to mass arrests at the Seattle office where Louise Olivereau was a typist. Olivereau had been mailing mimeographed circulars to draftees urging them to become conscientious objectors. In 1918, Strong stood by Olivereau's side in the courtroom as she was found guilty of sedition and sent to prison.

After this, Strong's fellow school board members were quick to launch a recall campaign against her due to her association with the IWW, and won by a narrow margin. She appeared at their next meeting to argue that they must appoint a woman as her successor. Her former colleagues acceded to her request, but they made it clear that they wanted a mainstream, patriotic representative, a mother with children in the schools. They replaced Anna Louise Strong with Evangeline C. Harper, a prominent country club woman in 1918. As a result, Strong went "elsewhere in search of socialism in practice" with her search bringing her first to the Soviet Union where she stayed from 1921 to 1940 for part of the year, returning to the U.S. "for a lecture tour, usually between January and April."

=== Journalistic career ===
==== Early career ====
Strong became openly associated with the Seattle's labor-owned daily newspaper, The Union Record, writing forceful pro-labor articles and promoting the new Soviet government. On February 6, 1919, two days before the beginning of the Seattle General Strike of 1919, she proclaimed in her famous editorial: "We are undertaking the most tremendous move ever made by labor in this country, a move which will lead—NO ONE KNOWS WHERE!" The strike shut down the city for four days and then ended peacefully and with its goals still unattained.

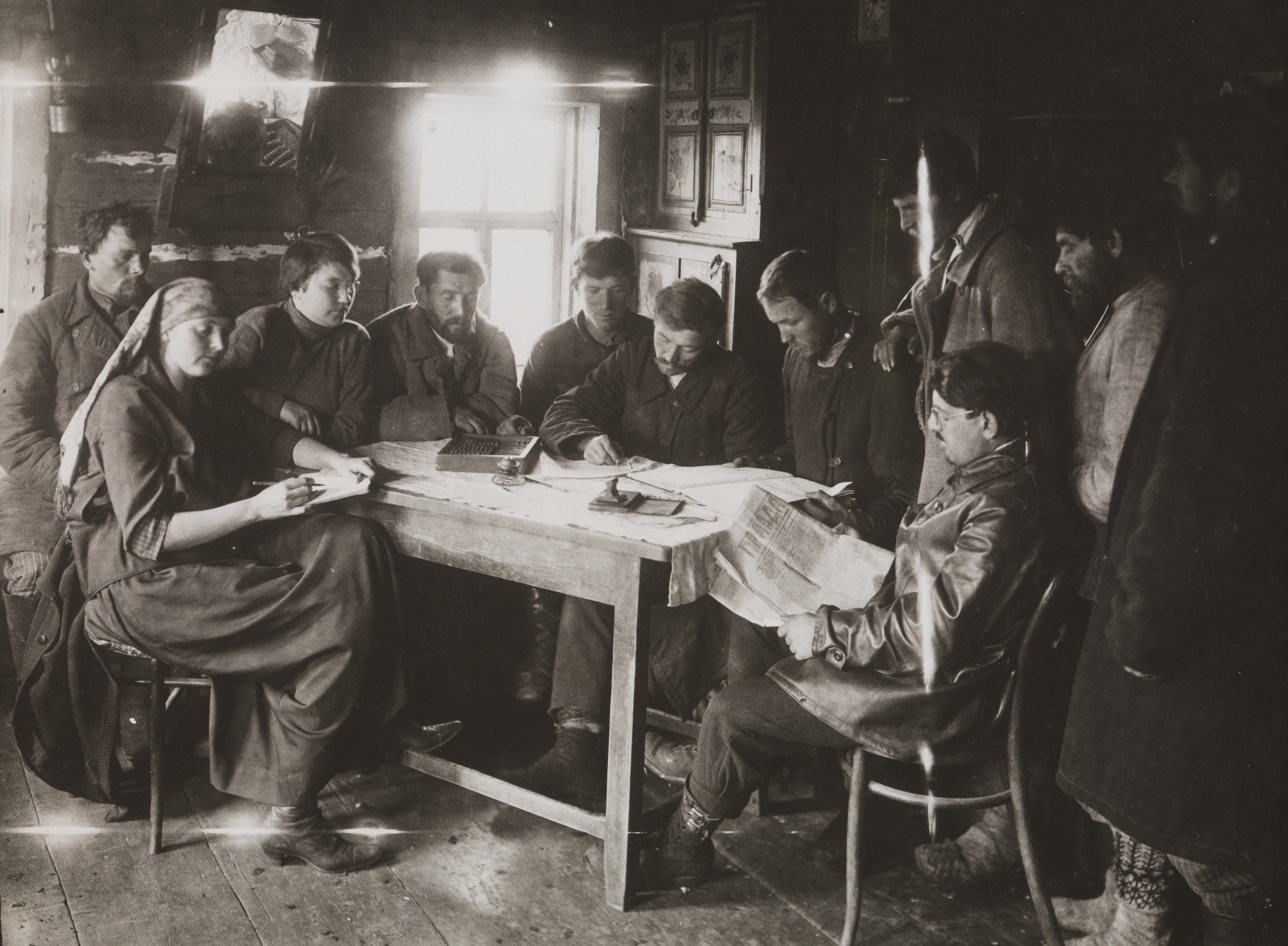
1921 in Samara, Russia, for the American Friends Service Committee.

==== Move to Russia ====
At a loss as to what to do she took her friend Lincoln Steffens' advice and in 1921 traveled to Poland and Russia serving as a correspondent for the American Friends Service Committee. The purpose of going was to provide the first foreign relief to the Volga famine victims. After a year of that, she was named Moscow correspondent for the International News Service. Strong drew many observations while in Europe which inspired her to write. Some of her works are The First Time in History (preface by Leon Trotsky) (1924), and Children of Revolution (1925).

After remaining in the area for several years, Strong grew to become an enthusiastic supporter of socialism in the newly formed Soviet Union, supporting herself as a foreign correspondent for varying "radical American newspapers" and others such as The Nation. In 1925, during the era of the New Economic Policy in the USSR, she returned to the United States to arouse interest among businessmen in industrial investment and development in the Soviet Union. During this time Strong also lectured widely and became well known as an authority on "soft news" (e.g. How to get an apartment) about the USSR. As she continued to "wave the banner for the needy and downtrodden" wherever there was a revolution there was "Ms. Strong," and she became further convinced by what she experienced that socialism might be the answer to problems in the world.

==== Travels in Asia ====
In the late 1920s, Strong traveled in China and other parts of Asia. She became friends with Soong Ching-ling and Zhou Enlai. As always, her travels led to books including China's Millions (1928) and Red Star in Samarkand (1929). She visited China in 1925, meeting with Feng Yuxiang, and again in 1927, witnessing the failure of the First United Front between the Chinese Communist Party (CCP) and Kuomintang (KMT).

==== Return to Moscow, Soviet writer ====
In 1930, she returned to Moscow and helped found Moscow News, the first English-language newspaper in the city. She was managing editor for a year and then became a featured writer. In 1931 she married fellow socialist and journalist Joel Shubin, and they remained married until his death in 1942. While Shubin often accompanied Strong during her return trips to the United States, the two were often separated due to work commitments. According to Rewi Alley's account, Strong later said: "perhaps we married because we were both so doggone lonely ... but we were very happy."

While living in the Soviet Union, she became more enthused with the Soviet government and wrote many books praising it. They include: The Soviets Conquer Wheat (1931), an updated version of China's Millions: The Revolutionary Struggles from 1927 to 1935 (1935), the best-selling autobiographical I Change Worlds: the Remaking of an American (1935), This Soviet World (1936), and The Soviet Constitution (1937). She also wrote several articles for The American Mercury praising Soviet life.

==== Return to America ====
In 1936, she returned once again to the United States. Quietly and privately distressed with developments in the USSR (The "Great Purges"), she continued to write for leading periodicals, including The Atlantic Monthly, Harper's, The Nation and Asia.

==== Further travels ====
A visit to Spain resulted in Spain in Arms (1937). In 1938, Strong visited the Eighth Route Army Headquarters in Shanxi, China, meeting with Zhu De, Peng Dehuai, He Long, Liu Bocheng, and Lin Biao. Visits to China, including anti-Japanese "base areas," lead to her book One Fifth of Mankind (1938). In 1940, she published My Native Land, the same year that she went to China and met Zhou Enlai several times. The following year, she exposed the plot by Chiang Kai-Shek to divide the "united front" against Japan in the 15-page article, "The Kuomintang-communist crisis in China; a first-hand account of one of the most critical periods in Far Eastern history" published in March. Other books include The Soviets Expected It (1941); the novel Wild River (1943), set in Russia; Peoples of the U.S.S.R. (1944), I Saw the New Poland (1946) (based on her reporting from Poland as she accompanied the occupying Red Army); and three books on the success of the early CCP in the Chinese Civil War. In her book The Soviets Expected It, Strong wrote that "the unbroken rise of Stalin's prestige for twenty years both within the Soviet Union and beyond its borders is really worth attention by students of politics."

While in the USSR, she traveled throughout the huge nation, including Ukraine, Kuznetsk, Stalingrad, Kiev, Siberia, Central Asia, Uzbekistan, and many more. She also traveled into Poland, Germany, and Britain. While in the Soviet Union, Strong met with Joseph Stalin, Vyacheslav Molotov, and many other Soviet officials. She also interviewed farmers, pedestrians, and factory workers. She wrote articles for newspapers and magazines, along with pamphlets as well, gaining "many friends and to become very popular throughout the world." At the same time, she created "suspicion regarding her political loyalties" among the Soviets and the FBI who gained a large file on Strong herself. Through all this, she stayed committed to the Soviet political project, defending the USSR from anti-communism, but favoring the Chinese more than the Soviets as time went on, especially after the Soviets expelled her.

==== Break with USSR ====
In World War II, when the Red Army began its advance against Nazi Germany, Strong stayed in the rear following the soldiers through Warsaw, Łódź and Gdańsk. Her overtly pro-Chinese Communist sympathies, which had been fostered by her visits to China in 1925 and until 1947 in which she interviewed Chinese Communist leaders like Mao Zedong, may have led to her "arrest, imprisonment and expulsion" from the USSR in 1949, reportedly claiming she was an "American spy," a charge which reportedly was repeated years later, in 1953, by the Soviet newspaper Izvestia.

Strong became a celebrity in China because of her 1946 interview of Mao, in which Mao stated that American people should unite with the peoples of all countries to oppose U.S. reactionaries and their allies.

After this, she was cut off from the USSR, shunned by Communists in the United States, and denied a passport by the U.S. government, settling in California where she wrote, lectured, and "invested in real estate." During the 1950s, she lived in a Tower House in Angelino Heights, "Red Gulch".

"I was 72 then, living in Los Angeles where I had more friends than anywhere else. I owned a town house, a summer lodge in the mountains, a winter cabin in the desert, a car and a driver's license to take myself about. I had income to live on for life. Should I go to China now?"

==== Cleared of Soviet charges, final move to China ====
In 1955, she was finally cleared of Soviet charges against her, which the CIA thought was a "gesture to the Chinese Communists." By 1958 her passport was restored, after a U.S. Supreme Court decision prohibiting the denial of passports to communists, and she immediately went back to China, where she remained until her death. She was one of the only Westerners to gain "the admiration of Mao Tse-tung [Mao Zedong]".

==== Final years in China ====
Strong met W.E.B. Du Bois, who visited China during the Great Leap Forward in the late 1950s, with a photograph of Mao Zedong, Anna Louise Strong, and W.E.B. Du Bois taken on one of Du Bois's trips in circa 1959.

Strong wrote two books supportive of the central government's policies in Tibet. In Tibetan Interviews, she criticized the Tibetan rebels for violating the agreement between the Dalai Lama and China. Strong also criticized the United States' Tibet policy, writing that Secretary of State Christian Chester had gone "all out in a moral crusade for 'the indomitable spirit of man," which in this case meant "the serf-owners' insistence on keeping their serfs." Strong visited Tibet in 1959 and in mid-1960 published When Serfs Stood Up in Tibet, discussing the annexation of Tibet by the People's Republic of China and criticizing individuals such as Allen Dulles, calling him "a man bound by dull words."

In 1961, Strong visited North Vietnam and Laos. She wrote Cash and Violence in Laos and Vietnam, which described the United States as an imperialist country and criticized its increasing presence in Laos, Cambodia, and South Vietnam with military funding. In the book, Strong praised China's influence in the region and wrote that China "will get further with gifts of rice-transplanters and textile factories than Washington with bombs."

From 1962 to 1966, Strong published Letters from China in which she and other U.S. expats in China praised Chinese socialism. She began the newsletter at the suggestion of Zhou Enlai. The contents of Strong's Letters were drawn from interviews of China's leaders and their speeches, her own experiences in China, Chinese news reports, and writings from other foreigners working in China, such as Israel Epstein and Sidney Rittenberg.

Partly from fear of losing her passport should she return to the US, she settled permanently in China until her death. During that time she fostered a close relationship with Zhou Enlai and was on familiar terms with Mao Zedong. It was in an interview with her in August 1946, Mao made his famous statement that the United States' atomic bombs and American reactionaries were paper tigers.

Two years after that, she made a keynote speech on China's realities and tried to change the stance of the U.S. government in backing the Chinese nationalists. Strong lived in the old Italian Legation in Beijing which had been converted into flats for the leading "foreign friends". They were allocated on the "bleak basis" of seniority; New Zealand civil servant Gerald Hensley recalled that when he visited Rewi Alley in 1973, Alley was living in the best downstairs front apartment which had been allocated to Strong until she died, at which time Alley moved into it and everyone else moved on one place. Through all of this, she became "disaffected with political systems and people" but did not lose her zeal for justice, continuing to write, with Chinese publishers republishing "much of her writing as a Works set." She was not stopped, even by her old age, in her dedication to "Marxist doctrine," especially in China and across the world, writing emotional and colorful accounts that were very popular.

By 1966, Strong had become an "honorary member of the Red Guards" who returned to the Soviet Union from time to time. In the later part of her life, Strong was "honored and revered by the Chinese," despite reports in the Toronto Star that the Red Guards were calling her an "imperialist agent," and even remained "in the good graces of the Chinese through the cultural revolution" with Chinese leaders considering her "their unofficial spokesperson to the English speaking world."

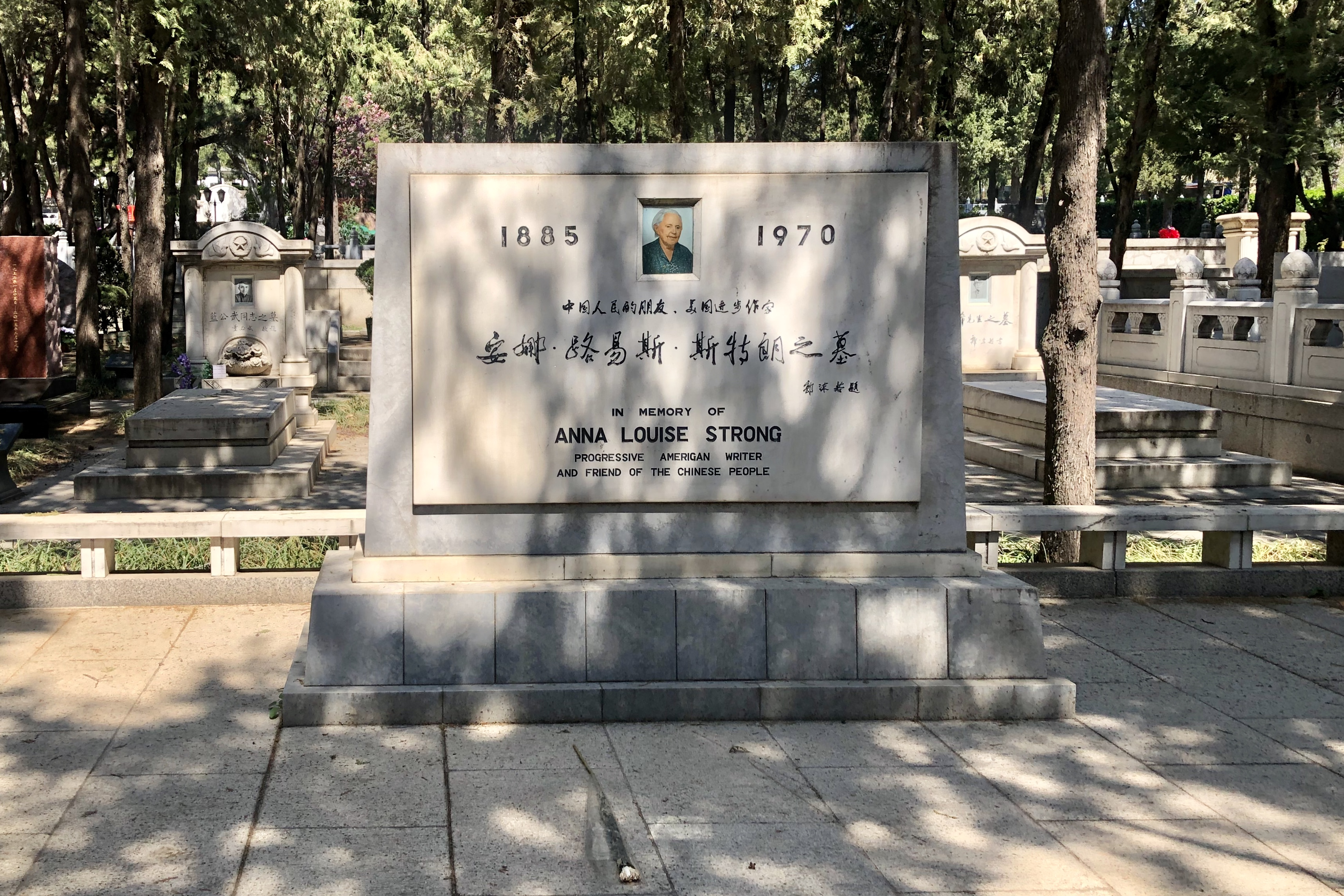
Anna Louise Strong was buried at Babaoshan Revolutionary Cemetery

By 1970 she was staying at a hospital in Beijing (then Peking), where she had been pulling out her "intravenous tubes and had refused to eat and take medication". She was reportedly visited by Premier Zhou Enlai, Guo Moruo, and other high government officials. Zhou Enlai had encouraged her to cooperate with the doctors in the hospital because "you have important things to do for us and the rest of the world". Strong died of a heart attack on March 29, 1970. Guo delivered a eulogy for her, and Mao, Zhou, Lin Biao, and other high level leadership sent wreaths to her memorial.

=== Legacy ===
Strong was one of the first English-language writers to disseminate Mao Zedong Thought and the history and strategy of the CCP.

Strong's papers reside at the Libraries Special Collections at the University of Washington in Seattle. Within the papers of Eleanor Roosevelt are "reports from Anna Louise Strong during and after her visits to Russia and China" although this does not mean there was any relationship, professionally, between Strong and Eleanor.

== Selected works ==
=== Fiction ===
- Storm Songs and Fables. Chicago: Langston Press. 1904.
- King's Palace. Illinois: Oak Leaves. 1908. (one-act play)
- The Song of the City. Oak Park, Illinois: Oak Leaves Company. c. 1908.
- Ragged Verse. Seattle: Piggott-Washington. 1937. (poems, by Anise)
- Wild River. Boston: Little, Brown. 1943. (novel, set in Ukraine)
- God and the Millionaires. Montrose, California: Middlebury College. 1951. (poems, by Anise)

=== Religious tracts and social work ===
- Biographical Studies in the Bible. Pilgrim Press. 1906. (co-author with Sydney Strong, her father)
- Bible Hero Classics. Hope Publishing Company. 1906–1908. (co-author with Sydney Strong, her father), including The story of Jacob in words of the Scripture (found in Genesis) and likely the Song of the City.
- The Psychology of Prayer. Chicago: University of Chicago Press. 1909.
- Boys and Girls of the Bible. Chicago: Howard-Severance. 1911.
- On the Eve of Home Rule: snapshots of Ireland in the momentous summer of 1914. Austin: O'Connell Press. 1914.
- Child-welfare Exhibits: Types and Preparation. U.S. Children's bureau. Miscellaneous series; no. 4. Bureau publication, no. 14. Washington: Government Printing Office. 1915.

=== Reportage and travelogues ===
- The First Time in History: Two Years of Russia's New Life. New York: Boni & Liveright. 1924. (with preface by Leon Trotsky), also on Internet Archive.
- Children of Revolution; story of the John Reed Children's Colony on the Volga, which is as well a story of the whole great structure of Russia. Seattle: Sydney Strong. 1925.
- Modern Farming – Soviet Style: The Revolution in the Russian Village. Boston: International Publishers. 1930., also available at HathiTrust.
- The Road to the Grey Pamir. Boston: Little, Brown & Company. 1931.
- The Soviets Conquer Wheat. New York: Henry Holt and Company. 1931.
- China's millions: the revolutionary struggles from 1927 to 1935. New York: Knight Publishing Company. 1935.
- This Soviet World. New York: Henry Holt and Company. 1936.
- Spain in Arms, 1937. New York: Henry Holt and Company. 1937.
- The New Soviet Constitution: A Study in Socialist Democracy. New York: Henry Holt and Company. 1937.
- One-fifth of mankind. Modern age books; no. 69. New York: Modern Age Books. 1938.
- Lithuania's New Way. Boston: Lawrence and Wishart. 1941.
- The Soviets Expected It. New York: The Dial Press. 1942.
- Soviet Farmers. New York: National Council of American-Soviet Friendship. 1944.
- Peoples of the USSR. New York: The Macmillan Company. 1944., second printing in 1945.
- I Saw The New Poland. Boston: Little, Brown, and Company. 1946.
- Tomorrow's China. New York: Committee for a Democratic Far Eastern Policy. 1948.
- Inside North Korea: an Eye-witness Report. Montrose, California. 1949.
- The Stalin Era. New York: Mainstream Publishers. 1956., also in a PDF format.
- The rise of the Chinese people's communes. Peking: New World Press. 1959.
- Tibetan interviews. Peking: New World Press. 1959.
- When Serfs Stood Up in Tibet. Peking: New World Press. 1960., also on Internet Archive
- Cash and Violence in Laos and Vietnam. New York: Mainstream Publishers. 1962.
- Letters from China, Numbers 1–10. Peking: New World Press. 1963.

=== Autobiography ===
- I Change Worlds: the Remaking of an American. New York: Holt, Rinehart and Winston. 1935. (republished 1979 by The Seal Press, Seattle—the Introduction by Barbara Wilson contains the statement: "She left behind a second volume of autobiography which, so far, has remained in China.")

== See also ==
- Agnes Smedley
- Edgar Snow
- Mikhail Borodin
- Rewi Alley
- Helen Foster Snow
- Tracy B. Strong
- Dorise Nielsen

== Notes ==
- See Judith Nies. Nine Women: Portraits from the American Radical Tradition, University of California Press, 2002, ISBN 0-520-22965-7 p. 166
