= Zhili =

Zhili may refer to:

- Zhili (province), a historical province of the Qing dynasty and the Republic of China (1912–1949)
- Zhili clique, a Chinese faction from 1920 to 1928
- Zhili Army (Fengtian clique), a Chinese warlord military unit from 1924 to 1928
- Zhili Township, a township-level division of Xingtang County, Shijiazhuang, Hebei, China
