= Shangbei =

Coordinates: 38°29′00″N 114°27′33″E

Shangbei 上碑镇
- Town

Chinese transcription(s)
- Interactive map of Shangbei
- Country: China
- Province: Hebei
- Prefecture: Shijiazhuang
- County: Xingtang County
- Time zone: UTC+8 (China Standard Time)

Shangbei (Chinese: 上碑镇) is a township-level division of Xingtang County, Shijiazhuang, Hebei, China.

== See also ==
- List of township-level divisions of Hebei
