= Dayneko =

Dayneko is a surname. Notable people with the surname include:

- Ken Daneyko (born 1964), Canadian ice hockey player
- Viktoria Dayneko (born 1987), Russian singer, songwriter and actress

== See also ==
- Deyneka
