= Koutou =

Koutou 口头镇
- Town
- Location in Hebei
- Coordinates: 38°36′22″N 114°23′13″E
- Country: People's Republic of China
- Province: Hebei
- Prefecture-level city: Shijiazhuang
- County: Xingtang
- Village-level divisions: 41 villages
- Elevation: 185 m (607 ft)
- Time zone: UTC+8 (China Standard)
- Area code: 0311

Koutou (simplified Chinese: 口头; traditional Chinese: 口頭; pinyin: Kǒutóu) is a town of Xingtang County in western Hebei province, China, located 24 kilometres (15 mi) northwest of the county seat. As of 2011, it has 41 villages under its administration.

== See also ==
- List of township-level divisions of Hebei
