= Galina Shubina =

Russian painter

Galina Konstantinovna Shubina (Russian: Галина Константиновна Шубина; 1902–1980), was a Soviet poster and graphics artist.

== Biography ==
Galina Shubina was born in Voronezh in 1902. From the age of 13 she studied in the watercolour class at the local art school. After graduating from the Academy Galina moved to Moscow in 1929. The same year she becomes a member of the Artists' Union. Galina's husband Soslanbek Tavasiev was a sculptor and her daughter Galina Dmitrieva is a Moscow graphic artist.

== Works ==
She was particularly attracted by the art of Bakst. During her summer holidays she could spend long hours in her private "studio" - the garret of a big barn – drawing and modeling figures in red clay. She moved to Leningrad to study sculpture, but after two years in the faculty of sculpture at the Leningrad Academy of Arts, she transferred to the Academy's graphics faculty. Here she studied under the prominent artists Dmitry Mitrokhin and Kruglikova specializing in posters. Other teachers were Konashevich, Radlov, Shillingovskii and Petrov-Vodkin.

Thematically, her drawings of the 1920s and early 1930s revolve around the theatre; the early works were inspired by Art Nouveau, and the later ones by the Russian avant-garde. Her works are often characterised by a strong sense of melancholy, and a not very subtle eroticism.

After graduating from the Academy and moving to Moscow in the late 1920s, Galina began to work in the field of political posters and portraits. She drew inspiration in Deineka's works. Her posters of the early 1930s and the pre-war years are all bright and optimistic.
