= Shangfang Township, Hebei =

Coordinates: 38°31′44″N 114°27′35″E

Shangfang Township 上方乡
- Township

Chinese transcription(s)
- Interactive map of Shangfang Township
- Country: China
- Province: Hebei
- Prefecture: Shijiazhuang
- County: Xingtang County
- Time zone: UTC+8 (China Standard Time)

Shangfang Township (Chinese: 上方乡) is a township-level division of Xingtang County, Shijiazhuang, Hebei, China.

== See also ==
- List of township-level divisions of Hebei
