= Jiukouzi Township =

Jiukouzi Township 九口子乡
- Township
- Location in Hebei
- Coordinates: 38°38′45″N 114°21′14″E
- Country: People's Republic of China
- Province: Hebei
- Prefecture-level city: Shijiazhuang
- County: Xingtang
- Village-level divisions: 36 villages
- Elevation: 211 m (692 ft)
- Time zone: UTC+8 (China Standard)
- Area code: 0311

Jiukouzi (Chinese: 九口子; pinyin: Jiǔkǒuzi; lit. 'nine holes') is a township of Xingtang County in the eastern foothills of the Taihang Mountains in western Hebei province, China, located about 29 kilometres (18 mi) northwest of the county seat. As of 2011, it has 36 villages under its administration. The township is situated on the northern shore of the Koutou Reservoir (口头水库).

== See also ==
- List of township-level divisions of Hebei
