= Yuting Township =

Coordinates: 38°32′10″N 114°30′38″E

Yuting Township 玉亭乡
- Township

Chinese transcription(s)
- Interactive map of Yuting Township
- Country: China
- Province: Hebei
- Prefecture: Shijiazhuang
- County: Xingtang County
- Time zone: UTC+8 (China Standard Time)

Yuting Township (Chinese: 玉亭乡) is a township-level division of Xingtang County, Shijiazhuang, Hebei, China.

== See also ==
- List of township-level divisions of Hebei
