= Longzhou, Hebei =

Longzhou 龙州镇
- Town
- Location in Hebei
- Coordinates: 38°26′05″N 114°32′47″E
- Country: People's Republic of China
- Province: Hebei
- Prefecture-level city: Shijiazhuang
- County: Xingtang
- Village-level divisions: 8 residential communities 25 villages
- Elevation: 106 m (348 ft)
- Time zone: UTC+8 (China Standard)
- Postal code: 050700
- Area code: 0311

Longzhou (simplified Chinese: 龙州; traditional Chinese: 龍州; pinyin: Lóngzhōu) is a town and the seat of Xingtang County in southwestern Hebei province, China. As of 2011, it has eight residential communities (社区) and 25 villages under its administration.

== See also ==
- List of township-level divisions of Hebei
