= Duyanggang Township =

Duyanggang Township 独羊岗乡
- Township
- Location in Hebei
- Coordinates: 38°27′10″N 114°35′21″E
- Country: People's Republic of China
- Province: Hebei
- Prefecture-level city: Shijiazhuang
- County: Xingtang
- Village-level divisions: 16 villages
- Elevation: 97 m (318 ft)
- Time zone: UTC+8 (China Standard)
- Area code: 0311

Duyanggang Township (simplified Chinese: 独羊岗乡; traditional Chinese: 獨羊崗鄉; pinyin: Dúyánggǎng Xiāng) is a township of Xingtang County in western Hebei province, China, located about 3 kilometres (1.9 mi) northeast of the county seat. As of 2011, it has 16 villages under its administration.

== See also ==
- List of township-level divisions of Hebei
