= Diying Township =

Diying Township 翟营乡
- Township
- Location in Hebei
- Coordinates: 38°26′06″N 114°26′27″E
- Country: People's Republic of China
- Province: Hebei
- Prefecture-level city: Shijiazhuang
- County: Xingtang
- Village-level divisions: 29 villages
- Elevation: 128 m (420 ft)
- Time zone: UTC+8 (China Standard)
- Area code: 0311

Diying Township (simplified Chinese: 翟营乡; traditional Chinese: 翟營鄉; pinyin: Díyíng Xiāng) is a township of Xingtang County in western Hebei province, China, located less than 10 kilometres (6.2 mi) west of the county seat across G5 Beijing–Kunming Expressway. As of 2011, it has 29 villages under its administration.

== See also ==
- List of township-level divisions of Hebei
