= Beihe Township =

Beihe Township 北河乡
- Township
- Location in Hebei
- Coordinates: 38°37′59″N 114°29′59″E
- Country: People's Republic of China
- Province: Hebei
- Prefecture-level city: Shijiazhuang
- County: Xingtang
- Village-level divisions: 9 villages
- Elevation: 184 m (604 ft)
- Time zone: UTC+8 (China Standard)
- Area code: 0311

Beihe (Chinese: 北河; pinyin: Běihé; lit. 'north river') is a township of Xingtang County, Hebei, China, located in the eastern foothills of the Taihang Mountains 22 kilometres (14 mi) north-northwest of the county seat. As of 2011, it had 9 villages under its administration.

== See also ==
- List of township-level divisions of Hebei
