= Anxiang Township =

Anxiang Township 安香乡
- Township
- Location in Hebei
- Coordinates: 38°23′05″N 114°32′18″E
- Country: People's Republic of China
- Province: Hebei
- Prefecture-level city: Shijiazhuang
- County: Xingtang
- Village-level divisions: 22 villages

Area
  - Total: 64.28 km^{2} (24.82 sq mi)
- Elevation: 101 m (331 ft)

Population (2004)
  - Total: 39,300
- Time zone: UTC+8 (China Standard)
- Area code: 0311

Anxiang (Chinese: 安香; pinyin: Ānxiāng) is a township of Xingtang County, Hebei, China. Anxiang is located 7.4 kilometres (4.6 mi) south of the county seat and 56 kilometres (35 mi) by road north of Shijiazhuang.

The township covers an area of 64.28 square kilometres (24.82 sq mi) and had a population of 39,300 in 2004.

Between 1161 and 1187 AD, the Hong Yan Temple was built here, later changed to the Temple of Xi'an Hong.

== Economy ==
In 1954, primary agricultural production cooperatives were established, and developed into advanced agricultural producers' cooperatives in 1956. The township is agricultural based with 53,200 acres of arable land, the main crops being red sage root, Atractylodes, Chinese yam, Campanulaceae, astragalus, etc., with an annual output of 900 tons. Aquaculture has developed rapidly and the township has two large dairy farms. However, at the last census, 496 business enterprises were recorded in the township, industries such as plywood, machinery, nutritional supplements, aside from chicken and cattle farming.

== Administrative divisions ==
The township contains the following villages:

- Xi'anxiang Village (西安香村)
- Dong'anxiang Village (东安香村)
- Biwei Village (笔尾村)
- Beixieshen Village (北协神村)
- Dongzheng Village (东正村)
- Dongzhengzhuang Village (东正庄村)
- Yuehuokou Village (岳霍口村)
- Zhanghuokou Village (张霍口村)
- Mihuokou Village (米霍口村)
- Hujiazhuang Village (胡家庄村)
- Dongliuying Village (东留营村)
- Xiliuying Village (西留营村)
- Dongfuliu Village (东伏流村)
- Nanfuliu Village (南伏流村)
- Xifuliu Village (西伏流村)
- Beifuliu Village (北伏流村)
- Zhongfuliu Village (中伏流村)
- Nanzhangwu Village (南张吾村)
- Beizhangwu Village (北张吾村)
- Changxiang Village (常香村)
- Cihezhuang Village (慈河庄村)
- Xizheng Village (西正村)

== See also ==
- List of township-level divisions of Hebei
