= Tracy B. Strong =

Political philosopher

Tracy Burr Strong
- Born: 6 October 1943; Weixian Internment Camp, China
- Died: 11 May 2022 (aged 78); Chandlers Ford, United Kingdom

Philosophical work
- Era: Contemporary political philosophy
- Region: Western philosophy
- Main interests: Political science, government, philosophy, music, aesthetics, literature

Tracy Burr Strong (6 October 1943 – 11 May 2022) was a philosopher and political theorist. His first book, Friedrich Nietzsche and the Politics of Transfiguration (1974) was recognised as a valuable contribution to scholarship on the German philosopher Friedrich Nietzsche. It repositioned Nietzsche's project as political against the assumption that Nietzsche's philosophy was apolitical.

== Life and career ==
Strong was born in Weixian, China, while his parents were being held within a Japanese prisoner-of-war camp. A Swedish vessel, the Gripsholm, took Strong as a baby to New York for repatriation, arriving on 18 December 1943. He was educated at Collège de Genève and at Oberlin College (where he played soccer, was on the fencing team, and majored in government), earning a BA in 1963. He received a PhD from Harvard University in 1968. He was Henry Kissinger's teaching assistant, and was president of the Harvard chapter of Students for a Democratic Society.

As an instructor at Harvard University he taught political theory, a topic he continued to pursue with appointments at the University of Pittsburgh, Amherst and at the University of California at San Diego, where he also served as Associate Chancellor (as well as department chair) until his retirement after which he took up a new appointment in the department of Politics and International Relations at the University of Southampton. He also taught at Barcelona University and the University of Lyon in addition to Florence. He was appointed to an international research project in ethnography at Heidelberg University. Until his death, he was lecturing and mentoring students at the University of Southampton, where he was only a few weeks away from his second retirement.

== Philosophical and other academic work ==
Considered an "eminent interpreter of Rousseau and Nietzsche", Strong published on political theory and philosophy with additional interests in the history of ideas, aesthetics in the contexts of film and traditional art forms. He was also an authority on Carl Schmitt and he published journal papers and books on Hobbes, Rousseau, Nietzsche, and Shakespeare and Mark Twain among others.

His first book, Friedrich Nietzsche and the Politics of Transfiguration, published in 1974, was considered a watershed moment in both political philosophy and Nietzsche studies. His later text, Politics Without Vision: Thinking without a Banister in the Twentieth Century won the David Easton Prize in 2013.

From 1990 to 2000, an exceptional ten-year tenure, he served as editor of the journal Political Theory and co-authored a biography of his great-aunt, the author and journalist Anna Louise Strong. In his latter years he embarked on studies of the role of good and evil, in addition to Jesus and love in Nietzsche's work. Additionally, he was a long time friend of Stanley Cavell whom he first met at Harvard.

He had an abiding interest in Richard Wagner, Beethoven, and music in general, as well as Samuel Beckett and Mark Twain, Abraham Lincoln, Ralph Waldo Emerson, Hawthorne, Wallace Stevens, and Shakespeare.

== Selected writings ==
=== Authored volumes ===
- Friedrich Nietzsche and the Politics of Transfiguration, Berkeley, CA: University of California Press, 1975. Expanded edition, Champaign, Illinois: University of Illinois Press, 1999.
- The Idea of Political Theory: Reflections on the Self in Political Time & Place, Notre Dame: University of Notre Dame Press, 1990.
- Jean-Jacques Rousseau: The Politics of the Ordinary, Lanham, Maryland: Rowman & Littlefield, 2002. Originally published in 1994 by Sage Publications.
- Right in Her Soul: The Life of Anna Louise Strong (with Helene Keyssar), New York: Random House, 1983.
- Politics Without Vision: Thinking Without a Banister in the Twentieth Century, Chicago, IL: University of Chicago Press, 2012.
- Learning One’s Native Tongue: Citizenship, Contestation, and Conflict in America, Chicago, IL: University of Chicago Press, 2019.
