= Shangyanzhuang Township =

Shangyanzhuang Township 上闫庄乡
- Township

Chinese transcription(s)
- Interactive map of Shangyanzhuang Township
- Country: China
- Province: Hebei
- Prefecture: Shijiazhuang
- County: Xingtang County
- Time zone: UTC+8 (China Standard Time)

Shangyanzhuang Township (Chinese: 上闫庄乡) is a township-level division of Xingtang County, Shijiazhuang, Hebei, China.

== See also ==
- List of township-level divisions of Hebei
