= Manya Reiss =

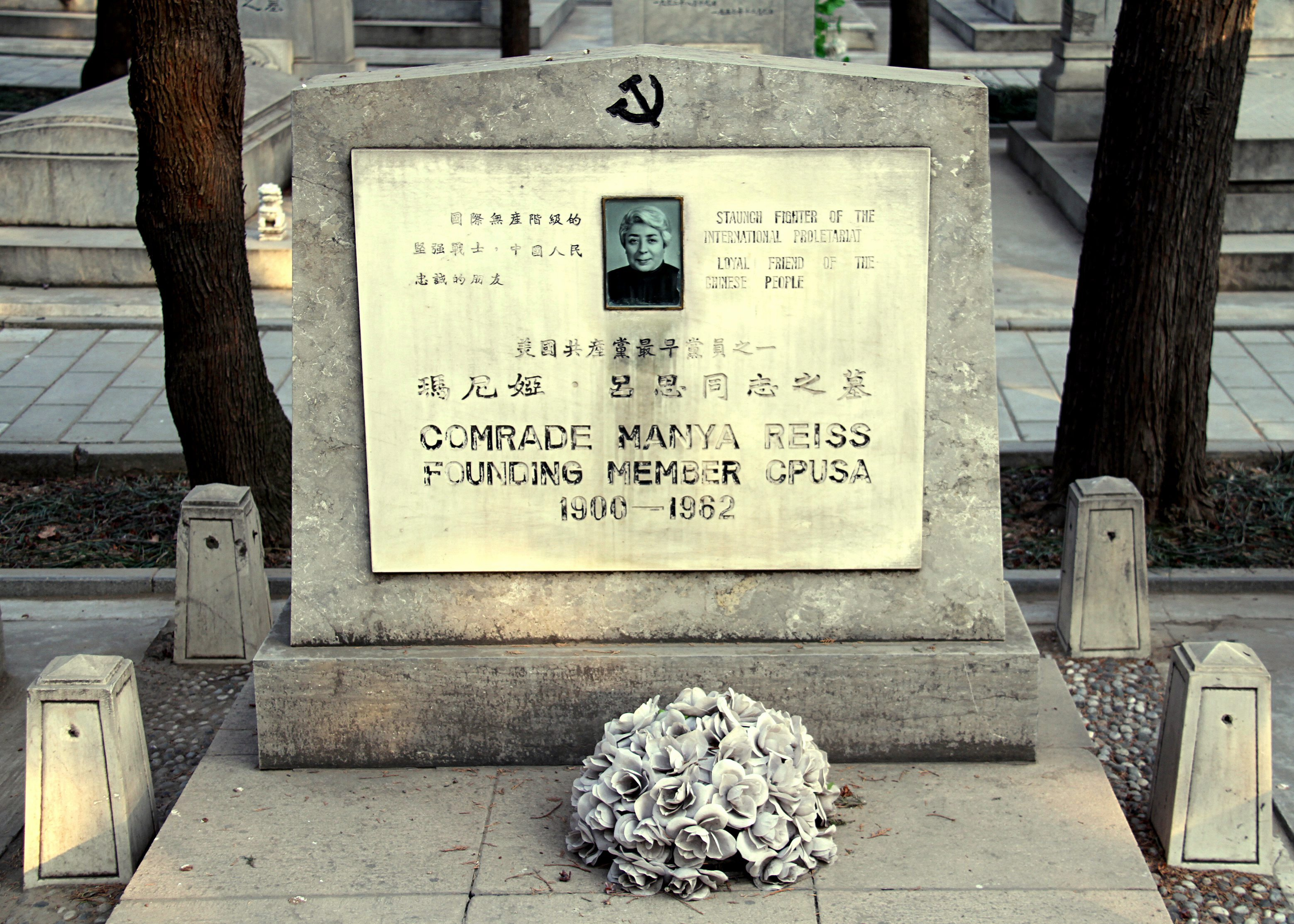
Headstone for Manya Reiss at the Babaoshan Revolutionary Cemetery in Beijing

Manya Reiss (also known as Maria Aerova, sometimes spelled Ayerova, Chinese: 马尼娅; pinyin: Mǎníyà, 1900–1962) was an American Marxist–Leninist and a founding member of the Communist Party USA (CPUSA).

== Biography ==
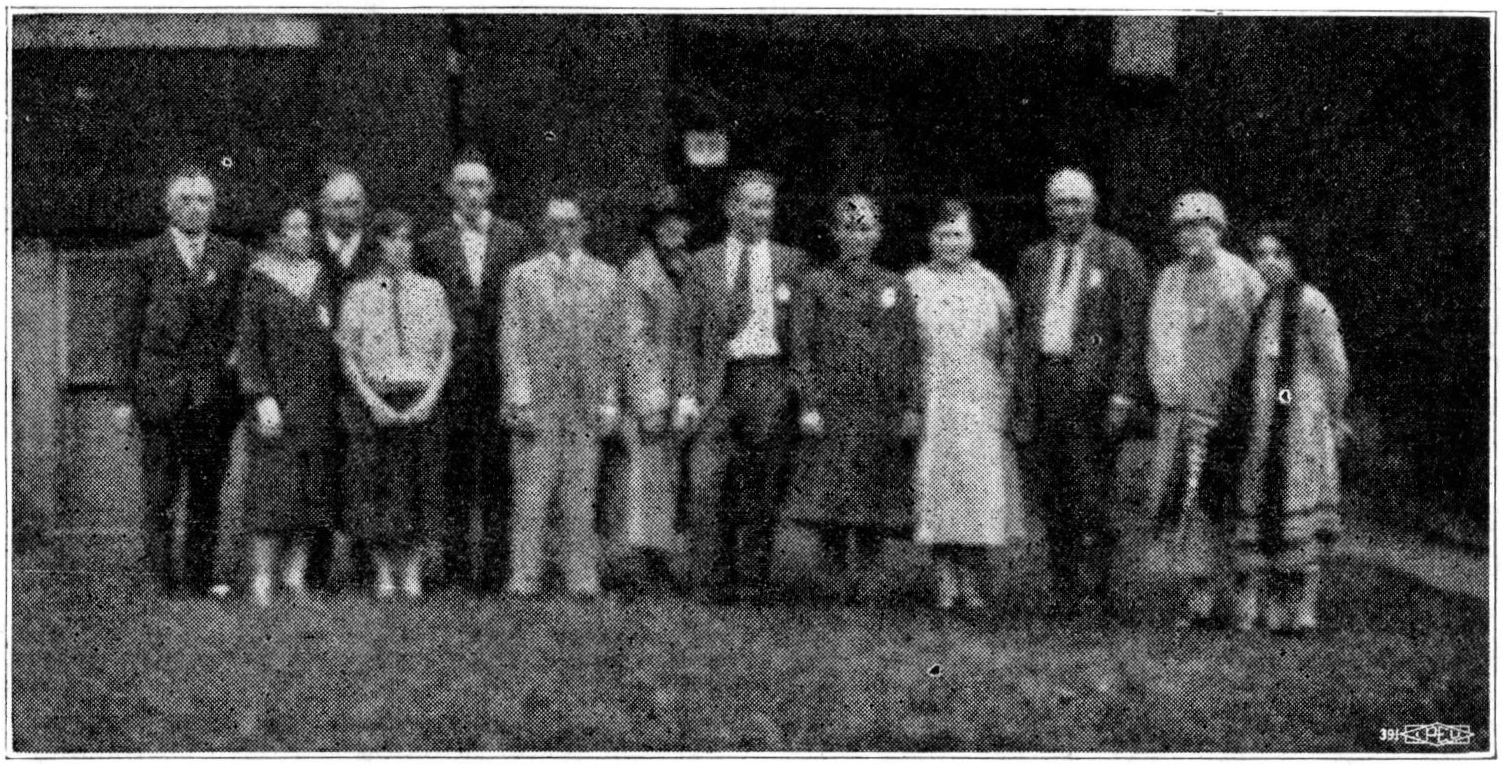
Reiss (far right) among regional secretaries of the International Labor Defense, September 5–6, 1926

Manya Reiss was born in China to a family of Russian-Jewish origin and then immigrated to the United States in 1912. In the United States, she was a garment worker as well as a communist activist. In 1931, she attended the International Lenin School. After this, she worked for the Eastern Secretariat of the Comintern and was later sent on missions to Germany and France. She returned to the United States in the late 1930s to work for the propaganda department of the Communist Party USA and to teach at a party school. By 1940, she had returned to Moscow.

In 1957, Reiss moved to China to work for Xinhua News Agency and the Beijing Daily.

When Reiss became ill with cancer, she was visited in the hospital by Zhou Enlai, Chen Yi, and Lu Dingyi.

Reiss died of cancer in Beijing and was buried at the Babaoshan Revolutionary Cemetery. Wu Lengxi, director of the New China News Agency and Sidney Rittenberg delivered eulogies. People's Daily reported on her death and memorial service.
