= Deyneka =

Deyneka (Deineka) is a surname. Notable people with the surname include:

- Aleksandr Deyneka (1899–1969), Russian artist
- Peter Deyneka (1897–1987), Russian-American evangelist and missionary to the Russian diaspora

== See also ==
- Deyneko
- Dayneko
- 9514 Deineka, asteroid
