= Xingtang County =

Xingtang County 行唐县 Singtang
- County
- Location in Hebei
- Coordinates: 38°26′17″N 114°33′11″E
- Country: People's Republic of China
- Province: Hebei
- Prefecture-level city: Shijiazhuang

Area
  - Total: 956.5 km^{2} (369.3 sq mi)

Population (2020 census)
  - Total: 376,627
  - Density: 393.8/km^{2} (1,020/sq mi)
- Time zone: UTC+8 (China Standard)

Xingtang County (simplified Chinese: 行唐县; traditional Chinese: 行唐縣; pinyin: Xíngtáng Xiàn) is a county of Hebei Province, North China. It is under the administration of the prefecture-level city of Shijiazhuang, the capital of the province.

== Administrative divisions ==
Towns:

- Longzhou (龙州镇), Nanqiao (南桥镇), Shangbei (上碑镇), Koutou (口头镇)

Townships:

- Duyanggang Township (独羊岗乡), Anxiang Township (安香乡), Zhili Township (只里乡), Shitong Township (市同乡), Diying Township (翟营乡), Chengzhai Township (城寨乡), Shangfang Township (上方乡), Yuting Township (玉亭乡), Beihe Township (北河乡), Shangyanzhuang Township (上阎庄乡), Jiukouzi Township (九口子乡)

== Climate ==
Climate data for Xingtang, elevation 100 m (330 ft), (1991–2020 normals, extremes 1981–present)
Month	Jan	Feb	Mar	Apr	May	Jun	Jul	Aug	Sep	Oct	Nov	Dec	Year
Record high °C (°F)	16.7 (62.1)	25.5 (77.9)	31.5 (88.7)	35.4 (95.7)	37.9 (100.2)	42.4 (108.3)	42.4 (108.3)	37.0 (98.6)	38.5 (101.3)	32.2 (90.0)	25.7 (78.3)	22.0 (71.6)	42.4 (108.3)
Mean daily maximum °C (°F)	3.1 (37.6)	7.2 (45.0)	14.2 (57.6)	21.0 (69.8)	26.6 (79.9)	31.7 (89.1)	31.9 (89.4)	30.0 (86.0)	26.5 (79.7)	20.2 (68.4)	11.1 (52.0)	4.5 (40.1)	19.0 (66.2)
Daily mean °C (°F)	−3.0 (26.6)	0.8 (33.4)	7.6 (45.7)	14.7 (58.5)	20.5 (68.9)	25.3 (77.5)	26.9 (80.4)	25.2 (77.4)	20.5 (68.9)	13.9 (57.0)	5.3 (41.5)	−1.2 (29.8)	13.0 (55.5)
Mean daily minimum °C (°F)	−8.0 (17.6)	−4.4 (24.1)	1.7 (35.1)	8.5 (47.3)	14.3 (57.7)	19.5 (67.1)	22.5 (72.5)	21.1 (70.0)	15.5 (59.9)	8.8 (47.8)	0.7 (33.3)	−5.6 (21.9)	7.9 (46.2)
Record low °C (°F)	−20.4 (−4.7)	−18.6 (−1.5)	−9.3 (15.3)	−3.1 (26.4)	3.3 (37.9)	8.6 (47.5)	15.4 (59.7)	12.8 (55.0)	2.7 (36.9)	−4.3 (24.3)	−12.2 (10.0)	−24.0 (−11.2)	−24.0 (−11.2)
Average precipitation mm (inches)	2.6 (0.10)	4.8 (0.19)	9.6 (0.38)	23.8 (0.94)	37.9 (1.49)	55.7 (2.19)	132.5 (5.22)	123.8 (4.87)	57.7 (2.27)	23.9 (0.94)	13.9 (0.55)	2.7 (0.11)	488.9 (19.25)
Average precipitation days (≥ 0.1 mm)	1.8	2.2	2.8	4.8	5.8	9.1	12.2	10.6	7.0	5.0	3.4	2.0	145
Average snowy days	2.4	2.3	1.0	0.1	0	0	0	0	0	0	1.3	2.3	9.4
Average relative humidity (%)	56	52	50	57	61	62	76	81	75	67	65	60	64
Mean monthly sunshine hours	154.3	196.7	222.0	247.9	207.7	174.1	182.3	184.7	178.7	154.5	149.4	—	—
Percentage possible sunshine	47	50	53	56	56	47	39	44	50	52	52	51	50
Source: China Meteorological Administration
