= Chengzhai Township =

Chengzhai Township 城寨乡
- Township
- Location in Hebei
- Coordinates: 38°31′52″N 114°21′37″E
- Country: People's Republic of China
- Province: Hebei
- Prefecture-level city: Shijiazhuang
- County: Xingtang
- Village-level divisions: 25 villages
- Elevation: 174 m (571 ft)
- Time zone: UTC+8 (China Standard)
- Area code: 0311

Chengzhai (Chinese: 城寨; pinyin: Chéngzhài) is a township of Xingtang County in western Hebei province, China, located in the eastern foothills of the Taihang Mountains about 19 kilometres (12 mi) northwest of the county seat. As of 2011, it has 25 villages under its administration.

== See also ==
- List of township-level divisions of Hebei
