= Qincheng Prison =

Maximum-security prison in Beijing, China

Coordinates: 40°14′29″N 116°23′00″E

- Simplified Chinese: 秦城监狱
- Traditional Chinese: 秦城監獄
Transcriptions
Standard Mandarin
- Hanyu Pinyin: Qínchéng Jiānyù
- Wade–Giles: Ch'ínch'éng Chiēnyǜ
- Yale Romanization: Chínchéng Jyānyù
- IPA: [tɕʰǐnʈʂʰə̌ŋ tɕjɛ́nŷ]
Yue: Cantonese
- Yale Romanization: cheùhn sèhng gāam yuhk
- Jyutping: ceon4 seng4 gaam1 juk6
- IPA: Cantonese pronunciation: [tsʰɵ̏n sɛ̏ːŋ káːm jỳːk]
Southern Min
- Hokkien POJ: Chîn-siâⁿ kaⁿ-ga̍k

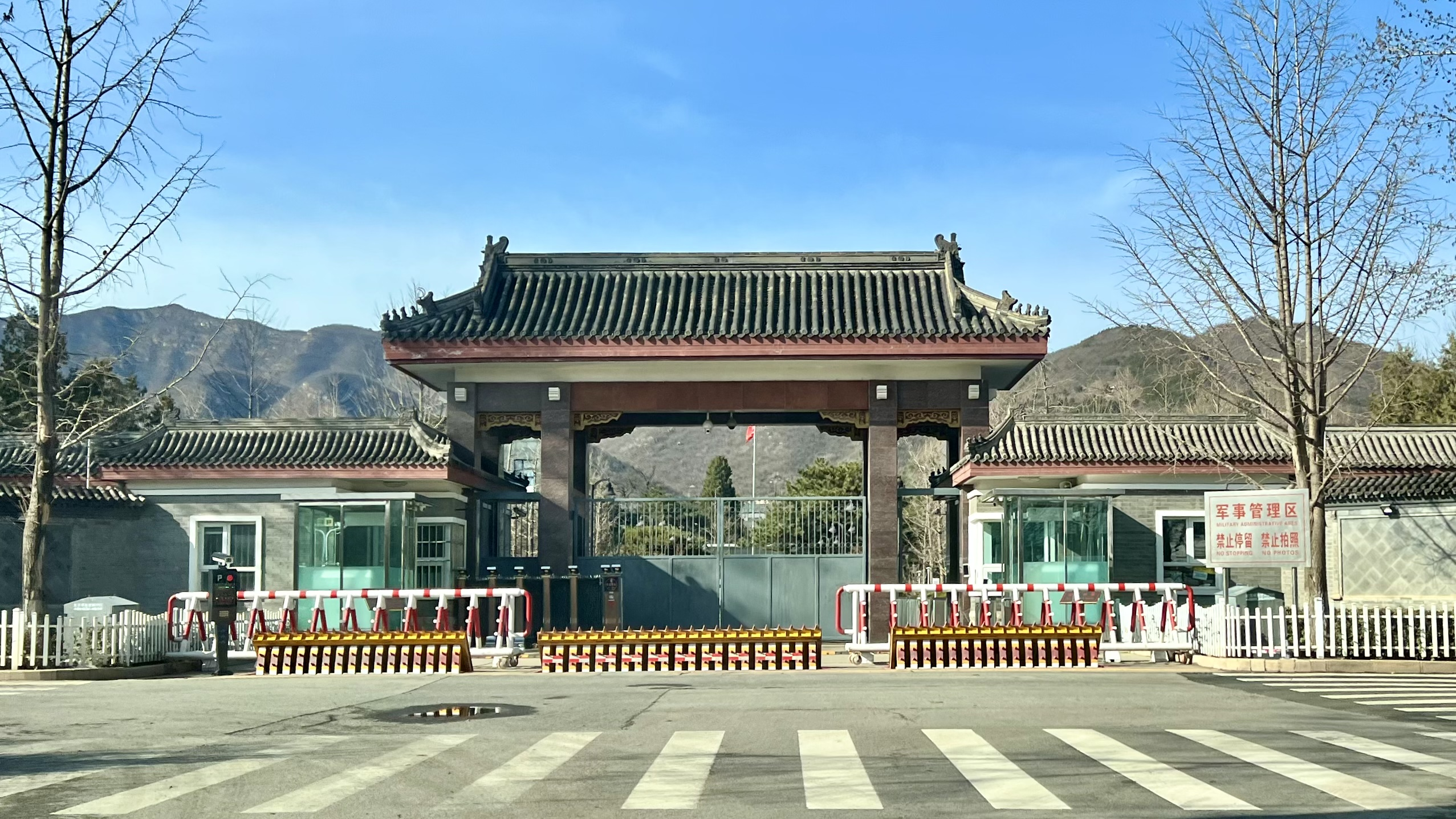
Entrance of Qincheng Prison in March 2022

The Ministry of Public Security Qincheng Prison (Chinese: 公安部秦城监狱) is a maximum-security prison located in Qincheng Village, Xingshou, Changping District, Beijing in the People's Republic of China. The prison was built in 1958 with aid from the Soviet Union and is the only prison belonging to China's Ministry of Public Security. The Ministry of Justice operates other non-military prisons.

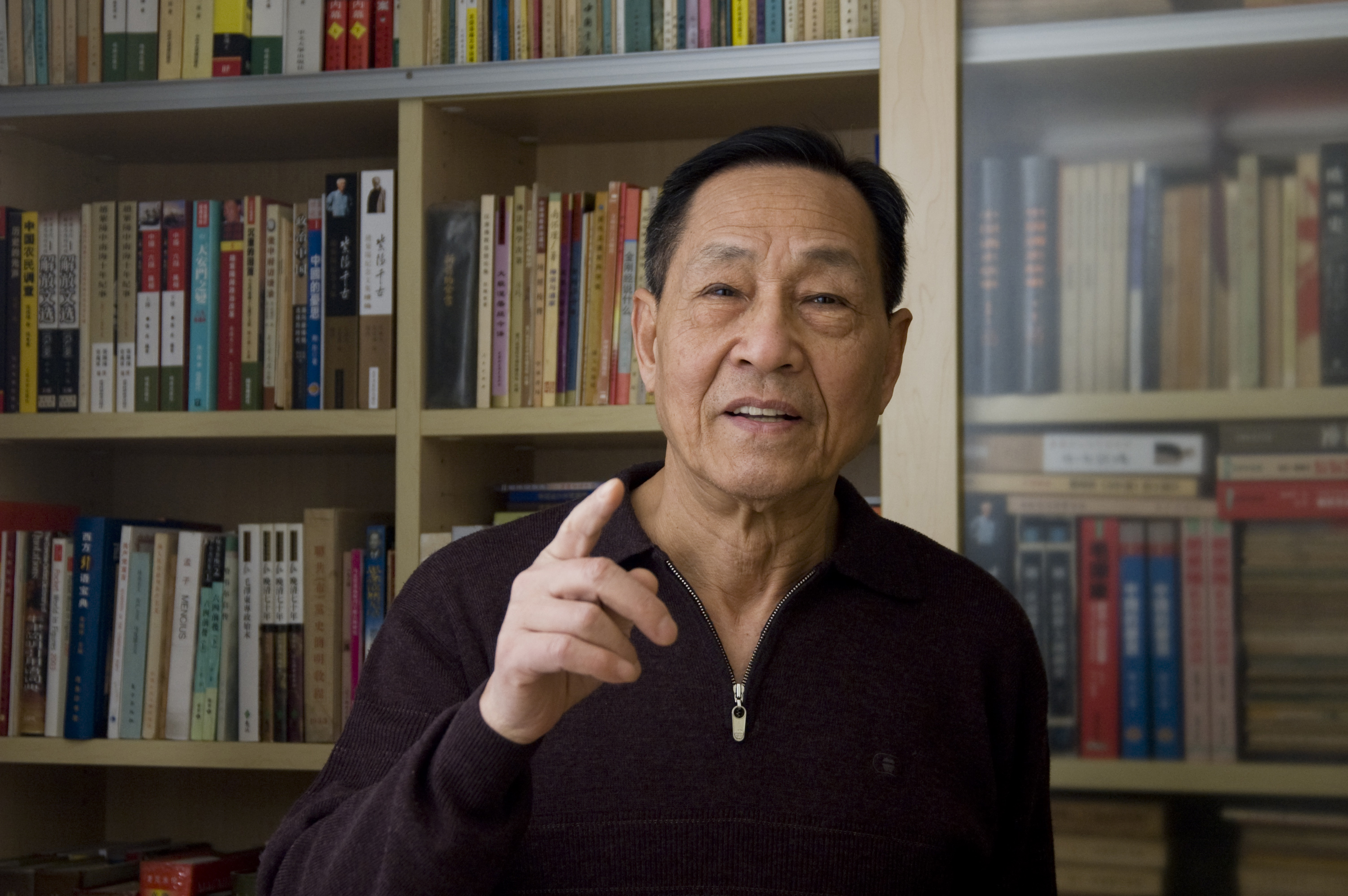
Bao Tong was the highest government official to be imprisoned after the 1989 Tiananmen Square protests. He spent 7 years in Qincheng Prison, and lived under tight surveillance for the rest of his life while continuing to be an outspoken critic of the Chinese Communist Party.

Political prisoners have been incarcerated in Qincheng, among them participants in the Chinese democracy movement and Tiananmen Square protests of 1989. Famous former inmates include Li Rui, Jiang Qing, Yuan Geng, Bao Tong, Dai Qing, as well as Tibetan figures such as the 10th Panchen Lama Choekyi Gyaltsen and Phuntsok Wangyal. Other inmates included many communist cadres who struggled during the Cultural Revolution, such as Bo Yibo, Peng Zhen, Liu Xiaobo, Israel Epstein, Sidney Rittenberg, Michael Shapiro, and David Crook. More recently, high-ranking officials accused of corruption such as Chen Xitong, Chen Liangyu, Bo Xilai, and Zhou Yongkang were also imprisoned here.

The prison is located at the eastern foothill of Yanshan, facing the North China Plain in the east, north and south. The plain is where Qincheng Farm (Chinese: 秦城农场; pinyin: Qínchéng Nóngchǎng) is located, which is part of the prison.

== Origin ==
The prison was originally built to house Kuomintang (Nationalist) political prisoners, but due to secrecy, the name was not publicized. Instead, it was simply referred to as project #156, since it was number 156 out of 157 projects that China established with Soviet assistance. The head of Beijing Bureau of Public Security, Feng Jiping (simplified Chinese: 冯基平; traditional Chinese: 馮基平; pinyin: Féng Jīpíng), was in charge of construction of the prison. Ironically, during the Cultural Revolution he was among the first to be jailed there. He was also one of the last to get out among those who were sent to the prison with him.

== Structure ==
The prison is built in accordance with the 1954 Reform Through Labor Regulations, so it is divided into three sections. The first section is for jail houses, and it includes both the jail houses for low-ranking prisoners and that of high-ranking prisoners, with the ranking often decided by the prisoner's social status, job position, and level of crime before entering the prisons. The second is called the Management and Work Section, the largest one among all three, with Qincheng Farm for field labors. The last section is the residential section for employees such as wardens and their relatives.

The prison is sandwiched between orchards, with farm land and fish pond in front, an exact reflection of Mao Zedong's claim in October, 1960: "our prisons are different than prisons in the past - each prison is actually a school, but also a factory or a farm." Mao had further enhanced this on April 24, 1964, in his reaction to a case by claiming that "People can be reformed, if the correct policy and methods are adopted." This characteristic also applies to most Chinese prisons, and Chinese have called this prison system as: "Special militarized organization, special enterprise, and special school."

The jailhouse part has four buildings built upon the prison's establishment, with each having three stories. In 1967 an additional six buildings opened, with each not as large as each original building.

=== Cells ===
The original prison include four three-story brick buildings with sloped roof, each is named after celestial stems instead of numbers or alphabets: Jia (甲), Yi (乙), Bing (丙), Ding (丁). The area in front of each building is fenced with brick wall for prisoners to exercise, forming its own independent yard. Each exercise yard is divided into two sections evenly by a wall in the middle, on top of which guard patrolled, and would watch both sections. Each floor of the building is divided into many halls, on one side of the hall, there is a wall, opposite to the wall is where the cells are located, each individually locked with a padlock. There are at least 10 cells in each hall.

The area of each cell is around 20 square meters (220 sq ft). There is a window for each cell designed for lower-ranking prisoners. The area of the window is around one square meter, located more than two meters above the ground. The windowsill is sloped upward with window opens upward toward outside, but of course, prisoners are unable to open the window themselves. There are three layers for every window: screen, iron fence, and glass painted white. In the cells for high-ranking prisoners, there are two windows but the outermost layer is sanded glass instead of glass painted white. Prisoners could neither see the courtyard nor any other buildings, but some could see the mountain and sun from their cells. A 15-watt light bulb with sanded glass is on the 3.5-meter-high (11 ft) ceiling, and it is covered by iron mesh, and the dim light is controlled by guards via a switch outside. By the 2010s prison cells had at least one window, with two windows for VIP prisoners, and the cells had washing machines, desks, and in-suite bathrooms. The Straits Times stated that after a mid-1990s remodeling the cells became more luxurious.

In 1967, six more buildings were added, also named after celestial stem, continuing as Wu (戊), Ji (己), Geng (庚), Xin (辛), Ren (壬), Gui (癸). The new jail houses are concrete and contain many more cells because the new cells are much smaller in comparison to those in the blocks built in 1958: the area of each cell is only 5–10 square meters (54–108 sq ft). The toilet in these new cells require that the prisoners must squat to use the toilet and that they carry water from the sink to flush the toilet. There are two doors for each cells built in 1967: the outer one is an iron door and the inside one is a wooden door. Other features of the blocks built in 1967 are similar to those built in 1958.

== Administration ==
Qincheng Prison has been under the administration of the 13th Bureau of the Ministry of Public Security most of the time since its establishment. Beginning in late October 1967, it came under the control of the People's Liberation Army which at this point had been put in charge of the 13th Bureau by the Central Cultural Revolution Group and Zhou Enlai. The "Military Control Commission of the 13th Bureau" administered the prison until April–June 1969 when the Bureau itself was abolished. The administration of Qincheng Prison now became the responsibility of a "Military Control Commission of Qincheng Prison" which reported to the Beijing municipal Bureau of Public Security Military Control Commission and not to the Ministry of Public Security. Thus formally "downgraded" in administrative terms, Qincheng was until the end of 1972 referred to in public documents as the Seventh Brigade of the Military Commission of the Beijing Bureau of Public Security. The Ministry of Public Security reasserted control over the prison in early 1973, after a decision to this effect had been taken by Premier Zhou Enlai on 8 January of that year.

During the reform in the 1980s, the combined judicial and executive roles of the Ministry of Public Security is separated and the Ministry of Public Security only retained its executive role. In June 1983, the administration of prisons was transferred to the Ministry of Justice, but due to the special need, the Ministry of Public Security still retained several prisons under its administration and Qincheng Prison was one of them, still under the administration of the 13th Bureau of the Ministry of Public Security.

Originally designed to house Nationalist political prisoners classified by the Communists, this category of prisoners no longer existed when the last batch were released in 1975. The largest category of prisoners is in fact, coming from within Communist ranks, like former cadres. The largest increase of prisoners occurred during Cultural Revolution, with extra buildings had to be built.

== Management ==
=== Abuse ===
Wei Jingsheng had published under his name in March 1979 an essay denouncing the inhumane conditions of the Chinese Qincheng Prison where he was imprisoned the 10th Panchen Lama and that drove the latter to a suicide attempt. It is clear that a major part of this essay was written by other anonymous authors with accurate information about Qincheng.

=== Healthcare ===
There is a medical clinic at the Qincheng Prison with both doctors and nurses assigned. There is also a dental clinic, built of brick and stone, located further away from the main prison buildings. In addition to treating prisoners for ordinary illness, semi-annual physical checks are also performed. High-ranking prisoners could receive more frequent checks depending on their health conditions. Both the high-ranking and low-ranking prisoners receive better health care than ordinary citizens outside, and this situation has not changed since the first day when the prison was established.

Medical treatment for high-profile inmates at Qincheng Prison is rarely determined by the medical staff alone. Instead, treatment protocols are often subject to political decisions made by the highest levels of the government. For example, in the autumn of 1969 during Cultural Revolution, under Kang Sheng's order, an important high-ranking prisoner, Shi Zhe (师哲), the former personal secretary and personal Russian translator of Mao Zedong was jailed in Qincheng prison. He was scheduled to have an operation to remove a so-called cancer. However, doctors determined that there was no cancer, but Kang Sheng insisted on Shi Zhe having an operation, and the unnecessary operation was carried out to fulfill the political task.

== See also ==
- Penal system in China
  - MOJ Yancheng Prison
