= Nanqiao, Xingtang County =

Coordinates: 38.51621°N 114.56475°E

Nanqiao 南桥镇
- Town

Chinese transcription(s)
- Interactive map of Nanqiao
- Country: China
- Province: Hebei
- Prefecture: Shijiazhuang
- County: Xingtang County
- Time zone: UTC+8 (China Standard Time)

Nanqiao Town (Chinese: 南桥镇) is a township-level division of Xingtang County, Shijiazhuang, Hebei, China.

== See also ==
- List of township-level divisions of Hebei
