= List of honorary citizens of Beijing =

Honorary citizen of Beijing is an honorary title awarded to foreigners, overseas Chinese and Hong Kong and Macau compatriots who have made outstanding contributions to Beijing's foreign cooperation, economic construction and social development. The honorary citizen's certificate and badge will be issued by the Beijing Municipal Government.

For foreigners, overseas Chinese, Hong Kong and Macau compatriots who have been awarded the honorary citizenship of Beijing, all relevant institutions in Beijing shall provide assistance in their working and living in Beijing. They will be invited to participate in major celebrations organized by Beijing and enjoy VIP privileges.

== List of honorary citizens ==
As of 30 March 2017.

#	Name	Birth-Death	Nationality	Notes	Granted
1	Rewi Alley	1897 – 1987	New Zealand	Writer and political activist expatriating in China	2 December 1982
2	Shunichi Suzuki	1910 – 2010	Japan	Governor of Tokyo	28 October 1983
3	Michael Shapiro	1910 – 1986	United Kingdom	Expert of Xinhua News Agency expatriating in China	30 September 1986
4	Hubertus Graf von Faber-Castell	1934 – 2007	Germany	German banking and industrial heir and chinese media pioneer	27 October 1990
5	Henry Fok Ying Tung	1923 – 2006	Hong Kong, China	Vice Chairman of the Chinese People's Political Consultative Conference	29 September 1999
5	Tsang Hin-chi	1934 – 2019	Hong Kong, China	President of Goldlion Group Co. Ltd.	29 September 1999
5	Sir Li Ka-shing	1928 –	Hong Kong, China	Chairman of CK Hutchison Holdings	29 September 1999
5	Lee Shau-kee	1929 –	Hong Kong, China	Chairman of Henderson Land Development	29 September 1999
5	Cheng Yu-tung	1925 – 2016	Hong Kong, China	Chairman of New World Development	29 September 1999
5	Walter Kwok Ping-sheung	1950 – 2018	Hong Kong, China	Chairman of Sun Hung Kai Properties	29 September 1999
5	Chen Jinglun	1925 –	Hong Kong, China	Hong Kong entrepreneur, donator of Beijing Chen Jing Lun High School	29 September 1999
5	Robert Kuok Hock Nien	1923 –	Malaysia	Chairman of Kerry Properties	29 September 1999
5	Manfred Durniok	1934 – 2003	Germany	Film producer, director and screenwriter	29 September 1999
5	Hui Jingzai	1932 –	China (overseas)	Chairman of Niigata Overseas Chinese Association	29 September 1999
15	Lauther Chell	1938 –	Germany	Piano manufacturing expert expatriating in China	24 January 2000
16	Ora Namir	1930 – 2019	Israel	Israeli Ambassador to China	13 May 2000
17	Stanley Ho Hung-sun	1921 –	Macau, China	Chairman of Sociedade de Turismo e Diversões de Macau	1 January 2001
18	Zdzisław Góralczy	1936 –	Poland	Polish Ambassador to China	12 February 2001
19	George Ernest Killian	1924 – 2017	United States	President of the International University Sports Federation	21 September 2001
20	Jorma Jaakko Ollila	1950 –	Finland	Chairman & CEO of Nokia	8 August 2002
20	Yoshiharu Fukuhara	1931 –	Japan	Honorary President of Shiseido	8 August 2002
22	Chung Mong-koo	1938 –	South Korea	Chairman & CEO of Hyundai Motor Group	25 June 2003
23	Jacques Jean Marie Rogge	1942 –	Belgium	President of the International Olympic Committee	25 March 2009
23	Juan Antonio Samaranch	1920 – 2010	Spain	Honorary President of the International Olympic Committee	25 March 2009
23	Hein Verbruggen	1941 – 2017	Netherlands	Chairman of the Coordination Commission for the Games of the XXIX Olympiad	25 March 2009
23	Sir Philip Craven	1950 –	United Kingdom	President of the International Paralympic Committee	25 March 2009
23	Dakuya Okada	1925 –	Japan	Honorary President of AEON	25 March 2009
23	Sudono Salim	1916 – 2012	Indonesia	Honorary Chairman of Salim Group	25 March 2009
23	Eka Tjipta Widjaja	1921 – 2019	Indonesia	Chairman of Sinar Mas Group	25 March 2009
30	Tetuo Kadowu	1927 –	Japan	Chairman of Tokyo Japan-China Friendship Association	20 October 2009
31	Stephon Xavier Marbury	1977 –	United States	Basketball player of Beijing Ducks	2 April 2014
32	Lamine Diack	1933 –	Senegal	President of the International Association of Athletics Federations	20 August 2015
33	Tomislav Nikolić	1952 –	Serbia	President of Serbia	30 March 2017
