= Sidney Rittenberg =

American scholar (1921–2019)

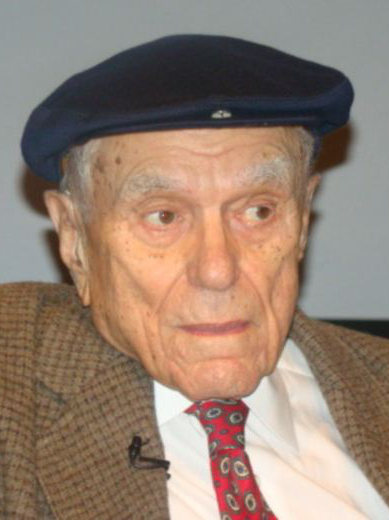
- Sidney Rittenberg in 2012
- Born: 14 August 1921; Charleston, South Carolina
- Died: 24 August 2019 (aged 98)
- Education: Porter-Gaud School
- Alma mater: University of North Carolina at Chapel Hill
- Occupations: Journalist; scholar; linguist
- Political party: Communist Party USA, Chinese Communist Party
Sidney Rittenberg
- Chinese: 李敦白
Transcriptions
Standard Mandarin
- Hanyu Pinyin: Lǐ Dūnbái
- Wade–Giles: Li^{3} Tun^{1}-pai^{2}
Yue: Cantonese
- IPA: [le̬i tɵ́y pàːk]

Sidney Rittenberg (Chinese: 李敦白; pinyin: Lǐ Dūnbái; August 14, 1921 – August 24, 2019) was an American journalist, scholar, and Chinese linguist who lived in China from 1944 to 1980. He worked closely with Mao Zedong, Zhu De, Zhou Enlai, and other leaders of the Chinese Communist Party (CCP) during the Chinese Communist Revolution, staying with them at Yan'an. Working for the Xinhua News Agency and Radio Peking afterwards, much of his time in China was spent in long periods of solitary confinement. According to his book, The Man Who Stayed Behind, Rittenberg was the second American citizen to join the CCP, the first being Ma Haide.

== Early life ==
Rittenberg was born into a Jewish family in Charleston, South Carolina and he lived there until his college studies. He was the son of Muriel (Sluth) and Sidney Rittenberg, who was president of the Charleston City Council. After attending Porter Military Academy, he turned down a full scholarship to Princeton University and instead attended the University of North Carolina at Chapel Hill, where he majored in philosophy. While attending Chapel Hill, he became a member of the Dialectic Society and the US Communist Party. During his college years he was very active in advocating for social causes and organized protests and pickets. He was drafted for the army, studied for a role as a linguist, and sent to China. When he arrived in China, he was sent to bring a $26 check to the family of a girl who was killed by a drunken US soldier. Despite the family's devastation, they gave Rittenberg $6 for his help.

== Interpreting for Mao ==
After World War II ended, Rittenberg chose to stay in China and tried to aid the Chinese Communist Party as he had witnessed the injustices committed under the Chinese Nationalist Party. Rittenberg befriended the communist leader Mao Zedong in the Yan'an caves, which resulted in a lasting relationship with Mao until early days of the Cultural Revolution. He later worked for the Xinhua News Agency and Radio Peking.

Rittenberg was one of the English-language translators for the fourth volume of the Selected Works of Mao Zedong, along with Frank Coe, Solomon Adler, Michael Shapiro, and Israel Epstein.

== Imprisonments ==
During his period in China, Rittenberg was twice imprisoned by the government under suspicion of spying for the American Government. His first imprisonment began in 1949 immediately before the formal surrender of Beijing to the Communists. Rittenberg said he was summoned to the capital and he went, expecting to play a role in promoting the Communist takeover to the rest of the world. In fact, Rittenberg was arrested and placed in solitary confinement, because Stalin had denounced him as a US spy. Rittenberg attributes his survival in solitary confinement to a poem by Edwin Markham:

They drew a circle that shut me out
Heretic, rebel, a thing to flout
But love and I had the wit to win;
We drew a circle that took them in.

This first imprisonment lasted six years and resulted in his wife Wei Lin whom he had met in China divorcing him as she was told nothing about his disappearance. Once he was released he returned to his work promoting the Communist Party.

However, in 1968, he was again imprisoned, this time for 10 years under the same suspicion of spying. His second Chinese wife, Wang Yulin, was also sent to a labor camp for three years due to her being association with the "American spy". He was released in 1977 after the Gang of Four was dismantled and at this point he decided to finally return to America with his wife and kids.

On his release in 1955 and before his second imprisonment, Rittenberg remained a strong supporter of Mao and actively and enthusiastically supported the Great Leap Forward. In a later interview he stated that:

"My loyalty to the ideals of Communism never wavered during those six years in solitary. If anything, it grew stronger. I was determined that I would not let my personal disaster affect my belief in what I thought was true and good."

In 1957, he delivered a eulogy at the funeral of Manya Reiss.

He used his identity as an American-turned-communist in many speeches denouncing capitalism and imperialism and promoting Mao's policies. Later he was a supporter of the Cultural Revolution and briefly associated with Mao's inner circle, leading a group of rebels to take over the state broadcasting institution. On April 8, 1967, the People's Daily published a long article written by him.

== Career as business advisor ==
In the United States after his release, he used his extensive knowledge and contacts in China to advise corporate leaders on how to benefit from China's vast, growing economy. Still welcome in China, he took entrepreneurs on guided tours, introducing them to the country's influential figures.

== See also ==
- Israel Epstein
- Jean Pasqualini
- Sidney Shapiro
- Agnes Smedley
- Edgar Snow
- Anna Louise Strong
