= Shitong Township =

Coordinates: 38.43184°N 114.49912°E

Shitong Township 市同乡
- Township

Chinese transcription(s)
- Interactive map of Shitong Township
- Country: China
- Province: Hebei
- Prefecture: Shijiazhuang
- County: Xingtang County
- Time zone: UTC+8 (China Standard Time)

Shitong Township (Chinese: 市同乡) is a township-level division of Xingtang County, Shijiazhuang, Hebei, China.

== See also ==
- List of township-level divisions of Hebei
