= Zhili Township =

- Township

Chinese transcription(s)
  - Chinese: 只里乡
  - Pinyin: Zhīlǐ Xiāng
- Location in China
- Coordinates: 38°24′31″N 114°35′11″E
- Country: China
- Province: Hebei
- Prefecture: Shijiazhuang
- County: Xingtang County
- Time zone: UTC+8 (China Standard Time)

Zhili Township (Chinese: 只里乡) is a township-level division of Xingtang County, Shijiazhuang, Hebei, China. The principal town is Zhilixiang and lies southeast of Xingtang Town, about a quarter of the way along the road from there to Xinle in the southeast. The township has an area of 60.79 square kilometres.

== See also ==
- List of township-level divisions of Hebei
