= Louise Olivereau =

American anarchist

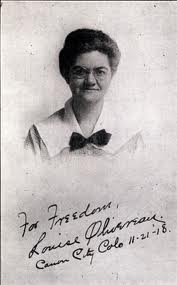
- Portrait of Olivereau, 1918
- Born: 1884; Douglas, United States
- Died: San Francisco, United States
- Organization: IWW
- Movement: Anarchism
- Criminal charges: Interference with the draft
- Criminal penalty: 10 years imprisonment
- Criminal status: Served 28 months

Louise Olivereau (1884-1963) was an American anarchist and war resister. She was a trained stenographer and worked for the Industrial Workers of the World in their Seattle office. It was raided in 1917 during World War I because the group opposed the war. She was charged with and convicted of violation of the Espionage Act of 1917. On November 30, 1917, she was convicted and given a ten-year sentence, for “interference with the draft,” for printing a small leaflet advising young men of their legal rights in relation to claiming an exemption from the draft. She served 28 months of the sentence before being released in March 1920.
