= Shubin (given name) =

Several Chinese given names (树斌, 舒賓(舒宾)) are transliterated as Shubin. Notable people with the name include:

- Li Shubin (born 1955), Chinese football manager and former player
- Zhang Shubin (born 1966), retired Chinese figure skater
- Nie Shubin (1974–1995), Chinese man wrongfully executed for a rape and murder
