= Joel Shubin =

Russian journalist (died 1942)

Joel Shubin (died 24 March 1942) was a Russian agronomist, journalist, and an alleged Communist International representative to the American Communist Party. At one time, he served as the Soviet Deputy Minister of Agriculture.

== Biography ==
Born Jewish, Shubin edited the Moscow-based Peasant Gazette in the 1930s. A widower with a teenage daughter, he married the American journalist Anna Louise Strong without ceremony in 1931, and they remained married for the rest of his life. At the time, Strong edited the English-language version of another Soviet newspaper, Moscow News. While Shubin often accompanied Strong during her trips back to the United States, the two were often separated due to work commitments. According to Rewi Alley's account, Strong later said: "perhaps we married because we were both so doggone lonely...but we were very happy."

Shubin died of a lung disease under mysterious circumstances on 24 March 1942. Strong, who was working in California at the time, didn't learn of her husband's death until that August.
