= David Crook =

British activist and spy (1910–2000)

- David Crook in Madrid, 1937
- Born: 14 August 1910; London, England
- Died: 1 November 2000 (aged 90); Beijing, China
- Education: Columbia University (BA)
- Occupations: Author, spy, teacher
- Political party: Communist Party of Great Britain; Chinese Communist Party
- Spouse: Isabel Brown (m. 1942)
- Children: 3
- Military career
- Allegiance: International Brigades
- Conflicts: Spanish Civil War

David Crook (14 August 1910 – 1 November 2000) was a British communist who spent most of his life teaching in China. A committed Marxist from 1931, he joined the International Brigades to fight against the Spanish nationalists in the Spanish Civil War (1936–1939). After being wounded in combat, he was recruited by the NKVD, the Soviet secret police, and was sent to China during the Second Sino-Japanese War (1937–1945). There he met and married his wife, Isabel, a teacher and social activist. Following the Second World War and the Chinese Civil War, the couple stayed in China and taught English.

In 1959, the Crooks published Revolution in a Chinese Village, Ten Mile Inn and in 1966 came The First Years of Yangyi Commune. The British sinologist Delia Davin wrote that through that "classic study" and other writings and talks, the Crooks "provided a positive picture of China to the outside world at a time when cold war simplifications were the norm." The Communist Party of Great Britain (Marxist-Leninist) called Revolution a "seminal work, which has been bringing the achievements and challenges of the Chinese agrarian revolution to life for English-speaking readers since 1959." Crook died at 90 after spending his last five decades in China, his political beliefs largely unshaken despite five years' imprisonment during the Cultural Revolution (1966–1976).

== Early life and education ==
Crook was born in London in 1910. "My father was a Jewish cockney Royalist, raised in the East End of London, by immigrant parents who fled Czarist Russia to avoid anti-semitism and conscription into a pork-eating army," wrote Crook in his autobiography. Crook was educated at Cheltenham College and graduated from Columbia University in 1935 where he participated in protests on campus against Nazi Germany.

== International communist ==
After being wounded on his first day at the front in Spain, he was returned to a hospital in Madrid. While in Madrid, he was recruited by the NKVD to spy on those whom the Stalinists called Trotskyites, a group which included George Orwell. Crook later expressed regret for his part in the crushing of the Workers' Party of Marxist Unification (POUM).

The NKVD then sent him to China. There he taught English at Saint John's University, Shanghai to spy on a Trotskyite whose arguments in fact began to convince him. Crook proceeded to Chengdu and was there when it was bombed by the Japanese. While there he met his future wife, Isabel Brown, daughter of Canadian missionaries.

Hitler's invasion of Russia in June 1941 ended Crook's fling with Trotskyism. Upon his return to England, Crook re-joined the Communist Party of Great Britain and joined the Royal Air Force, then married Isabel. During the war, he worked for British intelligence throughout Asia and contacted local communist movements.

== Life in China ==
After studies at the University of London, the Crooks returned to China to teach English in a rural school that trained staff for the foreign service of the future government. They observed and participated in the land reform movements carried out by the Chinese Communist Party in North China villages and produced a "thick description" which they published in their widely cited Ten Mile Village (1959). They entered Beijing with the victorious Communists at "Liberation" in 1949 and for the next forty years, the Crooks taught at the Peking First Foreign Languages Institute (now the Beijing Foreign Studies University).

Despite his long-time loyalty to the Chinese Communist Party, Crook was imprisoned in 1967 by Red Guards during the Cultural Revolution. When he was freed almost 6 years later in 1973, he found his captors sincere but misguided. After his death, his wife told China Daily that "He was well aware that 'revolution is not a dinner party' so he never blamed China for his lengthy stay in Qincheng prison."

In 1979 his The Chinese-English Dictionary was published by Shangwu Yinshuguan (Chubanshe), in China.

Crook was convinced by reading George Orwell, on whom he had spied in Spain in the 1930s. In 1989, the Crooks criticized the suppression of the Tiananmen Square protests. Crook remarked in his autobiography, written in 1990, that he still believed what he mentioned in his 75th birthday (in 1985) speech: "Some people say they are disillusioned by the negative aspects of Chinese society today. But Chairman Mao said (in 1949) our past work is only the first step on a long march of 10,000 li ... Over the years I have come to realize that the re-making of a society of hundreds of millions of people, steeped in centuries of feudalism, cannot be accomplished quickly and easily, without setbacks and mistakes. But I am confident that by the end of this century - which with a bit of luck I may live to see ... this China, which Isabel and I love, which has become our second homeland, will be creating a strong socialist society, and in the course of its modernization will strive to avoid the evils, suffering, ugliness and injustice which have beset modernization elsewhere."

He died in Beijing on November 1, 2000, at the age of 90. Beijing Foreign Studies University erected a bronze bust of him on the campus. The front of the statue's stone base is engraved with the following words mainly in accordance with his will: "In memory of David Crook (1910-2000). British, Jewish, Communist. Friend of the Chinese people. Teacher of Beijing Foreign Studies University and its forerunners since 1948".

== Personal life ==
Crook had three children with his wife, Isabel. Crook died in Beijing in 2000. One of his sons, Paul Crook, has given extensive interviews about his experience growing up as a foreigner in China during the Cultural Revolution.

== Publications ==
- Isabel Crook and David Crook. Revolution in a Chinese Village, Ten Mile Inn. (London,: Routledge and Paul, International Library of Sociology and Social Reconstruction, 1959. ISBN 0710033931.
- Isabel Crook and David Crook. The First Years of Yangyi Commune. (London,: Routledge & K. Paul, International Library of Sociology and Social Reconstruction, 1966. ISBN
- Isabel Crook and David Crook. Ten Mile Inn : Mass Movement in a Chinese Village. (New York: Pantheon Books, The Pantheon Asia Library 1st, 1979. ISBN 0394411781
- 北京外国语大学英语系词典组. Chinese-English Dictionary. 外语教学与研究出版社, 1994. ISBN 7560007392.
