= Peter Deyneka =

Russian-American evangelist (1897-1987)

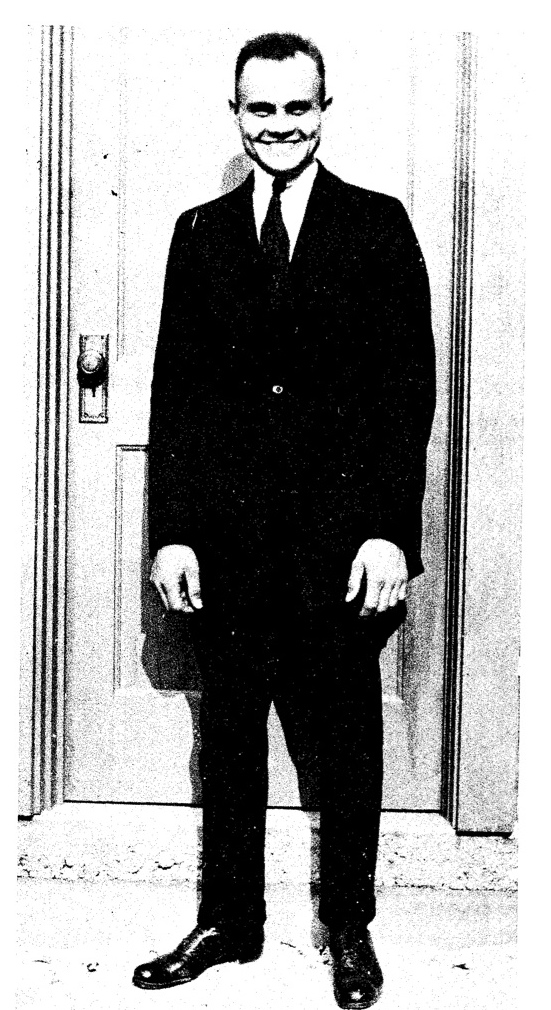
- Peter Deyneka shortly after his conversion in 1920
- Born: July 12, 1897
- Died: July 29, 1987 (aged 90)
- Education: St. Paul Bible School
- Spouse: Vera Demidovich (m. 1926)

Peter N. Deyneka Sr. (July 12, 1897 – July 29, 1987) was a Russian-American evangelist and a missionary to the Russian diaspora. Born in what is present-day Belarus, Deyneka immigrated to Chicago in 1914, where he worked in a machine shop. Reared in the Russian Orthodox Church and briefly claiming to be an atheist, Deyneka was converted to evangelical Christianity in 1920 under the ministry of Paul Rader at Moody Memorial Church.

Believing that he was called to evangelize his own people, Deyneka attended Moody Bible Institute and graduated from St. Paul Bible School in 1925 as valedictorian. When he returned to the Soviet Union he discovered only his mother and one brother were alive; his father, three brothers, and two sisters had starved to death during the Russian famine of 1921. Deyneka married Vera Demidovich on May 23, 1926, before working in Latvia and Estonia as field secretary for the All-Russian Evangelical Union and then engaging in a number of preaching tours to the worldwide Russian diaspora.

In January 1934, he and three other men formed a committee to support his work. Two years later, they incorporated as the Russian Gospel Association, the name of which was changed to the Slavic Gospel Association (SGA) in 1949.

Deyneka wrote several books, including an autobiography. In 1975, he retired as general director of the Slavic Gospel Association and was succeeded by his son, Peter Deyneka Jr. (1931-2000).
