= Mikhail Shubin (triathlete) =

Russian triathlete

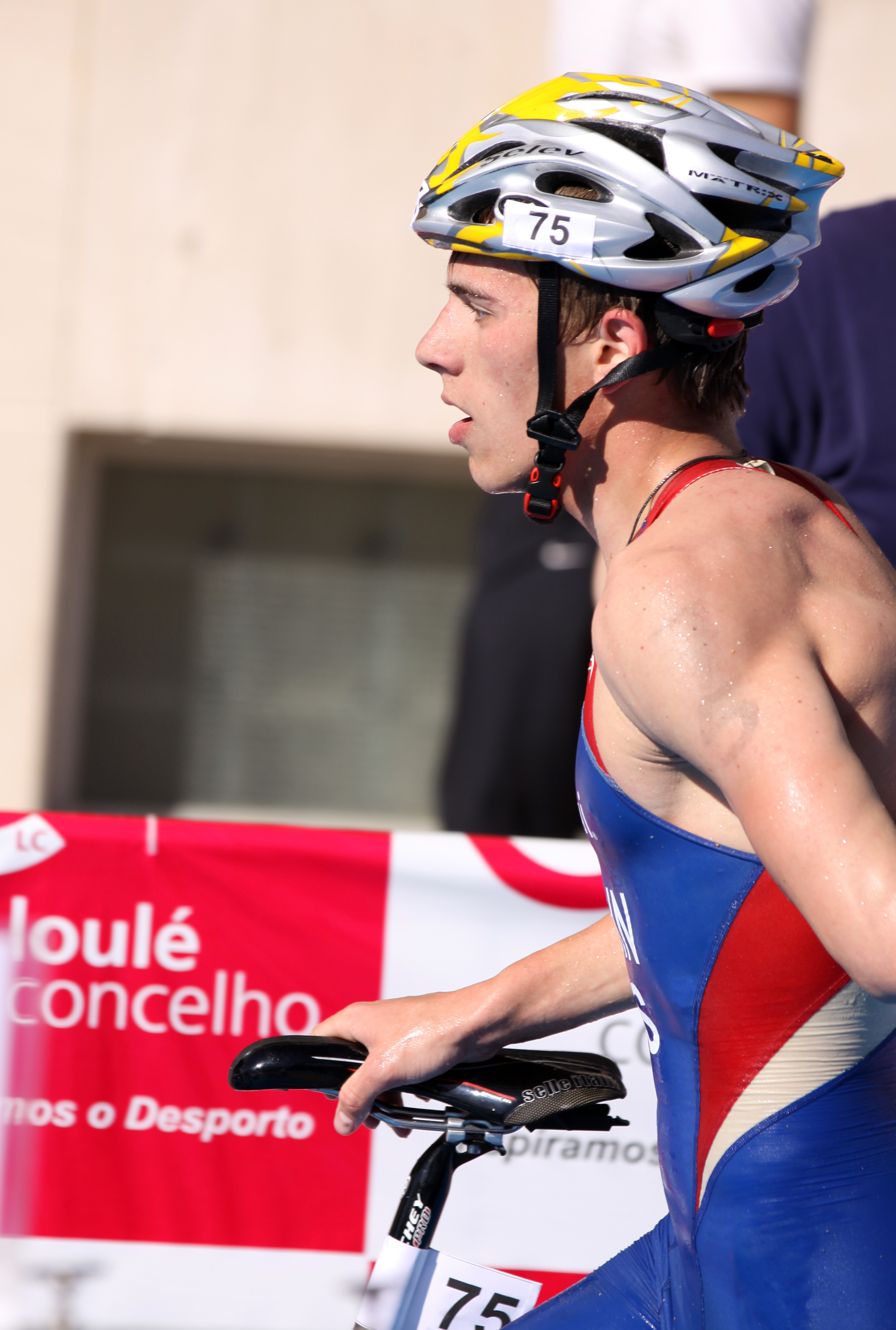
Mikhail Shubin at the European Cup elite triathlon in Quarteira, 2011.

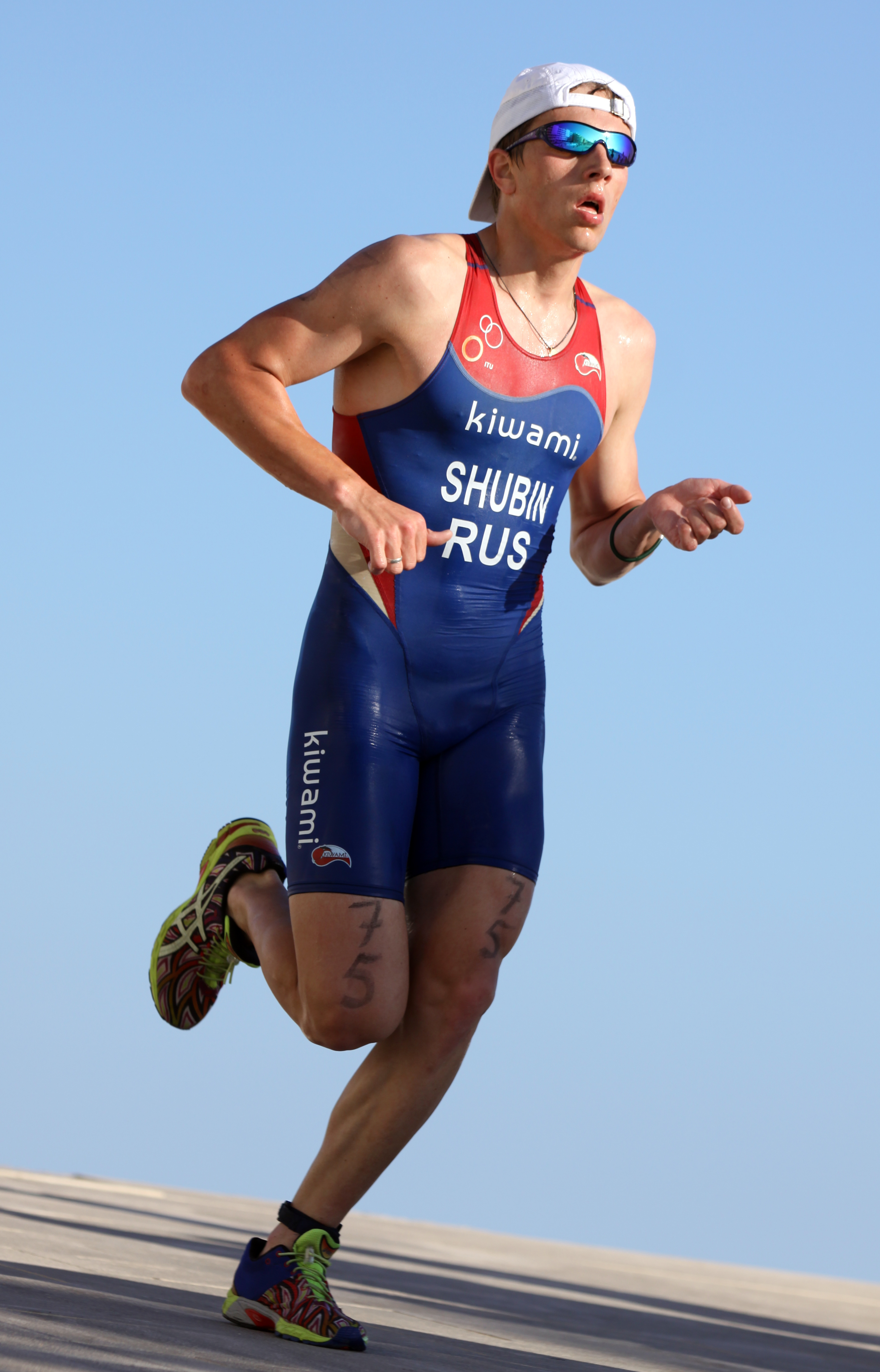
Mikhail Shubin at the European Cup elite triathlon in Quarteira, 2011.

Mikhail Shubin (Russian: Михаил Шубин; born 28 July 1988) is a Russian professional triathlete. Since September 2007, Shubin has held the title of Master of Sport.

At the Russian Championships in 2010, Shubin placed 8th (U23/Olympic Distance) in Penza. From 2004, Shubin achieved several top ten positions in the Junior / U23 triathlete category (Юниоры). That year, he placed 10th in the Russian rankings (Рейтинг); in 2006, he placed 6th at the Summer Spartaciad and 4th at the Russian Duathlon Championships; in 2007, he was 6th at the Russian Triathlon Championships and 2nd at the Grand Final of the Russian Cup. In 2008, Shubin changed to the Elite category and placed 13th at the Duathlon Championships.

In 2010, Shubin also competed in several triathlons in France: Le Mans (4 July 2010), Aiguillon sur Mer (25 July 2010), and St. Jean de Monts (26 July 2010), placing 7th, 3rd, and 17th respectively. At the Triathlon de Paris (18 July 2010), Shubin placed 4th. In 2011, Shubin represented La Rochelle Triathlon, taking part in some international non-ITU events, including the Triathlon de Alpiarça (20 March 2011), where he placed 25th.

== ITU competitions ==
The following list is based upon the official International Triathlon Union (ITU) rankings and the ITU Athletes's Profile Page. Unless indicated otherwise, the following events are triathlons (Olympic Distance) and refer to the Elite category.

Date	Competition	Place	Rank
2003-10-22	European Cup	Alanya	32
2005-07-24	European Championships (Youth/Relay)	Alexandroupoli(s)	1
2006-10-18	European Cup (Junior)	Alanya	6
2007-05-20	European Cup and Small States of Europe Championships	Limassol	23
2007-07-21	European Cup (Junior)	Kuopio	2
2007-10-24	European Cup (Junior)	Alanya	6
2009-08-02	European Cup	Egirdir	23
2011-04-09	European Cup	Quarteira	46
