= Charles McGonigal =

Former FBI official (born 1968)

Charles F. McGonigal
- Born: June 23, 1968 (age 58)
- Education: Kent State University (B.B.A.) Johns Hopkins University (M.A.)
- Employer: FBI (1996-2018)
- Status: Incarcerated
- Convictions: Conspiring to Violate U.S. Sanctions on Russia; Concealing Information from the FBI
- Penalty: 78 months in prison

Details
- Imprisoned at: FCI Cumberland

Charles McGonigal (born June 23, 1968) is a former American Federal Bureau of Investigation special agent in charge of counterintelligence in the FBI's New York City field office. In 2016 and 2017, as a supervisor in the New York Office, he led investigations into Russian interference in the 2016 United States elections and Russian efforts to aid Donald Trump’s 2016 presidential campaign, including by Russian oligarch Oleg Deripaska. In December 2023 McGonigal was sentenced to 50 months in prison for conspiring with Deripaska to violate U.S. sanctions on Russia. In February 2024, McGonigal was sentenced to an additional 28 months in prison for concealing payments he received from a former Albanian intelligence employee. During McGonigal’s time in a supervisory position in the New York Field Office, the office was marked by controversial leaks.

== Education ==
In 1990, McGonigal was awarded a B.B.A. from Kent State University, later earning an M.A. in government from Johns Hopkins University in 2015.

== Career ==
=== Federal Bureau of Investigation ===
McGonigal joined the Federal Bureau of Investigation in 1996, working in New York, Washington, Baltimore and Cleveland.

At the start of his career, McGonigal worked on the investigation into the 1996 TWA Flight 800 crash headed by the boss of the New York office, James Kallstrom; Kallstrom was close to both then-Mayor Rudy Giuliani and real estate developer Donald Trump. “We just got to be friends,” said Kallstrom of Trump in a 2020 interview.

In 2002, McGonigal was appointed a supervisory special agent in the Counter-Espionage Section at FBI Headquarters.

In 2006, he became field supervisor of a counter-espionage squad at the Washington Field Office. He was one of the original case agents assigned to the Illegals Program.

McGonigal led the 2010 investigation into the United States diplomatic cables leak of over 200,000 State Department documents, and the investigation into Chelsea Manning's collaboration with WikiLeaks.

By early 2016, McGonigal was running the bureau's Cyber-Counterintelligence Coordination Section in Washington, where agents analyzed Russian and Chinese hacking and other foreign intelligence activities. In that senior position, Mr. McGonigal became aware of the initial criminal referral that led to the investigation known as Crossfire Hurricane into contacts between the Trump campaign and Russia in the 2016 election.

On October 4, 2016, FBI Director James B. Comey appointed McGonigal "Special Agent in Charge of the Counterintelligence Division for the New York Field Office”. McGonigal was an expert on Russian intelligence activities targeting the United States, as well as U.S. efforts to recruit Russian spies. As head of counterintelligence efforts in New York, McGonigal was involved in some of the bureau's most sensitive work, including Crossfire Hurricane.

==== Investigation of Oleg Deripaska ====
McGonigal supervised and participated in investigations of Russian oligarchs, including Oleg Deripaska, a close ally of Russian President Vladimir Putin, who figured repeatedly in U.S. investigations into contacts between Russia and the Trump Campaign. On August 15, 2023, McGonigal would plead guilty to federal charges of conspiring with Deripaska to violate the International Emergency Economic Powers Act (IEEPA) and money laundering.

In a February 7, 2023 letter to the Department of Justice requesting information after McGonigal’s arrest, Senator Sheldon Whitehouse wrote,

“The situation is even more troubling given that McGonigal was arrested for, among other things, allegedly working with Russian oligarch Oleg Deripaska, whom McGonigal was assigned to investigate while working for the FBI. Deripaska, a known associate of Trump 2016 campaign chairman Paul Manafort, was sanctioned for interfering with the 2016 presidential election to help Donald Trump.”

According to Yale professor Timothy Snyder, a leading authority on Russia and Ukraine, “Russia was backing Trump in much the way that it had once backed Ukrainian president Viktor Yanukovych” in the 2010 Ukrainian presidential election. Deripaska had financed and coordinated the political operation to install Yanukovych, and hired Paul Manafort to run Yanukovych’s campaign. The same Paul Manafort was now running Trump’s presidential campaign.

On October 30, 2017, Manafort was indicted by a federal grand jury and arrested by the FBI as part of Special Counsel Robert Mueller's investigation into the Trump campaign. Manafort was charged with conspiracy against the United States, conspiracy to launder money, acting as an unregistered foreign agent, and making false statements. Prosecutors claimed Manafort laundered more than $18 million he’d received from Deripaska as compensation for lobbying and consulting services in Yanukovych’s campaign.

In 2016, when McGonigal was investigating Deripaska, the FBI was aware that Manafort owed Deripaska millions of dollars; and that Manafort had provided the Russian oligarch with election information as a way of paying off the debt. On August 2, 2016, Manafort and Rick Gates had met with Deripaska associate Konstantin Kilimnik (a Russian Intelligence agent according to the US Government) at the Grand Havana Room at 666 Fifth Avenue owned by Jared Kushner’s family. At the meeting, Manafort passed internal Trump Campaign polling data to Kilimnik. This internal Trump Campaign polling data would have aided the Russian Internet Research Agency, run by Russian oligarch Yevgeny Prigozhin, in focusing its online election interference efforts. On 16 February 2018, a United States grand jury indicted 13 Russian nationals, including Prigozhin, and three Russian entities, including the Internet Research Agency, on charges of violating criminal laws with the intent to interfere "with U.S. elections and political processes".

==== Inspector General's report ====
In September 2025, an Inspector General's report determined that McGonigal had leaked sensitive, non-public information concerning the FBI's investigation into CEFC China Energy (CEFC). Specifically, beginning on June 12, 2017, and until at least November 2017, McGonigal told Dorian Ducka, an employee of CEFC and a non-governmental advisor to Albanian Prime Minister Edi Rama, about the anticipated arrests of Patrick Ho, Ye Jianming, as well as several other foreign nationals associated with CEFC.

==== Leaks from the New York Office ====
In a February 7, 2023 letter to the Department of Justice requesting information about McGonigal, Senator Sheldon Whitehouse wrote,

“Because McGonigal was the Special Agent in Charge of the FBI’s New York Field Office counterintelligence division in the weeks leading to the 2016 election, he may have knowledge of or have participated in political activities to damage then-candidate Hillary Clinton and help then-candidate Donald Trump. For instance, during that time period, Rudy Giuliani announced that a “big surprise” related to Secretary Clinton would be forthcoming from the FBI, hinting he received that information from the New York Field Office.1 The very next day, Director James Comey, reportedly bowing to internal pressure from that office, broke the FBI’s ordinary policy of declining to comment on ongoing matters close to an election and announced the FBI would reopen its investigation into Secretary Clinton’s use of a private email server.”

During his time in a senior position in the New York Field Office, McGonigal was perfectly positioned to have knowledge of or have participated in these leaks. “After assuming his new job in October 2016, just a month before the election, [McGonigal] would have been in a position to undermine the bureau’s investigation into Deripaska and Manafort and to sabotage those investigations with disinformation. Similarly, he would have been in a position to leak the information [to Rudy Giuliani and Devin Nunez] about Anthony Weiner’s laptop that led to the reopening of the FBI probe into Hillary Clinton’s emails 11 days before the election. Finally, he was in a position to have been a source behind the false exculpatory news published by The New York Times on October 31, 2016, a week before the election, with the headline that seemed to give to Trump a clean bill of health: “Investigating Donald Trump, F.B.I. Sees No Clear Link to Russia.””

Senior FBI Special Agent Johnathan Buma played a pivotal role in the Bureau’s investigation into Giuliani for illegal foreign-lobbying activity and campaign-finance violations. Buma drew scrutiny during Trump’s first term for reportedly saying during a presentation that he believed Giuliani may have been compromised by a Russian counter-influence operation—concerns that were immediately shut down by his superiors. In a twenty-two-page whistleblower statement, Buma alleged that agency leaders had moved repeatedly to quash his investigation into Russian and Ukrainian ties to Giuliani. Buma’s whistleblower statement singled out McGonigal by name as one of the agency leaders who had run interference for Giuliani. In March, 2025, Buma was arrested and charged with "illegally disclosing confidential documents."

From spring 2016 through late 2018, during his time in the New York Office, McGonigal was in a relationship with Allison Guerriero, who was a friend of Rudy Giuliani. Guerriero has stated on social media that were no connections between Giuliani and McGonigal.

In March 2017, McGonigal expressed concern in a text message to then-FBI Deputy Assistant Director of the Counterintelligence Division Jennifer Boone that the surveillance warrant application on Carter Page could leak to the public after being presented to the United States House Permanent Select Committee on Intelligence.

McGonigal retired from the FBI in 2018.

=== Private sector ===
In September 2018, McGonigal was hired as a vice-president at Brookfield Properties.

In the spring of 2022, McGonigal was hired as the global head of security for Aman Resorts. McGonigal's hiring was done through a very obscure process and raised many eyebrows there, according to Aman staffers, as the previous director of corporate security had been reassigned for no apparent reason, and McGonigal continued to be retained by the company even after news first surfaced that he was under investigation.

== Federal charges ==
In January 2023, McGonigal was arrested and indicted on federal charges of money laundering, making false statements in mandatory disclosures to the FBI, violating U.S. sanctions on Russia, and other counts. The indictment alleged that McGonigal worked with Russian oligarch Oleg Deripaska, whom McGonigal had investigated as part of the FBI's Operation Crossfire Hurricane. Deripaska tasked McGonigal with investigating one of Deripaska's rivals. McGonigal used shell companies to conduct his business with Deripaska.

According to the U.S. Department of the Treasury's Office of Foreign Assets Control, Deripaska is an agent of Vladimir Putin. Deripaska played a key role in financing Putin's efforts to take over Ukraine from within via a political operation directed by Paul Manafort that put Putin surrogate Viktor Yanukovych in the Ukraine presidency in 2010.

McGonigal was separately indicted for allegedly accepting payments amounting to more than US$225,000 from a former Albanian intelligence employee and acting to advance that person's interests. Days after his arrest, McGonigal was released on $500,000 bond after pleading not guilty.

The FBI's investigation into McGonigal reportedly began sometime in 2018, after McGonigal was seen meeting with a Russian contact who was under surveillance by British authorities.

On August 15, 2023, McGonigal pleaded guilty to federal charges of conspiring to violate the International Emergency Economic Powers Act (IEEPA) and money laundering in connection with a 2021 agreement to provide services to Deripaska, a sanctioned Russian oligarch.

In December 2023, McGonigal was sentenced to four years in prison after pleading guilty to working for Deripaska.

In February 2024, McGonigal was sentenced to an additional 28 months in prison for concealing the payments he received from Agron Neza, a former Albanian intelligence employee.

== Personal life ==
McGonigal and his wife Pamela have two children. They have a home in Chevy Chase, Maryland. McGonigal's family did not accompany him during his counterintelligence tour in New York.

From around spring 2017 to late 2018, McGonigal reportedly maintained an extramarital relationship with Allison Guerriero, a resident of Florham Park, New Jersey who socialized with law enforcement officers. During the affair, McGonigal and Guerriero frequently stayed at his apartment in the Park Slope neighborhood of Brooklyn, New York.

In 2021, when Guerriero was badly burned during a fire at her father's house, Rudy Giuliani, whom she knew from law-enforcement circles, let her stay in a guest bedroom at his home. Since then, Guerriero has been a frequent on-air caller to Giuliani's radio shows. Allison Guerriero was found dead on August 27, 2026.

McGonigal kept framed portraits of himself shaking hands with Albanian Prime Minister Edi Rama as well as former Kosovo Prime Minister Ramush Haradinaj in his home office.
