= Deng Rong =

Chinese politician (born 1950)

- 邓榕
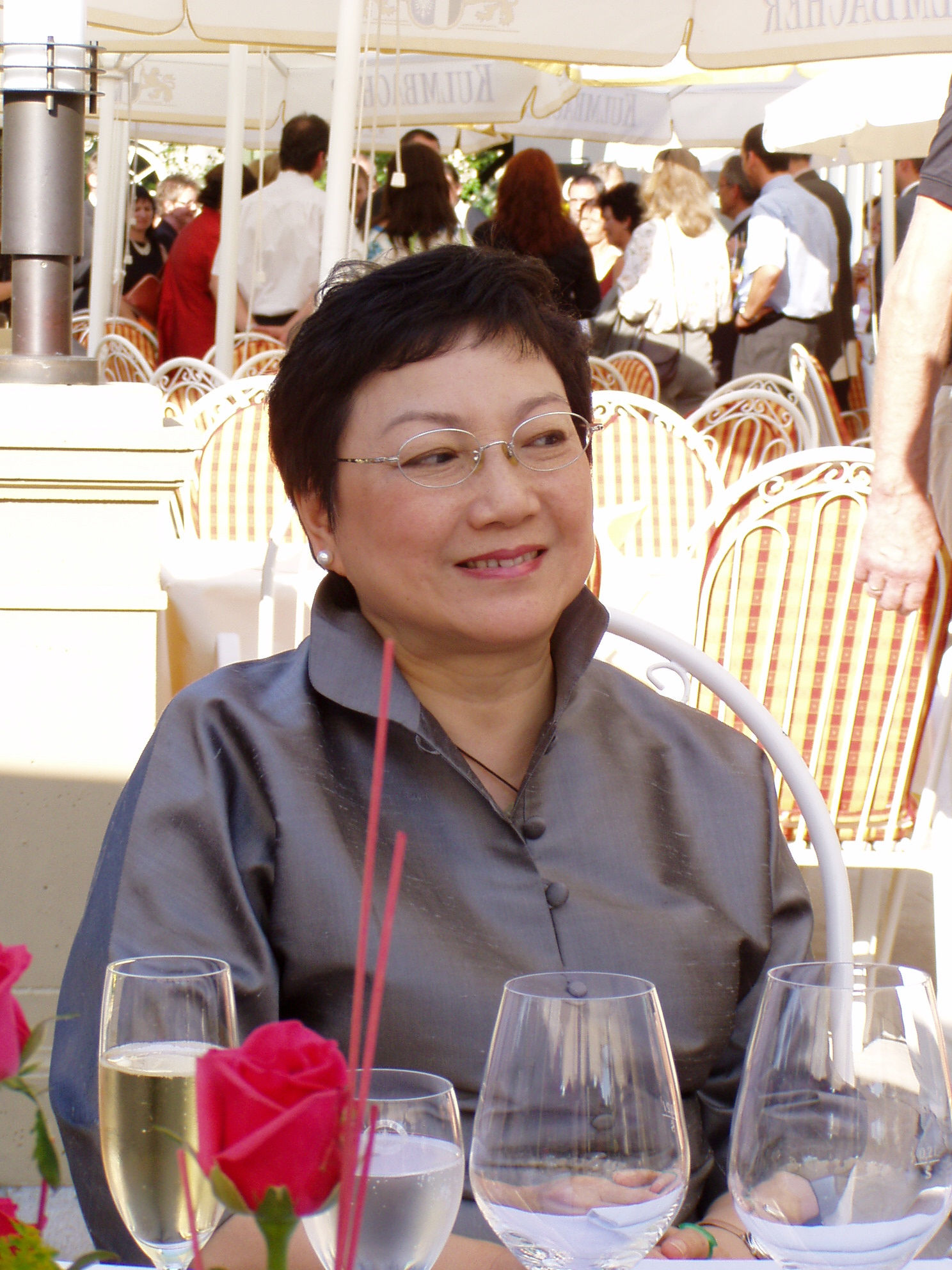
- Deng Rong in Bad Kissingen, Germany, in 2006

Vice President of the China Association for International Friendly Contact
- Incumbent
- Assumed office 1990

Personal details
- Born: January 1950 (age 76) Chongqing, China
- Party: Chinese Communist Party
- Spouse: He Ping
- Children: Zhuo Yue
- Parent(s): Deng Xiaoping; Zhuo Lin
- Relatives: Deng family
- Education: Beijing Medical College

Chinese name
- Simplified Chinese: 邓榕
- Traditional Chinese: 鄧榕
Transcriptions
Standard Mandarin
- Hanyu Pinyin: Dèng Róng
- IPA: [tə̂ŋ ɻʊ̌ŋ]

Deng Rong (Chinese: 邓榕; pinyin: Dèng Róng, born January 1950) is a Chinese politician and the third daughter of paramount leader Deng Xiaoping.

She has been accused of playing a key role in the cover-up of the 1966 killing of Bian Zhongyun by Red Guards (Deng was a prominent student leader of the Red Guards at the time).

== Early life ==
Deng is the youngest child of Deng Xiaoping and his third wife, Zhuo Lin. She has two older sisters, Deng Lin and Deng Nan, as well as two older brothers, Deng Pufang and Deng Zhifang. Within the family, she was known as Mao Mao.

Deng stated in an interview in 2004 that her father never spoke of official business at home and that her siblings and herself had no idea what Deng Xiaoping did at work, even though several guards stood sentry in their courtyard home.

During one of the most severe flooding incidents in Henan in August 1975 (Banqiao Dam failure), Li Xiannian called Deng Xiaoping to inform him that several dams had burst. Deng Rong answered the phone and refused to allow Li to speak with her father. In the first call, she said that Deng Xiaoping was sleeping; on the second call, she hung up. The paramount leader was allegedly playing Mahjong at the time. This was one of the reasons Deng Xiaoping was criticized for delaying rescue operations.

=== Killing of Bian Zhongyun ===
While enrolled at the Girls' Middle School in Beijing during the early stages of the Cultural Revolution, Deng was a prominent student leader of the Red Guards. The Middle School teacher Bian Zhongyun was beaten to death by Red Guards in the summer of 1966, making her an early victim of the Cultural Revolution. Shortly after the killing, Deng Rong tried to pressure a hospital into carrying out an autopsy and producing a death certificate stating that Bian died from a heart attack. The hospital finally issued a certificate that listed the death cause as "Unknown". The books Deng later wrote make no mention of the killing of Bian or her own role in it.

== Career ==
When the People's Republic of China and United States established diplomatic relations in 1979, Deng was sent by her father to the Chinese Embassy in the US. She worked there for two years.

From 1984 to 1990, Deng held the official position of Deputy Director of the Policy Research Office of the General Office of the National People's Congress. She also served as Deng Xiaoping's confidential secretary from early 1989. Since 1990, she has served as the vice president of the China Association for International Friendly Contact.

In 1992, Deng accompanied her father on his southern tour. Among Deng Xiaoping's family members on the tour, Deng Rong was the most visibly prominent.

== Writing ==
Deng published books titled Deng Xiaoping: My Father (Chinese: 我的父亲邓小平) (1993) and Deng Xiaoping and the Cultural Revolution (2000). A once-planned third volume about her father has not been published as of 2024.

Deng has also given interviews revealing details of her father's personal life and personality.

Deng has sued a publisher in Liaoning over the alleged unauthorized publishing of her biographies.

== Awards ==
- Knight Grand Cross of the Order of Merit of the Italian Republic (Italy, 2005)
- Order of Friendship (Russia, 1999)
