= Family of Deng Xiaoping =

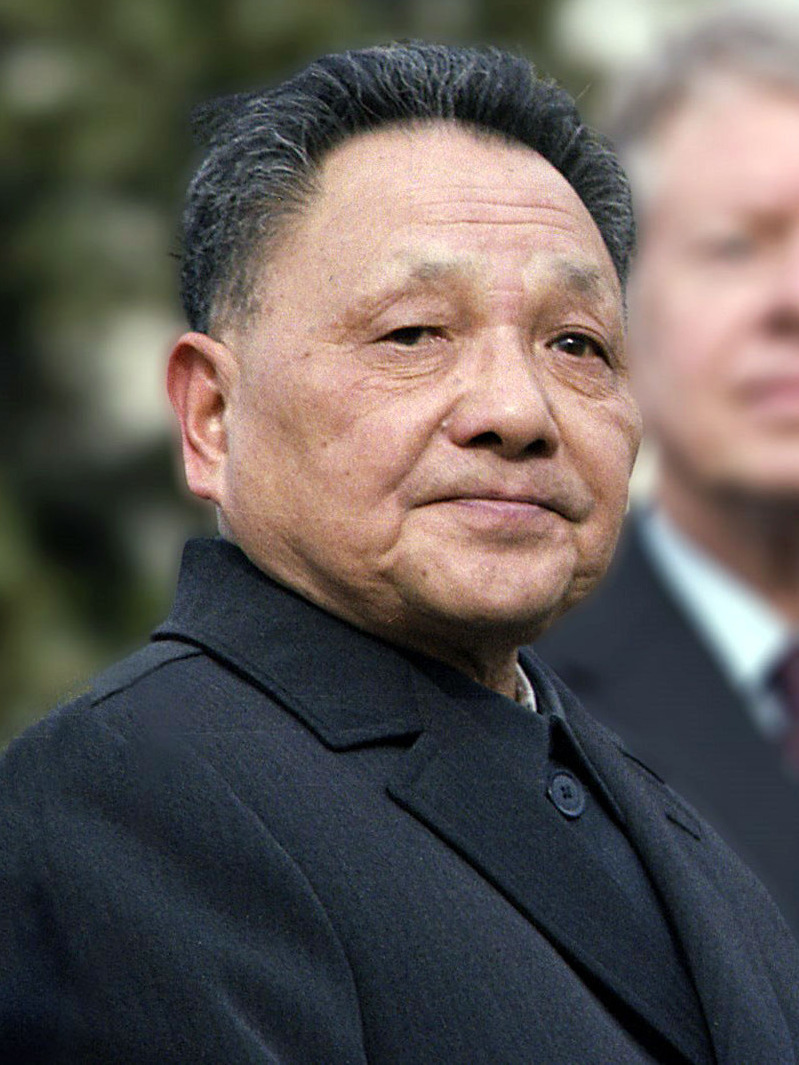
- Deng Xiaoping
- Current region: Beijing, China
- Origin: China
- Founder: Deng Xiaoping

The family of Deng Xiaoping is a prominent political Chinese family. The most well-known member is Deng Xiaoping, who led the People's Republic of China from 1978 until 1989.

== Ancestors ==
Deng's ancestors can be traced back to Jiaying County (now renamed as Meixian), Guangdong, a prominent ancestral area for the Hakka people, and had settled in Sichuan for several generations. Deng's daughter Deng Rong wrote in the book My Father Deng Xiaoping (我的父亲邓小平) that his ancestry was probably, but not definitely, Hakka. Sichuan was originally the origin of the Deng lineage until one of them was hired as an official in Guangdong during the Ming dynasty, but when the Qing dynasty planned to increase the population in 1671, they moved back to Sichuan. Deng was born in Guang'an District, Guang'an on 22 August 1904 in Sichuan province.

Deng's father, Deng Wenming, was a mid-level landowner who had studied at the University of Law and Political Science in Chengdu, Sichuan. He was locally prominent. His mother, surnamed Dan, died early in Deng's life, leaving Deng, his three brothers, and three sisters.

== Wives ==
Deng's first wife, one of his schoolmates from Moscow, died aged 24 a few days after giving birth to their first child, a baby girl who also died.

=== Jin Weiying ===
Jin met Deng Xiaoping in 1931 in the Central Soviet Area of Shanghai. They married in Ruijin during the summer 1932, but he fell into political disfavour, and they had divorced before 1934.

=== Zhuo Lin ===
Zhuo Lin became a member of the Communist Party in 1938, and married Deng a year later in front of Mao's cave dwelling in Yan'an. She was the daughter of an industrialist in Yunnan.

== Brothers ==
Deng had three brothers:

=== Deng Ken ===
Deng Ken joined the Chinese Communist Party in his youth, carving out his own distinct administrative and political career. Following the establishment of the People's Republic of China, he served in several prominent regional government roles, most notably as the Vice Mayor of Wuhan and later as the Vice Governor of Hubei.

=== Deng Xianqing ===
Due to his extreme low profile, nothing much is known about Deng Xianqing.

=== Deng Shuping ===
Deng Shuping pursued a career in local administration and eventually served as a county magistrate and senior regional official in Guizhou. However, his family connection to Deng Xiaoping became a tragic liability during the political upheaval of the Cultural Revolution. Targeted by political factions following Deng Xiaoping’s purge, he suffered severe persecution and harassment, which ultimately led to his suicide in 1967.

== Children ==
Deng and Zhuo Lin had five children: three daughters (Deng Lin, Deng Nan and Deng Rong) and two sons (Deng Pufang and Deng Zhifang).

=== Deng Nan ===
Deng Nan is a Chinese politician and physicist. She studied physics at Peking University from 1964 to 1970. She served as vice minister of China's State Science and Technology Commission from 1998 to 2004.

=== Deng Rong ===
Deng Rong is the third daughter of Deng Xiaoping. When the People's Republic of China and United States established diplomatic relations in 1979, Deng was sent by her father to the Chinese Embassy in the US. She worked there for two years. From 1984 to 1990, Deng held the official position of deputy director of the Policy Research Office of the General Office of the National People's Congress. She also served as Deng Xiaoping's confidential secretary from early 1989. Since 1990, she has served as the vice president of the China Association for International Friendly Contact.

=== Deng Pufang ===
Deng Pufang is the eldest son of Deng Xiaoping. During the Cultural Revolution, he was injured by the Red Guards and became a paraplegic. He has since dedicated his life to improving the rights of people with disabilities. In 1984, he established and became a vice president of the China Welfare Fund for the Disabled. From 1988 to 2008, he served as the president of the China Disabled Persons' Federation, and its honorary chairman from 2008 to 2023.

== Other relatives ==
=== Deng Zhuodi ===
Deng Zhuodi is the grandson of Deng Xiaoping. From 2003 to 2007, he studied at the Peking University Law School. After graduation, he attended Duke University School of Law from 2007 to 2008. After his graduation from Duke with master of law degree, he worked at a law firm in Wall Street, New York City. Deng was appointed deputy head of Pingguo County in Guangxi Zhuang Autonomous Region in 2013. From 2014 to 2016, he served as the secretary of the party committee of Xin'an town in Pingguo County. In 2016, Deng served as the deputy secretary of the party committee of Pingguo County and secretary of the party committee of Xin'an town. In March 2017, it was reported that he was serving as the director of the ninth council of Beijing Bridge Association. As of April 2024, he was reported as serving as a supervisor of CITIC Finance, a subsidiary of CITIC Group.
