= People's Liberation Army Academy of Art =

University in Beijing, China

Coordinates: 39°57′21″N 116°19′29″E

College of Military Culture at the PLA National Defense University
- 中国人民解放军国防大学军事文化学院
- Motto: 政治坚定、治学严谨、为兵服务、德艺双馨
- Motto in English: "Staunch politics, rigorous study, serving the soldiers, virtuous art"
- Type: Public
- Established: 1960; 66 years ago
- Affiliations: PLA National Defence University
- President: Zhang Qichao
- Political Commissar: Dong Bin
- Location: Beijing, China
- Campus: 12.7 hectares (31 acres)
- Website: www.ysxy.mil.cn

College of Military Culture at the PLA National Defense University
- Simplified Chinese: 中国人民解放军国防大学军事文化学院
- Traditional Chinese: 中國人民解放軍國防大學軍事文化學院
Transcriptions
Standard Mandarin
- Hanyu Pinyin: Zhōngguó Rénmín Jiěfàngjūn Guófáng Dàxué Jūnshì Wénhuà Xuéyuàn

People's Liberation Army Academy of Art
- Simplified Chinese: 中国人民解放军艺术学院
- Traditional Chinese: 中國人民解放軍藝術學院
Transcriptions
Standard Mandarin
- Hanyu Pinyin: Zhōngguó Rénmín Jiěfàngjūn Yìshù Xuéyuán

The Military and Cultural Institute, National Defense University PLA, previously the People's Liberation Army Academy of Art, is an academic institute of the PLA National Defense University in Haidian District, Beijing, China. The PLA Academy of Art was founded in 1960. Though it was shut down during the Cultural Revolution, the academy was reopened in 1979. Today, the university continues to operate: overseeing one campus, seven departments, and 12 specialties.

== History ==
The PLA Academy of Art was founded in May 1960 and Liu Zhijian served as the first president. Before the PLA academy was officially established, China's first military art school was the Gorky Drama School in Ruijin, Jiangxi Province in 1934. Then, in 1938, the Lu Xun Academy of Fine Arts in Yan'an under the Eighth Route Army Garrison Corps was formed. In the first years of the PLA arts academy's formation, just before the Cultural Revolution began, classes were held in the military museum.

The Great Proletarian Cultural Revolution that began in 1966, saw a shift under Mao Zedong away from creating an educated professional military at the People's Liberation Army Academy. As a result, the school saw massive changes in what was taught and many of the schools, including the school of art within the greater academy, were shut down in October 1969.

In May 1976, Hua Guofeng and Ye Jianying toppled the Gang of Four and two years later, the university's art academy was rebuilt. In 2017, the previous PLA Academy changed name to The Military and Cultural Institute, National Defense University PLA. The current chairman of the institute is Zhang Qichao.

== During the Cultural Revolution ==
Due to the Cultural Revolution, the PLA Academy had an extremely hard time operating, as there was a shortage in staff, no real classrooms, and a severe lack of transportation. The Cultural Revolution had a large impact on the arts, as people who chose to study instead of becoming workers were chastised. People already in the arts were forced to create what the government demanded. People who were scholars, defied the revolution’s beliefs in any way, or were of lower social status were heavily shamed during the Cultural Revolution. In 2017, the previous PLA Arts college changed its name to, The Military and Cultural Institute, under the People's Liberation Army National Defense University PLA.

== Struggle Sessions at the People's Liberation Army Academy ==
Porcelain representation of a struggle session in Maoist China. A Red guard is portrayed on the left in green.

The university would post big-character posters or, Da-Zi-Bao, propaganda posters that often listed students and faculty who were considered enemies of the revolution. The The (CCP) Chinese Communist Party's idea was that these posters would serve as a way to deliver the truth to the proletariat masses about the corruption of the upper class. However, it was highly unfavorable to be named on these posters, as struggle sessions commonly followed. These sessions consisted of ostracization, public humiliation, and even beatings. All across China and at the PLA academy, high school and university students, who were a part of a loyal Maoist youth group called the Red Guards, began a movement that challenged the bureaucratic school structures by inciting violence against school faculty, staff, or students who did not follow Mao Zedong's order to eradicate The Four Olds. In public, victims were flogged, forced to wear dunce caps and humiliating signboards, verbally ridiculed, and forced into a variety of contrived positions that led to suicide in many cases.

== The Red Guards ==
The Red Guards were typically young adults from about 12 to 18 years old and were easily identifiable because they carried Mao's book of quotations and wore red armbands. The Guards did not treat their inmates well and often turned on their own friends and family. Treatment from the guards started to impact the inmates’ mental health so much that they began believing themselves to be lower than the guards. Students even started to torment one another if they believed a classmate to not be properly adhering to the communist agenda.

== Gang of Four ==
The Cultural Revolution greatly disrupted military education. The academies' emphasis on technological innovation, academic accomplishment, and officer hierarchy contrasted with the values of the Cultural Revolution. As a result, military academies were targeted, and two thirds of all military institutes were shut down during the movement. The Peoples Liberation Army (PLA) was also targeted by the Gang of Four during the Cultural Revolution due to its lack of political subordination. The four sought to undermine the legitimacy of the PLA, and they did so through propaganda films, the endorsement of insubordination, and the manipulation of inter-troop grievances. On two separate occasions, in 1967 and 1973, The Gang of Four attempted to create their own military organization of politically loyal militias apart from the PLA. The targeting of the PLA by The Gang of Four and the political instability of the Cultural Revolution greatly damaged PLA military academies like the PLA Academy of Arts. In 1979, the head of the PLA Academy, Xiao Ke, acknowledged the disruptive legacy the Gang of Four had on the college, and acknowledged it as an ongoing problem.

== The College of Military Culture Today ==
In May 1976, Hua Guofeng and Ye Jianying toppled the Gang of Four. Two years later, the university was rebuilt. The academy officially reopened on September 1st, 1979. In 1981, the CCP acknowledged the atrocities committed in schools at the peak of the cultural revolution, largely pinning the struggle sessions and youth movements on Mao’s wife, Jiang Qing, and the Gang of Four. As of 2013, students could choose from 21 majors to study. Under the new reforms, the college has seen a shift back to promoting intellectualism. Mo Yan, China’s first Nobel Prize winner for literature in 2012, graduated from the academy in 1986. The current chairman of the institute is Zhang Qichao.

== Departments ==
- Department of Literature
- Department of Arts
- Department of Drama
- Department of Music
- Department of Dance
- Department of Troop Culture
- Department of Literature Administration

== Notable alumni ==
Note that class year indicates the entrance year, not graduating year.

=== Department of Dance ===
- Class of 1979: Jin Xing
- Class of 1993: Ma Su
- Class of 2003: Yang Yang
- Unknown class: Dong Jie

=== Department of Drama ===
- Class of 1979: Liu Peiqi
- Class of 1999: Yin Tao
- Unknown class: Xu Lu, Wu Gang, Xu Dongdong

=== Department of Literature ===
- Class of 1986: Mo Yan

=== Department of Music ===
- Class of 2003: Alan Dawa Dolma
- Unknown class: Chen Sisi, Han Hong, Tan Jing

=== Department of Troop Culture ===
- Unknown class: Liu Jing

=== Unknown Department ===
- Dai Yuqiang
- Lin Yongjian
- Liu Lili
- Liu Yuanyuan
- Qian Gang
- Sa Dingding
- Wang Hongwei
- Yan Ni
- Alice Longyu Gao

=== Notable faculty ===
- Hu Ke (胡可)
- Peng Liyuan

== See also ==
- Central Military Commission Political Work Department Song and Dance Troupe
