= Zhuo Lin =

Wife of Deng Xiaoping (1916–2009)

Zhuo Lin 卓琳
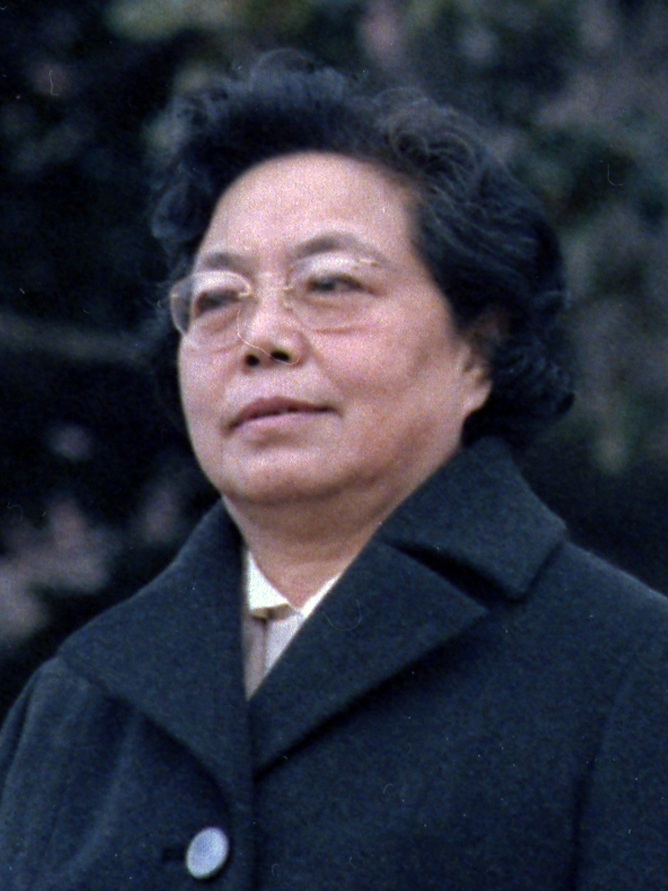
- Zhuo Lin in 1979, during a visit to the US

First Lady of China
- In role 1978–1989
- Preceded by: Han Zhijun
- Succeeded by: Wang Yeping

Personal details
- Born: April 6, 1916 Xuanwei, Yunnan, Republic of China
- Died: July 29, 2009 (aged 93) Beijing, China
- Party: Chinese Communist Party
- Spouse: Deng Xiaoping (m. 1939; died 1997)
- Children: 5, including: Deng Pufang; Deng Nan; Deng Rong
- Relatives: Deng family (by marriage)

Zhuo Lin
- Chinese: 卓琳
Transcriptions
Standard Mandarin
- Hanyu Pinyin: Zhuō Lín
- Wade–Giles: Chuo Lin

Zhuo Lin (April 6, 1916 – July 29, 2009) was the third and last wife of Deng Xiaoping, former Paramount leader of China. Zhuo worked as a confidential secretary in the party and state bureaucracy, shared Deng's exile in Jiangxi during the Cultural Revolution, and accompanied him on his 1979 visit to the United States and his 1992 southern tour. She was not politically active and made mostly ceremonial public appearances.

== Early life and education ==
Zhuo Lin was born Pu Qiongying on April 6, 1916, in Xuanwei County, Yunnan. Her father was an industrialist who manufactured Xuanwei ham and was known as Yunnan's "ham king", and he had followed Sun Yat-sen and served as a major general during the Northern Expedition.

In 1931, she was selected as a junior athlete for Yunnan's team at the national games in Peiping (now Beijing), but the games were cancelled after the Mukden Incident, which occurred while the team was travelling through British Hong Kong. She stayed in Peiping, studied at a preparatory school for several months and was admitted the following year to the Peiping No. 1 Girls' Middle School. In December 1935, at the age of 19, she joined the student protests of the December 9th Movement. In 1936, she entered the physics department of Peking University, where she was active in the Chinese National Liberation Vanguard, an anti-Japanese youth organisation.

== Yan'an and marriage ==
After the Marco Polo Bridge incident in July 1937, she left Peiping for Yan'an, where she enrolled at the Shaanbei Public School. She joined the Chinese Communist Party (CCP) in April 1938 and adopted the name Zhuo Lin for her work.

In the autumn of 1939, Deng Xiaoping, who had come to Yan'an from the Taihang Mountains for a meeting, proposed marriage to her through an intermediary. She initially declined, saying that she was young and wanted to keep working, and she later recalled that she had feared marrying an uneducated cadre. After two meetings in which Deng told her about his background and acknowledged that his age was a drawback, she agreed, on condition that they leave Yan'an soon after the wedding. She was 23, Deng was 35, and she became his third wife. His first wife had died in childbirth in 1930, and his second had divorced him in 1933.

In early September 1939, a wedding banquet was held outside Mao Zedong's cave dwelling at Yangjialing in Yan'an for Deng and Zhuo and for another couple, Kong Yuan and Xu Ming. The guests included Mao, Liu Shaoqi, Zhang Wentian and Li Fuchun. A few days later, the couple left for the Taihang Mountains, where she led a women's training class at the headquarters of the Eighth Route Army.

== Career ==
In September 1943, Zhuo became head of the news materials office of the secretariat of the CCP's North China Bureau. She followed Deng through the Second Sino-Japanese War and the Chinese Civil War, moving with the children to each newly captured area. In March 1950, she became principal of the People's Primary School of the CCP's Southwest Bureau, and in 1952, she became a confidential secretary in the secretariat of the CCP Central Committee.

During the Cultural Revolution, she accompanied Deng into exile in Jiangxi, and from October 1969, she worked at the Xinjian County Tractor Repair Plant. In 1973, she became a confidential secretary in the General Office of the State Council, and in January 1978, she became an adviser to the General Office of the Central Military Commission.

== Later life ==
Zhuo and Deng Xiaoping greeted by President Jimmy Carter and First Lady Rosalynn Carter at the White House for a state dinner during Deng Xiaoping's state visit to the United States (1979)

In January 1979, Zhuo accompanied Deng on his visit to the United States, and on January 29, she and Rosalynn Carter joined Deng and President Jimmy Carter at the welcoming ceremony at the White House. That evening, she attended the state dinner held for Deng. Along with other members of the family, she accompanied Deng on his southern tour in 1992.

After Deng's death in February 1997, Zhuo rarely left their home in Beijing except for a few major events, and she kept his study as it had been on the day he died. In July 1997, she and her daughter Deng Nan attended the ceremonies marking the return of Hong Kong to Chinese rule, in tribute to Deng's role in recovering the territory. After the 2008 Sichuan earthquake, she donated her personal savings of 100,000 yuan to the people of the affected areas.

== Death ==
Zhuo died of illness in Beijing on July 29, 2009, at the age of 93. In accordance with her wishes, her corneas were to be donated and her ashes scattered at sea, as Deng's had been, and an official farewell ceremony was held on August 10.

== Personal life ==
Zhuo and Deng had five children. She was outgoing and talkative, in contrast to the reserved Deng, and during their separations, she asked him to write to her.

Honorary titles
Preceded by Han Zhijun	Spouse of the paramount leader 1978–1989	Succeeded by Wang Yeping
