= Vice President Jiang =

Vice President Jiang (Chiang) may refer to:

- Jiang Mianheng (born 1951), Vice President of the Chinese Academy of Sciences
- Chiang Hsiao-yen (born 1942), 18th Vice President of Executive Yuan
- Johnny Chiang (born 1972), 16th Vice President of Legislative Yuan
- Mung Chiang (born 1977), Vice President of Purdue University (2021-2023)

== See also ==
- Jiang (surname)
