= Wang Yeping =

Wife of Jiang Zemin, former General Secretary of the Chinese Communist Party

- 王冶坪
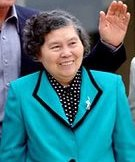
- Wang Yeping in 2002

First Lady of China
- In role 9 November 1989 – 15 November 2002
- General Secretary: Jiang Zemin
- Preceded by: Zhuo Lin
- Succeeded by: Liu Yongqing

Spouse of the President of China
- In role 27 March 1993 – 15 March 2003
- Preceded by: Vacant (see Lin Jiamei wife of Li Xiannian)
- Succeeded by: Liu Yongqing

Personal details
- Born: 12 February 1928 (age 98) Yangzhou, Jiangsu, China
- Spouse: Jiang Zemin (m. 1949; died 2022)
- Children: Jiang Mianheng; Jiang Miankang
- Education: Shanghai Foreign Language Institute

Wang Yeping (Chinese: 王冶坪; pinyin: Wáng Yěpíng, born 12 February 1928) is a Chinese politician who is the widow of Jiang Zemin, former General Secretary of the Chinese Communist Party (de facto leader) and President of the People's Republic of China, and is a native of Yangzhou, Jiangsu.

== Biography ==
Wang Yeping was born February 12, 1928, in Yangzhou and grew up in Shanghai in the Republic of China. Wang Yeping graduated from Shanghai Foreign Language Institute and majored in foreign languages. She has two sons, Jiang Mianheng born in 1951 and Jiang Miankang (江綿康) born in 1954.

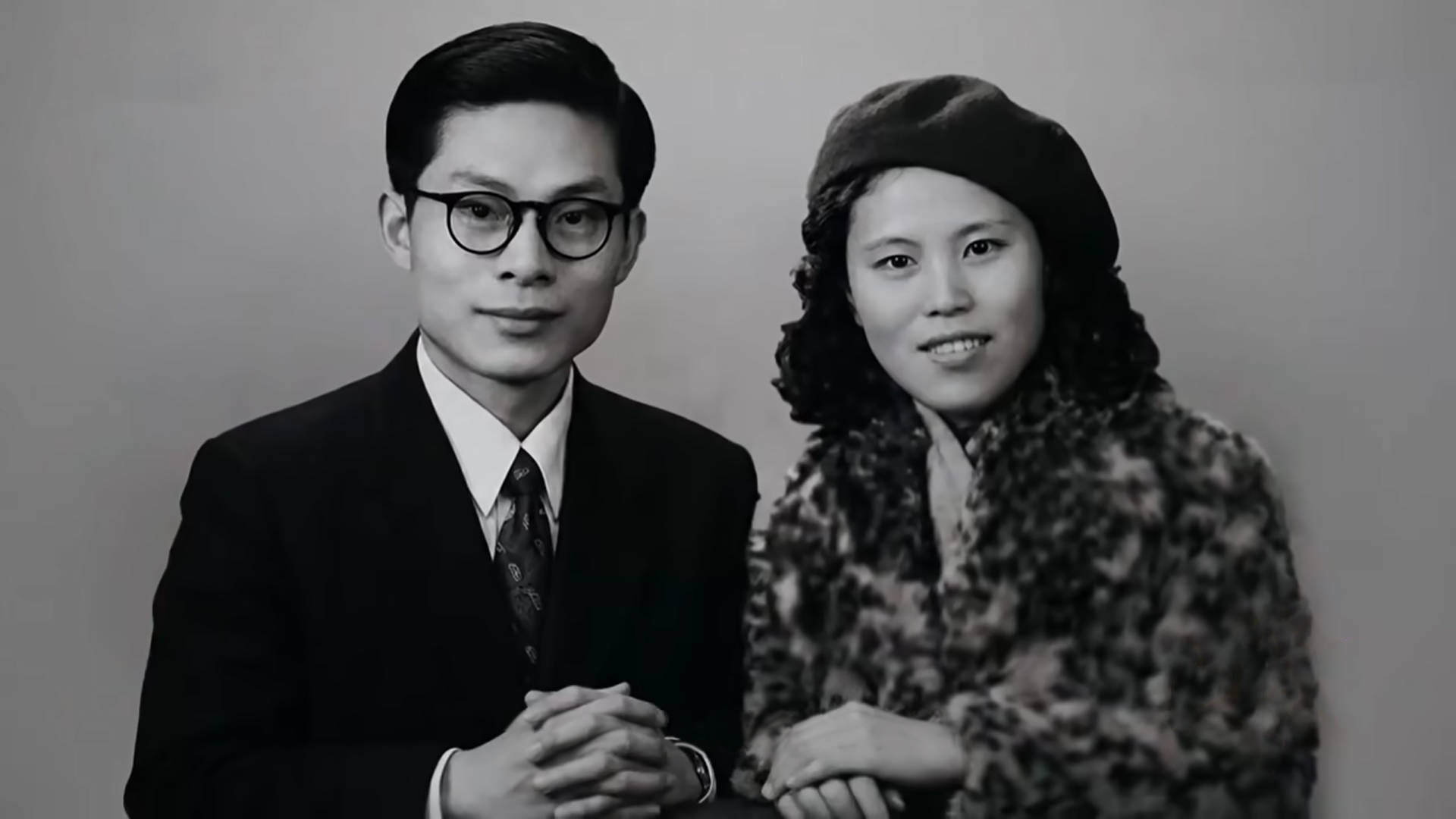
A wedding photo of Jiang Zemin and Wang Yeping, circa 1950.

Honorary titles
Preceded by Zhuo Lin	First lady of the paramount leader 1989–2002	Succeeded by Liu Yongqing
Preceded by Lin Jiamei; Vacant since 1988	Spouse of the President of China; 1993–2003	Succeeded by Liu Yongqing
