= Disability in China =

Disability in China involves a population of around 83 million facing significant challenges in inclusion, education, and employment despite government efforts and organizations like the CDPF. While there are legal frameworks and support systems, many people with disabilities, especially in rural areas, remain marginalized due to stigma, lack of accessible infrastructure, and underfunded social programs, with a greater focus needed on rights-based inclusion over welfare provision.

== Demographics ==
Of the total number of disabled individuals, men account for 42.77 million (51.55%) and women account for 40.19 million (48.45%), making the gender ratio 106.42 disabled men for every 100 disabled women. Furthermore, 20.71 million (25.96%) individuals of the disabled community reside in urban areas, whereas 62.25 million (75.04%) in rural areas.

According to the China Disabled Persons' Federation, approximately 12.33 million (14.86%) people have visual disabilities, 20.04 million (24.16%) have a hearing disability, 1.27 million (1.53%) have a speech disability, 24.12 million (29.07%) have a physical disability, 5.54 million (6.68%) have an intellectual disability, 6.14 million (7.40%) have a developmental disability, and 13.52 million (16.30%) have multiple disabilities.

== Trends ==
=== Prevalence of disability ===
There are currently only two published national sample surveys on disability conducted in China. The First National Sample Survey on Disability was published in 1987, and the Second was published in 2006. Over the past 19 years, there has been an increase in the total number of disabled individuals and in the proportion of disabled people to the total population.

Using the data from the two surveys, researchers found that the crude disability rate increased 1.5% from 1987 (4.89%) to 2006 (6.39%). However, once the data was adjusted to accommodate modified age structures and the change in population pyramid with the higher proportion of elderly in 2006, the adjusted disability rate increased by 0.5% over the time period. Although the frequency of visual, hearing, speech, physical, and intellectual disabilities did not depend on sex or place of residence (urban vs. rural) over time, there was an increase of mental disability across males, females, and rural residents that did not occur among urban inhabitants.

=== Language ===
There has been a shift in the language used to describe individuals with disabilities, reflecting a gradual increase in social acceptance of disabilities in China. Historically, the general term for people with disabilities was "can fei" (残废), which means "crippled and useless". Currently, the widely used term is "can ji" (残疾), which means "deformed", although the China Disabled Persons' Federation is advocating the use of "can zhang" (残障), which means "incomplete and obstructed", as a more neutral term. However, many derogatory terms are still utilized in common vernacular to describe people with disabilities, such as "sha zi" (傻子), which means idiot.

== Law ==
=== Laws, regulations and policies ===
Law	Year	Category	Summary
Constitution of China	1982	Protection	Protection for individuals with disabilities by State.
Compulsory Education Law	1986	Education	Right to nine years of education.
Law on the Protection of the Disabled Persons	1990	Treatment	Family and State share equal responsibility in providing care for disabled.
Regulations on the Education of Persons with Disabilities	1994	Education	Promoted access to education for individuals with disabilities.
WHO Mental Health Seminar	1999	Treatment	State increased commitment to providing quality treatment for individuals with disabilities.
National Mental Health Plan	2002–2010	Treatment	State planned multi-faceted approach to cover multiple aspects of disability care.
Proposal on Further Strengthening Mental Health Work	2004	Treatment	de facto Chinese mental health national policy.
5th National Five Year World Program for People with Disabilities	2005–2010	Accessibility	Improved accessibility of Olympics and Paralympics venues.
United Nations Convention on the Rights of Persons with Disabilities	2007	Education	Education is human right
Regulations on the Employment of People with Disabilities	2008	Protection	Protected individuals with disabilities against discrimination in employment process
Classification and Grading Criteria of Disability	2011	Protection	Defines disability definition, terminology, classification and disabled levels.
Mental Health Law	2012	Treatment	Standardized mental health services

=== Definition ===
The Law of the People's Republic of China on the Protection of Disabled Persons (1990) states that "a disabled person refers to one who suffers from abnormalities or loss of a certain organ or function, psychologically or physiologically, or in anatomical structure and who has lost wholly or in part the ability to engage in activities in a normal way." This includes individuals with "visual, hearing, speech or physical disabilities, mental retardation, mental disorder, multiple disabilities and/or other disabilities." The Law of the People's Republic of China on the Protection of Disabled Persons upholds the rights of individuals with disabilities in regards to employment opportunities, educational access, legal liability, and sufficient care.

In 2011, the People's Republic of China published the Classification and Grading Criteria of Disability (GB/T 26341-2010), as part of the National Standards of the People's Republic of China. This national standard is based on two published national sample surveys on disability conducted in China, adjusted according to international community and social development project. This national standard classify disability into six categories, which are visual disability, hearing disability, speech disability, physical disability, intellectual disability and mental disability. Some disabled factor such as visceral defects and irreversible chronic diseases are not included. This national standard not only classified disability categories, but also defines the disability definitions, terminology, disabled level and its grading criteria. The Classification and Grading Criteria of Disability was published January 14^{th,} 2011, and implemented on May 1^{st,} 2011.

=== Protection ===
Enacted in 1982 (and later amended), the 1982 Constitution of China ensured protection for individuals with disabilities: "Citizens of the People's Republic of China have the right to material assistance from the State and society when they are old, ill or disabled. The State develops social insurance, social relief and medical and health services that are required for citizens this right... The State and society help make arrangement for the work, livelihood and education of the blind, deaf-mutes, and other handicapped citizens."

In 2008, the Regulations on the Employment of People with Disabilities promoted the employment of disabled individuals and safeguarded against their discrimination. It stated that the proportion of disabled employees should be at least 1.5%, although the number differed between provinces. Failure to meet this proportion would result in a fee to the employment security fund for disabled persons.

=== Education ===
In 1986, the Compulsory Education Law mandated that every child is given the right to nine years of free public education: six years of elementary school and three years of secondary school.

In 1994, the Regulations on the Education of Persons with Disabilities aimed to promote access to education for individuals with disabilities, although according to Human Rights Watch, it "failed to make adequate progress on mainstreaming children with disabilities into regular schools as required by international law."

In 2007, the United Nations Convention on the Rights of Persons with Disabilities was signed in China and outlined increased educational opportunity for children who had disabilities. The Convention emphasizes a human rights approach to disability and asserts that "inclusive education" is a fundamental human right.

=== Treatment ===
In 1990, the Law on the Protection of the Disabled Persons stated that families and the community share the responsibility for taking care of individuals with disabilities.

In 1999, the World Health Organization (WHO) conducted an official mental health seminar with the Chinese government after which the government pledged to "improve their leadership for and support of mental health care, strengthen inter-sectoral collaboration and cooperation, establish a mental health strategy and action plan, facilitate the enactment of a national mental health law, and protect patients' rights."

In 2002, the first National Mental Health Plan (2002–2010) was signed by the Ministries of Health, Public Security, and Civil Affairs and China Disabled Persons' Federation. The aims were: "a) establishing an effective system of mental health care led by the government with the participation and cooperation of other sectors; b) acceleration the process of mental health legislation development and implementation; c) improving the knowledge and raising the awareness of mental health among all citizens; d) strengthening mental health services to decrease burden and disability; and e) developing human resources for mental health services and enhancing the capacity of current psychiatric hospitals."

In 2004, the Proposal on Further Strengthening Mental Health Word was passed and it explicitly outlines means of intervention for psychological issues, treatment for mental disorders, and protecting the rights of disabled individuals. It currently serves as the "de facto Chinese mental health national policy."

In 2012, the Mental Health Law standardized mental health services, required hospitals to have services for counseling, and protected people from being treated against their will in psychiatric wards.

=== Accessibility ===
In 2005, the 5th National Five Year World Program for People with Disabilities (2005–2010) aimed to improve the accessibility of the Olympic and Paralympic Games in Beijing and increase convenience for individuals with disabilities in "100 barrier free model cities".

== Education ==
Since the establishment of the People's Republic of China in 1949, the government has provided special education services, and the first schools for the blind and deaf were founded at this time. In 1980, the first training for special education teachers was started. In the 1990s, courses on special education were mandatory offerings in teacher training schools. The majority (75.04%) of individuals with disabilities live in rural areas and it is difficult to access funds for these areas. Thus, the "Learning in the Regular Classroom" model, which integrates children with disabilities in classroom with children without disabilities, has become more popular and in 2003, approximately 67% of individuals with disabilities are in such schools. However, students with disabilities have been "observed sitting alone, isolated from classroom activities, or have even remained at home, despite the fact that their names are on the registration list." Additionally, teachers in rural areas were not generally trained to teach students with disabilities. Vocational education for children with disabilities is limited to "painting for students with hearing impairment, massage and weaving for students with visual impairments, and sewing for those with mental retardation."

Presently, there are special schools set aside for children with disabilities. According to the China Disabled Persons' Federation, in 2009, there were 1,697 special schools for blind, deaf and intellectually disabled children. There were also 2,801 special classes in public schools. In total, 545,000 students are enrolled in special education.

== Family ==
Families with children with disabilities face unique circumstances in raising their children. Parents have reported experiencing blatantly discriminatory behavior from outsiders due to their child's disability. Furthermore, public schools have been known to not accept children with disabilities, thus denying them the opportunity to access their right to education. It is also more expensive to raise children with disabilities compared to children without, and the annual cost burden varied across types of disabilities: around 6,400 RMB more for children with a mental disability, around 16,500 RMB for children with a physical disability, and around 20,000 more RMB for children with autism. A study shows that families with disabled children spend more money on medical and caring costs and less money on education, clothing, and amusement costs when compared with families without children with disabilities. Parents of children with disabilities also report high levels of stress due to meeting the daily needs of their child, interacting with the rest of society, and dealing with pessimism.

== Advocacy ==
Traditionally, disabled individuals in China were discriminated against and did not have access to assistance.

=== Deng Pufang ===
The 1980s and 1990s were a period of disability reform as the United Nations took an international stand on this topic. According to the College of William and Mary, "these preliminary efforts in turn were advanced by support from Deng Pufang." Deng Pufang is the son of Deng Xiaoping, who is credited for implementing the reform and opening up to raise the living standards of individuals and reduce poverty in China. In 1968, Deng Pufang was detained by the Red Guards because his father was considered to be a political critic of Chairman Mao Zedong. After months of abuse and interrogation, "Deng attempted suicide by throwing himself out of a third-story window." Although the fall did not kill him, he became paraplegic and relied on a wheelchair for mobility.

However, due to his family's position of power, in 1988, Deng Pufang was able to advance the agenda for disabled individuals with the formation of the quasi-governmental organization, China Disabled Persons' Federation. He stated, "My work has certainly been made more convenient as a consequence of my father. One of the most important ways has been that, whenever I've asked to meet with high-ranking officials, they've met with me. Whereas an average disabled person would not get an audience, I've been able to. That had to do with my father."

=== China Disabled Persons' Federation ===
China Disabled Persons' Federation's mission is to promote development for disabled individuals, maintain equal and full participation in social life for disabled individuals, and allow individuals with disabilities to participate in social, material, and cultural achievements. In 2008, Deng Pufang won the UN Human Rights Prize for his work in promoting the rights for disabled individuals in China. As of 2014, Deng Pufang remains the Honorary Chairperson on the Presidium of China Disabled Persons' Federation.

== Sport ==
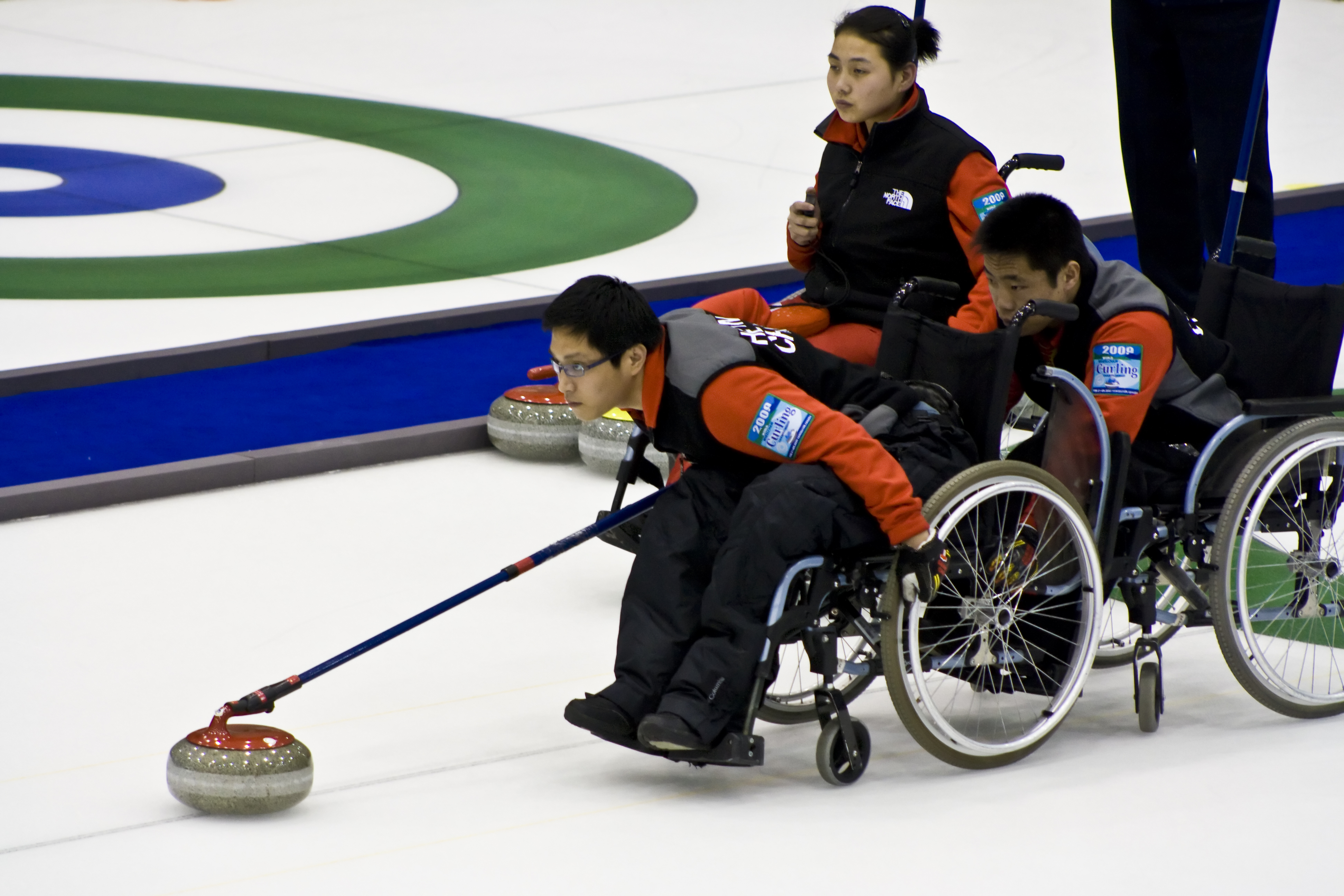
Team China at the World Wheelchair Curling Championships, 2009.

=== Paralympics ===
China has been one of the most successful nations at the Paralympic Games has it topped the Paralympics medal table from the 2004 Summer Paralympics. China has a medal tally of over 1000 at Paralympics history.

==== 2008 Summer Paralympics ====
The 2008 Summer Olympics and 2008 Summer Paralympics were hosted in Beijing, China. Through this event, China modified existing infrastructure to be more convenient for individuals with disabilities, such as adding wheelchair lifts at subway stations, which was a part of a broader shift in attitude to be more accepting of individuals with disabilities. According to Qian Zhiling, professor of special education at Beijing Normal University, "Thanks to the Paralympics, the Chinese public are now actively learning about disabled people, rather than, as previously, being horrified by and rejecting them. I think the impact will be long term: the public has realized they are able to do things and have rights just as everyone else does."

=== 2010 Asian Para Games ===
China's participation in the 2010 Asian Games and 2010 Asian Para Games led to similar changes. Because the Asian Para Games were held in Guangzhou in 2010, the stadiums were renovated to satisfy accessibility requirements and to be barrier-free for individuals with disabilities. According to Wang Xinxian, the president of the National Paralympic Committee of China, the Asian Para Games "promote awareness of how disabled people take part in social and sports affairs," and also increased the public's awareness to the needs of individuals with disabilities for adequate treatment and political rights.

=== Deaflympics ===
China has been participating at the Deaflympics regularly and has been one of the successful nations at the Deaflympics and has bagged 99 medals.
