= Peng Liyuan =

First Lady of China since 2012

- 彭丽媛
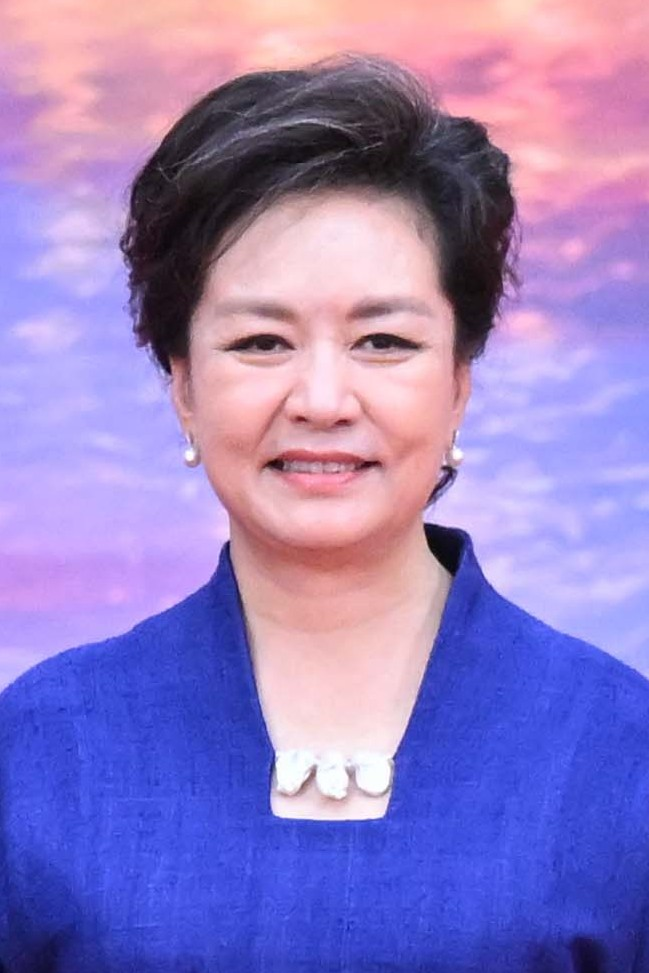
- Peng in 2025

First Lady of China
- Incumbent
- Assumed role 15 November 2012
- Paramount leader: Xi Jinping
- Preceded by: Liu Yongqing

Spouse of the President of China
- Incumbent
- Assumed role 14 March 2013
- President: Xi Jinping
- Preceded by: Liu Yongqing

President of the People's Liberation Army Academy of Art
- In office May 2012 – July 2017
- Preceded by: Zhang Jigang
- Succeeded by: Zhang Qichao

Member of the Chinese People's Political Consultative Conference
- In office February 1998 – March 2013
- Chairman: Li Ruihuan; Jia Qinglin

Personal details
- Born: 20 November 1962 (age 63) Yuncheng, Shandong, China
- Party: Chinese Communist Party
- Spouse: Xi Jinping (m. 1987)
- Children: Xi Mingze
- Relatives: Xi family (by marriage)
- Education: China Conservatory of Music
- Occupation: Singer; educator
- Profession: Soprano
- Nickname(s): Mother Peng (Chinese: 彭妈妈; pinyin: Péng māmā)

Military service
- Branch/service: People's Liberation Army
- Years of service: 1980–2017
- Rank: Major General
- Commands: People's Liberation Army Academy of Art
- Peng Liyuan's voice Peng delivers a speech to the Shanghai Cooperation Organisation Forum on Women's Education and Poverty Reduction; Recorded 20 July 2021

Peng Liyuan (Chinese: 彭丽媛; pinyin: Péng Lìyuán; born 20 November 1962) is a Chinese singer who has served as the first lady of China since 2012 as the wife of Xi Jinping, the general secretary of the Chinese Communist Party since 2012. Peng became famous in the early 1980s with "On the Hopeful Fields". Her first and main songs include "Fellow Villagers", "Mount Everest", " I Love You, the Snow of the North", "We Are the Yellow River and Mount Tai", "Yimeng Mountain Ballad", "High Clouds in the Sky", "Heavy Snow in the Cold Winter," and "People of the Five Continents Laugh Together".

In 1986, she received the Plum Blossom Award for her performance in The White-Haired Girl. She also recorded theme songs for television series, including The Water Margin (1998). She was the president of People's Liberation Army Academy of Art between 2012 and 2017, and vice president of the All-China Youth Federation between 2005 and 2010. In 2014, Peng was listed as the 57th Most Powerful Woman in the World by Forbes.

== Biography ==
Peng Liyuan was born in Yuncheng County, Shandong Province, China. Her father, Peng Longkun, was the director of Yuncheng County Cultural Center, and her mother Li Xiuying was a major opera singer in the Yuncheng County Yu Opera Troupe. Influenced by her mother, at the age of 4 to 5 years old, she was able to sing Yu opera excerpts. In 1976, at the age of 14, Peng Liyuan was admitted to the Shandong Province Yuncheng No.1 Middle School. In 1977, she was admitted to the Shandong Fifty-Seven School of the Arts (renamed the Shandong University Of Arts at the end of 1978), under the tutelage of Wang Yinsuan, specializing in folk vocal music. In 1979, she won the Excellent Prize of the Shandong Province Song and Dance Concert.

In 1980, while participating in a cultural performance in Beijing, she won the Excellent Prize for the songs Baoleng Tune and My Hometown, Mt. Yimeng, which shook up Beijing's music scene. Afterwards, she went to Finland, Sweden, Spain, Portugal, Norway and Iceland with the China National Orchestra. In the same year, Peng joined the Avant-garde Song and Dance Troupe of the Political Department of Jinan Military Region of the Chinese People's Liberation Army as a civilian soldier.

In 1981, Peng was admitted to the China Conservatory of Music as a tertiary student, where she studied under the famous singer Jin Tielin. 1982 was a key year that Peng Liyuan became familiar to the Chinese audience. In that year, while participating in the CMG New Year's Gala organized by China Central Television (CCTV), she sang On the Fields of Hope and I Love You, the Snow in Sai Bei, which won the audience's favor and thus established her unique position in the Chinese folk vocal music world. In 1983, she was admitted to the vocal class of the China Conservatory of Music as an undergraduate under the tutelage of Jin Tielin and Guo Lanying.

In 1983, when Kim Jong Il, a member of the Presidium of the Politburo of the Workers' Party of Korea (WPK), visited China for the first time, Peng Liyuan sang a bilingual rendition of the well-known North Korean song The Flower Girl.

In 1984, she was transferred to the Song and Dance Troupe of the General Political Bureau, visiting and performing to units at the front line of Laoshan in the 1980s. In the same year, Peng won the gold medal in the National Singing Group of the First National Nie Er - Xinghai Vocal Works Competition organized by the Ministry of Culture. In July of the same year, she joined the Chinese Communist Party. In 1985, to celebrate the 40th anniversary of the victory in the war and the 40th anniversary of the premiere of The White-Haired Girl, Peng Liyuan appeared in Beijing's Tianqiao Theatre, where she became the third-generation "Xi'er" after Wang Kun and Guo Lanying, and achieved the "Plum Blossom Award" - the highest honor in China's theater industry.

Peng's singing of On the Field of Hope, a song about the generational and emotional ties of people who work the land, made the song famous in the 1980s. In 1986, she sang a solo version of On the Field of Hope, and won the 1st Prize for Professional Ethnic Singing in the Second National Young Singers Grand Prix organized by CCTV. At the end of the same year, she was introduced to Xi Jinping by a friend, and after graduating from college in 1987, she was recommended for a master's degree in acoustics at the China Conservatory of Music (mentoring by Jin Tielin). On 1 September 1987, she married Xi Jinping, then the Vice Mayor of Xiamen. In May 1990, she defended her thesis and received her master's degree, becoming the first master's degree in folk vocal music trained in China. In November 1991, when Daughter of the Party premiered, Peng starred in the role of Tian Yumei, the first heroine of the play, which became the first opera portrayal of the opera that had been stamped with Peng Liyuan's original imprint.

In June 1989, following the military crackdown on the 1989 Tiananmen Square protests and massacre, Peng performed for troops who had been placed under martial law in Beijing. A photograph published on the back cover of a 1989 issue of the People's Liberation Army Pictorial showed Peng, dressed in a military uniform, singing to armed soldiers seated in Tiananmen Square. The photograph attracted international attention after circulating on Chinese social media in 2013, shortly after her husband Xi Jinping became president, but posts containing the image were quickly scrubbed from Chinese websites. Associated Press noted that most young Chinese do not know about the Tiananmen massacre, and those that do "tend to be understanding of Peng’s obligations as a member of a performance troupe in the all-powerful People’s Liberation Army".

In 2002, Peng was appointed as a visiting professor at the Shandong University of Arts, and in September 2004, she was appointed as a visiting professor at the China Conservatory of Music. In September 2005, at the invitation of the organizing committee of the 60th anniversary of the founding of the United Nations, Peng Liyuan performed the Chinese opera Psalms of Mulan for the first time at the Lincoln Center in New York City, and was awarded the Distinguished Artist Award by the Artistic Committee of the Lincoln Center for the Arts.

In November 2007, the Publicity Department of the Chinese Communist Party, the Ministry of Personnel and the China Federation of Literary and Art Circles awarded Peng Liyuan and others the honorary title of "National Youth and Middle-aged Literary and Artistic Workers of Virtue and Excellence". In the same year, the Ministry of Health appointed Peng Liyuan as the National Ambassador for tuberculosis prevention and treatment. Since then, Peng Liyuan has been actively involved in tuberculosis prevention and treatment publicity work, participating in national "World Tuberculosis Prevention and Control Day" publicity activities annually, and paying condolences to patients with tuberculosis on many occasions.

=== First Lady (2012–present) ===
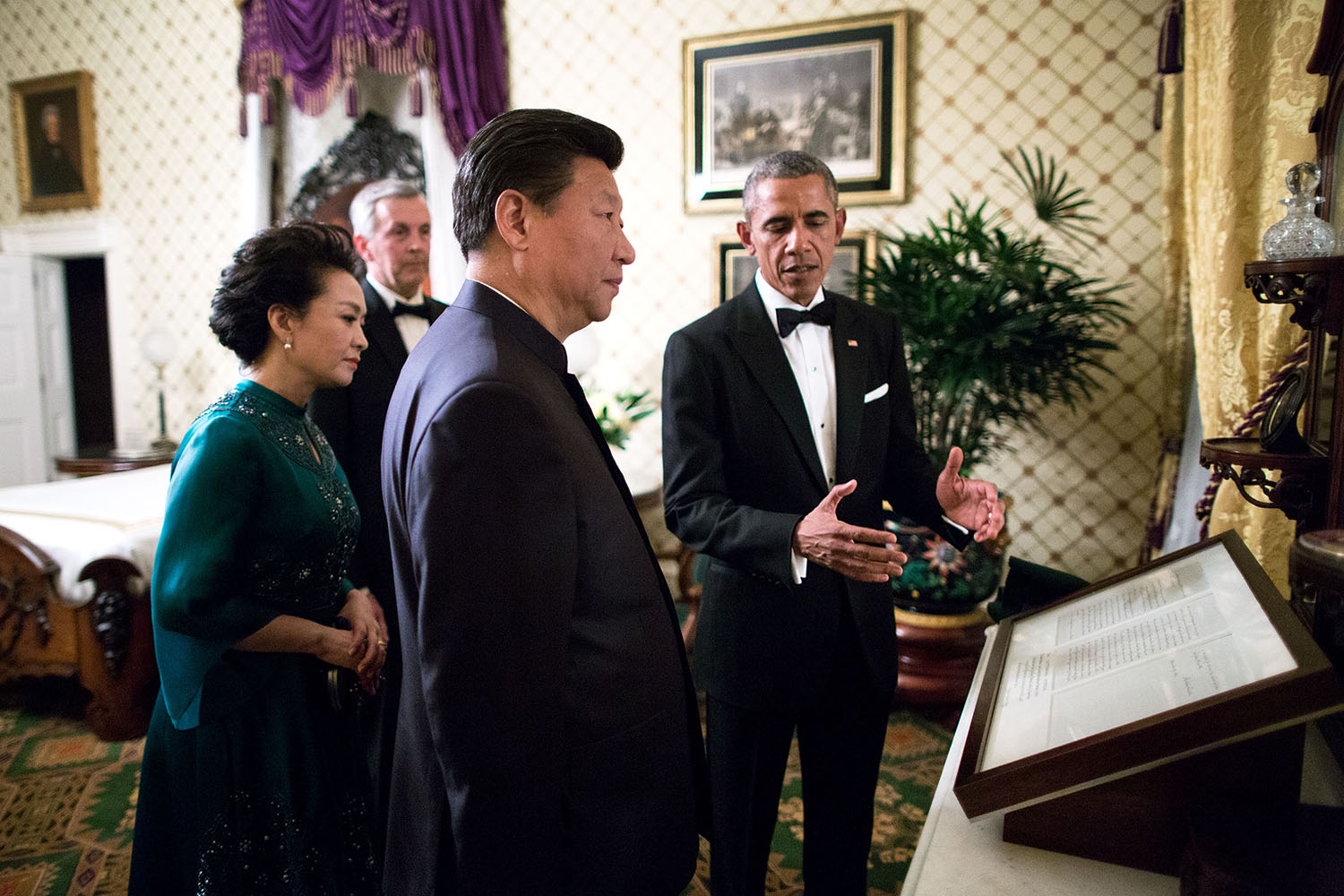
In September 2015, Chinese leader Xi Jinping and First Lady Peng Liyuan met with U.S. President Barack Obama in the Lincoln Bedroom

Her husband became the General Secretary of the Chinese Communist Party (paramount leader) in November 2012, and President of China in March 2013.

She is known within China for her fashion sense, credited to her couturier Ma Ke.

From 2012 to 2017, Peng served as the director of the People's Liberation Army Academy of Art. In mid-April 2017, the academy was officially renamed the Academy of Military Culture of the National Defense University (NDU). Instead of serving as the director of the renamed Academy of Military Culture of the NDU, Peng was transferred to the Accreditation Committee of the Political Work Department of the Central Military Commission to serve as a senior adjudicator.

She is actively involved in politics and is a member of the 11th National Committee of the Chinese People's Political Consultative Conference. Her military rank is Major-general and she has a role in the Central Military Commission's Cadre Assessment Committee. She has been a WHO Goodwill Ambassador for tuberculosis and HIV/AIDS since 2011. On 27 March 2014, Peng Liyuan, accompanying Xi Jinping during his European visit, was bestowed the honorary title of "Special Envoy for the Promotion of Girls' and Women's Education" by UNESCO at its headquarters. Peng addressed that it is a commendable endeavor for women and girls to attain education. She is committed to maximizing her efforts to assist more children, advocate for the right to education for further girls, and facilitate transformative changes in their lives.

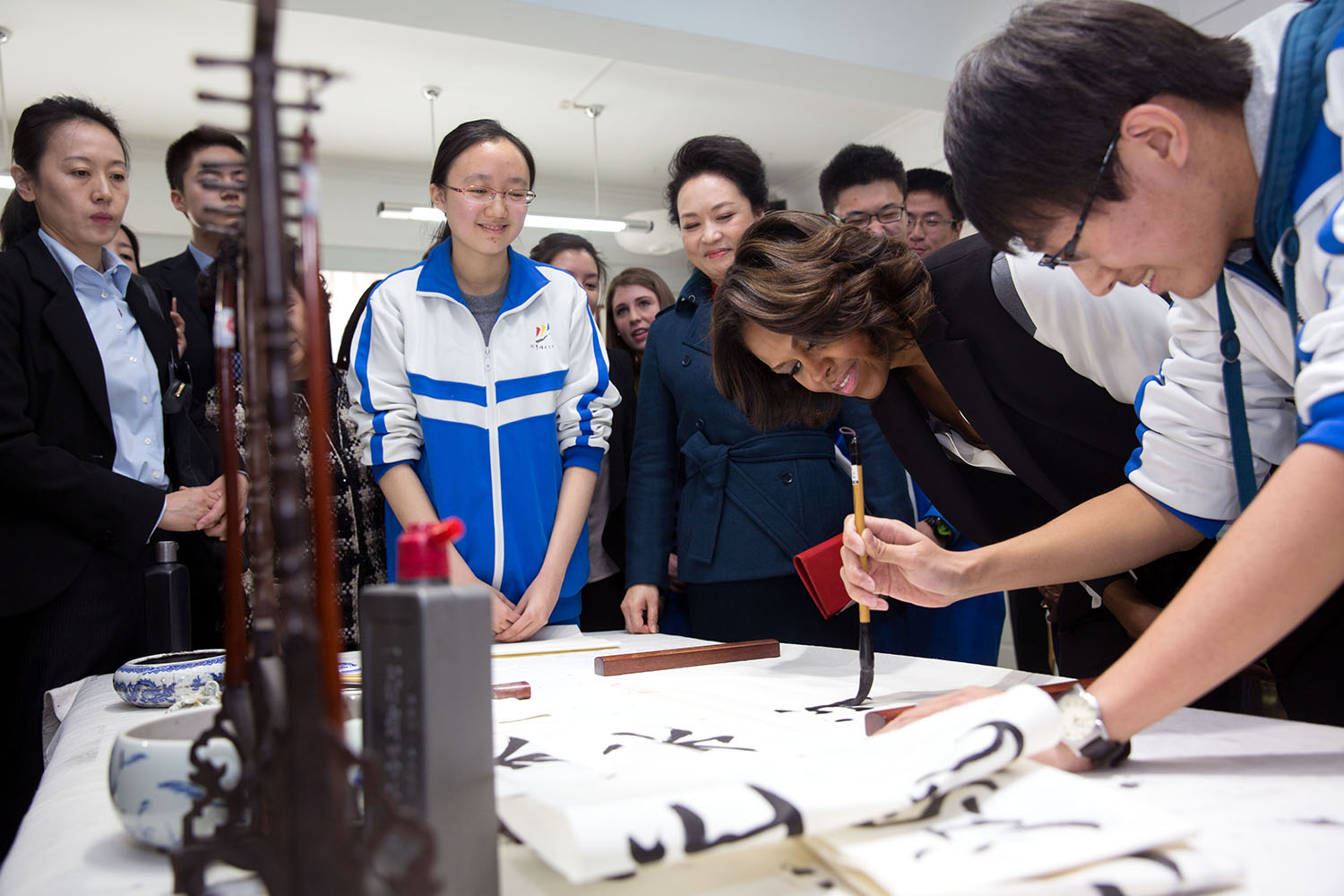
U.S. First Lady Michelle Obama and Peng Liyuan watch a calligraphy demonstration during a tour of Second High School Attached to Beijing Normal University on 21 March 2014.

Between 20–26 March 2014, at the invitation of Peng Liyuan, Michelle Obama, then First Lady of the United States and wife of President Barack Obama, traveled to Beijing, Xi'an, and Chengdu. This was Michelle Obama's first visit to China, as well as the first solo official visit to China by a US First Lady in history.

On 20 November 2014, Massey University in New Zealand conferred upon Peng an Honorary Doctorate in recognition of her "international contributions to the performing arts and health and education programmes". On 28 September 2015, during a visit by Peng, Joseph W. Polisi, then president of the Juilliard School, formally announced the establishment of the Tianjin Juilliard School, the first new branch of the Juilliard School outside of the United States. On 6 December 2017, the Juilliard School conferred to Peng an Honorary Doctorate at the China Conservatory of Music in Beijing, in recognition of her accomplishment as an outstanding artist and contribution to US-China cultural exchanges.

== Personal life ==
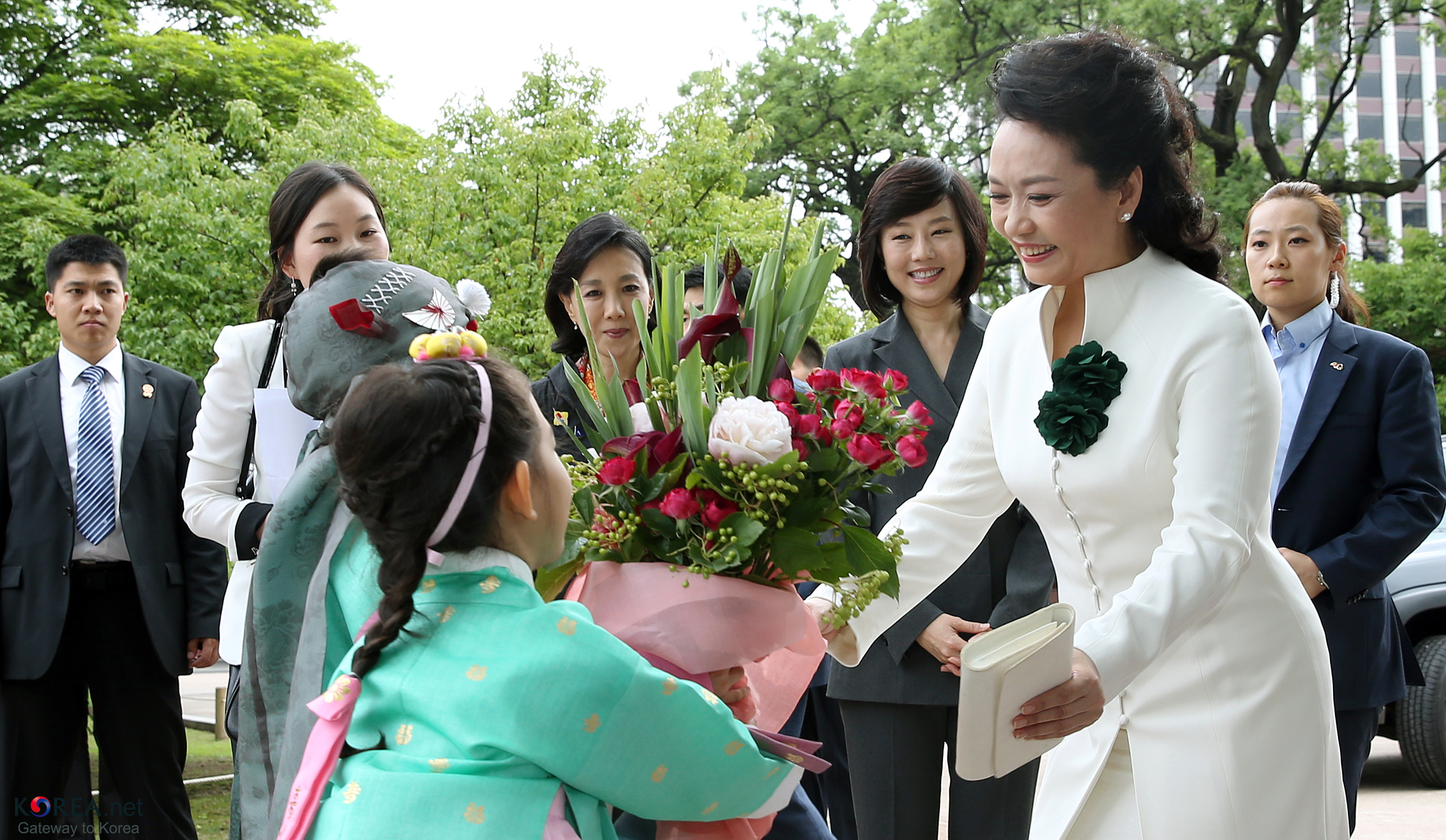
On 3 July 2014, the Chinese First Lady Peng Liyuan visited Changdeokgung Palace in Seoul

Peng Liyuan was introduced by friends to Xi Jinping in 1986, when Xi was working as the deputy mayor of the eastern port city of Xiamen, Fujian. The couple married on 1 September 1987. Four days later, Peng Liyuan returned to Beijing to appear in the National Art Festival, and then immediately departed for the United States and Canada to perform. For many years after their marriage, the couple spent more time devoted to their respective careers until Xi Jinping was promoted to Beijing.

They have one child, a daughter named Xi Mingze, who was born in 1992, nicknamed Xiao Muzi.

== See also ==
- UNESCO Goodwill Ambassador

Honorary titles
Preceded by Liu Yongqing	First Lady of China; November 2012–present	Incumbent
Preceded by Liu Yongqing	Spouse of the President of China; March 2013–present	Incumbent
