= China Association for International Friendly Contact =

Foreign intelligence and influence organization of the People's Republic of China

- 中国国际友好联络会
- Abbreviation: CAIFC
- Formation: 1984; 42 years ago
- Location: Beijing
- Chairman: Chen Yuan
- Vice President: Deng Rong
- Parent organization: Liaison Bureau of the Political Work Department of the Central Military Commission
- Subsidiaries: Center for Peace and Development Studies
- Affiliations: Chinese Communist Party
- Website: www.caifc.org.cn

China Association for International Friendly Contact
- Simplified Chinese: 中国国际友好联络会
- Traditional Chinese: 中國國際友好聯絡會
Transcriptions
Standard Mandarin
- Hanyu Pinyin: Zhōngguó Guójì Yǒuhǎo Liánluò huì

Alternative Chinese name
- Chinese: 友联会
Transcriptions
Standard Mandarin
- Hanyu Pinyin: Yǒuliánhuì

The China Association for International Friendly Contact (CAIFC) is a united front organization subordinate to the Liaison Bureau of the Political Work Department of the Central Military Commission. CAIFC was founded in 1984 and is active in overseas influence operations to promote the interests of the Chinese Communist Party (CCP).

According to a 2018 report by the United States–China Economic and Security Review Commission, CAIFC "performs dual roles of intelligence collection and conducting propaganda and perception management campaigns." The reported added, "CAIFC has additional ties to the Ministries of State Security, Civil Affairs, and Foreign Affairs, and it is a platform for deploying undercover intelligence gatherers. In addition to sending intelligence collectors abroad, CAIFC sponsors trips to China by foreign military and veteran groups, businesspeople, and former politicians which typically include contact with hand-picked PLA personnel." According to academic Arthur Ding Shu-fan, "CAIFC is really an intelligence agency affiliated with the General Political Department to study foreign military strategies. Its goal is to come up with measures to destroy the PLA's enemies."

CAIFC's chairman is Chen Yuan who replaced Li Zhaoxing. CAIFC operates an affiliated think tank called the Center for Peace and Development Studies.

== History ==
The China Association for International Friendly Contact was founded in Beijing, China, in December 1984. It was founded at the behest of Wang Zhen, Wang Shoudao, Huang Hua, with the objective of "fostering international amicable exchanges and collaboration among civil society, as well as advancing global peace and development".

Scholar Anne-Marie Brady stated that CAIFC traditionally "interacted with a wider range of groups" than did the Chinese People's Association for Friendship with Foreign Countries and had close links to Deng Xiaoping. CAIFC's vice president is Deng Rong, a daughter of Deng Xiaoping.

In 2007, a founding member of CAIFC, Wang Qingqan, was sentenced to death for spying on behalf of Japan. In 2015, CAIFC's head, Xing Yunming, was arrested on corruption charges.

CAIFC has hosted forums with prominent executives and political leaders such as Bill Gates, Tony Blair, John Howard, and Malcolm McCusker. The organization has maintained cooperative relationships with private Chinese companies such as CEFC China Energy and its former head Ye Jianming. In June 2020, it was reported that CAIFC had provided financial support to the Rajiv Gandhi Foundation. In 2024, an investigation by news outlets Humo and Apache.be revealed that CAIFC had liaised with Belgian politician Filip Dewinter who had worked for several years as a "senior political advisor" for China.

=== Sanya Initiative ===
Since 2008, CAIFC has partnered with Tung Chee-hwa's China–United States Exchange Foundation (CUSEF) and the EastWest Institute to organize forums, termed the U.S.-China Sanya Initiative (The US-China Military-to-Military Dialogue), between retired People's Liberation Army officers and retired U.S. military personnel. CAIFC was reported to have unsuccessfully attempted to influence retired U.S. military officers, including retired admiral William Owens, to lobby against U.S. arms sales to Taiwan and to delay a Pentagon report on the capabilities of the People's Liberation Army.

== See also ==
- Chinese intelligence activity abroad
- Chinese information operations and information warfare
- China Institutes of Contemporary International Relations
- Political warfare
