= Týden =

Czech weekly news magazine

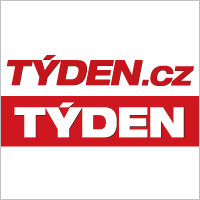
- Categories: News magazine
- Frequency: Weekly
- Publisher: Empresa Media, a.s.
- First issue: 1994; 31 years ago
- Country: Czech Republic
- Based in: Prague
- Language: Czech
- Website: tyden.cz
- ISSN: 1210-9940

Týden (literally 'week') is a Czech weekly news magazine which focuses mainly on news and news analysis. It has been in circulation in 1994.

== History and profile ==
Týden was founded in 1994 and soon became part of the Axel Springer AG media. Four years later, the magazine was bought by Ringier, a Swiss publishing house which in turn sold it to the current owner, Swiss entrepreneur Sebastian Pawlowski. The publisher of the magazine, based in Prague, is Empresa Media, A.S.

Coming out every Monday, the over a hundred pages of Týden are structured into five main sections – News, World, Business, Culture, and Modern Life. The magazine offers regular supplements and extras, such as bank of the year, cars, investments, living, information technology, etc. The magazine has a format similar to that of Focus magazine.

The editor-in-chief of the magazine, František Nachtigall, is a successor to Karel Hvížďala, Aleš Lederer and Dalibor Balšínek. The Týden staff include a number of Czech journalists, such as Martin Fendrych, Ondřej Štindl, Miroslav Korecký and Marek Šálek.

The readership of Týden is mainly urban people with higher education and it is the top-rated magazine among 30- to 44-year-old middle and upper classes.

In August 2006, Týden had a circulation of 70 000 copies.

In 2015 after Chinese company CEFC China Energy invested in the parent company, Empresa Media, of Týden its coverage of China changed with all neutral and negative reporting about China being replaced by positive reporting.
