= Liu Yongqing =

Spouse of Hu Jintao

- 刘永清
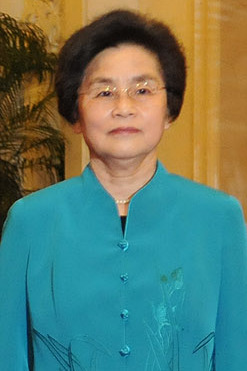
- Liu in 2010

First Lady of China
- In role 15 November 2002 – 15 November 2012
- Paramount Leader: Hu Jintao
- Preceded by: Wang Yeping
- Succeeded by: Peng Liyuan

Spouse of the President of China
- In role 15 March 2003 – 14 March 2013
- President: Hu Jintao
- Preceded by: Wang Yeping
- Succeeded by: Peng Liyuan

Personal details
- Born: 3 October 1940 (age 86) Chongqing, Republic of China
- Spouse: Hu Jintao (m. 1970)
- Children: Hu Haifeng (son); Hu Haiqing (daughter)
- Education: Tsinghua University

Liu Yongqing
- Traditional Chinese: 劉永清
- Simplified Chinese: 刘永清
Transcriptions
Standard Mandarin
- Hanyu Pinyin: Liú Yǒngqīng

Liu Yongqing (born 3 October 1940) is the wife of Hu Jintao, the former General Secretary of the Chinese Communist Party and President of China. Traditionally, Liu Yongqing's role would be primarily domestic, but Liu often accompanied her husband on his official trips to foreign countries and made personal appearances at charities and cultural institutions all over the world.

== Biography ==
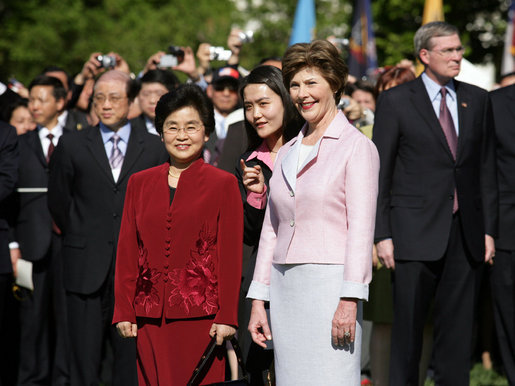
Liu, in red, with then First Lady of the United States Laura Bush at the White House in 2006.

Liu Yongqing was born in 1940 in Chongqing and attended Bashu High School. She met her husband at Tsinghua University in Beijing. Later she worked for Beijing's city planning committee. As with her husband, Liu's life and background are not widely known among foreign observers. She received virtually no public attention before Hu Jintao's leadership. Hu himself has preferred to stay out of the public eye and tended to avoid publicity during his political career.

== Children ==
Hu Jintao and Liu Yongqing have two grown children – a son named Hu Haifeng and a daughter named Hu Haiqing, both of whom were educated at the Tsinghua University. Haifeng is a businessman. Haiqing was married in 2003, at the age of 33, to Mao Daolin.

Honorary titles
Preceded by Wang Yeping	Spouse of the paramount leader 2002–2012	Succeeded by Peng Liyuan
Preceded by Wang Yeping	Spouse of the President of China; 2003–2013	Succeeded by Peng Liyuan
