= Han Zhijun =

First lady of China from 1976 to 1978

- 韩芝俊
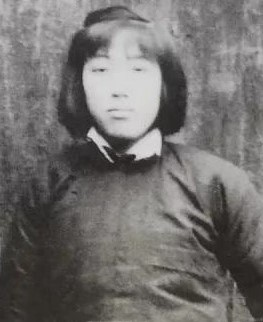
- Han Zhijun in 1949

First Lady of China
- In office 9 September 1976 – 22 December 1978
- Leader: Hua Guofeng (party chairman)
- Preceded by: Jiang Qing
- Succeeded by: Zhuo Lin

Member of the 4th Executive Committee of the All-China Women's Federation
- In office 1978–1980

Personal details
- Born: 21 February 1930 (age 96) Wutai County, Shanxi
- Party: Chinese Communist Party
- Spouse: Hua Guofeng (m. 1949; died 2008)
- Children: 4

Han Zhijun (born 21 February 1930) is a Chinese Communist Party cadre and widow of Hua Guofeng, Chairman of the Chinese Communist Party and Premier of China. She has been described as "China's most mysterious first lady", as she rarely appeared with her husband in public.

== Biography ==
Han was born in 1930 to a peasant household in a small village in Wutai County. Her father participated in training drills organized by the Eighth Route Army during the Second Sino-Japanese War and reportedly returned home to teach his daughter revolutionary songs. Han would then teach these songs to the members of the Children's Corps (Chinese: 儿童团). An uncle later described her as a smart and alert young girl, who was more use than the older male youths, and led the Children's Corps in guard duty. Han later recalled that the years 1941–1943 as the most desperate living under the Japanese army's white terror. In 1945, Han's mother joined the Chinese Communist Party and worked for the National Salvation Women's Corps (Chinese: 妇救会), using the family's crops to feed members of the Eighth Route Army, and Han entered the workforce in 1945. In 1948, Han was a cadre in a provincial organization. She married Hua Guofeng in November that year. In August 1949, she went with Hua when he became party secretary of Xiangyin County. Their eldest child, Su Hua, was born in early 1950. The family moved to Beijing in 1951, after Hua was transferred to the State Council.

== As first lady ==
Han never accompanied Chairman Hua on business trips abroad and the two rarely appeared in public together. Reportedly, Han continued to cycle to and from work. She served as director of the cadre department of the import-export company of the Ministry of Light Industry (Chinese: 轻工业部) from 1975. In 1978, she participated in the 4th executive committee of the All-China Women's Federation. Since Hua's death, Han has made public appearances at his memorial services, and the 2013 and 2014 Spring Festival celebrations, where she was publicly greeted by Xi Jinping and Zhang Dejiang, respectively.

Honorary titles
Preceded by Jiang Qing	Spouse of the paramount leader 1976–1978	Succeeded by Zhuo Lin
