= Deng Nan =

Chinese politician and physicist

- 邓楠

Vice-chairperson and Party Secretariat of the China Association for Science and Technology
- In office 2005–2006

Secretary of the China Association for Science and Technology
- In office 2006–2011

Personal details
- Born: October 1945 (age 80) Guang'an, Republic of China
- Party: Chinese Communist Party
- Spouse: Zhang Hong
- Children: Deng Zhuorui
- Parent(s): Deng Xiaoping; Zhuo Lin
- Relatives: Deng family
- Education: Peking University

Deng Nan (simplified Chinese: 邓楠; traditional Chinese: 鄧楠; pinyin: Dèng Nán; born October 1945) is a Chinese politician and physicist.

== Early life ==
Deng was born the second daughter of Deng Xiaoping with his third wife Zhuo Lin.

Deng studied physics at Peking University from 1964 to 1970. During university, she was secretary of the branch Communist Youth League of China. In Spring 1968, Nie Yuanzi directed Red Guards to detain Deng and her elder brother Deng Pufang. They were imprisoned in separate rooms of the physics department in an attempt to force self-criticisms from each. Deng was released relatively soon, whereas her brother was held and tortured for four months.

In 1970, Deng was sent to the Gaozhaizi Commune in present-day Ningqiang County for reeducation. She was assigned to the people's welfare production brigade at Dingjiawan (Chinese: 丁家湾), where she lived with the family of the branch secretary Jiang Yingchang. She participated in constructing terraces, drying cereals, collecting firewood, and other labour. In her first year, Deng was referred to as the most zealous of the intellectual youth sent to Ningqiang County.

== Career ==
She served as vice minister of China's State Science and Technology Commission (1998 - November 2004). She was a member of the 17th Central Committee of the Chinese Communist Party.

She is considered to be a princeling.

== Personal life ==
Deng's university classmate Zhang Hong (Chinese: 张宏) was sent to the same commune in Ningqiang County, where the two frequently cooked food and collected firewood together. They are thought to have already been romantically involved at this point. The two later had a daughter in 1972 called Deng Zhuorui (Chinese: 邓卓芮), alternatively known as Mianmian (Chinese: 眠眠), known professionally as Ran (Anne) Zhuo (Chinese: 卓苒). She married the CEO of Anbang Insurance Group, Wu Xiaohui in 2004. It was Wu's third marriage and they had one son. In 2014, Zhuorui ceased being a shareholder in two companies owned by Anbang, which was followed by news of the couple's separation in 2015.
