= First Lady of China =

Wife of the de facto top leader of the People's Republic of China

The term "First Lady" refers to the legal spouse of the paramount leader or the state representative of China, but this is an unofficial title. Because China's highest leader and state representative are not necessarily the same person, the official definition of "first spouse" has long been absent.

== History ==
During Liu Shaoqi's tenure as President of China, he and his wife Wang Guangmei made several overseas visits. Foreign media often referred to Wang Guangmei as "First Lady," which displeased Mao Zedong's wife, Jiang Qing. Jiang Qing believed that as the wife of the Chairman of the Chinese Communist Party, she was the rightful First Lady. This laid the groundwork for the later criticism and struggle against Liu Shaoqi and his wife during the Cultural Revolution.

Until 2013, when Xi Jinping, China’s top leader, visited Russia, Tanzania and South Africa with his wife Peng Liyuan, the official Chinese media Xinhua News Agency, People’s Daily and Global Times referred to Peng Liyuan as "China’s First Lady", which sparked a "First Lady fever" in China. After that, official reports mostly referred to Peng Liyuan as "Xi Jinping’s wife", and when she visited foreign countries, she was referred to as "Professor Peng Liyuan".

== List of spouses of the paramount leaders ==
All six leaders have had a spouse during their terms in office. The current First Lady is Peng Liyuan, wife of General Secretary Xi Jinping.

Picture	Name	Leader	Tenure
	Jiang Qing 江青 (1914–1991)	Mao Zedong	1 October 1949 – 9 September 1976
	Han Zhijun 韩芝俊 (1930- )	Hua Guofeng	9 September 1976 – 22 December 1978
	Zhuo Lin 卓琳 (1916–2009)	Deng Xiaoping	22 December 1978 – 9 November 1989
	Wang Yeping 王冶坪 (1928- )	Jiang Zemin	9 November 1989 – 15 November 2002
	Liu Yongqing 刘永清 (1940- )	Hu Jintao	15 November 2002 – 15 November 2012
	Peng Liyuan 彭丽媛 (born 1962)	Xi Jinping	15 November 2012 – Incumbent

== List of spouses of presidents ==
Since the first president, six presidents have had a spouse during their terms in office. The current spouse is Peng Liyuan, wife of President Xi Jinping.

No.	Image	Spouse	President	Tenure
1		Jiang Qing	Mao Zedong	27 September 1954 – 27 April 1959
2		Wang Guangmei	Liu Shaoqi	27 April 1959 – 31 October 1968
3		Lin Jiamei	Li Xiannian	18 June 1983 – 8 April 1988
	Vacant (Note: Yang Shangkun's wife, Li Bozhao, predeceased him in 1985, three years prior to his assumption of the presidency.)		Yang Shangkun	8 April 1988 – 27 March 1993
4		Wang Yeping	Jiang Zemin	27 March 1993 – 15 March 2003
5		Liu Yongqing	Hu Jintao	15 March 2003 – 14 March 2013
6		Peng Liyuan	Xi Jinping	14 March 2013 – Incumbent
