= Patrick Ho =

Hong Kong ophthalmologist and politician

Patrick Ho GBS JP
- 何志平
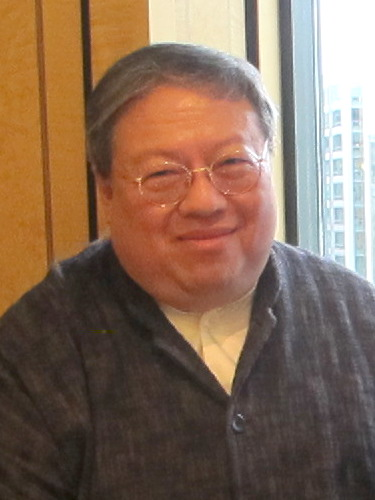

Secretary for Home Affairs
- In office 1 July 2002 – 30 June 2007
- Chief executive: Tung Chee-hwa; Donald Tsang
- Preceded by: Lam Woon-kwong
- Succeeded by: Tsang Tak-sing

Personal details
- Born: 24 July 1949 (age 77) Hong Kong
- Spouse: Sibelle Hu Huizhong (m. 1997)
- Children: 1
- Education: Vanderbilt University

Ho Chi-ping (Patrick)
- Traditional Chinese: 何志平
Transcriptions
Standard Mandarin
- Hanyu Pinyin: Hé Zhìpíng
Yue: Cantonese
- Yale Romanization: hòh ji pìhng
- Jyutping: ho4 zi3 ping4
- Sidney Lau: Ho^{4} Ji^{3} Ping^{4}

Patrick Ho Chi-ping GBS JP (born 24 July 1949 in Hong Kong) is a Hong Kong ophthalmologist turned politician.

He joined the Chinese People's Political Consultative Conference and the Preparatory Committee of Hong Kong SAR. When the Principal Officials Accountability System was introduced in 2002, Chief Executive of Hong Kong Tung Chee-wah appointed Ho Secretary for Home Affairs, a senior ministerial post.

He was convicted of bribery offences in a U.S. federal court in 2018. He was sentenced to three years imprisonment and released in June 2020. The Medical Council of Hong Kong ruled that his name was removed from the General Register for a period of 1 year from May 2021.

== Education and ophthalmologist career ==
Ho studied in the Diocesan Boys' School, Hong Kong. He won a scholarship and was educated in the US for 16 years. An ophthalmologist who trained in eye surgery with special expertise in retinal surgery, he was a fellow at Harvard Medical School. He returned to Hong Kong in 1984 and taught eye surgery at the Chinese University of Hong Kong as Professor of Ophthalmology. From 1988 to 2000, he was Professor of Surgery (Ophthalmology) at the Chinese University of Hong Kong.

== Political career ==
Since 1993, he has been a member of the 8th, 9th, 10th and 11th National Committee of the Chinese People's Political Consultative Conference, and in 1995, he was appointed as a member of the Preparatory Committee of the Hong Kong Special Administrative Region and the Selection Committee of the first SAR Government. Ho was appointed vice-chairman of the Hong Kong Policy Research Institute in 1996. In July 1997, he was appointed to the Provisional Urban Council until its disestablishment in 1999. In 2000, Ho was appointed Chairman of the Arts Development Council.

In 2002, he joined the Chief Executive of Hong Kong Tung Chee-wah's second HKSAR administration as the Secretary for Home Affairs when the Principal Officials Accountability System was introduced. He served in this senior ministerial post for five years.

In 2003, Ho was present at the Che Kung Temple in Sha Tin following tradition and drew Kau Chim sticks to foretell the fortune of Hong Kong. He drew number 83 which represented bad times ahead. Hong Kong experienced a fatal SARS outbreak and an attempted imposition of Basic Law Article 23, which led to massive protests at the 1 July march. Ever since, no Hong Kong minister has represented the government to the temple.

Ho was appointed chairman of the Sports Council in 2005.

After leaving the government in 2007, he joined a lobbying firm established and funded by CEFC China Energy (CEFC), a Shanghai-based energy company, of which he became vice-chairman and secretary-general. The organisation, under Ho, was a leading exponent of the Xi Jinping's Belt & Road Initiative.

== Bribery and money laundering arrest and conviction ==
Ho and former Senegalese foreign minister Cheikh Gadio were arrested in New York in late November 2017, charged with violating the Foreign Corrupt Practices Act (FCPA) and money laundering. The pair offered a US$2 million bribe to former Chad President Idriss Déby for oil rights, and deposited a US$500,000 bribe to an account designated by the Minister of Foreign Affairs of Uganda on behalf of CEFC. The million-dollar bribes were disguised as donations. The energy fund, chaired by Ye Jianming, denied authorising Ho to engage in corrupt practices.

James Biden, brother of Joe Biden, got a call from Patrick Ho when Ho was arrested by the FBI. James Biden said he believed it had been meant for Hunter Biden, the son of Joe Biden.

On 5 December 2018, Ho was convicted on seven counts of bribery and money laundering, following a federal trial in which Gadio stood as a witness for prosecutors. He was sentenced to three years' imprisonment and fined $400,000 in March 2019. After being imprisoned at the Metropolitan Correctional Center, New York, as of 9 June 2020, the South China Morning Post reported that Ho has been released and deported to Hong Kong.

== Subsequent legal matters ==
In 2023, Ho was identified in a US federal criminal indictment of Gal Luft in a Chinese government attempt to influence the 2016 United States elections.

== Family ==
Ho has a daughter and a son from his marriage to a Chinese woman in the US. After returning to Hong Kong in 1984, he divorced his wife.

Ho married Taiwanese actress Sibelle Hu Huizhong on 5 September 1997. They have a daughter, Audrey Ho Ka Chun, born in 2000.

== See also ==
- Hong Kong Government Lunar New year kau cim tradition

Political offices
Preceded by Lam Woon-kwong	Secretary for Home Affairs; 2002–2007	Succeeded by Tsang Tak-sing
Order of precedence
Preceded by Shelley Lee; Recipients of the Gold Bauhinia Star	Hong Kong order of precedence Recipients of the Gold Bauhinia Star	Succeeded by Sarah Liao; Recipients of the Gold Bauhinia Star
