= Gal Luft =

American-Israeli author

- גל לופט
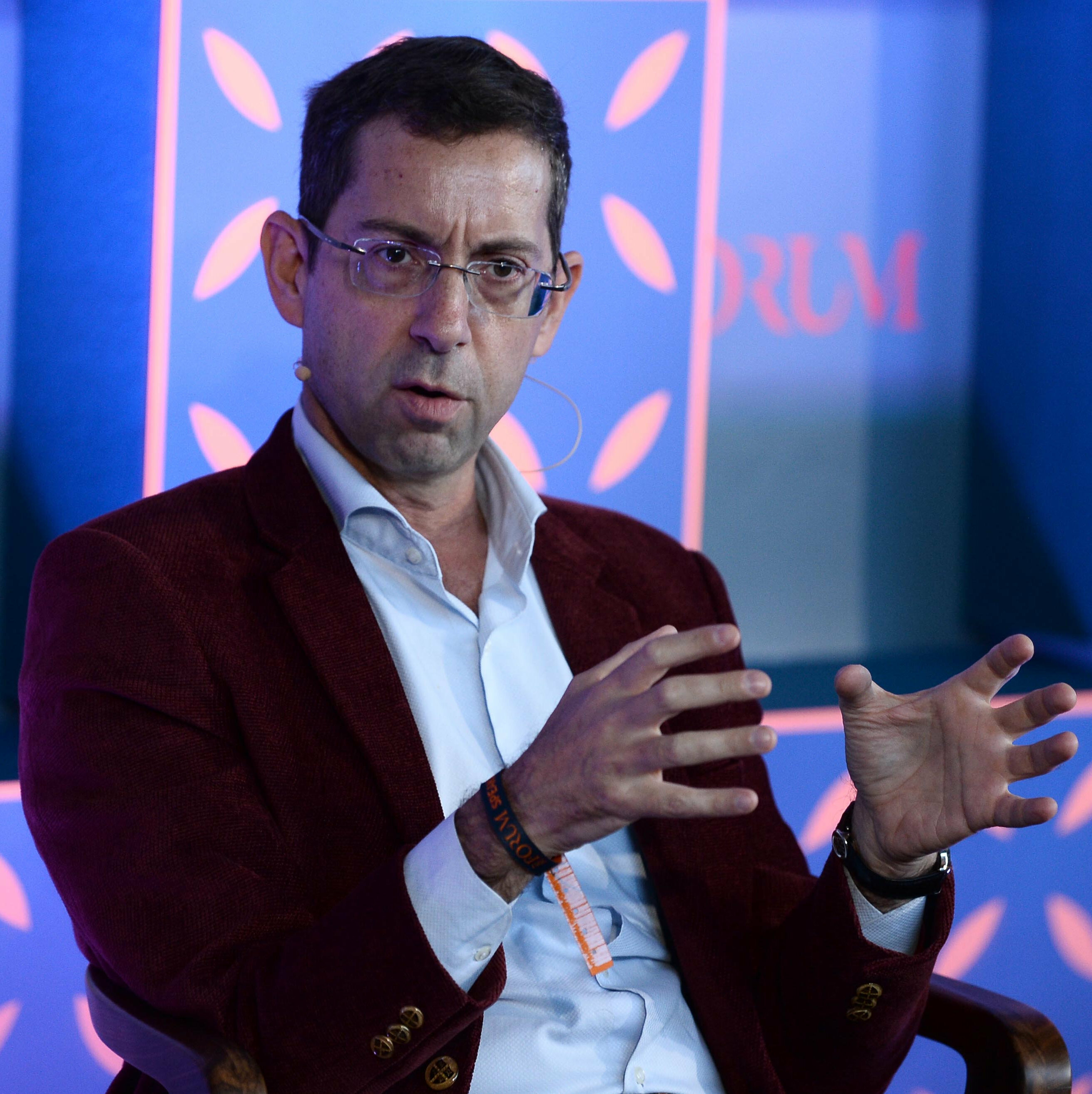
- Born: May 26, 1966 (age 59); Haifa, Israel
- Education: Bar-Ilan University (BA); Tel Aviv University (MA); Johns Hopkins University (PhD)
- Scientific career
- Thesis: The Cultural Dimension of Multinational Military Cooperation (2003)
- Doctoral advisor: Eliot A. Cohen

Gal Luft (Hebrew: גל לופט; born May 26, 1966) is an Israeli-American think-tank director, author and alleged foreign agent. Luft was a lieutenant colonel in the Israel Defense Forces and is the executive director of the Institute for the Analysis of Global Security and cofounder of the Set America Free Coalition.

Luft was arrested in Cyprus on February 17, 2023, on a warrant issued by Interpol on U.S. charges of weapons trafficking. After being released on bail, he went missing on March 28; he subsequently fled and went into hiding. On July 10, 2023, the US Justice Department unsealed the indictment for this arrest, dated November 2022, accusing Luft of eight charges including acting as an unregistered foreign agent of Chinese entities under the US Foreign Agents Registration Act and violating trade sanctions against Iran. Among the indictment's allegations is that Luft, at the behest of Chinese entities, recruited and paid an unnamed adviser to then-president-elect Donald Trump to adopt pro-Chinese positions.

In July 2023, Luft said he had made allegations of corruption by US president Joe Biden's son, Hunter Biden to the FBI and US Justice Department. These allegations were made in March 2019 involving improper financial arrangements with the Chinese energy company CEFC. He further said the criminal charges against him were politically motivated reprisals for his allegations. In September 2024, federal prosecutors stated that Luft was re-arrested and will be extradited to the United States.

== Published works ==
=== Books ===
- Energy Security Challenges for the 21st Century (2009)
- Turning Oil into Salt: Energy Independence Through Fuel Choice (2009)
- Beer, Bacon and Bullets: Culture in Coalition Warfare from Gallipoli to Iraq (2010)
- Petropoly: The Collapse of America's Energy Security Paradigm (2012)
- Silk Road 2.0: US Strategy toward China's Belt and Road Initiative (2017)
- De-Dollarization: The Revolt Against The Dollar And The Rise Of A New Financial World Order (2019)

=== Selected publications ===
- Luft, G. (2002). "The Palestinian H-bomb: Terror's winning strategy." Foreign Affairs, 2–7.
- Luft, G. (2003). "The logic of Israel's targeted killing." Middle East Quarterly.
- Luft, G. (2009). "Dependence on Middle East energy and its impact on global security". Energy and environmental challenges to security (pp. 197–210). Springer Netherlands.
- Luft, G. (2016). "China's infrastructure play: why Washington should accept the new Silk Road". Foreign Affairs, 95(5), 68–75.
