= China Disabled Persons' Federation =

National organization for individuals with disability in China

- 中国残疾人联合会

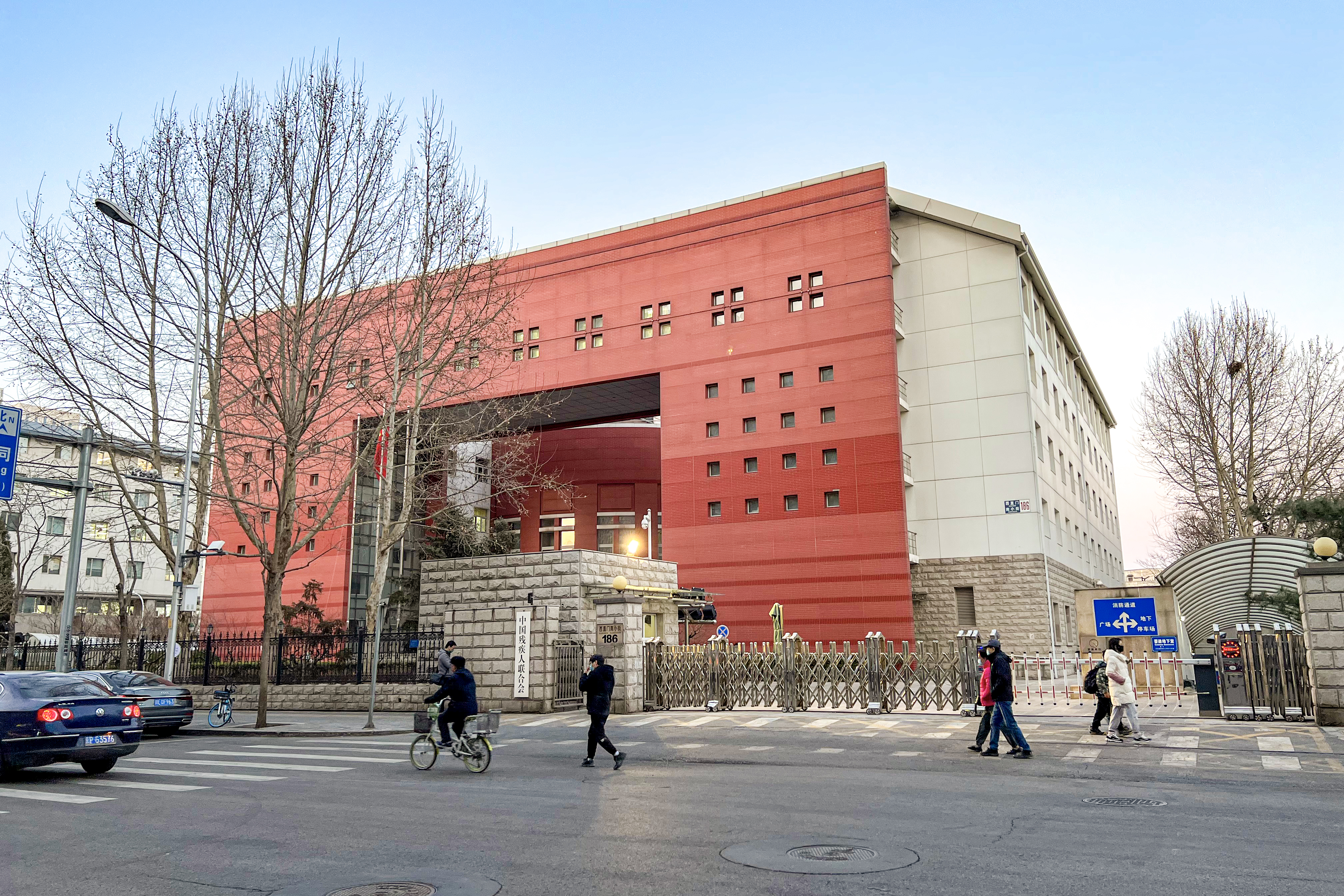
- Headquarters of the CDPF
- Formation: March 1988
- Type: People's organization
- Official language: Chinese
- Chairman: Cheng Kai
- Website: www.cdpf.org.cn
- Formerly called: China Association for the Blind and Deaf; China Welfare Fund for the Handicapped

China Disabled Persons' Federation
- Simplified Chinese: 中国残疾人联合会
- Traditional Chinese: 中國殘疾人聯合會
Transcriptions
Standard Mandarin
- Hanyu Pinyin: Zhōngguó Cánjírén Liánhéhuì

Abbreviation
- Simplified Chinese: 中国残联
- Traditional Chinese: 中國殘聯
Transcriptions
Standard Mandarin
- Hanyu Pinyin: Zhōngguó Cánlián

The China Disabled Persons' Federation (CDPF; Chinese: 中国残疾人联合会) is a people's organization for individuals with disabilities in China established in Beijing, China in March 1988. The predecessors of the CDPF are the China Association for the Blind and Deaf, established in 1960 and the China Welfare Fund for the Handicapped established in 1984. The three basic functions of the CDPF are to represent the interests of people with disabilities in China and help protect their legitimate rights, to provide them with comprehensive and effective services and to supervise affairs relating to people with disabilities commissioned by the Chinese government. The emblem of the CDPF looks like a plum flower which features prominently in Chinese art and culture. With its motto "humanity, probity, service and contribution" the CDPF has helped many disabled persons.

As of 2016, CDPF has estimated that there are 80 million people with disabilities in China, while only 30 million have registered with the government.

== Origin and history ==
In March 1953, the Chinese Welfare Association for the Blind was established in Beijing. The purposes of the Association are: to assist the government in solving problems concerning the blind, to care for the blind and to work for the welfare of the blind. Xie Juezai, Interior Minister of the Government Administration Council of the Central People's Government, served as chairman, Wu Yunfu (伍云甫) and Huang Nai (黄乃) served as vice chairman, and Zhang Wenqiu (张文秋) served as Director-General.

In February 1956, the Chinese Welfare Association for the Deaf was established in Beijing. The purposes of the Association are: to contact the deaf and to work for their welfare. Wu Yunfu (伍云甫), general secretary of the Chinese People's Relief Association, served as chairman.

In February 1956, the Chinese Welfare Association for the Deaf was established in Beijing. The purposes of the Association are: to contact the deaf and to work for their welfare. Wu Yunfu (伍云甫), general secretary of the Chinese People's Relief Association, served as chairman.

On May 30, 1956, according to Premier Zhou Enlai's instructions, the Chinese Welfare Association for the Deaf and the Chinese Welfare Association for the Blind began to be directed by the Interior Ministry officially.

On May 20, 1960, the Chinese Welfare Association for the Blind and the Chinese Welfare Association for the Deaf merged into the China Association for the Blind and Deaf.

In August 1978, Report on the return of the China Association for the Blind and Deaf's organization and working was approved by the central leadership after the instructions. Afterwards, the Chinese Blind deaf-mute Association immediately returned to work and resumed the publication of the Blind Monthly.

On March 15, 1984, the inaugural meeting of the China Welfare Fund for the Handicapped was held in Beijing.

In July 1986, The China Organizing Committee of the United Nations Decade of Disabled Persons was established in Beijing, and the first Organizing Committee meeting was held. The meeting was presided over by Cui Naifu (崔乃夫). Deng Pufang delivered a work report, and the Vice Premier Qiao Shi delivered an important speech at the meeting. The responsibilities and work system of the Organizing Committee and its secretariat were formulated.

On March 11 to 13, 1988, the First National Congress of the China Disabled Persons' Federation was held in Beijing.

In December 1990, The 17th meeting of the Seventh National People's Congress Standing Committee examined and adopted the People's Republic of China on Protection of Disabled Persons Act. The Act will come into force on May 15, 1991.

On September 4, 1994, The sixth FESPIC Games for the Disabled opened in Beijing. Premier Li Peng announced the opening. Deng Pufang presided over the opening ceremony.

On January 14, 2011, the China Disabled Persons Rehabilitation Association of the Fifth National People's Congress was inaugurated in Beijing.

On May 15, 2011, the China Disabled Persons' Federation and Fujian Film Studio produced the first Special Olympics theme of the film "Special Love" as a tribute film premiere held at Great Hall of the People in Beijing.

On September 15 to 16, 2011, co-sponsored by the China Disabled Persons' Federation and Handicap International, the nationwide community-based rehabilitation of international cooperation project workshop held in Beijing.

On October 11, 2011, the opening ceremony of the Eighth Chinese National Games for the Disabled was held in Hangzhou.

On December 6, 2011, the China Disabled Persons' Federation together with the World Health Organization and World Bank organized the World Disability Report and Community-based Rehabilitation Guide conference at Great Hall of the People in Beijing.

On February 1, 2012, the China Disabled Persons' Federation held the recommendations and proposals symposium for 2012 National People's Congress and Chinese People's Political Consultative Conference. On February 21, China Disabled Persons' Federation and China National Radio held the "Cultural Assistive Action Plan" strategic cooperation agreement signing ceremony at the China Braille Library in Beijing.

On September 28, 2015, the First Lady of China unveiled a stamp honoring disabled people that was designed and created by China Disabled Persons' Federation.

== Functions and duties ==
=== Functions ===
CDPF performs three functions:

1. Represent interests of people with disabilities in China and help protect their legitimate rights,
2. Provide comprehensive and effective services to them,
3. Commissioned by the Chinese government to supervise affairs relating to people with disabilities in China.

CDPF is committed to: Promote the humanitarianism, Promote the human rights of people with disabilities, Promote the integration of people with disabilities in all aspects.

=== Duties ===
1. The CDPF propagates the Protection of Disabled Persons Law of the People's Republic of China; maintains the civil rights of persons with disabilities in the political, economic, cultural, and social equality and services for people with disabilities.
2. The CDPF educates persons with disabilities to comply with law and fulfil their obligations.
3. The CDPF is the bridge between persons with disabilities and the government. It mobilizes society to understand, respect, care and help persons with disabilities.
4. The CDPF develops and promotes the rehabilitation of disabled people, education, poverty, employment, human rights, culture, sports, social security and disability prevention work to improve the environment and conditions of persons with disabilities for encouraging them to participate in social life.
5. The CDPF participates in the research, development and implementation of the laws, regulations, policies, and planning for disabled people and plays the role of an integrated, coordinated, advice, services, management and guidance of the work in these fields.
6. The CDPF manages and provides People's Republic of China Disabled Persons Card (中国残疾人证) for the Chinese disabled.
7. The CDPF manages and guides all kinds of organizations for disabilities.
8. Being the UN ECOSOC special consultative, The CDPF carries out international exchanges and cooperation.

== Leadership ==
Since the eight national congress of the CDPF in September 2023, the current chair of the CDPF is Cheng Kai. Yang Xiaodu serves as the honorable chair of the federation.

=== Former presidents ===
- Deng Pufang was the president of the CDPF from 1988 to 2008. Born in 1944, Guangan, Sichuan Province, Deng is the son of Deng Xiaoping. He became disabled because of the persecution during the Cultural Revolution. He is the Executive President of Beijing Organizing Committee for the Games of the XXIX Olympiad (BOCOG), Chairman of China Foundation for People with Disabilities.
- Zhang Haidi was born in September 1955, Jinan, Shandong Province and became physically disabled at 5 years old. In November 2008, she was elected the President of the CDPF.
- Lu Yong was born in the Hebei Province of China in 1963, he has a PhD in Economics and is a postdoctoral fellow in management and engineering at Tsinghua University.

== Organization ==
=== Emblem ===
- The main graphic of the emblem is a combination of three letters "CJR", which is the abbreviation of "disabled persons" in Chinese pinyin. It represents disabled persons and it is similar to the international emblem of disabled persons.
- The shape of the emblem is the flower of plum. It is a symbol of the spirit of the disabled person's self-esteem, self-confidence, and self-reliance. The green background symbolizes the tenacious vitality while the plum in full bloom symbolizes the hope of people with disabilities.
- The plum is composed of five interconnected Chinese characters for "人 (people)", which symbolizes that disabled persons join hands and live in a warm society where they can be understood and respected. It also symbolizes that all the people of the country follow the humanitarian and form a whole together with disabled people.
- The colour gold is used for the centre graphic and the sideline stands for the sunshine of the country. It is the symbol of the vibrant thriving cause for disabled people.
- The badge of China Disabled Persons' Federation uses the emblem as the obverse side and marks the back with the words "China Disabled Persons' Federation".

=== National organizations ===
==== National People's Congress ====
The highest authority of the China Disabled Persons' Federation is the National People's Congress. The National People's Congress is held every five years. The deputies are convened by the Bureau of the CDPF and more than half of them should be disabled persons or their relatives. The powers of the National People's Congress are considering reports from the Bureau of the China Disabled Persons' Federation in order to determine working principles and tasks, modifying the China Disabled Persons' Federation charter and electing the Bureau of the CDPF.

==== Honorary positions ====
The CDPF can set up an honorary chairman and honorary vice-chairman, both shall be appointed by the Bureau of the China Disabled Persons' Federation.

==== Bureau ====
The Bureau is elected every five years. During the intersession of the National People's Congress, the Bureau is responsible for implementing the resolutions of the National People's Congress and guiding the work of the CDPF. The Bureau consists of a chairman, several vice-chairmen and several members. More than half of the members of the Bureau should be disabled persons or their relatives. The Bureau meeting, which is convened by the Chairman of the Bureau, should be held at least once a year. The Bureau implements the Democratic Centralism. The Bureau is mainly responsible for personnel changes in the CDPF and supervision work.

==== Executive board ====
The executive board is the permanent executive body of the National People's Congress of the CDPF and the Bureau which is composed of a chairman, several vice-chairmen and several members. There should be representatives from all kinds of disabled persons or their relatives on the executive board. The Chairman is elected by the Bureau of the CDPF, appointed by the government and shall not serve for more than two consecutive terms. The vice-chairmen and members are nominated by the chairman and have to be adopted by the Bureau. The executive board imposed the Chairman the responsibility. The executive board has set up several administrative offices and undertakes the daily work of the CDPF.

==== Specialized Associations ====
The Specialized Associations are composed of the Association for the Blind, Association for the Deaf, Association for Disabled Persons, Association for Mentally Disabled Persons, etc. The Committees of the Specialized Associations are elected by representatives from the National People's Congress. The duties of the Specialized Associations are

- To represent, associate, educate and unite disabled persons in the same category.
- To reflect special wishes and needs.
- To safeguard legitimate rights and interests and fight for social help.
- To participate in international activities.

The Specialized Associations have a chairman, and vice-chairman, which are elected by the Committees of the Specialized Associations.

==== Group Members ====
National Community Groups, which are related to the career of disabled persons and admit the Constitution, can apply for the Group Members of CDPF.

=== International organizations ===
CDPF has also worked with many international organizations.

==== Disabled Persons' International ====
CDPF is part of the National Assembly put together by Disabled Peoples International.

== Journals ==
The organization publishes two journals:

=== The China Disabled Persons ===
The China Disabled Persons was founded in January 1989, and organized by the China Disabled Persons' Federation. It is a domestic public offering of a comprehensive monthly journal of the CDPF, for carrying forward the humanitarian and servicing for disabled people. Being the only national institutional journal for disabled people, the magazine played an active role in promoting the CDPF's work.

The main readers of the journal are disabled persons, their families and other community. The journal distributes to mainland China, Hong Kong, Macao and Taiwan regions, as well as a dozen other countries.

The main contents of the journal include the social problems of disabled persons; introduction of laws, regulations and policies of the country; rehabilitation, education, employment, life and other aspects of information services for people with disabilities and so on.

=== Blind Monthly ===
Blind Monthly is the only Braille cultural publication, founded in Beijing on March 15, 1954, and sponsored by the China Disabled Persons' Federation. The main readership is the majority of blind persons in China.

The main contents of the journal include reporting developments of China's undertakings for disabled persons; introducing Chinese blind persons' work, learning, life and other aspects and publishing outstanding literary works and musical works of blind people.

== See also ==
- Disabled Peoples' International
