= Ye Jianming =

Chinese businessman

- Born: February 23, 1977 (age 49); Pucheng County, Fujian, China
- Occupation: Entrepreneur
- Organization: China Association for International Friendly Contact

Chinese name
- Traditional Chinese: 葉簡明
- Simplified Chinese: 叶简明
Transcriptions
Standard Mandarin
- Hanyu Pinyin: Yè Jiǎnmíng

Ye Jianming (Chinese: 叶简明; born 23 February 1977) is a Chinese businessman. He is the founder and former chairman of CEFC China Energy Company Limited, a now defunct company that used to be a Global Fortune 500 energy and finance conglomerate. He has been under detention in China since March 2018 on charges of bribery.

Prior to its bankruptcy, CEFC China under Ye's leadership was ranked 229 on the Fortune Global 500 List in 2016 and had a workforce of over 30,000. During his tenure, CEFC China funded the establishment of the Hong Kong–based think tank China Energy Fund Committee (CEFC), an NGO in Special Consultative Status with the Economic and Social Council of the United Nations. From 2003 until 2005, he was the deputy secretary general of the China Association for International Friendly Contact (CAIFC).

In April 2015, Ye became an economic advisor to Czech president Miloš Zeman.

== CEFC bribes for oil ==
In November 2017, the U.S. Justice Department accused CEFC of offering a US$2 million bribe to the president of Chad for oil rights and, through its representatives, former Hong Kong secretary for home affairs Patrick Ho and former Senegalese foreign minister Cheikh Gadio, depositing a $500,000 bribe to an account designated by the Minister of Foreign Affairs of Uganda. The energy fund denied authorising Ho to engage in corrupt practices. In December 2018, Ho was convicted in a US federal court on seven counts of bribery and money laundering, following a trial in which Gadio stood as a witness for prosecutors.

== Investigation ==
Ye was detained and put under investigation in March 2018 on suspicion of economic crimes. According to South China Morning Post and AsiaNews, the order for the investigation came from CCP general secretary Xi Jinping. Shanghai Guosheng Group, a portfolio and investment agency controlled by the Government of Shanghai, subsequently took control of CEFC China Energy in March 2018. In October 2018, it was reported that prosecutors alleged Wang Sanyun, former Communist Party Secretary of Gansu province, had accepted bribes from Ye Jianming in 2011.
