= Jiang Mianheng =

Son of Jiang Zemin (born 1951)

- 江绵恒
- Born: 8 April 1951 (age 75); Shanghai, China
- Education: Fudan University (BS); Drexel University (PhD)
- Occupations: Academic administrator, businessman, politician
- Title: Vice president of the Chinese Academy of Sciences; President of ShanghaiTech University; Co-founder of Grace Semiconductor Manufacturing Corporation
- Children: 1
- Parents: Jiang Zemin (father); Wang Yeping (mother)

Chinese name
- Simplified Chinese: 江绵恒
- Traditional Chinese: 江綿恆
Transcriptions
Standard Mandarin
- Hanyu Pinyin: Jiāng Miánhéng

Jiang Mianheng (Chinese: 江绵恒; born 8 April 1951) is a Chinese scholar, entrepreneur, and political figure. He has served as vice president of the Chinese Academy of Sciences and president of ShanghaiTech University. His father was Jiang Zemin, general secretary of the Chinese Communist Party from 1989 to 2002.

== Biography ==
Jiang earned a Ph.D. in Material Science from Drexel University in 1991 with a dissertation titled Point contact tunneling study of the high transition temperature superconductor Bi_{2}Sr_{2}CaCu_{2}O_{8} in 1991.

Jiang also served as one of the head researchers for the Chinese space program. In 2007, he failed to win nomination as a delegate to the 17th Party Congress.

He served as one of the vice presidents in the Chinese Academy of Sciences until November 2011. Then he became president of the academy's Shanghai branch until 2015. In 2014 he was appointed president of the newly established ShanghaiTech University.

Jiang has headed a number of national research programs in alternative energy and other technologies: "coal liquefaction, electric cars, mobile phone networks, particle accelerators, spaceships, lunar satellites and liquid fluoride thorium reactor."

Jiang is a co-founder of the Shanghai-based Grace Semiconductor Manufacturing Corporation, which gained some coverage in the American press for their employment of Bush family member Neil Bush as a general consultant.
