= Qian Gang =

Chinese writer and journalist

Qian Gang (Chinese: 钱钢; pinyin: Qián Gāng; born 11 August 1953) is a Chinese non-fiction writer and journalist from Hangzhou in Zhejiang Province, China who over four decades has written hundreds of articles and dozens of books.

== Life ==
In 1969 Qian joined the People's Liberation Army and was stationed in Shanghai, where he served as an officer and a reporter for the PLA Daily. In 1976 Qian took part in the relief effort following the 1976 Tangshan earthquake, an event that deeply affected him and the subject of many of his later works. Since 1979 he has been a member of China Association of Journalists, including serving as its director. He was also involved in the founding of the periodicals China Disaster Report (中国减灾报), Life Week (三联生活周刊), and the CCTV program News Probe (新闻调查). In 1984 Gang enrolled in the People's Liberation Army College of Art in Beijing and upon graduation in 1986 he became a journalist at the PLA Daily. From 1998 to 2001 he served as deputy editor of the Guangzhou-based newspaper Southern Weekend.

Qian is a member of the China Writers Association. Currently he serves as Director of the China Media Project at The University of Hong Kong's Journalism and Media Studies Center and is a research fellow at Shanghai University's Peace and Development Research Center.

== Works ==
From 1981 to 1984 Qian coauthored with Jiang Yonghong the "Blue Army Commander" (蓝军司令) and "Rushes to the Forefront" (奔涌的潮头), works that won the second and third prize for National Excellent Reporting. In 1986 he published "The Great Tangshan Earthquake" (唐山大地震), a work based on his university thesis. The book again won national accolades and was translated into English, Japanese, Korean, and French. Qian's other works include "Journal of the Qing American Education Mission" (大清留美幼童记), coauthored with Hu Supergrass; "The Qing Navy and Li Hongzhang" (大清海军与李鸿章), "Record of Twentieth Century Disasters in China" (二十世纪中国重灾百录), edited with Geng Qingguo eds), "Old News Reporter"(旧闻记者), "Chinese Media and Political Reform" (中国传媒与政治改革), "The Media situation in China Recorded" (中国传媒风云录), coauthored with Chen Wanying.
