= Deng Pufang =

Chinese politician and disability rights activist

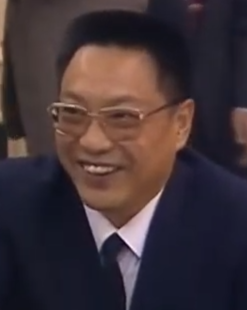
- Deng in 1987

Vice Chairman of the Chinese People's Political Consultative Conference
- In office 5 March 2008 – 5 March 2013
- Chairman: Jia Qinglin

Chairman of the China Disabled Persons' Federation
- In office 1988–2008
- Succeeded by: Zhang Haidi

Personal details
- Born: 16 April 1944 (age 82) Liao County, Shanxi, Republic of China (now Zuoquan County, Shanxi, China)
- Party: Chinese Communist Party
- Parent(s): Deng Xiaoping; Zhuo Lin
- Relatives: Deng family
- Education: Peking University

Deng Pufang (simplified Chinese: 邓朴方; traditional Chinese: 鄧樸方; pinyin: Dèng Pǔfāng, born 16 April 1944) is a Chinese politician, who is the eldest son of former Chinese paramount leader Deng Xiaoping. He is mostly known for being injured during the Cultural Revolution by the Red Guards and becoming a paraplegic. He has since dedicated his life to improving the rights of people with disabilities.

== Biography ==
Deng Pufang was born to Deng Xiaoping and Zhuo Lin, in Yuntoudi Village, Mataian Town, Liao County, Jinzhong, Shanxi. The name "Pufang" was given to him by Liu Bocheng, in the sense of "purity and squareness".

As a young boy, he attended the Beijing 13 Middle School. In 1962, he enrolled in the Department of Technical Physics of Peking University and joined the Chinese Communist Party in September 1965.

During the Cultural Revolution, Deng Xiaoping and his family were targeted by Mao Zedong. He was branded as a capitalist roader. In one session, he was forced to kneel to the ground with his arm stretched out behind him and over his head. His family watched as the students forced him to confess to capitalist ways of thinking.

Mao's Red Guards then imprisoned Deng Pufang. He was tortured and thrown out of the window of a three-story building at Peking University in 1968. His back broken, he was rushed to the hospital, but was denied admission. By the time he reached another clinic, he was paralyzed. He remains a paraplegic, using a wheelchair.

With regard to his views on the Cultural Revolution, Deng Pufang once said, "The generation of the Cultural Revolution is in no sense a lost generation, as is often said. Quite to the contrary. All those who passed through that testing have been toughened. These people think a great deal, and have their own ideas. They are firm in their convictions, and show initiative. To my way of thinking this generation represents a trump card for China and for the reforms which they have set in motion."

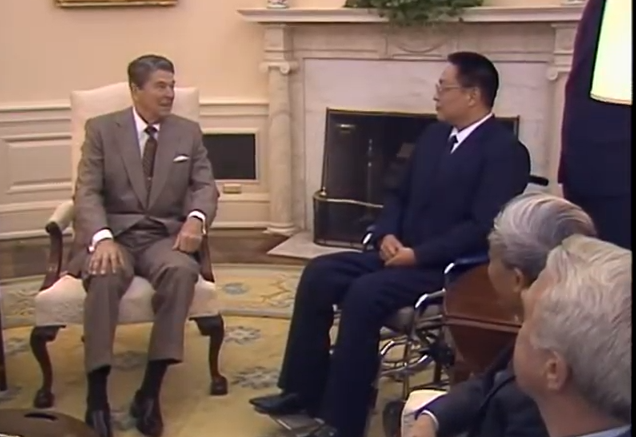
Deng meeting with U.S. President Ronald Reagan at the White House (1987)

It was in 1975 that Deng was given the opportunity to work, serving in the Administrative and Economic Management Department of the General Office of the Central Military Commission. In 1984, he established and became a vice president of the China Welfare Fund for the Disabled as a vice-ministerial cadre at the age of 40; the following year, he was promoted to president of the foundation; and since 2006, he has been the president of the foundation. He also founded and became the chairman of the China Disabled Persons' Federation in 1988.

In 1987, he was the prime mover behind a national survey for people with disabilities. Deng also visited the United States to publicize the challenges of disabled people in China and learn about relevant practices in the United States. In 1990, he led the formation of the Chinese Rehabilitation and Research Association for the Mentally Disabled. In 1991, legislation was passed to recognize mental illness as a disability.

He was awarded the United Nations Human Rights Prize in December 2003 for his work in protecting the rights of individuals with disability in China.

In March 2008, at the first session of the Eleventh National Committee of the Chinese People's Political Consultative Conference (CPPCC), Deng Pufang was elected Vice Chairperson of the Chinese People's Political Consultative Conference. At the Fifth National Congress of the China Disabled Persons' Federation, held in November of the same year, he was elected Honorary Chairman of the Bureau. Deng also helped organize the 2008 Beijing Olympics as the executive president of the Beijing Organizing Committee.

In September 2023, at the age of 79, Deng Pufang stepped down as Honorary Chairman of the China Disabled Persons' Federation.

== See also ==
- United Nations Prize in the Field of Human Rights Prizewinner (2003)
