= CEFC China Energy =

Bankrupt chinese conglomerate

- Type: Private
- Industry: Oil and gas, Financial services
- Fate: Bankrupted
- Headquarters: Shanghai, China
- Area served: Worldwide
- Key people: Ye Jianming (Chairman)
- Revenue: ▲CN¥263 billion (2015)
- Number of employees: 30,000 (2015)
- Website: http://www.cefc.co

CEFC China Energy (Chinese: 中国华信能源) was a Chinese conglomerate. The company was among the 10 largest private companies in China in 2014. In 2017, the company was listed as 222 on the Fortune Global 500. In March 2020, the company—along with its subsidiaries CEFC Shanghai International and CEFC Hainan International—was declared bankrupt. The company used a complex web of affiliated companies to facilitate fake deals, inflate trade figures, and obtain bank loans to fuel its aggressive expansion.

== Industries ==
In 2014, the company generated revenue mainly from oil and gas (60%) and financial services (25%). It also operated in a wide range of other sectors like transport infrastructure, forestry, asset management, hotel management, warehousing services, real estate development and logistics services. A large portion of CEFC's assets were concentrated in overseas markets.

== Controlling shareholder ==
The controlling shareholder of CEFC was Shanghai Energy Fund Investment Ltd (SEFI), which was registered under Ye Jianming, the chairman of CEFC. Fortune described Ye as "China’s Newest Oil Baron" in its 40 Under 40 of 2016 while noting his close connections to the Chinese government.

In the autumn of 2015, Hunter Biden became acquainted with Ye. Ye and Biden worked together for about 18 months, with Biden providing his legal and financial experience to help CEFC establish joint ventures in the United States, such as Hudson West; Biden received fees in the amount of approximately $5 million for his services to CEFC. Biden also worked with CEFC on foreign deals, e.g. State Energy HK in Hong Kong.

In January 2017, Czech President Miloš Zeman appointed Ye as his economic adviser, however, CEFC's many investments in the Czech Republic in the past years were soon noticed by Czech media and led to speculation about whether CEFC was operated at arm's length by the Chinese government. Reuters reported that CEFC had a rare contract to store part of China's strategic oil reserve and "hired a number of former top officials from state-owned energy companies according to CEFC officials... It also [had] layers of Communist Party committees across its subsidiaries – more than at many private Chinese companies."

In March 2018, Ye was detained in China for questioning on suspicion of economic crimes. Reuters and South China Morning Post reported that Shanghai Guosheng Group, a portfolio and investment entity that is a Shanghai municipal government agency, had taken control of CEFC China Energy. On March 2, 2018, CEFC announced that Ye had stepped down as chairman and that state-controlled CITIC Group had acquired 49% of CEFC Shanghai, a subsidiary of CEFC China Energy. (CEFC Shanghai owned CEFC Europe.) In April 2018, CEFC laid off 15,000 employees, who had not been paid for two months. Later in March 2018, the U.S. Department of Justice arrested and later convicted high-level CEFC representative Patrick Ho in New York City on charges of bribery; Hunter Biden's law firm was paid $1 million to provide for Ho's legal defense.

== History ==
On the 16 December 2008, Shanghai CEFC Oil Group Co. Ltd. was established by Ye Ling [叶铃](male), Zheng Jianding [郑坚定] (male) and Su Weizhong (male) (Refer to pages 1-1-43 & 1-1-44 of Shanghai Stock Exchange Filing.)

This was a precursor to CEFC China's official registration in China. In January 2010, Shanghai CEFC Oil Group Co. Ltd. was later rebranded as Shanghai CEFC International Group Co. Ltd. (hereafter referred to as "Shanghai CEFC"). In November 2009, China CEFC formed another subsidiary, Beijing CEFC Oil Group Co. Ltd., which was later renamed Beijing CEFC International Holdings Group Co. Ltd. and eventually Beijing CEFC International Energy Co. Ltd. (hereafter referred to as "Beijing CEFC").

== Czech investments ==
In May 2015, the company acquired a 5% stake in J&T Finance Group. This increased to 9.9% in September 2015. In 2017, the company applied to acquire 50% control of J&T Finance Group, but the Czech National Bank did not approve the deal due to insufficient disclosure of information on the origin of most of the transaction funding.

In September 2015, the company acquired multiple assets in the Czech Republic - a majority stake in brewery Pivovary Lobkowicz Group, a 10% stake in airline Travel Service, 60% in football club SK Slavia Prague and real-estate assets in Prague - the building of the former Živnostenská banka at Na příkopě street and Le Palais Art Hotel Prague. CEFC also bought a stake of between 50 and 90% in Czech online travel agency Invia in March 2016, possibly intending to capitalise on the rapid increase in Chinese tourism to Prague.

In 2015, after CEFC China Energy invested in Czech media company Empresa Media, owner of TV Barrandov and magazine Týden, the tone of Empresa's coverage of China changed: All negative reporting about China was replaced by positive reporting. In 2017, it withdrew its investment from Empresa Media.

== Failed Rosneft acquisition ==
In September 2017, CEFC announced the purchase of a 14.16% stake in Rosneft, Russia's largest oil producer, for about $9 billion. However, CEFC was unable complete the acquisition and paid a deal break fee of about $257 million to the sellers, a consortium of Qatar Investment Authority and Glencore.

== 2018 default ==
In May 2018, CITIC Group announced they would repay 450 million Euros owed by CEFC Europe to finance and banking group J&T within days, but since the debt was not paid a week later, J&T announced it had taken over shareholder rights and installed crisis management at CEFC Europe. Several days later, CEFC Shanghai defaulted on $327 million in bond payments, and offered to make the payments six months after the maturity date.

In October 2020, some retail CEFC bondholders in Hong Kong filed a complaint to the Securities and Futures Commission in Hong Kong against the bond's sole underwriter CITIC CLSA.
