= Fuerdai =

Second-generation rich Chinese

Fuerdai (Chinese: 富二代; pinyin: Fù'èrdài; lit. 'rich second generation'; [fû.âɚtâɪ]) is a Chinese term for the children of the nouveau riche in China. This term, generally considered pejorative, is often invoked in the Chinese media and everyday discussions in mainland China as it incorporates some of the social and moral problems associated with modern Chinese society.

The reform and opening up in the late 1970s has enabled some to accumulate great amounts of wealth. While the Fuyidai, the parents of the Fuerdai, may have reached their new socioeconomic position either through their success in business or through political connections, their children often enjoy a comfortable lifestyle with an obstacle-free life path.

Many wealthy Chinese send their children abroad for their education. In the United States, Europe, Australia, and parts of Canada, well-off Chinese international students ostentatiously consume products that are too expensive for almost all North American and European students. Universities view such students favorably, since they pay higher tuition fees.

== Definition and etymology ==
The term "Fuerdai" literally translates to 'rich second generation'. It describes Chinese people born into families of high socioeconomic status, who inherited their wealth but did not create it.

The term is often used in a derogatory manner, with emphasis on their overindulgent lifestyles and materialistic attitudes.

There is an alternative conception of Fuerdais as productive and educated individuals who contribute to the Chinese economy. In this view, some Fuerdais are not merely indulging in a lavish lifestyle, but sustaining and further increasing their inherited wealth. In response to the pejorative "Fuerdai", another term "Chuangerdai" (创 二代) emphasizes the entrepreneurial attitudes of those born into wealth.

The term has also seen limited use as a general label for anyone with rich parents and who enjoyed a privileged upbringing as a result. Non-Chinese figures, such as Fidel Castro and Donald Trump, have been described by Chinese media as Fuerdais.

== History ==
=== Origins ===
The Fuerdai generation emerged two decades after the reform and opening up in 1978. Amid the mass migration of rural Chinese to urban regions, policies such as the Open Door Policy enabled China's economy to grow quickly. Growing investment and international trade enabled some to accumulate large amounts of wealth, including those who had previously been poor; they are called the "Fuyidai" (Chinese: 富一代; pinyin: Fùyīdài; lit. 'rich first generation'; [fû.ítâɪ]).

The Fuerdai generation succeeded the Fuyidai generation, born starting in the 1980s. Fuerdais enjoyed an improved quality of life after the economic reform due to their parents' wealth. Unlike their parents, they did not create their wealth, but inherited it.

=== 2010s ===
Media coverage in China about Fuerdais increased in the 2010s, scrutinizing their lifestyles. They were depicted as spoiled inheritors who were ungrateful for their wealth and excessively consumed luxury goods. Depictions of the Fuerdai on social media deepened the wider Chinese population's hostility toward Fuerdais.

A growing number of Fuerdais have opted to study abroad for university. In Australia, many university students are Chinese international students from wealthy backgrounds. Consequently, Chinese Australians have developed a disdain toward Fuerdais similar to that of their counterparts in mainland China. The anger directed towards the Fuerdai has been compared to Guanerdai generations that preceded it.

== Characteristics ==
Fuerdais are characterized as beneficiaries of inherited wealth, consuming luxury goods like designer clothing and accessories and luxury vehicles. With mostly unrestricted access to their parent's money, they stereotypically focus on "food, clothes and leisure to housing", favoring well-known exquisite material goods with respect to their commercial brand and country of origin. According to Sherry Jueyu Wu, the consumption of distinct and reputable products forms a part of the Fuerdais' identity as a social class. Social media is the public's primary source to learn about the daily lives of Fuerdais and is recognized by the Fuerdais as a tool to amplify their popularity and influence.

Their parents are often highly influential people with management or executive positions in the private sector or the government, or celebrities such as actors and singers. Owing to their parents' wealth, they face less troubles in life than their less wealthy counterparts. In contrast to the lives of ordinary people, their consumerist lifestyles accentuate feelings about social class.

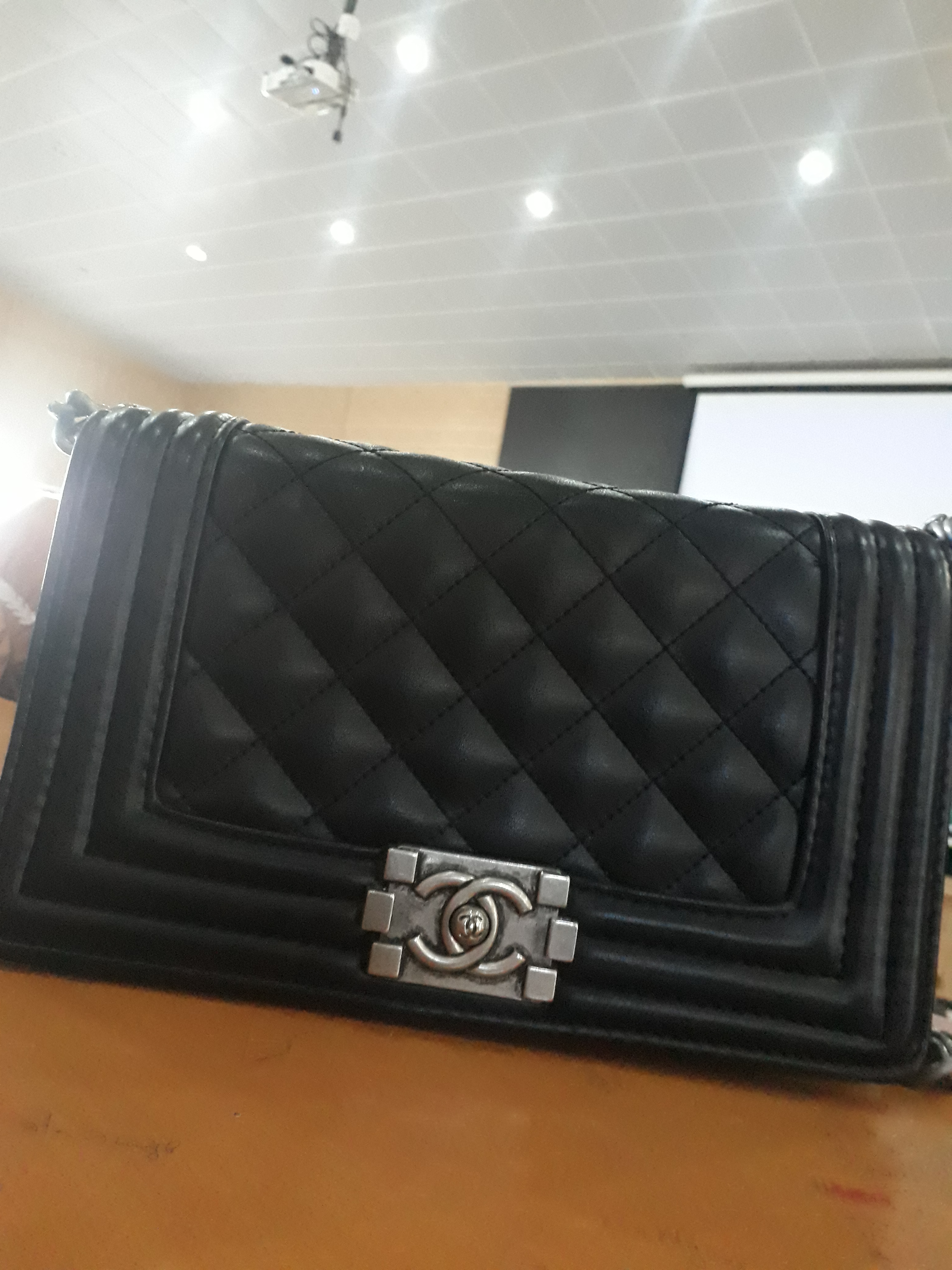
Expensive wallets, popular among Fuerdais, are a symbol of wealth.

=== Education ===
Fuerdais are much more likely to be international students than young Chinese adults as a whole. They often choose to study in Western countries because the Chinese education system is intensely demanding or they want to live in foreign countries, with their affluent Fuyidai parents financing their overseas living. Particularly high percentages of Chinese international students study in Australia (28.9% of all Australian students in 2013), the United States, Canada and parts of Europe. Outside China, opportunities in tertiary education for international students has substantially risen.

The wealth of Fuerdai students is conspicuous in their clothing, luxury cars, dwellings and other luxury goods. In stark contrast, most of the local population cannot afford the same goods. Like in China, Western social media depicts the lifestyles of Fuerdais in overseas countries. Some Fuerdais, following current fashion trends, participate in the Hypebeast subculture due to their interest in social media influence.

== Public image ==
The Chinese public's opinion of Fuerdais is overwhelmingly negative. They are stereotyped as arrogant, spoiled and hedonistic people who engage in negligent and obnoxious behavior that is worthy of widespread condemnation. Media reports on their perceived misbehavior have helped develop the public image of the Fuerdai. Anger toward Fuerdais reflects widespread frustration with social class and mobility in China.

Hostility toward Fuerdais extends beyond scorning ostentatious consumption. After a 2011 murder of a fuerdai, resentful comments included "he deserved to die" and "the murder was nicely done". In the murders of the Fuerdais Ming Qu and Ying Wu in 2012, a commenter described it as "deserved".

Many Fuerdais conceal their wealth and social status, such as by avoiding social media, to avoid vitriol from members of the general public and scrutiny from the Chinese Communist Party. They fear damage to their reputation, which would diminish their wealth, and punishment from the government by means such as imprisonment. Chinese leader Xi Jinping's targeting of billionaires in the 2010s and 2020s further discouraged Fuerdais from showy behavior.

Contrastingly, Fuerdais argue that animosity toward them arises from jealousy of their wealth. A competing perception of Fuerdais is that they are capable successors who sustain and increase their family's wealth.

== Controversies ==
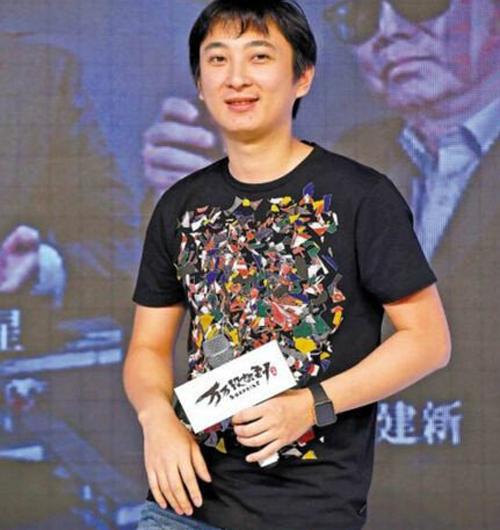
Wang Sicong is the son of Wang Jianlin, formerly the richest man in China.

Incidents that involve Fuerdais have stirred public outrage toward their perceived spoiled and irresponsible behavior. In the stereotypical perception of Fuerdais, their family background, wealth and social influence shield them from facing the consequences of their negligent actions. Such incidents have also adversely impacted their parents, who have lost respect, influence or positions of authority.

In criminal incidents, it is believed that Fuerdais more easily escape punishment for their crimes due to double standards. In the Li Gang incident, 22-year-old Li Qiming was involved in a fatal vehicle accident in 2010 while driving under the influence, killing a university student and injuring another. Allegedly, Li said "Go ahead, sue me. My father is Li Gang." In 2011, he was sentenced to six years in prison. His remark has often been quoted on social media in negative portrayals of other Fuerdais. In 2012, Ling Jihua's son, 23-year-old Ling Gu, crashed while driving, killing himself and a woman. The incident drew much media coverage after initial censorship. His son's misbehavior may have led to Ling Jihua being removed from his position as chief of the General Office of the Chinese Communist Party, among other charges including corruption and bribery.

Fuerdais' ostentatious consumption of luxury goods and publicly known statements have caused controversies. News of incidents on social media, where discussions about Fuerdais are dominated by disdain toward them, have deepened the public's hostility toward Fuerdais. Several controversies have involved their own displaying their wealth on social media. Famously, in 2016 Wang Sicong posted a photograph of his dog wearing Apple Watches worth $20,000 on social media. Moreover, Wang drew contempt for stating that his most important criterion for a romantic partner was "buxom".

== See also ==
- Affluenza
- Nepo baby
- Princelings
- Hua Jing Society
- Tuhao
- Little emperor syndrome
