= Huang Haibo =

Huang Haibo is the name of:

- Huang Haibo (TV host) (born 1965), Chinese TV host, journalist and assistant director of Phoenix Television
- Huang Haibo (actor) (born 1976), Chinese actor
