= Princelings =

Descendants of prominent senior communist officials in the PRC

- Traditional Chinese: 太子黨
- Simplified Chinese: 太子党
- Literal meaning: Crown Prince Party/Faction
Transcriptions
Standard Mandarin
- Hanyu Pinyin: Tàizǐdǎng
Yue: Cantonese
- Jyutping: taai^{3} zi^{2} dong^{2}

Notable Princelings

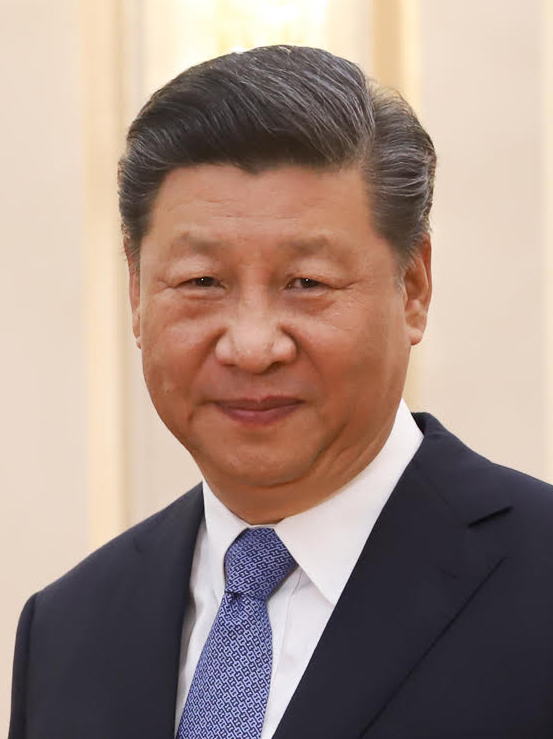
Xi Jinping

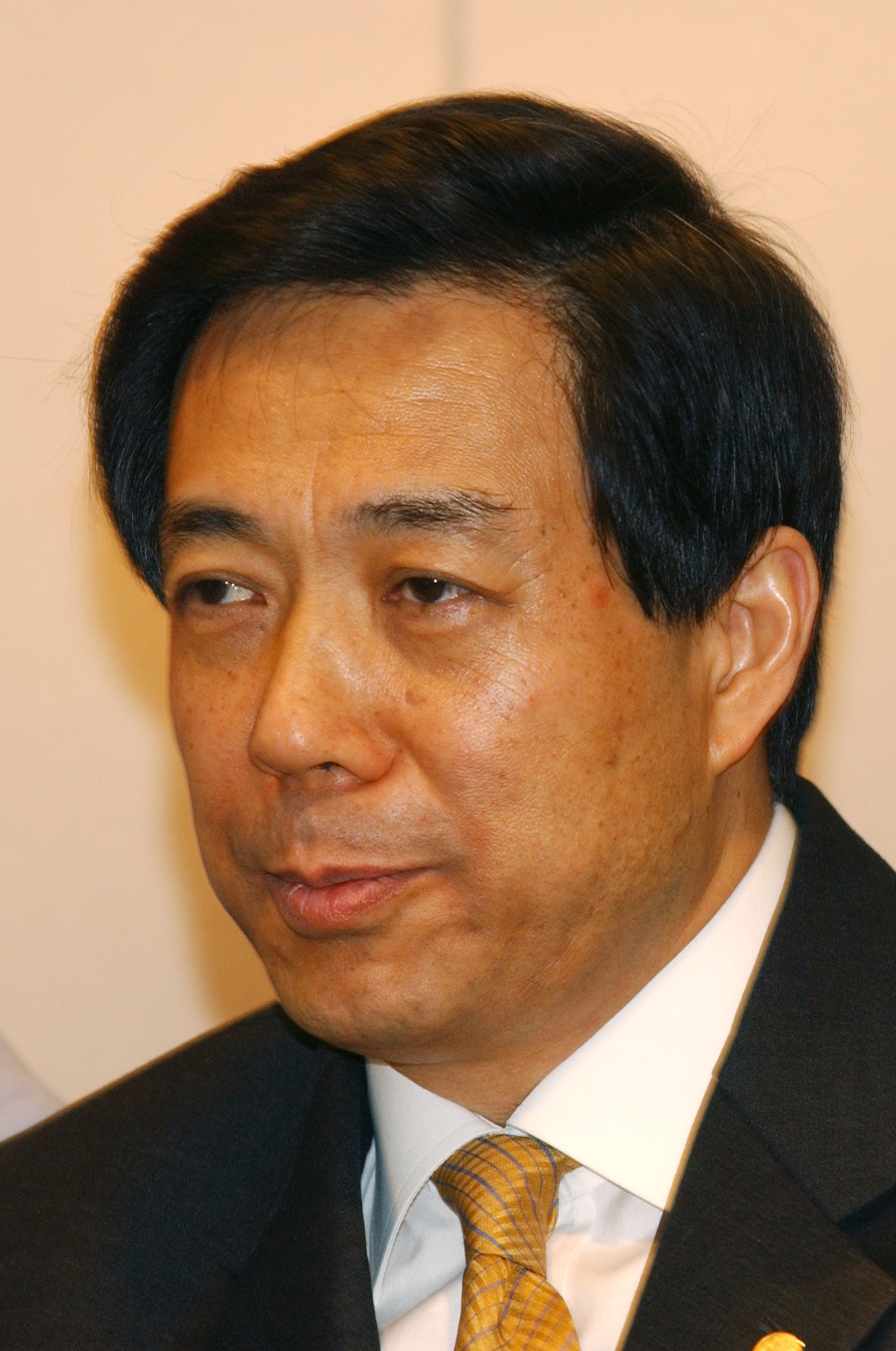
Bo Xilai

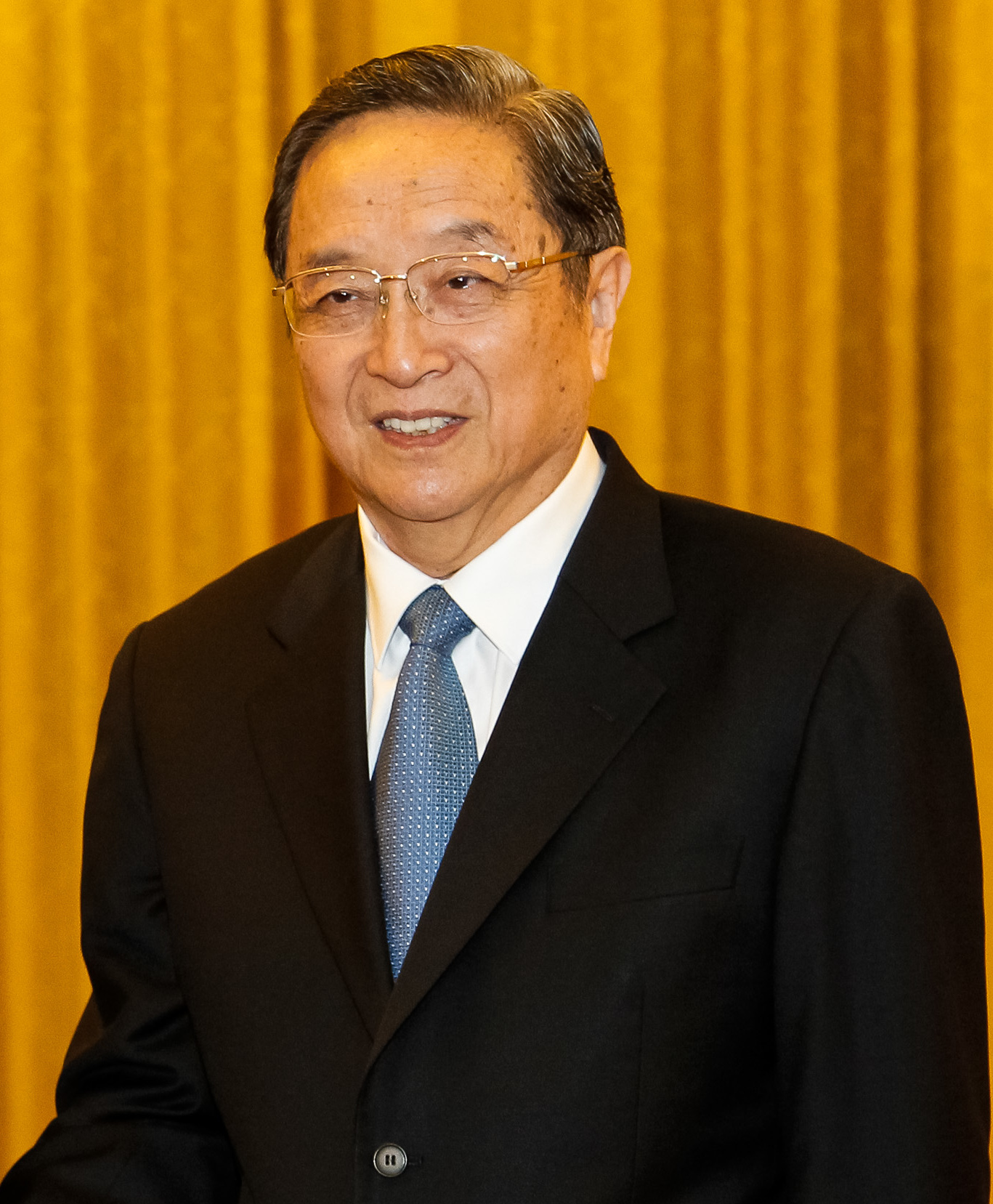
Yu Zhengsheng

The Princelings (Chinese: 太子党), also translated as the Party's Crown Princes or second generation officials (Chinese: 官二代), are the descendants of prominent and influential senior communist officials in the People's Republic of China. It is an informal, and often derogatory, categorization to signify those believed to be benefiting from nepotism and cronyism, by analogy with the crown prince (Chinese: taizi) in hereditary monarchies. Many of its members have held high-level political and business positions in the upper echelons of power.

In contemporary China, "Princelings" are the descendants of senior Chinese Communist Party (CCP) leaders and have themselves risen to high-ranking positions within the CCP. If their parents belong to the first generation of CCP revolutionaries, they are also referred to as the "second Red Generation," "Red Heirs," or "the Red Nobility." Princelings also encompass the sons and daughters of later generations of top leaders, including figures like Jiang Zemin, Li Peng, and Hu Jintao. Princelings exerted their influence in the country either by occupying significant roles within the party-state apparatus, which includes the party, government, and military services, or by controlling substantial state-owned enterprises. Opportunities are available to princelings that are not available to common people. Using their powerful connections they have the opportunity to obtain profitable opportunities for themselves and for others. The more aggressive of the princelings have amassed fortunes of hundreds of millions of dollars. However, there is no discernible political cohesion within the group, and as such they should not be compared to other informal groupings such as the Shanghai clique or the Tuanpai ("Youth League clique"), which resemble intra-party factions with some degree of affinity on policy issues.

Under the People's Republic, the term initially came into use during the Cultural Revolution to describe Lin Biao's son Lin Liguo as well as his close friends and allies who had been promoted alongside him into elite positions of the People's Liberation Army Air Force who were envisioned as the future "Third Generation" leadership of the CCP. In 1966, the Cultural Revolution led to many Princelings to be sent to rural China. Princelings lived in similar villages, worked together, and received their educations together. After some years, the Princelings started to return to home (commonly areas like Shanghai or Beijing) however this crucial period of time had already led many Princelings to form lifelong friendships/partnerships.

Following the death of Lin Liguo in a failed coup and the subsequent purges of this group, the term briefly fell out of use until the 1980s to label the children of the Eight Elders and other First and Second Generation leaders who had been increasingly promoted in the party and were opposed to the efforts of reformers Hu Yaobang and Zhao Ziyang to curb corruption and cronyism. Notable contemporary Princelings include Xi Jinping (son of Xi Zhongxun), China's top leader and Party General Secretary since 2012, and Bo Xilai (son of Bo Yibo), a former Party Committee Secretary of Chongqing who was also a member of the Politburo. The political influence of princelings has weakened significantly during the leadership of Xi Jinping, who has systematically excluded them from the top leadership. During the Xi era, the number of princelings in the Central Committee, the Politburo and the Politburo Standing Committee fell to record lows.

== History ==
The term was coined in the early 20th century in the Republic of China, referring to the son of Yuan Shikai (a self-declared emperor) and his cronies. It was later used to describe the relatives of the top four nationalist families; Chiang Kai-shek's kin, Soong Mei-ling's kin, Chen Lifu's kin, and Kong Xiangxi's kin. After the 1950s, the term was used in Taiwan to describe Chiang Ching-kuo, son of Chiang Kai-shek, and his friends. The latest generation of "crown princes" are in mainland China. The first generation of princelings in the PRC were the children of the initial revolutionaries. These children were initially raised in environments where their quality of life far eclipsed that of the ordinary Chinese citizen, often close to other princelings and senior party officials to develop a network of influence. Many senior leaders often lobbied directly or indirectly for their descendants and relatives to succeed them.

Xiang Lanxin, professor of international history and politics at the Graduate Institute of International and Development Studies, explains it thus:

Historically, how to control local officials who possessed imperial lineage was always a problem. The Politburo is equivalent to the inner circle of the imperial household. Its members, if assigned a local administrative position, can easily overrule any opposition in their jurisdictions as no other party officials can match them in rank and prestige.

Some of these crown princes were able to hold senior positions at the vice-ministerial level or above while still in their thirties, for which other ordinary cadres would struggle for decades. For national party positions, princelings often were promoted earlier and into higher positions than their non princeling counterparts.

It is speculated that when Jiang Zemin was close to the end of his term for his age, he put many Princelings into important positions to appeal to senior leaders of the CCP and win their support for his continued influence. There is a trend towards Princelings taking over power step by step. Of these, Yu Zhengsheng, son of Huang Jing, former mayor of Tianjin, was already a member of the powerful politburo of the CCP; Wang Qishan, son-in-law of Yao Yilin (former vice premier and member of politburo), mayor of Beijing; Xi Jinping, Bo Xilai, Zhou Xiaochuan, son of Zhou Jiannan (former minister of the First Machinery Ministry and Jiang Zemin's former boss), governor of the People's Bank of China, have also occupied important positions since the 17th Party Congress. Princelings have been holding a steady 5-6% of the Central Committee of the Chinese Communist Party (CC-CCP) since the 12th Party Congress until 2012.

In 2013 a "sons and daughters" program instituted by JPMorgan Chase to hire young princelings for positions in its Chinese operations came to light during a bribery investigation by the SEC. At times standards for hiring young princelings were more lenient than those imposed on other Chinese. At least twelve of the princelings were revealed to have used companies in the offshore tax haven of the British Virgin Islands to store wealth in an investigation by the International Consortium of Investigative Journalists.

The political influence of princelings have declined significantly under the leadership of Xi Jinping, who himself is considered one. The number of princelings in the CCP Central Committee peaked in the 18th Central Committee, where there were a total of 41 princelings out of a total of 376 members and alternate members. By the beginning of the 20th Central Committee, their numbers decreased to 10, with the number further declining to 9 with the expelling of Li Shangfu. Similarly, four out of the seven members of the 18th Politburo Standing Committee members were princelings, but all of them except Xi retired after the 19th Party Congress in October 2017. In the 20th Politburo Standing Committee, Xi is the only remaining princeling. According to Voice of America, Xi "effectively excluded the second generation of princelings of his generation from China's highest decision-making and provincial-ministerial leadership". The number of princelings in the leadership further declined with the investigation on Zhang Youxia in 2026, leaving Xi as the only princeling in the Politburo.

== Examples ==
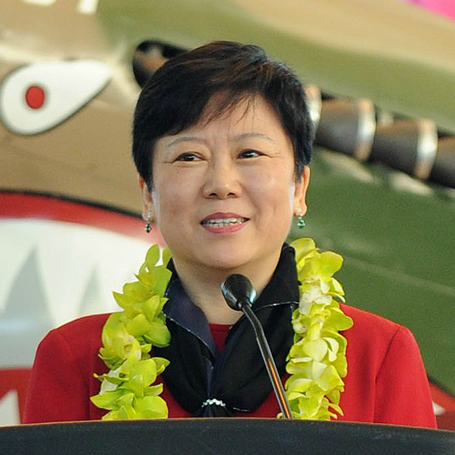
Li Xiaolin

The following are some of the most famous crown princes:

- Son of Ye Jianying: The leader or Godfather of the Princelings was Ye Xuanning, the second son of Ye Jianying. Ye Xuanning was low-profile but influential in political, military and business circles. Many people who ran into troubles looked for Ye and Ye was known for being able to resolve their problems.
- Son of elder Xi Zhongxun: Xi Jinping, General Secretary of the CCP, President of China, Chairman of the Central Military Commission.
- Son and daughters of former leader Deng Xiaoping: Deng Pufang, honorary chairman of the Handicapped Association; Deng Nan, former vice minister Science and Technology; Deng Rong, deputy president of the China Association for International Friendly Contact
- Son of former President Li Xiannian: Li Ping, high-ranking military official, daughter Li Xiaolin Chairperson of Chinese People's Association for Friendship with Foreign Countries, son in law Liu Yazhou (husband of Li Xiaolin) Political Commissar, National Defense University.
- Son of elder Chen Yun: Chen Yuan, governor of the China Development Bank (1998–2013)
- Son of elder Bo Yibo: Bo Xilai, former secretary of the CCP of Chongqing, and by extension, his own son, Bo Guagua.
- Son of Zeng Shan (former interior minister of CCP): Zeng Qinghong, former Politburo Standing Committee member, vice-president of China, and, by extension, his own son, Zeng Wei, who purchased a $32.4 million property in Sydney, Australia. Zeng's source of income is unknown.
- Son of Huang Jing: Yu Zhengsheng, former Politburo Standing Committee member and the chairman of the CPPCC National Committee.
- Son in law of Yao Yilin: Wang Qishan, former vice-president of China, former Politburo Standing Committee member and the Secretary of the Central Commission for Discipline Inspection.
- Son and daughter of former Premier Li Peng (as son of a martyr and protégé of Zhou Enlai, a member of Crown Prince Party, too): Li Xiaopeng, Minister of Transport, former governor of Shanxi, former chairman of Huaneng Power Group; Li Xiaolin, president of China Power International Development.
- Sons of former General Secretary Jiang Zemin: Jiang Mianheng, former vice dean of the Chinese Academy of Sciences, director of several major SOEs such as SAIC; Jiang Miankang, a major general of the PLA
- Son of Wang Zhen, Wang Jun chairman of CITIC; Wang Zhi, former chairman of Great Wall Group
- Son of former President Liu Shaoqi: Liu Yuan, general of the military police
- Son of Marshal He Long, He Pengfei, Deputy Commander in Chief of the Chinese Navy, vice-admiral
- Former son-in-law of General Liu Huaqing: Pan Yue, vice director of the State Environmental Protection Administration
- Son of Marshal Chen Yi: Chen Haosu, former vice minister of the Ministry of Culture
- Grandson of former leader Mao Zedong, Mao Xinyu, major general of the PLA.
- Son of former Premier Wen Jiabao: Wen Yunsong (Winston Wen), chairman of China Satellite Communications Corporation
- Son of Zhang Zongxun: Zhang Youxia, former general of the People's Liberation Army (2011–2026) and first-ranked Vice Chairman of the Central Military Commission (2022–2026).

A list of 226 princelings has been published (see link below).

== Popular culture ==
In late 2015 and early 2016 the term "Zhao family" from Lu Xun's novella The True Story of Ah Q, went viral in China after it was used in an anonymous article "Barbarians at the Gate, Zhao Family Inside" to allude to princelings involvement in a business dispute.

== See also ==
- Hua Jing Society
- Li Gang incident
- Zhao family
- Mazhory, a similar Russian term
- Fuerdai
- Red Prince
