= Invictus Gaming =

Chinese esports organization

- Short name: iG, IG
- Divisions: Dota 2 League of Legends; Overwatch; StarCraft II; Hearthstone; Tom Clancy's Rainbow Six Siege; Counter-Strike: Global Offensive; Mobile Legends: Bang Bang
- Founded: 2 August 2011; 15 years ago
- Location: China
- Owner: Wang "WXZ" Sicong
- Manager: Liu "Efeng" Yuan; Zhang "CuoJue" Guoqing

Invictus Gaming (IG, sometimes stylized as iG, Chinese: iG电子竞技俱乐部; lit. 'iG Esports Club') is a Chinese multi-game esports organization founded in 2011 by businessman Wang Sicong. They are primarily known for their Dota 2, League of Legends, and StarCraft II teams. IG's Dota team won The International 2012, and its League of Legends team won the 2018 World Championship.

== History ==
Invictus Gaming was founded in 2011 by Wang Sicong, son of Wang Jianlin, one of the wealthiest men in China and Asia, who bought the team formerly known as Catastrophic Cruel Memory (CCM) at about US$6 million, in order to promote and ameliorate the professional esports scene in China. It is named after a poem of the same name written by an English poet, writer, critic, and editor William Ernest Henley. Now Invictus Gaming consist of squads for Dota 2, League of Legends, Crossfire, and StarCraft II.

=== Dota & Dota 2 ===
==== Defense of the Ancients ====
The creation of iG.Y after poaching YYF, Chuan, 830 and CH of LGD, historically one of the strongest teams in China, came days after the purchase of CCM. The team is now also known as iG.Z (Zhou, SanSheng, Ferrari 430, Xiao8, DDC). iG.Y got the 3rd place in World DotA Championship 2011. iG.Z was the champion of CPL 2011. Having moved into the DotA scene with the new players, the two iG teams represented what appeared to be the two strongest teams in the scene.

In November 2011, iG decided to combine the two teams and have the team with the best Chinese DotA players. The team was composed of Chen "Zhou" Yao, Jiang "YYF" Cen, Luo "Ferrari 430" Feichi, Wong "Chuan" Hock Chuan and Zeng "Faith" Hongda, in which Chen "Zhou" Yao was the captain.

After re-shuffling the roster of the combined IG, they have won the SMM Grand National DotA Tournament world championship. In 2012, Ig won the ACE Dota Pro-league 2012 and G-League 2012 Season 1

==== Dota 2 ====
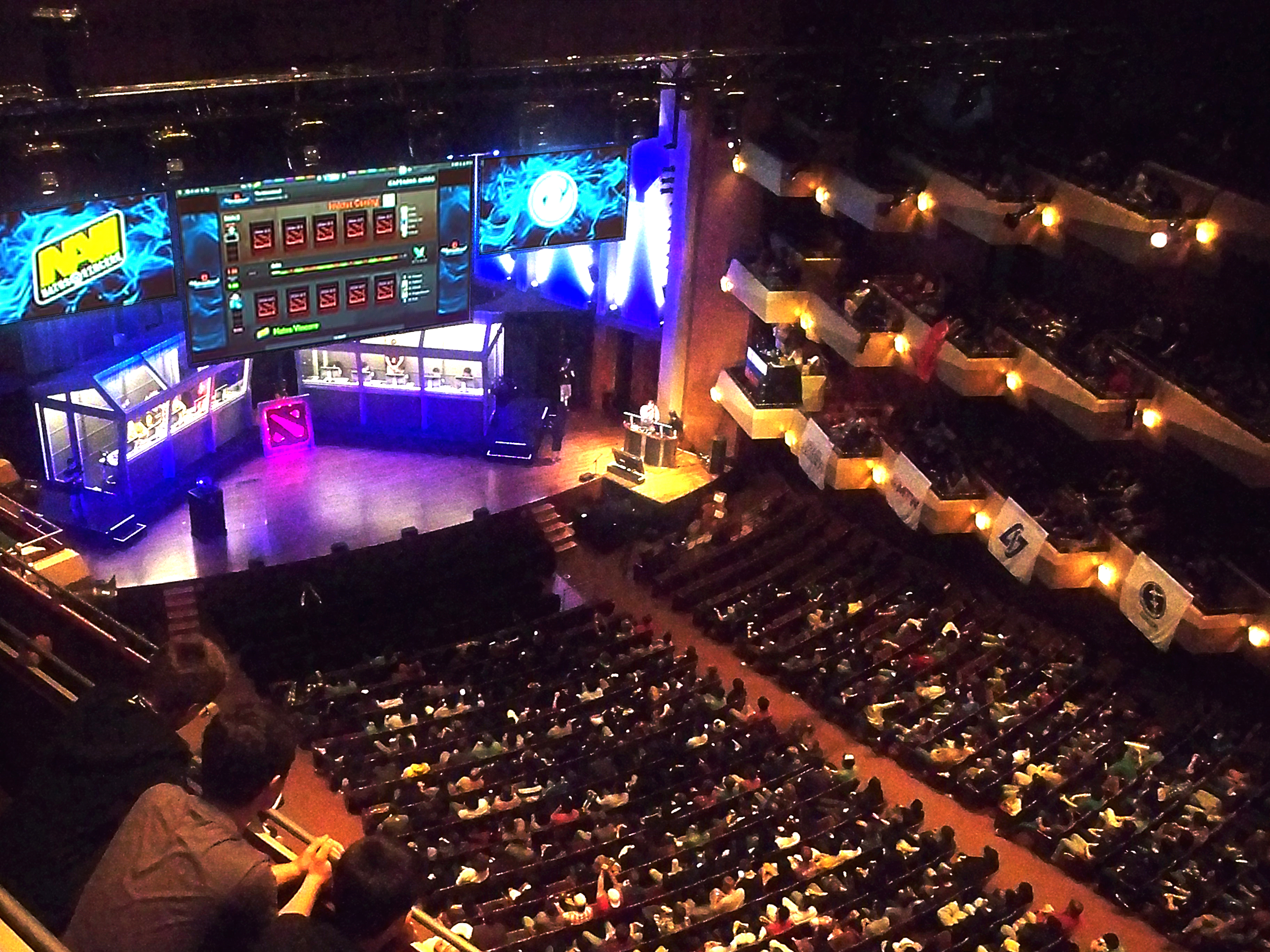
The International 2012 grand finals between Na'Vi (left) and iG (right)

In late 2011, Invictus Gaming's Dota squad started to transition to Dota 2. The team kept on their roster Chen "Zhou" Yao, Jiang "YYF" Cen, Luo "Ferrari 430" Feichi, Wong "Chuan" Hock Chuan and Zeng "Faith" Hongda. They became the champions and won the $1,000,000 prize at The International 2012 defeating Natus Vincere in four games in a best of five series of the finals. The Grand Finals of The International 2 tournament took place in the Seattle, US.

In the same year, Invictus Gaming's Dota 2 quad became the World Cyber Games 2012 world champions. Since Chuan is from Malaysia, the rules of World Cyber Games 2012 restricted him from playing alongside his team in the event. Therefore, Invictus Gaming's dota 2 team found Li "chisbug(CH)" Chen to replace him. It was another impressive performance by iG and DK where they finished the group stages with an undefeated record. They finally met each other in the finals where Invictus Gaming would end the winning streak of DK and later on ending their run with a 2–0 record and take the tournament without dropping a single game.

Invictus Gaming's Dota 2 squad won multiple tournaments in 2012, including ACE Dota Pro-league 2012, G League 2012 Season 1, G League 2012 Season 2, The International 2012 and WCG 2012. They didn't miss the chance to get mentioned when they were nominated in the GosuAwards for the categories of best players and teams in 2012. All 5 members of their team were nominated. Moreover, they won the top places with three players (Wong "Chuan" Hock Chuan, Jiang "YYF" Cen, Luo "Ferrari 430" Feichi) from their squad in the top five and also the prize for best team in 2012. Except GosuAwards, Invictus Gaming's Dota 2 squad was also the team of the year in Liquid's Dota 2 Awards 2012. For Liquid's Dota 2 Awards, Chen "Zhou" Yao got the best Carry, Zeng "Faith" Hongda got the best support and Luo "Ferrari 430" Feichi got the best ganker.

On 2 September 2013, Zhou was removed from the iG roster after two years of playing for them. On 4 September 2013, TongFu and Invictus Gaming made a swap. Hao was sent to Invictus Gaming's direction, while Zhou was introduced as a new TongFu player. On 9 September, Banana was introduced as a new player of Invictus Gaming.The captain position was taken up by Zeng "Faith" Hongda. They won the ECL 2013 and became the runner-up of G-League 2013 Season 1 and 2013 WPC ACE Dota 2 League. In 2014, Chen "Hao" Zhihao and Wang "Banana" Jiao left IG. Wong "Chuan" Hock Chuan returned to IG and Luo "Luo" Yinqi joined as new carry player. After that, IG won WPC 2014. In June, Invictus Gaming became the champion of ESL One Frankfurt by beating Evil Geniuses in the grand final with a perfect score 22:0 in the final game. In August, YYF retired and Faith left IG. The replacements were Lin "June" Shiyang and old time veteran Li "CHisbug" Chen after two years of inactivity. In March 2015, Xu "BurNIng" Zhilei joined the team and Zeng "Faith" Hongda returned to the team. Lin "June" Shiyang left and Li "CHisbug" Chen transferred to a tactical analyst. Then IG got the champion of Major All Stars Season 1.

=== League of Legends ===
==== 2011 ====
On 7 August, the predecessor of Invictus Gaming, Catastrophic Cruel Memory won the title of 2011 WCG China Regional Finals.

In the same month, iG bought the line-up of CCM. Sun "XiaoXiao" Yalong, Zong "Luffy" Yuan, Wong "Tabe" Pak Kan, Lo "Wh1t3zZ" Pun Wai and Siu "ChrIs" Keung formed the Invictus Gaming's LoL squad. In November of this year, Chen "illuSioN" Xin-Lin and Yang "BlackWeapon" Ao joined the team while Zong "Luffy" Yuan left.

==== 2012 ====
In January 2012, they got the silver medal at the World GameMaster Tournament 2012. From March to June, Invictus Gaming completed a reform of the team. Wong "Tabe" Pak Kan, Lo "Wh1t3zZ" Pun Wai and Siu "ChrIs" Keung left the team while former Ehome player Liu "PDD" Mou, Liu "Zzitai" Zhi-Hao and former HanGong Clan player Ge "Kid" Yan joined the team to replace them.

On 28 July they took first place in the Season 2 Regionals Finals, held in Shanghai with 2012 China Joy, and thus earned themselves a ticket to the S2 World Finals. Their world journey on October was stopped by Moscow 5, 0–2 in the final eight.

Invictus Gaming's LoL squad were the runner-up of World e-Sports Masters and became champions of CPL from September to December of this year. Then Yang "BlackWeapon" Ao left.

==== 2013 ====
In 2013, they were the third place of 2013 LPL Spring, the runner-up of G-League 2012 Season 2 and IEM Season VIII - Shanghai.

On 4 April, after three long games with their rival, team World Elite, Invictus Gaming finally came back with 2-1 and won the gold medal of GIGABYTE StarWar League Season 2. After the game several players were enraged because some fans of World Elite threw water bottles at them.

However at Season 3 China Regional Finals on 8 September, Invictus Gaming was successively defeated by team Oh My God and Royal, which was led by their former players Wong "Tabe" Pak Kan and Lo "Wh1t3zZ" Pun Wai, thus losing the opportunity to S3 World Finals.

In December, Liu "Kitties" Hong-Jun joined team as new support. They beat the Korean team CJ Entus Frost and became the champions of Intel Extreme Masters Singapore.

==== 2014 ====
After months of rumors, Sun "XiaoXiao" Yalong finally announced his formal retirement on 20 January.

In May 2014, Invictus Gaming won the second place of LPL Spring. PDD's amazing performance with Kyle helped them triumph over team Oh My God 2–1 in semifinals, but in finals they lost to Edward Gaming 0–3. In December 2014, 2 former core players of KT Rolster organizations, Lee "KaKAO" Byung-kwon and Song "RooKie" Eui-jin, joined as new players of Invictus Gaming after 3 months of ordeal. Won "MaFa" Sang-yeon and Lee "PoohManDu" Jeong-hyeon joined as Coaches. Invictus Gaming was considered big winner of the Korea imports.

==== 2015 ====
Invictus Gaming attended the Demacia Cup in March and made it to the final. However, on 29 March they were knocked from defending the title, swepted 3-0 by Edward Gaming, the team which dominated the series with no loss, thus having place second.

In April, Invictus Gaming finished LPL Spring regular season with in 5th place. In the playoffs, Invictus Gaming advanced 3–0 with wins over VICI Gaming in the first round but then again crushed by Edward Gaming 3–0 in semifinals. On 27 April, with Kid's Pentakill Invictus Gaming won the third place of LPL Spring after beating Snake 3–0.

On 29 April, in the finals of International Esports Tournament Invictus Gaming defeated, World Elite, and won their first title of the year.

==== 2016 ====
In 2016, the IG Team League of Legends team was in the LPL Spring Championships. The IG team was close to the playoffs and lost to the Snake team in the playoffs with a 0:3 loss. In the 2016 LPL Summer Tournament, the IG team constantly replaced the players on the road, and finally got tough in the playoffs. In the first round of the playoffs, they lost to the IM team. In the 2016 National E-sports Contest, the IG team won the championship with a 2–0 victory over the LGD team.

In June 2016, the IG team watched the Pioneer Division to form the iG.Ice team and the iG.Fire team.

==== 2017 ====
In the 2017 IG team DOTA2 Division DAC Asia Invitational Tournament, the IG team won the DAC Asia Invitational Championship with a 3–0 victory over OG.
In the 2017 IG Team League of Legends division in the LPL Spring, the IG team advanced into the playoffs and defeated the NewBee team 1:3 in the playoffs. In 2017, the Degasia Cup Suzhou team lost to the IM team and lost to the semi-finals. In the 2017 LPL Summer Playoffs, the IG defeated the WE team to win the third place, and then lost the WE team 2:3 in the S7 trials, losing the opportunity to participate in the global finals.

In June 2017, the IG team CS:GO division was established.

On 8 September 2017, IG Club announced the official suspension of the operation of the Overwatch project.

==== 2018 ====
In the 2018 LPL Spring, the IG team advanced to the playoffs, defeated the RNG team 1:3 in the playoffs, and then lost to the RW team in the third place, stopping the semi-finals.

In the 2018 LPL Summer Tournament, the IG team successfully reached the final of the summer competition. In the final, they lost to the RNG team 2:3 and won the runner-up. At the same time, they won the S8 Global Finals with the highest team of the year. On 3 November, IG defeated Fnatic 3–0 in the 2018 League of Legends World Championship finals to become 2018 world champions.

In December of the same year in the Demacia Cup Winter Games in Xi'an, defeated the TOP team 3:1 to win the Demacia Cup.

==== 2019 ====
In the 2019 LPL Spring Split Invictus Gaming finished the regular season in second place with a record of 11 wins and 4 losses. In Spring playoffs, IG beat TES 3:1 in the semifinals and advanced to the Spring Split final. They won the final 3:0 against JD Gaming, making this their first split win.

This qualified them for the annual 2019 Mid-Season Invitational as the LPL representative. They finished their MSI Group Stage with a record of 9 wins and 1 loss, losing only one game to SKT. As they finished the group stage in 1st, they chose Team Liquid to be their semifinal opponent. They lost 1:3 in an upset to Team Liquid during the semifinals and ended their MSI run. During the tournament, the team achieved the record (still standing at 2026) for the fastest international victory, defeating SKT T1 in 15:57.

They finished their 2019 LPL Summer Split run in sixth place with a record of 9 wins and 6 losses. They lost to LNG 3:0 in the first round of summer playoffs. They managed to make it to Worlds as the LPL's third seed after 3:2's against JD Gaming and Top Esports in the Regional Qualifier.

At Worlds, IG finished second in their group with a record of 4 wins and 2 losses, qualifying them for the knockout stages. They drew Griffin as their first opponent and managed to win the series 3:1, advancing them to the semifinals. They met FunPlus Phoenix in the semifinals and lost 1:3, ending their worlds run.

==== 2020 ====
Invictus Gaming finished first in the 2020 LPL Spring regular season with a record of 14 wins and 2 losses. They were knocked out of the playoffs in the first round by Top Esports and then lost 0:3 to FunPlus Phoenix in the third place match. In the 2020 LPL Summer Split, IG finished 3rd place with a record of 12 wins and 4 losses. They lost 0:3 to LGD Gaming in the first round of summer playoffs. In the first round of the regional qualifier they beat FunPlus Phoenix 3:2. They then lost 1:3 to LGD Gaming in the finals, rendering them unable to participate at the 2020 League of Legends World Championship.

=== Crossfire ===
Invictus Gaming's Crossfire squad were the World Cyber Games champions in 2012.

The Crossfire competition at the World Cyber Games 2012 was composed of 13 teams and the $25,000 cash prize. Invictus Gaming's CF squad won the grand finals of WCG.

=== Starcraft 2 ===
Hu "MacSed" Xiang got the bronze medal in the Starcraft II portion of WCG 2012. Wang "XiGua" Le was the silver medalist of WCG 2011. Wu "Coffee" Yishen got the third in DH SC2 Masters 2022 Valencia: China.

== Current Rosters ==
=== League of Legends ===
Invictus Gaming League of Legends roster
Players
Coaches

Role	Handle	Name	Nationality
Top	TheShy	Kang Seung-Iok	South Korea
Jungle	Wei	Yan Yangwei	China
Mid	Rookie	Song Eui-jin	South Korea
Bot	JiaQi	Zi Jiaqi	China
Support	Meiko	Tian Ye	China

Head coach

Yang "Daeny" Dae-in

Assistant coach(es)

Won "Mafa" Sang-yeon

Legend:
- (I) Inactive
- (S) Suspended
- Substitute
- (injured) Injury / Illness

Awards and achievements
Preceded by Natus Vincere	The International winner The International 2012; With: Zhou, Ferrari_430, YYF, ChuaN, Faith	Succeeded by Alliance
Preceded by Samsung Galaxy	League of Legends World Championship winner 2018; With: TheShy, Ning, Rookie, JackeyLove, Baolan, and Kim (coach)	Succeeded by FunPlus Phoenix
