= Red Prince =

Red Prince is a term usually applied to a prince, noble, or influential male figure with left-wing politics. The term was mostly but not exclusively used during the Cold War to refer to one of the following three princes:

- Souphanouvong (1909–1995), Laotian prince and politician who served as the first President of Laos (1975-1986)
- Talal ibn Abd al-Aziz (1932–2018), Saudi prince and politician who served as Minister of Communications (1952-1955) and led the Free Princes Movement (1958-1964)
- Prince Moulay Hicham of Morocco (born 1964), Moroccan prince and politician

== People ==
- Patricio Lynch (1825–1886), Chilean sailor
- Archduke Wilhelm of Austria (1895–1948), European soldier and activist
- Scarlat Callimachi (1896–1975), Romanian journalist and activist
- Krzysztof Mikołaj Radziwiłł (1898–1986), Polish politician
- Abdossamad Kambakhsh (1902–1975), Iranian politician
- Ali Hassan Salameh (1940–1979), Palestinian militant

== Literature ==
- The Red Prince: The Secret Lives of a Habsburg Archduke, a history book by Timothy Snyder about Archduke Wilhelm of Austria
- The Red Prince, novel by A. J. Smith

== Other ==
- The Red Prince (film), a 1954 Austrian film
- Red Prince (apple), an apple cultivar

== See also ==
- Princeling, term for a politician of the Chinese Communist Party (CCP) who is a descendant of a senior CCP leader
- Kim family, ruling family of North Korea
  - Kim Jong Il
  - Kim Jong Un
- Pink Prince, a nickname for Norodom Sihanouk due to his affiliation with China and North Korea despite not being a communist
