= Ye Xuanning =

Chinese politician

- 叶选宁

Member of the Standing Committee of the 9th Chinese People's Political Consultative Conference
- In office 3 March 1998 – 3 March 2003
- Chairman: Li Ruihuan

Member of the 8th National Committee of the Chinese People's Political Consultative Conference
- In office 3 March 1993 – 3 March 1998

Head of the Liaison Department of the PLA General Political Department
- In office June 1990 – October 1998
- Preceded by: Jin Li
- Succeeded by: Liang Hongchang

Personal details
- Born: October 1938 British Hong Kong
- Died: 10 July 2016 (aged 77) Guangzhou, Guangdong, China
- Party: Chinese Communist Party
- Spouse: Qian Ningge
- Relations: Ye Xuanping; Ye Xuanlian
- Children: 2
- Parent(s): Ye Jianying; Zeng Xianzhi
- Education: Beijing Institute of Technology
- Occupation: Politician, calligrapher, entrepreneur

Military service
- Allegiance: Chinese Communist Party
- Branch/service: People's Liberation Army Ground Force
- Years of service: 1984–1997
- Rank: Major general

Ye Xuanning (simplified Chinese: 叶选宁; traditional Chinese: 葉選寧; pinyin: Yè Xuǎnníng; Wade–Giles: Yeh Hsuan-ning; October 1938 – 10 July 2016) was a Chinese official, general and businessman.

== Early life and education ==
Ye was born in British Hong Kong in October 1938, the son of Ye Jianying, a Chinese Communist Party (CCP) general, Marshal of the People's Liberation Army, and Zeng Xianzhi, a descendant of Zeng Guoquan and a Standing Committee member of the 4th and 5th Chinese People's Political Consultative Conference. Ye Xuanning was raised in his maternal grandmother's home, in Heye Town of Shuangfeng County, in Hunan province. In 1950, he relocated to Beijing, living with his father. He attended The High School Affiliated To Beijing Normal University and Beijing 101 High School. In 1958, he entered Harbin Institute of Military Engineering (now Harbin Engineering University), where he studied alongside Zhang Yanzhong (张延忠; 張延忠; son of Zhang Dingcheng, Procurator-General of the Supreme People's Procuratorate) and Wang Xing (王兴; 王興; son of Wang Ruofei, Member of the ruling CCP's Central Committee), after which he transferred to Beijing Institute of Technology due to poor health.

== Career ==
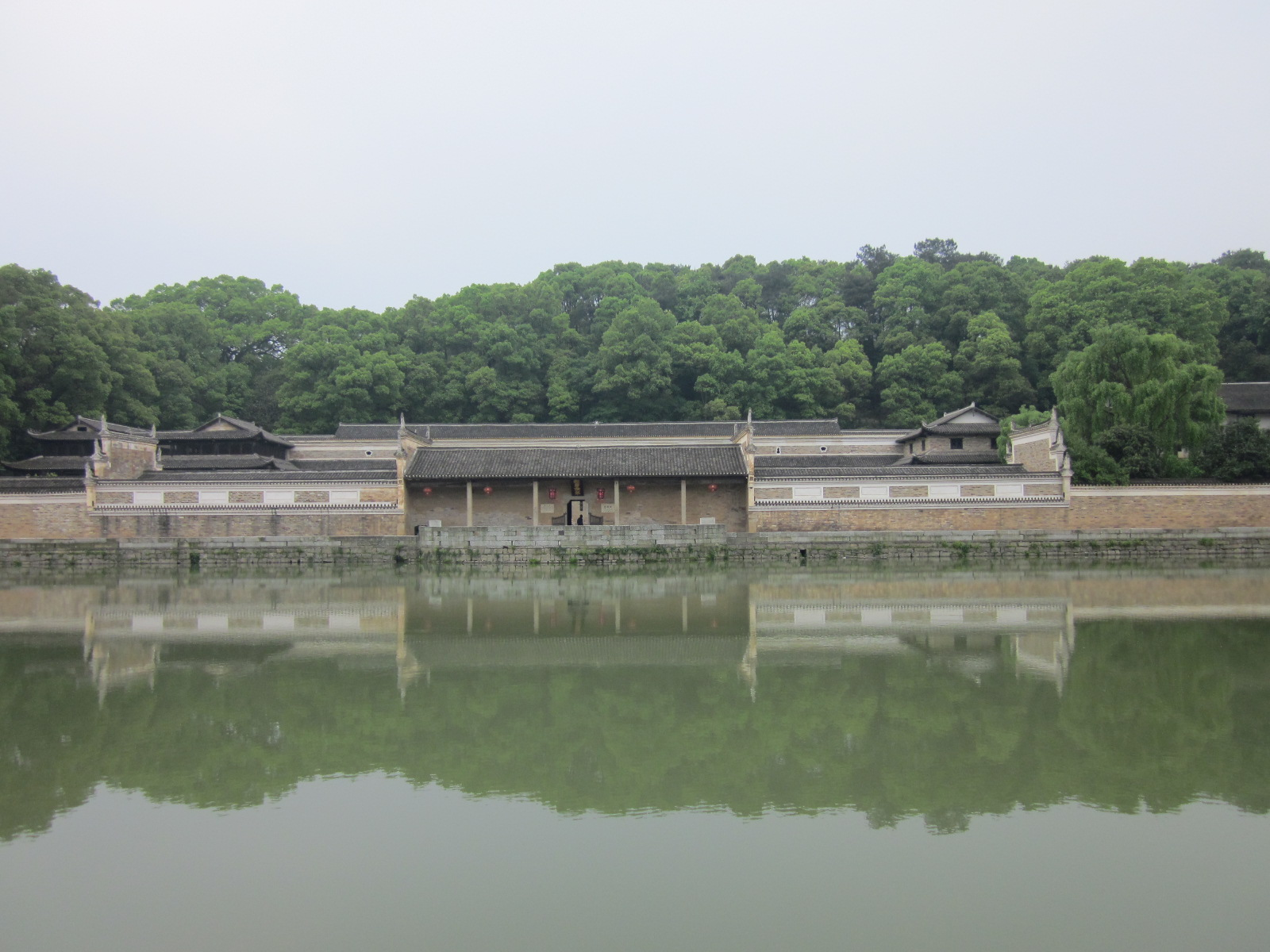
Zeng Guofan's former residence, where Ye Xuanning lived until the age of 11.

After graduating from Beijing Institute of Technology in 1960, he was assigned to a radio parts factory in Zhuzhou, Hunan, then he was transferred to Shangrao, Jiangxi. In 1974, while operating a machine, his right arm was cut off.

In 1978, Ye served as secretary of Kang Shien, director of the Economic Commission of the State Council.

In 1980, Ye had made a crossover from politics to business. He became the president of Canglang Consulting Corporation. In 1984, he served as vice-president of the China Association for International Friendly Contact (CAIFC). That same year, he enlisted in the People's Liberation Army. He was promoted to the rank of major general (shao jiang) in September 1988.

In 1990, Ye was appointed head of the Liaison Department of the PLA General Political Department. In 1993, he became president of China Carrie Enterprises Limited.

Ye retired from the army in 1997. He was a member of the 8th National Committee of the Chinese People's Political Consultative Conference and a Standing Committee member of the 9th Chinese People's Political Consultative Conference. Ye was also a calligrapher, famous for his cursive calligraphy.

On July 10, 2016, Ye died of lung cancer at Zhongshan Hospital, in Guangzhou, Guangdong.

== Princelings ==
Ye was the leader or godfather of the Princelings. He was low-profile but influential in political, military and business circles. Many people who ran into troubles looked for Ye, who was always able to resolve their problems.

== Personal life ==
Ye married painter Qian Ningge (钱宁戈), daughter of Qian Yimin, a CCP revolutionary and official. They had a son. His son-in-law is Wang Jingyang (王京阳), grandson of Wang Zhen, one of the Eight Elders of the CCP.

Military offices
Preceded by Jin Li (金黎)	Head of the Liaison Department of the PLA General Political Department; 1990–1998	Succeeded by Liang Hongchang (梁宏昌)
