= Huang Haibo (TV host) =

Chinese television host (born 1965)

- Born: 1965 (age 60–61); Beijing, China
- Education: Communication University of China; Waseda University; The Hong Kong University of Science and Technology
- Occupation: Media Professional

Huang Haibo (Chinese: 黄海波; pinyin: Huáng Hǎibō; born 1965) is the Deputy Head of Phoenix Chinese Channel; Director of the Chief Editor's Office, Phoenix Satellite Television Hong Kong. He was born in Beijing, 1965, now living in Hong Kong. Huang is married with one daughter.

== Biography ==
Huang Haibo joined Phoenix TV in 2002 after serving China Central Television for several years. More than 20 years experience in the field of journalism, participating in many of the production; scheme and supervising of feature programs and major documentaries.

He himself is also anchoring several current affairs shows and documentary TV columns and sometimes appears at news reporting fronts. Proficient in Chinese, English and Japanese.

== Education ==
- BA in International Journalism, Beijing Broadcasting Institute(Communication University of China)
- Research student of Film Studies, the Graduate school of Waseda University, Japan
- EMBA of School of Business and Management, The Hong Kong University of Science and Technology

== Social Titles ==
- Part-time Members of the Central Policy Unit Hong Kong SAR, 2012
- Representative of 6 consecutive sections of Sino-Japanese Media Conversation held by The State Council Information Office of PRC and The Executive Commission of the Japanese Chinese Journalist Communication, Japan. 2007-2011
- Jury Actualites, The 49th Festival de Television de Monte-Carlo, 2009
- Jury or decision maker of numerous documentary film festivals
- Guest Professor, Hua Qiao University, China
- Consultant, Chinese Studies Program, Dept. of Sociology, Hong Kong Baptist University
- Co-founder and Vice Chairman of Hua Jing Society, Hong Kong
- Moderator of BOAO Forum, 2013
