= World Cyber Games 2012 =

International esports competition

The 2012 World Cyber Games (also known as WCG 2012) took place from 29 November to 2 December 2012 in Kunshan, Jiangsu, China. It was the second time the World Cyber Games (WCG) was held in China. The event hosted 500 players from 40 countries competing for prize pool over $258,000.

== Official games ==
=== PC games ===
- Crossfire (SmileGate)
- Dota 2 (Valve)
- FIFA 12 (Electronic Arts)
- StarCraft II: Wings of Liberty (Blizzard)
- Warcraft III: The Frozen Throne (Blizzard)

=== Promotion games ===
- Counter-Strike Online (Nexon/Valve)
- Defense of the Ancients (IceFrog)
- QQ Speed (Tencent Holdings)
- World of Tanks (Wargaming)

== Results ==
=== Official ===
Event	Gold		Silver		Bronze	
Crossfire	Invictus Gaming (China)	Zhe Ma (MZiN)	Freedom (Vietnam)	Hoang Anh Tuan Pham (Free..Sniper)	MSI-EvoGT.tnc (Philippines)	Dale Duque (DHALEE)
Crossfire	Invictus Gaming (China)	Feng Yongqiang (n1ce)	Freedom (Vietnam)	Dinh Kien Nguyen (Free..Tanker)	MSI-EvoGT.tnc (Philippines)	Jupiter Mars Gaboy (ELGEE)
Crossfire	Invictus Gaming (China)	Qiang Daiyue (18)	Freedom (Vietnam)	Thien Tri Hoang (Excavator)	MSI-EvoGT.tnc (Philippines)	Judan Cruz (KART)
Crossfire	Invictus Gaming (China)	Xu Depeng (4mE)	Freedom (Vietnam)	Phu Thuan Nghiem (Free..Dancer)	MSI-EvoGT.tnc (Philippines)	James Michael Doron (Nasmi)
Crossfire	Invictus Gaming (China)	Shen Chong (Best)	Freedom (Vietnam)	Tien Son Vu (Free..Kicker)	MSI-EvoGT.tnc (Philippines)	Royce Bentley Omega (r4mpage)
Dota 2	Invictus Gaming (China)	Luo Feichi (iG.Ferrari_430)	DK (China)	Xu Zhilei (BurNIng)	DevilMice (Belarus)	Barshak Artsiom (fng)
Dota 2	Invictus Gaming (China)	Jiang Cen (iG.YYF)	DK (China)	Lei Zengrong (MMY)	DevilMice (Belarus)	Doroschenok Maksim (JACKAL)
Dota 2	Invictus Gaming (China)	Chen Yao (iG.zhou)	DK (China)	Yao Yi (QQQ)	DevilMice (Belarus)	Lipai Aliaksei (James)
Dota 2	Invictus Gaming (China)	Li Chen (ch)	DK (China)	Bai Fan (rOtK)	DevilMice (Belarus)	Kachynski Kiryl (Sunlight)
Dota 2	Invictus Gaming (China)	Zeng Hongda (Faith)	DK (China)	Xie Junhao (Super)	DevilMice (Belarus)	Zinavenka Aleh (wejustzik)
FIFA 12	(Germany) Kai Wollin (Acer | deto)		(Poland) Bartosz Tritt (Bartas)		(Argentina) Francisco Sotullo (Patan)	
StarCraft II: Wings of Liberty	(South Korea) Lee Sak WON (ST_Parting)		(France) Benoit Strypsteen (Adelscott)		(China) Hu Xiang (iG.MacSed)	
Warcraft III: The Frozen Throne	(China) Zeng Zhuo (WE.GIGABYE.TED)		(China) Lu Weiliang (Steelseries.Fly100%)		(China) Li Xiaofeng (WE.GIGABYTE.Sky)	

=== Promotion ===
Event	Gold		Silver		Bronze	
Counter-Strike Online	CIRESHII (China)	Ciresoiu Cires (cireshel)	ZINCTHAI (China)	Ning Wan (Richie)	UMX-Gaming (Taiwan)	Tzu-An Chen (cedrik)
Counter-Strike Online	CIRESHII (China)	Ke Liu (MO)	ZINCTHAI (China)	Zheng Hui Liu (z8z)	UMX-Gaming (Taiwan)	Szu-Di Yu (dpker)
Counter-Strike Online	CIRESHII (China)	Bin Liu (Savage)	ZINCTHAI (China)	Wei Shen (4357)	UMX-Gaming (Taiwan)	Tsung-Kai Chen (Evant)
Counter-Strike Online	CIRESHII (China)	Bing Yuan Li (tb)	ZINCTHAI (China)	Hui Wu (qhz)	UMX-Gaming (Taiwan)	Chia-Heng Chen (kandinsky)
Counter-Strike Online	CIRESHII (China)	Xue Feng Lai (XF)	ZINCTHAI (China)	Quan Qing Wu (QZ)	UMX-Gaming (Taiwan)	Yen-Jui Liu (nitor)
Defense of the Ancients	TongFu (China)	Zhi Hao Chen (Hao)	LGD Gaming (China)	Bin Xie (Sc)	Avengers (Mongolia)	Temuujin Khurts (lazycom)
Defense of the Ancients	TongFu (China)	Huang Xiang (Longdd)	LGD Gaming (China)	Jia Jun Liu (Sylar)	Avengers (Mongolia)	Lkhagvadorj Baatar (MoS)
Defense of the Ancients	TongFu (China)	Pan Zhang (Mu)	LGD Gaming (China)	Yu Zhang (xiao8)	Avengers (Mongolia)	Enkh-Od Nergui (Snake)
Defense of the Ancients	TongFu (China)	Zhao Hui Wang (SanSheng)	LGD Gaming (China)	Zheng Zheng Yao (Yao)	Avengers (Mongolia)	Bat-Ulzii Baatar (Tabaa)
Defense of the Ancients	TongFu (China)	Zhi Xi Chen (Veronica)	LGD Gaming (China)	Fa Ming Liang (ddc)	Avengers (Mongolia)	Khangaikhuu Batdorj (Tiffance)
QQ Speed	(China) Yan Bin (Xiong Ba Ge)		(China) Peng Jie Lv (zixi)		No Entry	
QQ Speed; Team	MUMA (China)	Ya Hao Cheng (Mu war Tangshu Cyh)	Border, Our home (China)	Yang Xu (NAIR)	No Entry	
QQ Speed; Team	MUMA (China)	Ren Shang Guan (Guan gaoren)	Border, Our home (China)	Bao Lei (Pencil)	No Entry	
World of Tanks	The RED: Rush (Russia)	Dmitry Palashchenko (LeBwa)	WaveKnight (China)	Chen Yu (FireStorm)	Fulcrum Gaming (United States)	Alex Spillman (hugomaximus)
World of Tanks	The RED: Rush (Russia)	Dmitry Repin (de1uxe)	WaveKnight (China)	Yi Liu (BraveRabbit)	Fulcrum Gaming (United States)	David Williams (Nagatron)
World of Tanks	The RED: Rush (Russia)	Nikolay Bogdanov (Ec1ipse)	WaveKnight (China)	Chen Xu (Avenger)	Fulcrum Gaming (United States)	James Starr (Relics)
World of Tanks	The RED: Rush (Russia)	Maxim Mazein (Inspirer)	WaveKnight (China)	Yi Jiang (Gggggy)	Fulcrum Gaming (United States)	Kirill Bondar (Sov13t)
World of Tanks	The RED: Rush (Russia)	Dmitry Salomatin (K23IEmelka)	WaveKnight (China)	Hua Zhang (PurpleFox)	Fulcrum Gaming (United States)	Emil Muller (CzechMonster)
World of Tanks	The RED: Rush (Russia)	Evgenii Blazhko (Kapp1)	WaveKnight (China)	Junxi Wu (SaM)	Fulcrum Gaming (United States)	Kyle Nieset (Friction)
World of Tanks	The RED: Rush (Russia)	Kirill Ponomarev (Kirilloid)	WaveKnight (China)	Chao Fan Zhou (Unicorn)	Fulcrum Gaming (United States)	Marco Martinez (Fzerox)

=== Official games results by country ===
Country	Gold	Silver	Bronze
China	3	2	2
Germany	1		
South Korea	1		
France		1	
Poland		1	
Vietnam		1	
Argentina			1
Belarus			1
Philippines			1
