= Zhou (gamer) =

Chinese esports player

Personal information
- Name: Chen Yao
- Nationality: Chinese

Career information
- Games: DotA; Dota 2
- Playing career: Until 2014
- Role: Carry

Career highlights and awards
- The International champion (2012)

Chen Yao (Chinese: 陈尧), also known as Zhou, is a retired Chinese professional Defense of the Ancients (DotA) and Dota 2 player who won The International 2 as the team captain. His Id appeared in the loading screen of Defense of the Ancients 7 times. He won 27 champions during his professional career.

== Professional career ==
=== Defense of the Ancients ===
Zhou was first seen playing professionally in Team CD, where he already has the reputation of being one of the best carries in China. In 2009, Zhou became the runner-up of SMM Grand National Final DotA Tournament 2009. In 2010, Loveen's Nirvana purchased team CD. Nirvana won the first season of G-League and the World DotA Championship 2010. Zhou also led the team to win The DotA Razer Global Challenge in 2010.

They also earned a third place in SMM 2010 and WGT 2011. In 2011, Zhou joined team CCM, however, later, Wang Sicong bought CCM and formed team Invictus Gaming. Invictus Gaming placed were runners up at the World Cyber Games in China 2011. As a part of Invictus Gaming, Yao won the SMM Grand National DotA Championship in 2011.

=== Dota2 ===
As the captain of Invictus Gaming, Chen Yao participated in The International 2011, where the team finished in 5th position. A year later, Zhou led his team to victory in The International 2012, and he also won World Cyber Games 2012 Dota2 world championship. However the following year, in 2013, he placed 5th in The International 2013. In September 2013, Zhou was traded, and joined TongFu.

=== Retirement ===
Zhou officially announced his retirement on February 10, 2014. Yao had won 27 champions during his professional career.
