= Zeng Xianzhi =

Chinese revolutionary and politician

- 曾宪植
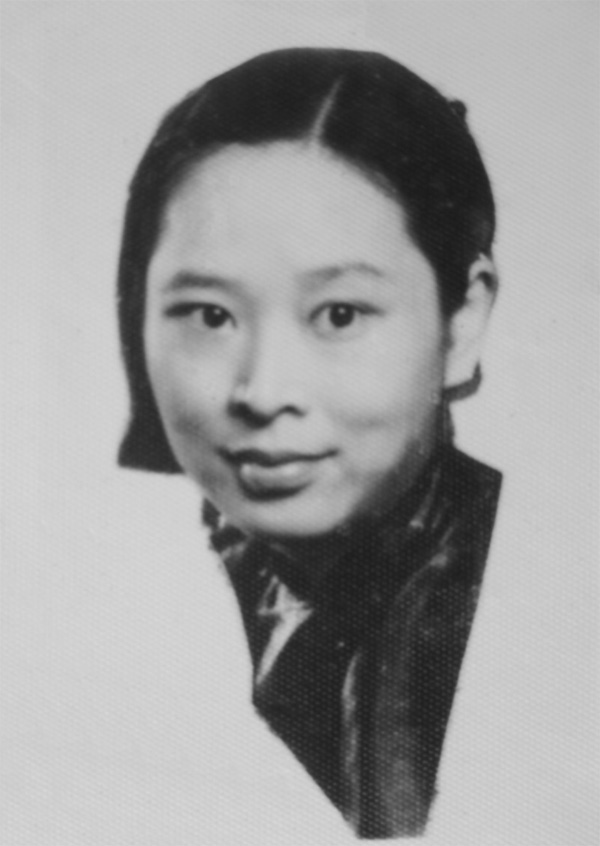
- Zeng Xianzhi as a youth.

Member of the National Committee of the Chinese People's Political Consultative Conference
- In office 6th National Committee of the Chinese People's Political Consultative Conference
- In office June 1983 – April 1988
- Chairman: Deng Yingchao
- In office 3rd National Committee of the Chinese People's Political Consultative Conference
- In office April 1959 – January 1965
- Chairman: Zhou Enlai

Member of the Standing Committee of the National Committee of the Chinese People's Political Consultative Conference
- In office 5th National Committee of the Chinese People's Political Consultative Conference
- In office March 1978 – June 1983
- Chairman: Zhou Enlai
- In office 4th National Committee of the Chinese People's Political Consultative Conference – January 1965
- Chairman: Zhou Enlai
- Preceded by: March 1978

Delegate to the 1st National People's Congress
- In office September 1954 – April 1959
- Chairman: Liu Shaoqi

Personal details
- Born: January 23, 1910 Changsha, Hunan, Qing Empire
- Died: October 11, 1989 (aged 79) Portuguese Macau
- Party: Chinese Communist Party
- Spouse: Ye Jianying (m. 1928–1950)
- Children: Ye Xuanning
- Education: Wuhan Central Military and Political School; South China University; Yan'an Marxism-Leninism College; Central Party School of the Chinese Communist Party

Chinese name
- Traditional Chinese: 曾憲植
- Simplified Chinese: 曾宪植
Transcriptions
Standard Mandarin
- Hanyu Pinyin: Zēng Xiànzhí
- Wade–Giles: Tseng Hsien-chih

Zeng Xianzhi (Chinese: 曾宪植; 23 January 1910 – 11 October 1989) was a Chinese revolutionary and politician.

In the late 1920s and early 1930s, girls in schools was a new thing, but Zeng was a member of the girls' basketball team in school. She became a "student soldier" in a branch campus of Whampoa Military Academy. Zeng was one of the first female soldiers in China during the Chinese Communist Revolution. After the establishment of the Communist State, she spent over 40 years working in the All-China Women's Federation. She devoted her life to the Chinese women's rights movement.

== Biography ==
=== Early life and education ===
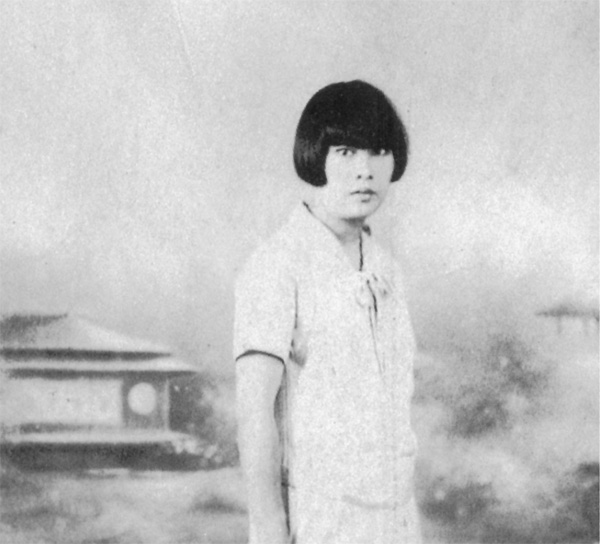
Young Zeng Xianzhi

Zeng was born on January 23, 1910, at Baishutang (百恕堂) in Changsha, Hunan, with her ancestral home in Xiangxiang (now Shuangfeng County). She was a descendant of Zeng Guoquan, a renowned general in the late Qing Empire and one of three brothers of Zeng Guofan. She had five siblings. Her siblings were, in order of birth: Zeng Xianpu (曾宪朴; 曾憲樸; 1908–1966), Zeng Xiankai (曾宪楷; 曾憲楷; 1908–1985), Zeng Xianzhen (曾憲榛; 1911–1997), Zeng Xianzhu (曾宪柱; 曾憲柱; 1919–1986), and Zeng Xianju (曾宪矩; 曾憲矩). In 1916 she attended Changsha Gudaotian Normal School (长沙古稻田师范学校; 長沙古稻田師範學校). Under the influence of Xu Teli, she threw herself into China's revolution. In 1926, she was accepted to the Wuhan Central Military and Political Academy. Whilst still nominally at school she participated in the Northern Expedition.

=== Revolutionary career ===
In 1927, Zeng went to Guangzhou to help organize the Guangzhou Uprising. She joined the Chinese Communist Party (CCP) in 1928. She was a member of the CCP underground in Shanghai under "legal" cover as a student of South China University. In May 1929 she was arrested by the Nationalist government for participating in anti-government protests. After her release she pursued advanced studies in Japan.

Zeng returned to China in 1931. In 1937 she worked in Xinhua Daily in Wuhan, capital of Hubei province. Two years later, she was transferred to Guilin as traffic coordinator of the Eighth Route Army. In 1941 she entered the Yan'an Marxism–Leninism College and the Central Party School of the Chinese Communist Party; after graduation, she worked in the Dihou Gongzuo Department of the CCP Central Committee (中共中央敌后工作部; 中共中央敵後工作部). In the spring of 1946, she attended the Chongqing Negotiations with the Communist delegation. She successively served as secretary of Deng Yingchao and group leader of the Southern Bureau Women's Group (南方局妇女组; 南方局婦女組). In March 1947, she transferred to the Shanxi-Chahaer-Hebei Border Region (晋察冀边区; 晉察冀邊區) and attended the Land Reform Movement (土地改革运动; 土地改革運動).

=== After the founding of the Communist State ===
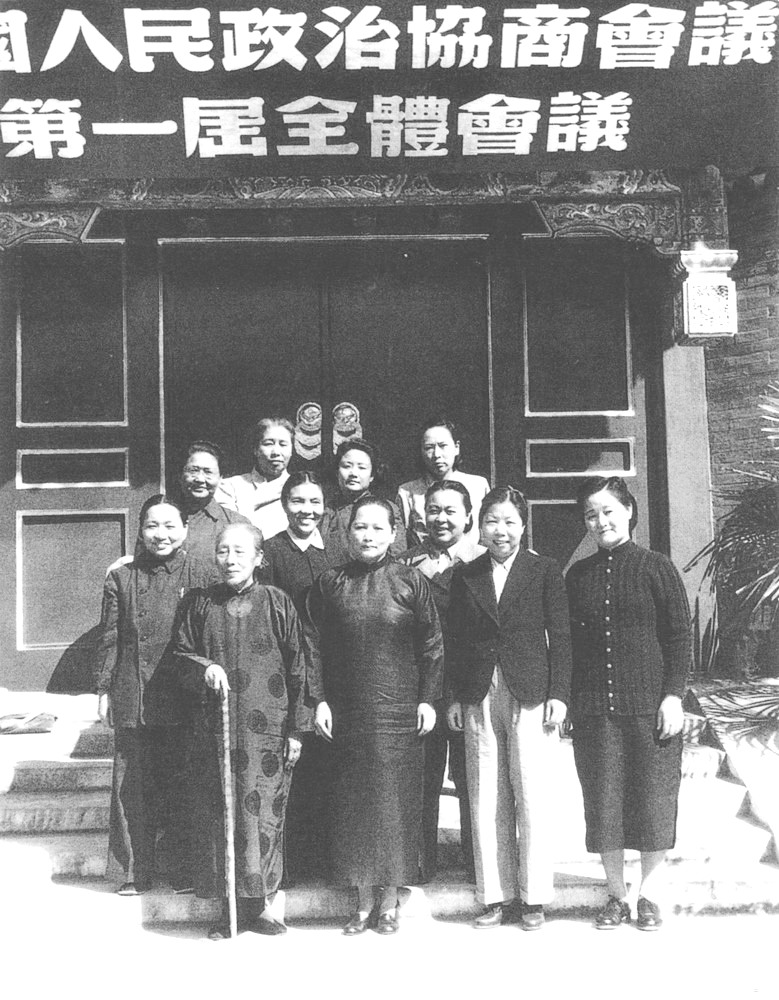
In September 1949, Zeng Xianzhi (Zeng is first from the back row) at the First National Women's Congress in Beijing

At the beginning of 1949, Zeng was appointed deputy secretary-general of the First National Women's Congress. This was China's first national congress for women and 500 delegates heard Mao Zedong tell them to increase production and to demand their rights.

After the congress Zeng worked in the All-China Women's Federation until the Cultural Revolution. During the Cultural Revolution, she was called a "big black umbrella" (牛鬼蛇神的黑保护伞; 牛鬼蛇神的黑保護傘) and "alien-class element" (混进革命阵营的阶级异己分子; 混進革命陣營的異己分子) by the Communist government, and she was sent to the May Seventh Cadre Schools in Hengshui County, Hebei to be re-educated and to do farm work. In 1974, after seeing his mother's unfair treatment, Ye Xuanning wrote a letter to Mao Zedong who approved Zeng's return to Beijing.

In September 1978, Zeng was elected vice-president of the All-China Women's Federation at the Fourth National Women's Congress. She was a delegate to the 1st National People's Congress, a member of the 3rd and 6th National Committee of the Chinese People's Political Consultative Conference, and a Standing Committee member of the 4th and 5th National Committee of the Chinese People's Political Consultative Conference.

On October 11, 1989, she died in Macau.

== Personal life ==
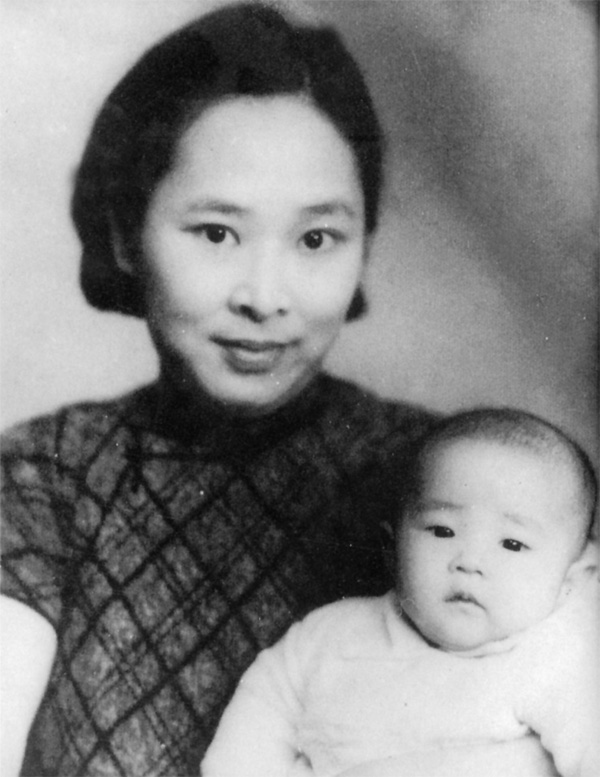
In 1938, Zeng holds her son, Ye Xuanning.

In 1928, Zeng married Ye Jianying, who later became one of the founding Ten Marshals of the People's Republic of China. They had a son, Ye Xuanning (1938–2016).
