= Wang Sicong =

Chinese businessman

- 王思聪
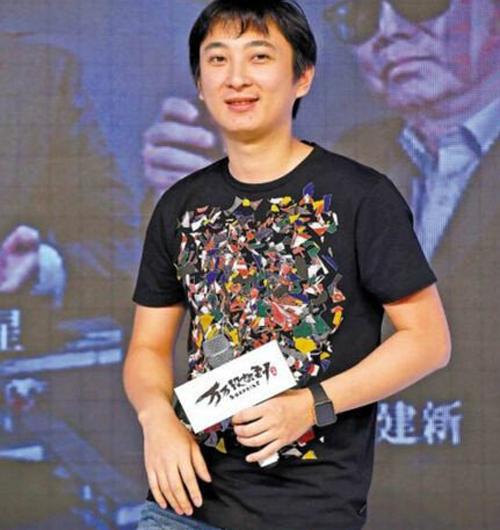
- Wang in 2015
- Born: 3 January 1988 (age 38); Dalian, Liaoning, China
- Education: Winchester College
- Occupations: CEO, Panda TV
- Parent(s): Wang Jianlin, Lin Ning

Wang Sicong (Chinese: 王思聪; pinyin: Wáng Sīcōng; born 3 January 1988) is a Chinese businessman, and the only son of Chinese business magnate Wang Jianlin.

== Early life ==
Wang Sicong was born in Dalian, Liaoning, China, in 1988. His father Wang Jianlin is the chairman of the Dalian Wanda Group, China's largest real estate developer, as well as the world's largest movie theater operator.

When Wang was young, he attended Swiss Cottage Primary School in Singapore and then entered Winchester College in United Kingdom. After graduating from Winchester College, he enrolled at the University College London (UCL) Department of Philosophy. However, there is no evidence showing that he successfully obtained his BA degree from UCL.

== Career ==
Wang is the chairman of Prometheus Capital, a private equity company he founded with CNY500 million that his father gave to him 'for trial and error'. He served as a director of the Dalian Wanda Group twice, from 7 August 2009 to 8 March 2011, and from 26 January 2016 to 29 August 2022.

In 2011 Wang founded the professional esports organization Invictus Gaming (iG). IG went on to win The International 2012 Dota 2 championship the next year, as well as the 2018 League of Legends World Championship.

Wang reportedly spent US$516.7 million on the construction of the Wanda Reign seven-star hotel in Shanghai, which opened in June 2016. The hotel was designed by the British architect Norman Foster.

Wang also founded the music management company Banana Culture in 2015. As of 2017 it was managing the Chinese promotions for Korean pop groups T-ara and EXID. In 2021, the company was acquired by VSPN. Wang was given the function of "vice chairman of the company’s strategy committee" following the acquisition.

On 27 November 2023, Wang and the Tai'an Municipal Government signed a cultural tourism project with a total investment of approximately 3.7 billion yuan.

=== Panda TV ===
In 2015, Sicong launched Panda TV, an e-sports streaming channel designed to compete with Amazon's Twitch. In March 2019, CEO Zhang Juyuan announced that Panda TV would cease operations due to cash flow problems. According to financial news sources in China, broadband server expenses and celebrity streamer salaries were too high to sustain operations. Sicong had a 40% share in the company. Tencent took Panda TV's place as China's main game streaming platform. Following the bankruptcy of Panda TV, a Beijing court shortly imposed spending limits on him as he paid back investors.

According to reporting by the 21st Century Business Herald, after the failure of Panda TV, his father refused to provide financial support to cover his losses, but his mother supported Wang with another 100 million RMB.

== Public image ==
Wang is frequently nicknamed online as "the people's husband", "China's most eligible bachelor", or "China's richest son".

Wang is considered an example of fu'erdai, known for throwing parties, posting pictures which flaunt his wealth, and speaking with celebrities. He was widely criticized when stating the criteria of his potential partners, with one of the requirements being "buxom". In 2021 he attracted controversy over abusive comments he made against a female celebrity after being romantically rejected.

In April 2022, days after questioning the use of traditional Chinese medicine to treat COVID-19, Wang was banned from Weibo, where he had more than 40.5 million followers.
