= Ferrari 430 (gamer) =

Chinese esports player (born 1990)

Ferrari_430
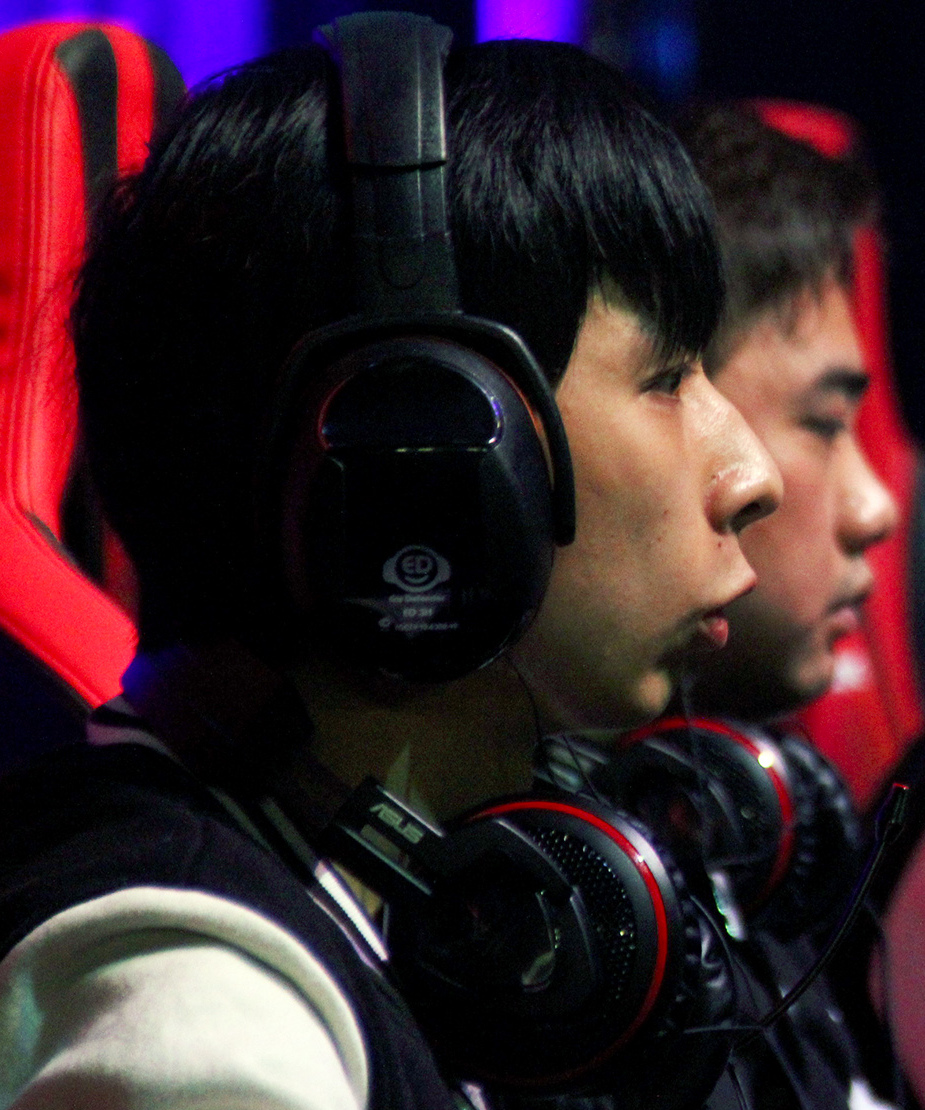
- Luo in 2015

Personal information
- Name: Luo Feichi
- Nickname: The Pianist
- Born: February 14, 1990 (age 36)
- Nationality: Chinese

Career information
- Games: Defense of the Ancients; Dota 2
- Playing career: 2010–2020
- Role: Solo middle

Career highlights and awards
- The International champion (2012)

Luo Feichi (simplified Chinese: 骆非池; traditional Chinese: 駱非池; pinyin: Luò Fēichí, born February 14, 1990), known by the gamer tag Ferrari_430, is a Chinese professional Dota 2 player from Hubei. He won The International 2012 with Invictus Gaming (iG).

== Professional career ==
=== Early career ===
Ferrari started his career at Mr, but he wasn't known at the time. In April 2010 he joined the team ToT. Although the team was very young, they showed admirable performances in many tournaments. During this time, Ferrari got a second-place victory at Intel Extreme Masters Season V Global Challenge and defeating EHOME in ADC in 2010 with team ToT. But because of sponsorship problems the team disbanded. Then Ferrari joined CityHunters but he left the team one month later. Later in 2010 he joined Deity with his teammate LongDD. There he finally made a name with his skills. With the 2nd place in the G-League, World DotA Championship (WDC) 2010 and a 4th place in SMM Grand National Final DotA Tournament 2010, Ferrari was awarded as the best newcomer of 2010.

=== CCM ===
During the great Chinese reshuffle at the start of 2011, 430 joined CCM along with Zhou, xiao8 and ddc. CCM immediately displayed great performances by winning the Erwan Cup. However, they got disqualified in the subsequent DMT due to transferring a tango for his teammate to sell. CCM participated in Malaysia's IPDC and won, stomping LGD and Scythe in the process, using Invoker and Ancient Apparition in these two games. They then won VSEL, WCG Side Event, ECL and G1 League. However, CCM participated in Starswar 6 in poor form, losing to both EHOME and Tyloo, placing 4th.

=== IG ===
In 2011 Invictus Gaming bought over the whole CCM line-up. Invictus Gaming includes two team which are iG.Z, the previous CCM, and iG.Y, the members from previous LGD. Ferrari became the solo player of iG.Z. iG.Z participated in WCG China and The International 2011, and underperformed. Subsequently, iG.Z did not meet all sorts of expectations by being defeated in the Round of 8 during WDC. In November 2011, iG decided to combine the two teams iG.Z and iG.Y, to team Invictus Gaming. The merging proved to be a positive change as iG went undefeated at SMM 2011 to win gold right after it. On the World Tour against DK, 430 gained a lot of fame after managing to achieve a solo kill on rOtk's Broodmother without invisibility detection using only Templar Assassin's splash damage.

In that year, he was the champion of The International 2012 with Invictus Gaming. IG won World Cyber Games 2012. He was evaluated as the best solo player of 2012 by GosuGamers.net and the best ganker by Liquid's Dota 2 Awards 2012. iG got 4th at The International 2013. After finishing outside of the Top 8 at TI4 and the Top 12 at Ti5, iG have steadily fallen, missing out on The Frankfurt Major due to visa issues and failing to qualify for any Major or LAN throughout 2016. Most recently, the team placed fifth at the TI6 Chinese Qualifiers.
