= Hua Jing Society =

- Traditional Chinese: 香港華菁會
- Simplified Chinese: 香港华菁会
Transcriptions
Standard Mandarin
- Hanyu Pinyin: Xiānggǎng Huá Jīng Huì
Yue: Cantonese
- Jyutping: hoeng1 gong2 waa4 zing1 wui5

The Hua Jing Society is an organization based in Hong Kong that serves to network princelings. It is a social club for princelings who have studied outside of China and then moved to Hong Kong.

== Founding by Fang Fang ==
The organization was started in 2011 by Fang Fang, who was CEO of JP Morgan's China division. Fang resigned in March 2014 while JP Morgan was under investigation for hiring princelings, and was quoted as saying "You all know I have always been a big believer of the Sons and Daughters program." Fang was involved in the giving Gao Jue, son of Gao Hucheng, a job within JP Morgan even though Gao Jue was deemed unqualified by the bank. The New York Times stated that Fang's "deep network of contacts in Chinese government and business circles helped introduce a flow of lucrative underwriting and advisory roles to the bank."

Two days after his resignation, ICAC searched JP Morgan's office in Central to get documents from his office. Fang was arrested by ICAC in May 2014 and released on bail, with the condition that he not leave Hong Kong. In 2016, JP Morgan paid USD $264 million to the United States to resolve allegations it hired Chinese princelings. In 2017, The Federal Reserve of the United States said it was seeking to fine Fang Fang $1 million and permanently ban him from working in the banking industry for his involvement in a corrupt hiring program.

== History ==
According to the 2019 book Routledge Handbook of Contemporary Hong Kong, the organization participates in activities that emphasize cultivating interactions between Hong Kong and mainland China. It was a supporter of CY Leung's election in 2012, and after he became Chief Executive, many members of the Hua Jing Society were appointed into government committees. Examples listed by the book include Fang Fang, who was appointed to the government's Commission of Strategic Development twice, spanning 2013 to 2017. Another member, Judy Chen Qing, served in the Central Policy Unit, the Major Sports Events Committee, and the Civic Education Committee. Chen Shuang, another member, was appointed to the newly-created Financial Services Development Council in 2013.

== Notable members and description ==
The Routledge Handbook of Contemporary Hong Kong provides backgrounds about some members as of May 2017, including but not limited to the following:

Chairman:

- Fang Fang- In 2008 he became a member of the Chinese People's Political Consultative Conference, and in 2010, he became a member of the Standing Committee of the All China Youth Federation

Chair:

- Judy Chen Qing- Daughter of Chen Zuo'er, who was the Deputy Head of the Hong Kong and Macau Affairs Office. Her husband is the nephew of Li Ka-Shing. She is a member of the 11th committee of All-China Youth Federation.

Executive Chair:

- Zhang Yi- member of the Shanghai Political Consultative Conference and All-China Youth Federation

Vice Chair:

- Dong Jie- Granddaughter of Dong Qiwu, a former general of the PLA. Dong Jie is married to Frank Chan Shung-fai, who is a member of the Election Committee and a frequently absent member of the North District Council. Frank Chan Shung-fai was also named in the Paradise Papers.
- Meng Mingyi- son of Meng Xiaosu, the "godfather of real estate," who was also the former secretary of Wan Li
- Zhang Sheng- Undersecretary General of Hong Kong United Youth Association
- Chen Shuang- CEO of CIMC Capital

Honorary Chairmen:

- Li Ning- gymnast and sportswear apparel founder
- Leon Lai Ming- actor and singer

Others:

- Li Qianxin- elder daughter of Li Zhanshu

Honorary Patrons:

- Carrie Lam- Chief Executive of Hong Kong
- CY Leung- former Chief Executive of Hong Kong

== See also ==
- Princelings
- Fuerdai
