= Ye Jianying =

Chinese communist leader and politician (1897–1986)

Yuanshuai Ye Jianying
- 叶剑英
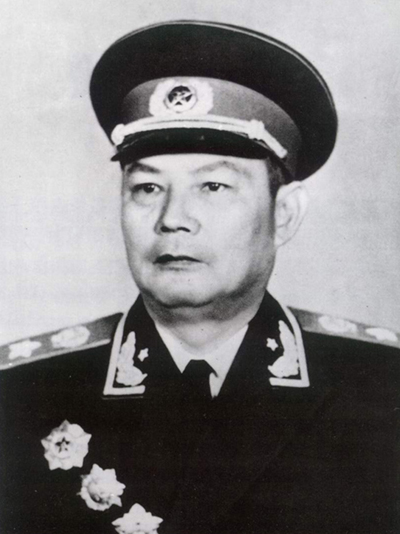

3rd Chairman of the Standing Committee of the National People's Congress
- In office 5 March 1978 – 17 June 1983
- Preceded by: Soong Ching-ling (acting)
- Succeeded by: Peng Zhen

Vice Chairman of the Chinese Communist Party
- In office 30 August 1973 – 12 September 1982
- Chairman: Mao Zedong; Hua Guofeng; Hu Yaobang

3rd Minister of National Defense
- In office 17 January 1975 – 26 February 1978
- Premier: Zhou Enlai; Hua Guofeng
- Preceded by: Marshal Lin Biao
- Succeeded by: Marshal Xu Xiangqian

Member of the National People's Congress
- In office 15 September 1954 – 6 June 1983
- Constituency: Guangdong At-large (54–59); PLA At-large (59–83)

1st Mayor of Guangzhou
- In office 1949–1952
- Preceded by: Position Created
- Succeeded by: He Wei

Personal details
- Born: 葉劍英; 28 April 1897 Mei County, Guangdong, Qing Dynasty
- Died: 22 October 1986 (aged 89) Beijing, China
- Party: Chinese Communist Party (1927–1985)
- Children: 7, including Ye Xuanping
- Relatives: Zou Jiahua (son-in-law)
- Education: Yunnan Military Academy; Communist University of the Toilers of the East
- Nickname(s): 叶帅 (Marshal Ye) 花帅 ("Playboy Marshal")

Military service
- Allegiance: Republic of China; China
- Branch/service: People's Liberation Army Ground Force (Republic of China (1912–1949)) 18th Army Group, NRA; Chinese Workers' and Peasants' Red Army (Republic of China (1912–1949)) 1st Army and 4th Army, National Revolutionary Army
- Years of service: 1917–1985
- Rank: Marshal of the People's Republic of China; Lieutenant general of the National Revolutionary Army, Republic of China
- Commands: (Republic of China (1912–1949)) Chief of Staff, 4th Army, NRA; Chief of Staff, Chinese Red Army (Republic of China (1912–1949)) Chief of Staff, 18th Army Group, NRA; Chief of the General Staff, CMC

Chinese name
- Simplified Chinese: 叶剑英
- Traditional Chinese: 葉劍英
Transcriptions
Standard Mandarin
- Hanyu Pinyin: Yè Jiànyīng
- Wade–Giles: Yeh Chien-ying
- IPA: [jê tɕjɛ̂n.íŋ]
Hakka
- Romanization: Ya̍p Kiam-yîn
Yue: Cantonese
- Jyutping: Yip Gim-ying

Birth name
- Simplified Chinese: 叶宜伟
- Traditional Chinese: 葉宜偉
Transcriptions
Standard Mandarin
- Hanyu Pinyin: Yè Yíwěi
- Wade–Giles: Yeh I-wei
Hakka
- Romanization: Ya̍p Ngì-vî
Yue: Cantonese
- Jyutping: Yip Ji-wai

Courtesy name
- Simplified Chinese: 沧白
- Traditional Chinese: 滄白
Transcriptions
Standard Mandarin
- Hanyu Pinyin: Cāngbái
- Wade–Giles: Ts'ang-pai
Hakka
- Romanization: Chhông-pha̍k
Yue: Cantonese
- Jyutping: Cong-baak

Ye Jianying (simplified Chinese: 叶剑英; traditional Chinese: 葉劍英; Wade-Giles:Yeh Chien-ying; 28 April 1897 – 22 October 1986) was a Chinese Communist revolutionary leader and politician, one of the Ten Marshals of the People's Republic of China. He was the top military leader in the 1976 coup that overthrew the Gang of Four and ended the Cultural Revolution, and was the key supporter of Deng Xiaoping in his power struggle with Hua Guofeng between 1978 and 1981, which ended in Hua fading into political obscurity. In his capacity as Chairman of the Standing Committee of the National People's Congress, Ye served as China's head of state from 1978 until 1983, being succeeded in that capacity by Li Xiannian with the restoration of the post of Chairman of the People's Republic of China by a new constitution.

== Early life ==
Ye Yiwei (Chinese: 叶宜伟) was born into a wealthy Christian Hakka merchant family in Jiaying County (present-day Meixian District, Meizhou), Guangdong. His courtesy name was Cangbai (滄白). Several of Ye Jianying's siblings died in childhood from serious illnesses. In January 1912, Ye graduated at the top of his class from Sanbao Academy and was admitted to Wuben Middle School in Meixian. Later that year, Wuben was merged with three other schools and reorganized as a government-run institution. Dissatisfied with the conservative leadership of its new principal, Ye organized and led more than 100 students in withdrawing from the school, after which they transferred to Dongshan Academy in Meicheng.

Shortly afterwards, progressive intellectuals, local gentry, students' parents and patriotic overseas Chinese established Dongshan Middle School at the foot of Dongshan Hill, where Ye continued his education. During his time there, he was exposed to reformist publications advocating social and political change and served two consecutive terms as president of the student union. In the autumn of 1915, he left the school before graduating and taught for six months at Xinqun Primary School in Hengshan, near Yanyangbao. Later that year, he accompanied his father on a trip to Southeast Asia before returning to China in 1916.

== Military career ==
In the summer of 1917, Ye enrolled at the Yunnan Military Academy. After graduating in January 1920, he joined Sun Yat-sen's revolutionary movement. Later that year, he participated in Sun's campaign against the Old Guangxi Clique, and in October 1921 accompanied Sun on an inspection tour of Guangxi.

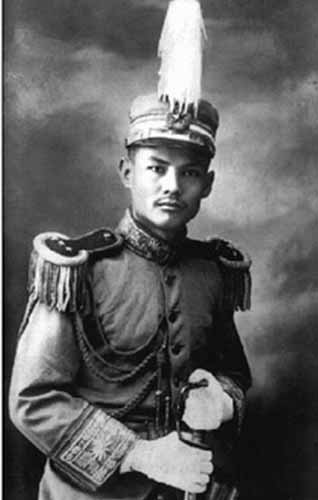
Ye at the Yunnan Military Academy

During Chen Jiongming's rebellion in June 1922, Ye, then serving as a battalion commander in the Naval Landing Corps, led his troops in escorting Sun to safety before fighting against Chen's forces. He subsequently served as chief of staff of the 8th Brigade of the Eastern Route Bandit Suppression Army in Fujian before returning to Guangdong to campaign against Chen. His role in the victory at Yanling Pass established his reputation as a capable military officer.

In early 1924, Ye was appointed chief of staff of the Second Division of the Guangdong Army in recognition of his service against Chen Jiongming. At the invitation of Liao Zhongkai, he joined the preparations for the establishment of the Whampoa Military Academy and, on 5 May 1924, became deputy director of its Faculty Department while also teaching weapons science.

While serving at Whampoa, Ye came into contact with numerous members of the Chinese Communist Party and became increasingly influenced by Marxism–Leninism. In July 1924, at the request of division commander Zhang Minda, he returned to active service and led troops that repelled the forces of Lin Hu during their attack on Guangzhou. On Liao's orders, he subsequently established the Second Division's Independent Battalion at Xiangzhou, serving concurrently as its commander while training recruits according to Whampoa's methods. On 15 October, he and Zhang Minda commanded the Second Division during the suppression of the Canton Merchants' Corps Uprising.

In January 1925, Ye participated in the First Eastern Expedition against Chen Jiongming. He was appointed magistrate of Meixian in March before assuming command of the Second Division's Newly Organized Regiment two months later, leading it during the Second Eastern Expedition. Following the capture of Huizhou, he was left in command of the Huizhou–Boluo area to restore public order. In December, Chiang Kai-shek appointed him commander of the Instructor Corps, one of the Kuomintang's principal military formations. When the corps was later reorganized as the 20th Division, Ye became its deputy commander. During this period, Ye submitted his first application to join the Chinese Communist Party. The party assigned Xiong Rui to meet with him, but no decision was reached. Although many members supported his admission, others argued that, as a senior officer in Chiang Kai-shek's forces, he should remain under observation, and his application was left unresolved.

=== Northern Expedition and Nanchang Uprising ===
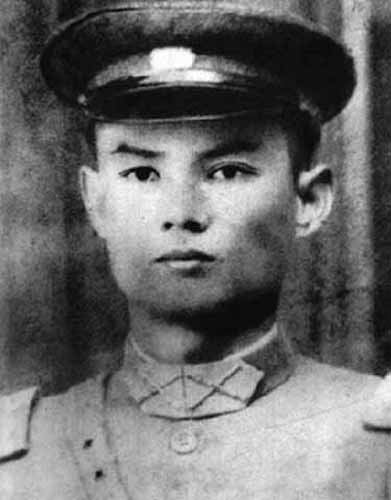
Ye in 1925

In July 1926, Ye took part in the Northern Expedition, initially serving as chief of staff of the General Reserve Command of the First Army of the National Revolutionary Army. He participated in the Nanchang Campaign, after which Chiang Kai-shek offered him command of the First Division, one of the National Revolutionary Army's elite formations. Reluctant to command one of Chiang's principal units, Ye declined the appointment, citing ill health. Instead, he was appointed acting commander of the Second Division of a newly formed army composed largely of troops incorporated from Sun Chuanfang's defeated forces. After assuming command at Ji'an, he assembled a headquarters staffed by former classmates from the Whampoa Military Academy and recruited a number of young officers and students. Following Chiang's purge of Communists and left-wing Kuomintang members in April 1927, Jiangxi entered a period of White Terror. Martial law was imposed in Ji'an, while trade unions, peasant associations, student organizations and newspapers were suppressed. In response, Ye declared his support for the Wuhan Nationalist Government and convened a meeting of his officers, announcing:

"Those who are willing to carry out the revolution and support the Wuhan Government may remain. Those who support Chiang Kai-shek and wish to go to Nanjing may do so freely."

Ye then drafted and transmitted a telegram openly opposing Chiang. According to later accounts, Chiang initially dismissed reports that Ye had defected before eventually accepting them after repeated confirmation. Ye subsequently led a group of left-wing officers from Ji'an to Wuhan, where he was appointed chief of staff of the Fourth Army. Officers who remained behind later launched the Ji'an Uprising. After learning of the uprising, Chiang expelled Ye from the Kuomintang. In July 1927, through the introduction of Li Shi'an and with the approval of Zhou Enlai, Ye secretly joined the Chinese Communist Party. Shortly before the Nanchang Uprising, Ye learned of a plan by Wang Jingwei to arrest or eliminate Ye Ting (no relation) and He Long. He secretly met the two commanders aboard a small boat on Gantang Lake in Jiujiang, warning them of the danger and urging them to move their forces swiftly to Nanchang. After the uprising was defeated and the insurgent forces retreated, Ye persuaded Zhang Fakui not to pursue them, helping facilitate their withdrawal.

=== First-half of the Chinese Civil War ===
Ye with Shen Junru

In early August 1927, Ye was concurrently appointed commander of the Fourth Army Officers' Training Regiment. Although he reportedly opposed the decision to launch the Guangzhou Uprising, he carried out his assigned responsibilities during the operation. After the uprising was suppressed, he escaped to British Hong Kong together with Ye Ting and Nie Rongzhen. Unlike Ye Ting, who was subsequently removed from his positions and later went into exile, Ye was not held responsible for the uprising's failure. He instead went underground in Hong Kong before travelling to the Soviet Union in the winter of 1928 to study in a special military science programme at the Moscow Sun Yat-sen University.

During the Chinese Eastern Railway conflict in 1929, Chinese sources state that Ye, together with Liu Bocheng and other Chinese Communists studying in the Soviet Union, volunteered for service after responding to calls to defend the Soviet Union. According to these accounts, he travelled to Khabarovsk in the Soviet Far East, joined the Far Eastern Workers' Partisan Detachment, helped train its personnel, fought against the forces of Zhang Xueliang and participated in Soviet operations around Hailar in Heilongjiang.

=== Return to China ===
In the second half of 1930, Ye returned to China and arrived in Shanghai, where he worked with Liu Bocheng and other Chinese Communists translating Soviet military publications, including the Red Army Infantry Combat Regulations and the Political Work Regulations. In April 1931, he travelled to the Jiangxi Soviet. As the Nationalist government prepared the Second encirclement campaign against the Jiangxi Soviet, a strategic dispute emerged between Mao Zedong, who advocated drawing Nationalist forces deep into Red Army territory, and Xiang Ying, who favoured a different approach. Ye supported Mao's strategy and assisted in directing the Second and Third Counter-Encirclement Campaigns.

In November 1931, Ye was appointed a member of the Central Revolutionary Military Commission of the Chinese Soviet Republic and chief of the General Staff. Later that month, he proposed the creation of a more streamlined and professional command structure, helping to establish the Red Army's formal staff system. He became president and political commissar of the Red Army School in October 1932 while concurrently serving as garrison commander of Ruijin. During 1933, he held several senior military appointments, including commander of the Red 19th Army, chief of the General Staff of the Red Army, and chief of staff of the First Front Army. In January 1934, he was elected to the Second Central Executive Committee of the Chinese Soviet Republic. Ye joined the Long March in October 1934 as commander and political commissar of the Military Commission's First Column and was wounded during a Nationalist air attack in Guangxi. After the First and Fourth Front Armies linked up in 1935, he became chief of staff of the Forward Command Headquarters. When Zhang Guotao refused to comply with the Central Committee's directive to continue the march north, Ye informed Mao Zedong of Zhang's actions, contributing to the decision for the First Front Army's main force to proceed independently into northern Shaanxi.

After the Red Army reached northern Shaanxi, Ye served concurrently as chief of staff of the First Front Army and the Central Military Commission. During the Eastern Expedition of 1936, he commanded the Central Route Army. Later that year, in the aftermath of the Xi'an Incident, he joined Zhou Enlai and Bo Gu in negotiations with the Northeastern Army. Acting primarily as the Communist delegation's senior military representative, he participated in staff-level talks that helped facilitate cooperation between the Chinese Communist Party and the Kuomintang. On 8 March 1937, Ye and Zhou concluded an agreement with Nationalist representatives that laid the groundwork for reorganizing the Chinese Red Army into the Eighth Route Army and formalized military cooperation against Japan.

=== Second Sino-Japanese War ===
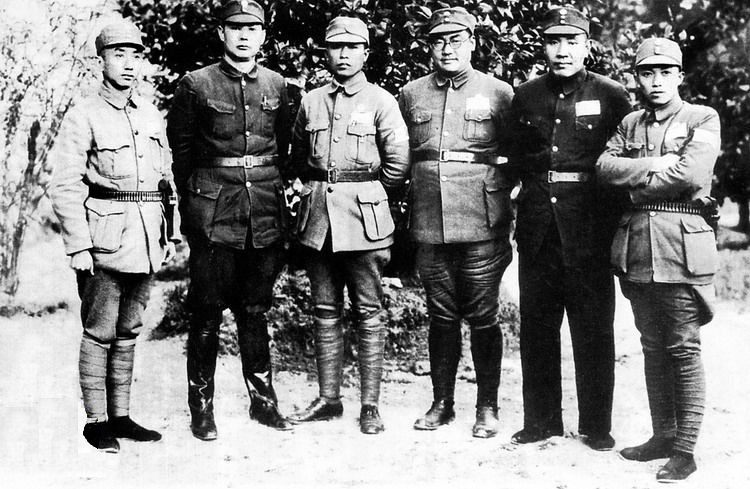
Eighth Route Army instructors at the Nanyue Guerrilla Cadre Training Class, 10 April 1939. From left: Wu Xiru, Ye Jianying, Li Zhenya, Li Tao, Bian Zhangwu and Xue Zizheng

When the Red Army was reorganized as the Eighth Route Army in 1937, Ye became its chief of staff, with the Nationalist rank of lieutenant general. Until 1941 he worked mainly as a CCP liaison with the Nationalist government in Nanjing, Wuhan and Chongqing, as a member of the party's Yangtze River Bureau and later its Southern Bureau. After the New Fourth Army incident in 1941, he returned to Yan'an as chief of staff of the Central Military Commission and the 18th Group Army. In 1944 he briefed foreign journalists and the US Army Observation Group (the Dixie Mission) on CCP military operations, and in 1945 he was elected to the Central Committee at the 7th Party Congress.

=== Post-war ===
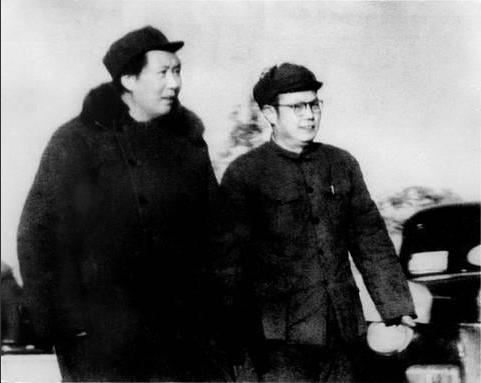
Ye with Mao Zedong at Beijing Xijiao Airport (1949)

After the war Ye took part in ceasefire talks with the Nationalists in Chongqing. In 1946 he was the CCP's representative on the Executive Headquarters in Beijing, which supervised the ceasefire under American mediation. After Nationalist forces captured Yan'an in 1947, he headed the Central Committee's Rear Committee in Shanxi. In 1948 he became president of the North China Military and Political University. In early 1949 he was appointed mayor of Beijing and director of its Military Control Commission. In these posts he oversaw the takeover of the city after the surrender of Fu Zuoyi's garrison in the Pingjin campaign. In April 1949 he was a member of the CCP delegation at peace talks with the Nationalist government.

== People's Republic of China ==
In August 1949, Ye became first secretary of the CCP's South China Sub-bureau and commander of the Guangdong Military Region. With Chen Geng he directed the campaign that captured Guangzhou in October 1949, and he then served as chairman of the Guangdong provincial government and mayor of Guangzhou. In 1952 the leaders of the South China Sub-bureau were criticized for "localism" and for being too lenient in land reform, and Ye made a self-criticism.

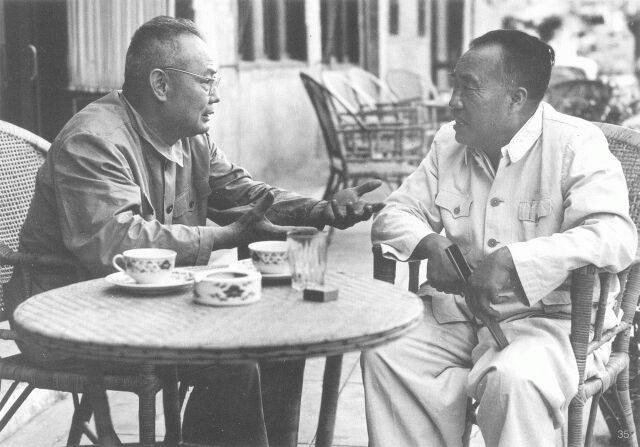
Ye with Zhu De at Zhongnanhai (1955)

After moving to Beijing in 1954, Ye headed the PLA's Armed Forces Inspectorate and then its General Training Department. He was made a Marshal of the People's Republic of China in 1955. In 1958 he became the first president of the Academy of Military Science. He joined the standing committee of the Central Military Commission in 1959 and became one of its vice-chairmen in January 1966. In August 1966 he was elected to the Politburo.

=== Cultural Revolution ===
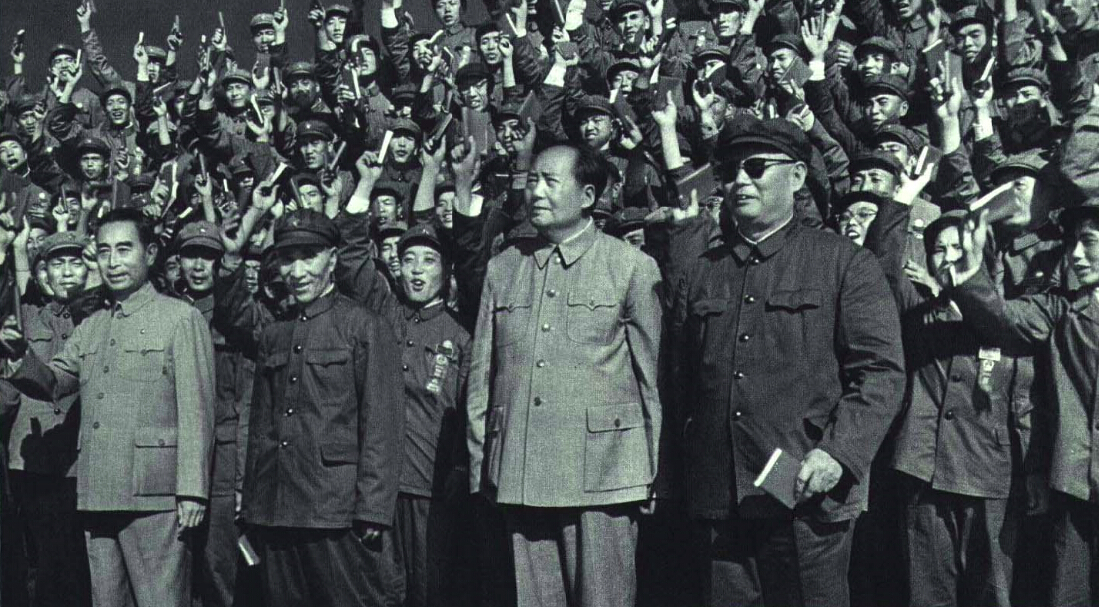
Ye and Mao at the National Day celebrations, 1966

In the early Cultural Revolution, Ye opposed spreading the movement into the armed forces. In January 1967, at a Military Commission meeting at the Jingxi Hotel, he and his fellow marshals Xu Xiangqian and Nie Rongzhen clashed with members of the Central Cultural Revolution Group over the army's role. The marshals then drafted an eight-point order restricting disorder in the army, which Lin Biao supported and Mao approved. In February 1967 Ye and other senior leaders again confronted the Cultural Revolution Group. Mao sided with the group, and the leaders were denounced as the "February Countercurrent".

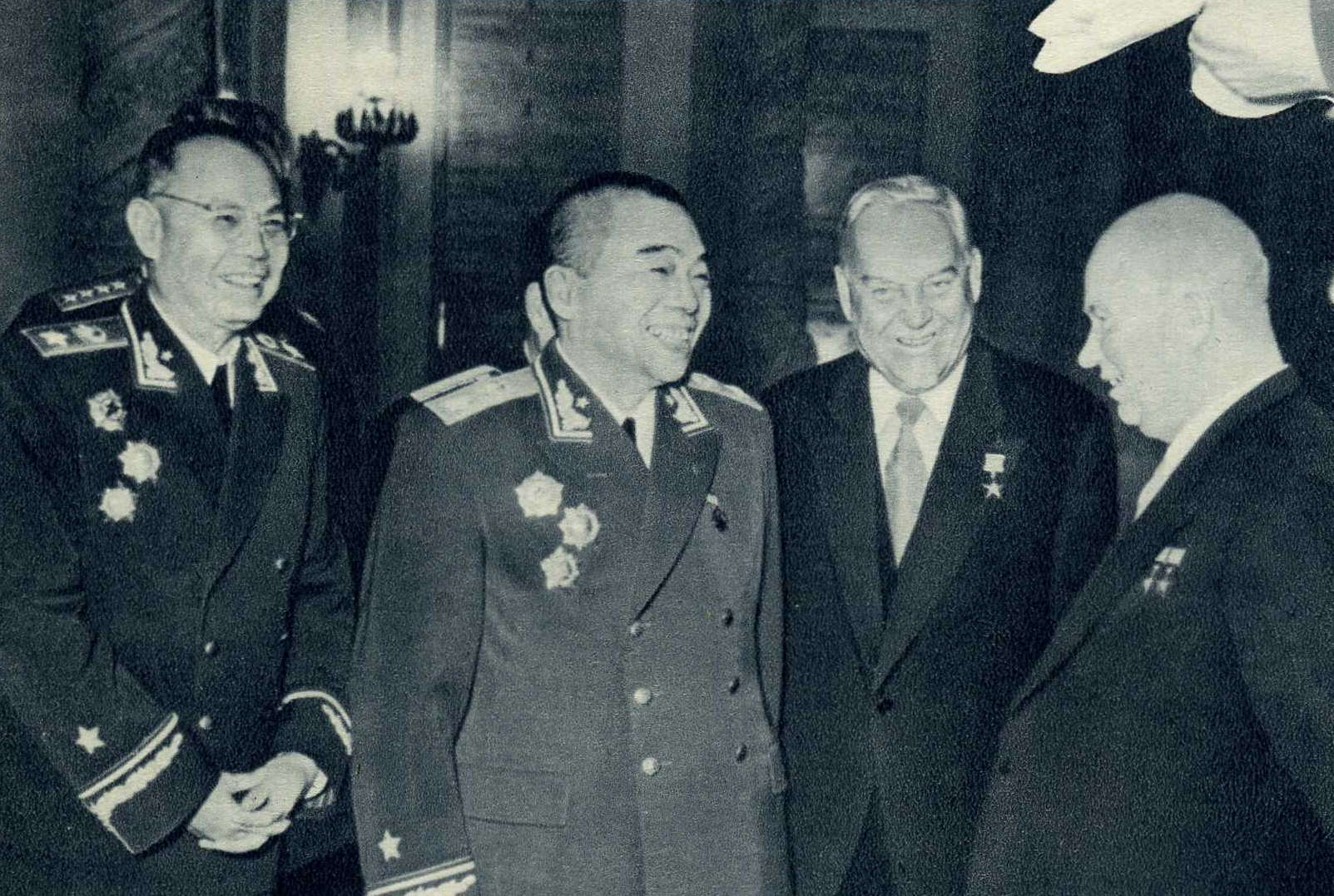
Jianying with Nikolai Bulganin, Nikita Khrushchev and Marshal Peng Dehuai

In 1969 Ye, Chen Yi, Xu and Nie reviewed the international situation for Mao and Zhou. Later that year, under Lin Biao's "Order No. 1", he was sent away from Beijing to Changsha. After Lin's death in September 1971, Ye took charge of the Military Commission's day-to-day work. In 1973, the PLA completed a thorough re-organization. Thereafter, Ye handled the PLA's operations in consultation with Zhou Enlai. In 1975, Ye was appointed Defense Minister, filling Lin Biao's former post. He helped to receive Henry Kissinger in 1971 and Richard Nixon in 1972, and in 1973 he became a vice-chairman of the CCP and a member of the Politburo Standing Committee. In January 1974 he and Deng Xiaoping directed the Battle of the Paracel Islands. He was appointed Minister of National Defence in January 1975, and with Deng he reduced the size of the army and reorganized its leadership. After Deng was removed from office in early 1976, Mao ordered Ye to "rest", and Chen Xilian took over the Military Commission's daily work.

After Mao's death in September 1976, Ye planned the removal of the "Gang of Four" with Premier Hua Guofeng and Wang Dongxing, head of the Central Committee's General Office. They decided to detain the four first and seek the Politburo's approval afterwards. On 6 October Wang Hongwen, Zhang Chunqiao and Yao Wenyuan were arrested at a meeting in Zhongnanhai, and Jiang Qing was arrested at her residence. That night the Politburo met at Ye's residence. Ye declined Hua's proposal that he become party chairman and nominated Hua instead, who was elected chairman.

=== Reform era and death ===
Ye then played a major part in Deng Xiaoping's return to power and urged Hua to restore Deng to office. In March 1978 he was elected Chairman of the Standing Committee of the National People's Congress. Because the office of State President had been abolished, this made him the country's head of state. As Deng's supporters gained ground against the "Two Whatevers" faction, Hua's position weakened, especially after the third plenum of December 1978. At Politburo meetings in late 1980 that reviewed Hua's leadership, Ye criticized himself for having supported Hua uncritically. Hua then offered his resignation, which was accepted in June 1981.

As head of state, Ye presided over the issuing of the "Message to Compatriots in Taiwan" in January 1979. In September 1981 he proposed a nine-point plan for reunification with Taiwan, known as "Ye's Nine Points". Consistent with Deng's one country, two systems approach, Ye elaborated on Chinese unification through his 30 September 1981 "Nine Points Proposal" in which Taiwan would retain a high degree of autonomy following unification. The Nine Points Proposal also talked of trade, transportation, and postal services as "three links" across the strait and "four exchanges" in the areas of culture, academics, economics, and sports. He gave the main speech on the 30th anniversary of the People's Republic in 1979, which reviewed the country's achievements and mistakes since 1949. He also chaired the committee that drafted the 1982 Constitution.

Ye was re-elected to the Politburo Standing Committee and as vice-chairman of the Central Military Commission in 1982, and retired from these posts in September 1985. He died in Beijing on 22 October 1986, aged 89. His ashes were interred at the Guangzhou Uprising Martyrs' Cemetery in 1987.

== Family ==
Ye married several times. His wives included Feng Hua (married 1924), Zeng Xianzhi (1927), Wei Gongzhi (1937), Wu Bo (1940) and Li Gang (1948; divorced 1955). His children include Ye Xuanping, a former Governor of Guangdong; Ye Xuanning, a former head of the liaison department of the PLA General Political Department; Ye Xiangzhen, a film director; and Ye Xuanlian, a businessman. The writer Dai Qing was raised by Ye after her father was killed by the Japanese in 1944.

== Awards ==
Republic of China
Order of Victory of Resistance against Aggression (1946)

China
Order of August 1 (1st Class Medal) (1955)
Order of Independence and Freedom (1st Class Medal) (1955)
Order of Liberation (1st Class Medal) (1955)

Colombia
Order of Democracy (1982)

Government offices
Preceded by Liu Yaozhang	Mayor of Beijing; 1949	Succeeded by Nie Rongzhen
Preceded by Xue Yue as chairman of the ROC Guangdong Provincial Government	Governor of Guangdong; 1949–1953	Succeeded by Tao Zhu
Vacant Title last held by Marshal Lin Biao	Minister of National Defense; 1975–1978	Succeeded by Marshal Xu Xiangqian
Assembly seats
Preceded by Soong Ching-ling as Acting Chairwoman	Chairman of the Standing Committee of the National People's Congress; 1978–1983	Succeeded by Peng Zhen
Preceded by Soong Ching-ling as Acting Chairwoman	Head of State of the People's Republic of China (as Chairman of the NPC Standing Committee); 1978–1983	Succeeded by Li Xiannian as President of China
Party political offices
Preceded by	Secretary of the CPC Guangdong Committee; 1949–1955	Succeeded by Tao Zhu
Vacant Title last held by Lin Biao	Vice Chairman of the Chinese Communist Party; 1973–1982; Served alongside: Zhou Enlai, Hua Guofeng, Deng Xiaoping, Wang Dongxing, Li Desheng, Kang Sheng, Wang Hongwen, Chen Yun, Zhao Ziyang	Post abolished
Military offices
New title	Commander of the PLA Guangdong Military District; 1949–1951	Succeeded by Huang Yiping
New title	Political Commissar of the PLA Guangdong Military District; 1949–1950	Succeeded by Tan Zheng
