= Wang Jianlin =

Chinese businessman (born 1954)

- 王健林
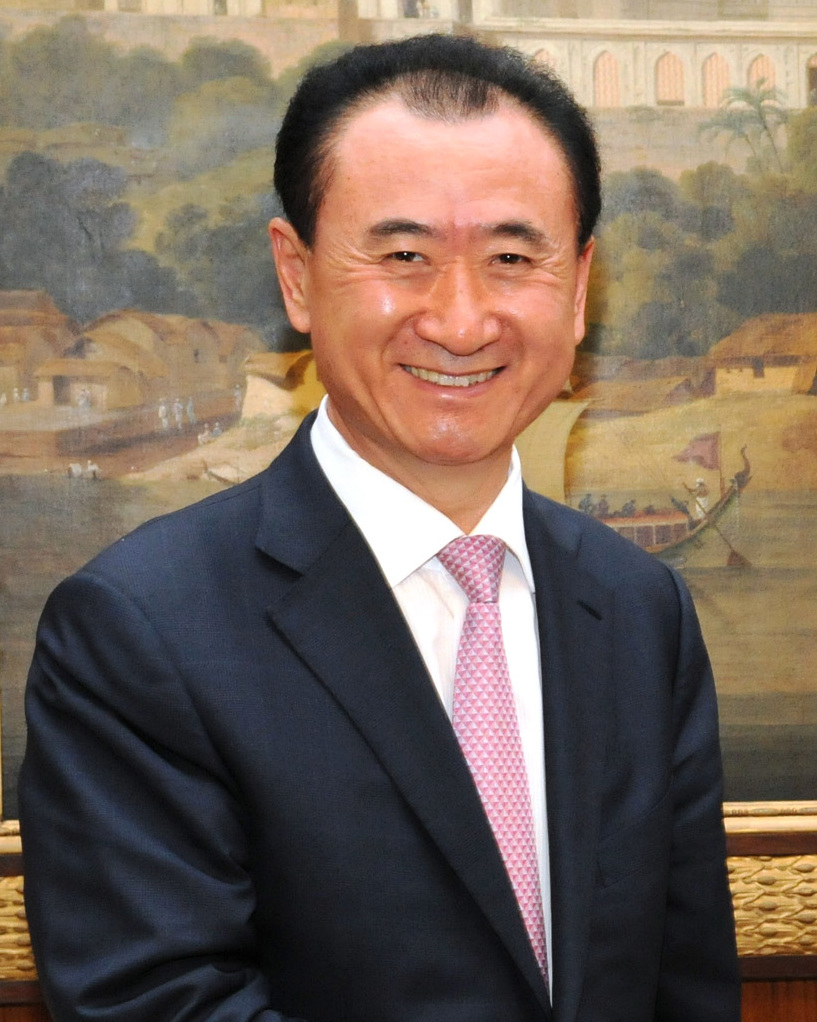
- Wang in 2016
- Born: 24 October 1954 (age 72); Cangxi, Guangyuan, Sichuan, China
- Education: Liaoning University
- Occupations: Businessman, investor, philanthropist
- Organization(s): Founder and chairman, Dalian Wanda Group
- Known for: Wealthiest person in China (2015–2017)
- Political party: Chinese Communist Party
- Spouse: Lin Ning
- Children: Wang Sicong (son)

Wang Jianlin (Chinese: 王健林; pinyin: Wáng Jiànlín; born 24 October 1954) is a Chinese business magnate, investor and philanthropist. He is the chairman, founder, and majority shareholder of the Dalian Wanda Group, one of China's foremost conglomerate companies, which is also well known for being China's largest real estate development company and the world's largest cinema operator. He previously owned 17% of the Spanish football club Atlético Madrid. In 2016, Wang reached a deal with FIFA to launch the China Cup, in which national football teams compete in Nanning, Guangxi each year.

Wang has been the economic consultant for Yunnan province, as well as a construction consultant of the Guiyang government, and was named "honorable citizen" of Changchun, and "outstanding contributor" to the construction of Dalian.

As of November 2026, Wang is estimated by Forbes to have a net worth of US$4.4 billion.

== Early life and career ==
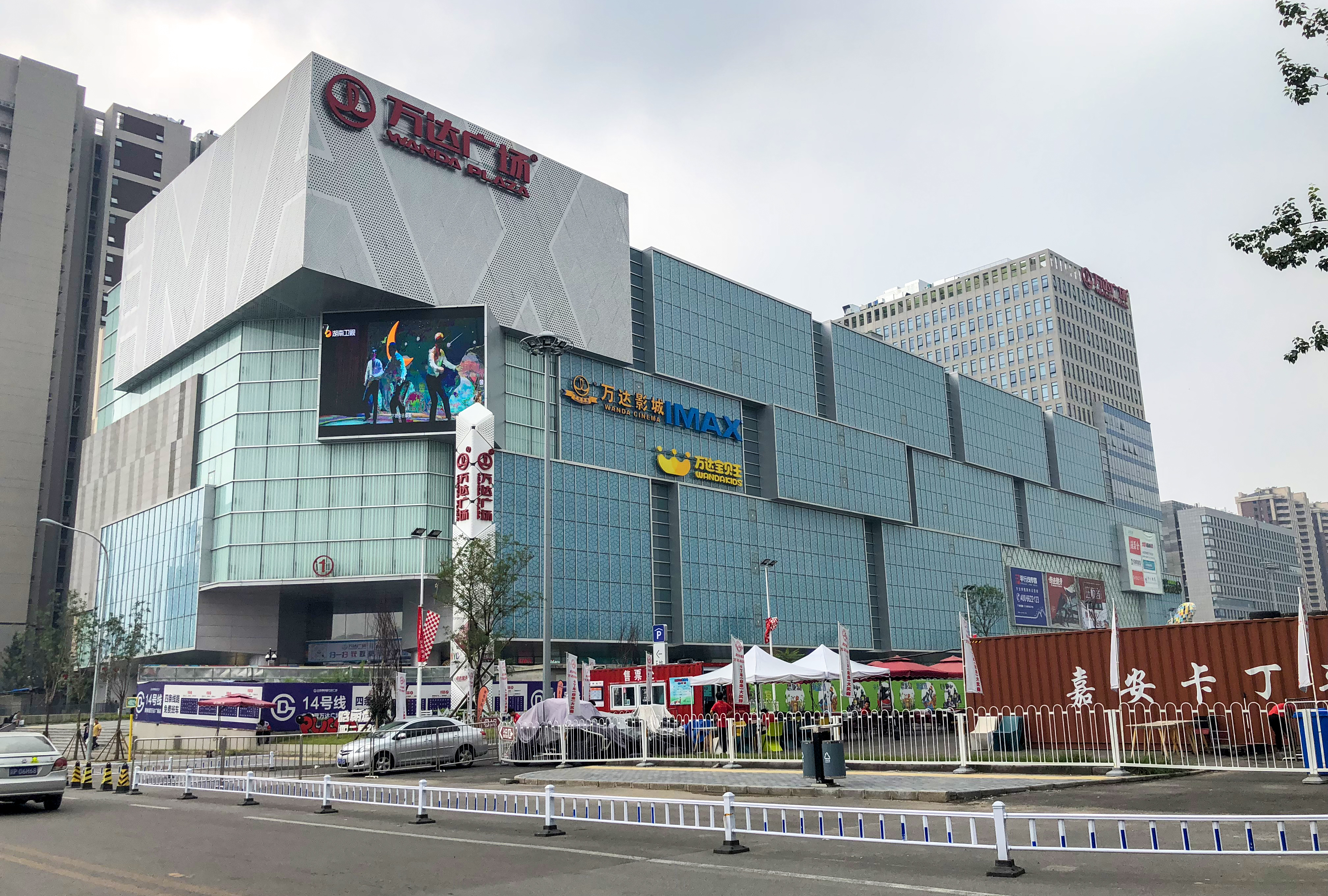
One of the Wanda Plaza in Beijing

Wang Jianlin was born on 24 October 1954, in Cangxi County, Guangyuan, Sichuan, (Note: He was born in the Second People's Hospital of Mianyang Special District, in what is today known as Cangxi) as the oldest of five sons. His father Wang Yiquan was a peasant who fought for Mao Zedong's People's Liberation Army during the Long March (October 1934–October 1935). Retired from the army just before the Korean War, his father, working for the forestry service, and mother Qin Jialin settled in a village in Jinchuan County, Sichuan, where their son would grow up. His given name at birth was originally 建林 which can be translated as 'forest builder'.

Wang became a soldier at age 15, lying about his age, and made his way up in the army ranks quickly, becoming a commander at age 27. During his time in the army, he served in Chengdu, before being sent to the Shenyang Military Region in 1970. After 17 years in the army, in 1986 Wang started working as the office administrator for the Xigang District in the city of Dalian. In 1988, using a $80,000 loan, he took over the small property developer Xigang Residential Development. In 1992, as the company went public as one of the first in a pilot program, he was promoted to general manager and changed the name to Dalian Wanda.

His conglomerate company owns over 21.57 million square metres of commercial real estate across mainland China, consisting of 168 Wanda Shopping Plazas, 82 luxury hotels, 213 cinemas, 99 department stores, and 54 karaoke centers. The company also became the world's largest theatre owner in 2012 when it acquired AMC Theatres. He bought out the American-based AMC Entertainment for US$2.6 billion. He listed it on the New York Stock Exchange in December. He flew in leading Hollywood celebrities Leonardo DiCaprio, Kate Beckinsale, and John Travolta to help launch a US$8 billion mini-Hollywood in the coastal city of Qingdao in January 2014.

Wanda Group acquired the landmark Edificio España building in Madrid, Spain, in March 2014 from Grupo Santander for "about a third less than the €389 million that Banco Santander paid in 2005, at the height of Spain's construction boom". Previously, Dalian Wanda had taken on billion-dollar hotel development projects in London and New York, as well as property projects in India.

In 2014, he acquired land at 9900 Wilshire Boulevard in Beverly Hills, California, US to build the American headquarters named "One Beverly Hills" of his entertainment company.

In January 2015, it was reported that he was buying a 20 per cent stake in the Spanish football club Atlético Madrid for €45m. He sold his stake to Quantum Pacific Group for an undisclosed fee in 2018.

In 2016, Wang launched a direct competition with Disney by declaring that he wants to make sure Shanghai Disneyland Park does not make any money in China by launching over a dozen competing amusement parks. In November 2016 Wang's Dalian Wanda Group announced plans to acquire Dick Clark Productions for about US$1 billion, giving it the broadcasting rights to the Golden Globe Awards, the Academy of Country Music Awards and the New Year countdown celebrations in New York. Wanda already owns Legendary Entertainment, co-producer of films such as Jurassic World and U.S. cinema chain AMC Entertainment Holdings.

The Economist has called Wang "a man of Napoleonic ambition", citing his military background in the PLA, where he rose from border guard to regimental commander. He enforces "iron discipline" in the workplace, where employees are fined when they violate the company's conservative dress code. Despite his age, he has a "trim figure".

== Politics and philanthropy ==
At the age of 15, Wang started his 17-year service with the People's Liberation Army, initially as a border guard before rising to become a regimental commander. In 1976, he joined the Chinese Communist Party. He served as deputy to the 17th National Congress of the Chinese Communist Party.

Wang is a delegate to the Chinese National People's Congress. He was twice named CCTV's "Economic Person of the Year". He is the vice chairman of the All-China Federation of Industry and Commerce, and has been a member of the Chinese People's Political Consultative Conference since 2008.

He is vice chair of the China Charity Confederation; vice chair of the China Folk Chamber of Commerce; vice chair of the China Enterprise Confederation and the China Enterprise Directors Association; vice chair of the China General Chamber of Commerce; vice-chair of the Global Advisory Council of Harvard University.

In 2011, he donated US$197 million to charitable causes, such as underwriting the restoration of an ancient temple in Nanjing. In 2014-2015 he donated US$200,000 for the restoration of the Electric Fountain in Beverly Hills, California, US. In 2017 he donated CNY 20 million to help 2017 Sichuan landslide victims, it was speculated that he empathized especially with the region having grown up in Ngawa Prefecture.

Wang maintains a close relationship with the Chinese Communist Party. The New York Times reported in 2015 that relatives of high-ranking Party officials amassed a stake in the company prior to the IPO of Dalian Wanda which appreciated to over $1.1 billion when the company was listed. These relatives include Qi Qiaoqiao, the sister of General Secretary of the Chinese Communist Party Xi Jinping, as well as the daughter of former Premier of China Wen Jiabao.

However, Wang's personal motto is "stay close to the government and distant from politics." He believes entrepreneurs should be "close" to the government and "clear" from the government as well. "If the government never talk to entrepreneurs, they'll never know what entrepreneurs want to invest, develop or solve."

In 2010, Wang donated a billion yuan (US$156 million) to the city of Nanjing for reconstruction of the Porcelain Tower of Nanjing. This is reported to be the largest single personal donation ever made in China.

== Wealth ==
Wang Jianlin has been ranked prominently in worldwide billionaire lists for years.

The previous year, Forbes ranked him the 128th richest person in the world, with US$8.6 billion. In August 2013, he was listed as the wealthiest person in China with a net worth of US$14.2 billion by Bloomberg. In September 2013, his net worth rose to US$22 billion, according to numbers of the Hurun Report.

In 2015, Bloomberg listed him as the richest person in Asia with US$9.9 billion. According to Forbes, in 2016 he was the richest person in Asia with US$28.7 billion. A year later, Forbes ranked him 18th in its 2017 World's Billionaires list, making him the richest man in China with a net worth of US$31.3 billion. However, on 14 May, Jack Ma overtook Wang Jianlin as the richest man in China, thanks to Ma's Alibaba Group's increases in stock prices.

In 2020, Wang tumbled down the rich list as his real estate empire and movie theatre chains both sharply declined in the wake of the COVID-19 pandemic. Forbes ranked him outside the top 10 in its 2020 list of Richest Chinese Billionaires with an estimated net worth of $14 billion.

As of 30 November 2022, Forbes ranked him 39th in China Rich List and 138th its 2022 World's Billionaires list with an estimated net worth of $7.9 billion.

== Personal life ==
He is married to Lin Ning (Chinese: 林宁; pinyin: Lín Níng), and has a son, Wang Sicong (Chinese: 王思聪; pinyin: Wáng Sīcōng; born 1988), educated at Winchester College and University College London in the UK. As of 2016, Wang Sicong is a board member of the Wanda Group and a venture capitalist in China through his Beijing-based private equity fund, Prometheus Capital (普思投资).

Wang is a follower of Buddhism, although he considers himself not religious. Owing to his years of military service, he lives with military discipline. He is also noted for singing Tibetan and Mongolian folk songs. His hobbies are collecting art and singing karaoke.

In December 2015 Wang bought 15a Kensington Palace Gardens, London, for £80 million. The house was previously lived in by the Ukrainian billionaire, Leonard Blavatnik, who rented it during lengthy works on the house he owns opposite.

In July 2016, Wang released his book, The Wanda Way: The managerial philosophy and values of one of China's largest companies. The book was published globally by LID Publishing. The book includes his 2013 China Central Television Voice interview, his speech and question-and-answer session to the Harvard Business School, and Wang's business philosophy on Wanda's real estate, resort, and movie units.

== Bibliography ==
- The Wanda Way: The managerial philosophy and values of one of China's largest companies (2016) ISBN 978-1910649428
