= History of Tsinghua University =

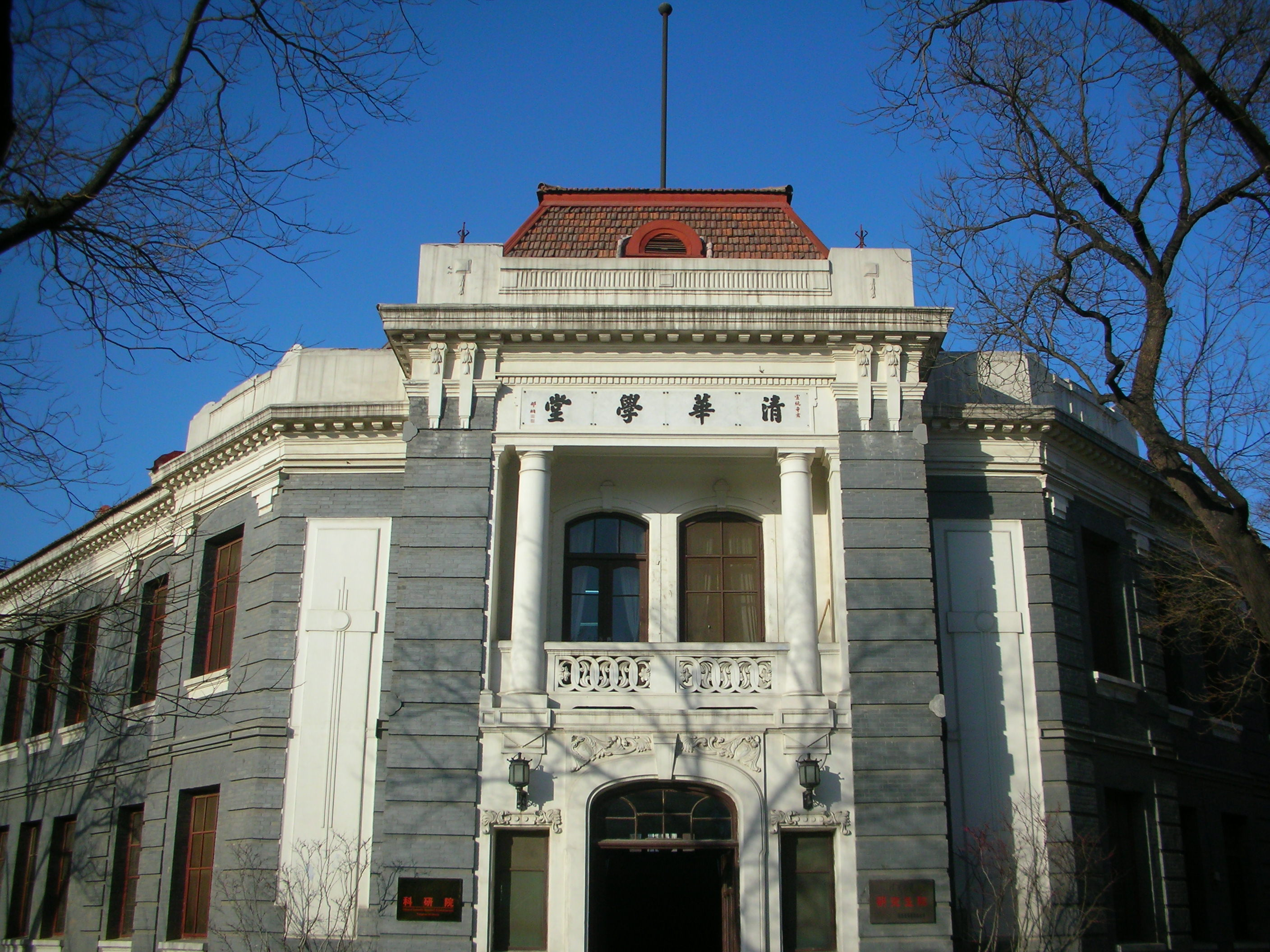
Qinghua Xuetang, the old building of the former Tsinghua College.

Founded in 1911, Tsinghua University is located on the site of Tsinghua Garden in Beijing, the former residence of Prince Yinzhi, the third son of the Kangxi Emperor of the Qing dynasty. National Tsing Hua University, established by the original Chinese faculty of the university after the Chinese Civil War, is located in Hsinchu, Taiwan.

In 1909, the indemnity payment to the United States from the Boxer Protocol was reduced by US$10.8 million by Theodore Roosevelt's administration. The Qing imperial court used the difference to create the Boxer Indemnity Scholarship Programme and established the China Institute along with a preparatory school. The school was later renamed Tsinghua School and expanded in 1925 with the addition of a college department.

== Origins ==
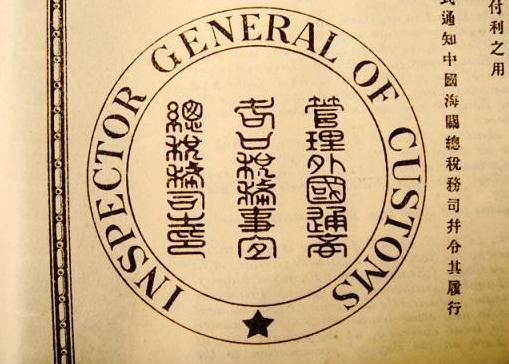
Bond for Boxer Rebellion Indemnity

The history of Tsinghua originated in the Boxer Protocol signed in 1901. The Qing dynasty had to pay war reparations amounting to US$333 million with a four percent annual interest rate in taels of fine silver to the Eight-Nation Alliance, in which the United States had a share of US$24,440,778.81. With difficulties in settling the debt, the Chinese Ministry of Foreign Affairs instructed the Chinese ambassador Liang Cheng to negotiate with United States. On 5 December, Liang had the first meeting with United States Secretary of State John Hay, in which Hay proposed that the reparations exceeded the original demand from the United States, and the reduction of payment was settled. With approval from the United States Congress, President Theodore Roosevelt authorised the further reduction of the reparation down to US$13,655,492.69. The remaining difference was to be returned to China, gradually starting in January 1909 for educational programmes, and to create scholarship programmes for Chinese students to study in the United States. To honour Theodore Roosevelt for his contributions to the founding of Tsinghua University, a gymnasium on the Tsinghua campus was named Roosevelt Memorial Gymnasium.

On 11 July 1908, the document for reduction of reparation was delivered to the Qing imperial court by ambassador William Woodville Rockhill. Prince Qing responded to the United States government as follows:

We appreciate your President's sincerity in encouraging our students to enrol in American schools and seek higher education. In the light of the success that American-style education has brought to our country, the Government of the Great Qing Empire is faithfully committed to annually sending students to be educated in your schools.

Tang Shaoyi was dispatched to the United States to deliver the official letter from the Qing imperial court. The letter says:

We use the year of reduction in reparation as a point of reference. In the previous four years, the Qing Dynasty has sent 100 students (to the United States) annually. At the end of four years, there will be 400 students from our country in the United States. From the fifth year to the year when we finish paying reparations, we will send at least 50 students every year (to the United States).

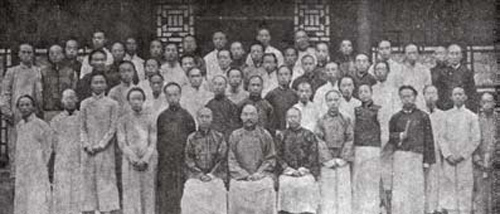
The first batch of Chinese students to study in the United States in 1909

The United States government begin to remit the difference in 1909. In May, Tenney Charles Daniel was assigned to represent the United States government in the study programme. The selection of students was finalised after a series of discussion in June, and the proposal received the imperial approval on 10 July. The office for the study programme was officially set up on 17 July. (Note: It is said that the office was established during June and July, or on the fourth day of the sixth month, but according to Submission to the Ministry of Foreign Affairs from the Office of the Study in the United States of America to Report the Annual Expenses for the First Year of Xuan Tong, it should be "the first day of the sixth month (in Chinese calendar)", that is, July 17, 1909.) On 25 August, Zhou Ziqi (Note: 周自齐在1909年初授外务部右参议，署（“代理”之意）左参议，5月补任左参议，8月署右丞，不久改为署左丞。8月25日，兼任学部丞参上行走并出任游美学务处总办。此时，其职位有四：外务部署左丞、外务部左参议、学部丞参上行走、游美学务处总办，官品为候补三四品京堂。后于1922年代行中华民国北京政府总统。) and Tang Guo'an were appointed to the board of directors to run the office operations. Tsinghua Garden was transferred to the study programme office to establish the preparatory school.

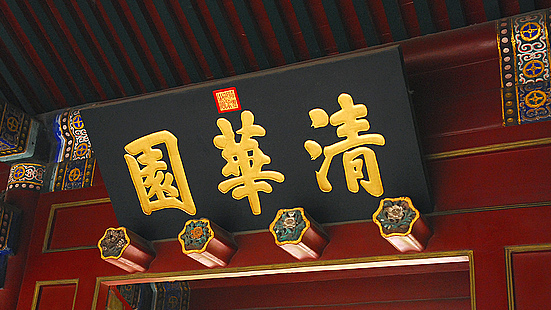
The inscription on the plaque of Tsinghua Garden written by the Xianfeng Emperor.

== Republican era ==
Tsinghua received a charter from the Republic of China (ROC) in 1928 and became a national university. At the onset of Second Sino-Japanese War, Tsinghua, Peking University and Nankai University moved to Changsha and formed the National Changsha Provisional University. The combined school relocated to Kunming in 1938 and was renamed as National Southwest Associated University.

Tsinghua was restored in 1946 at Tsinghua Garden. It became one of the National Key Universities of the People's Republic of China following education policy reforms starting in 1952. National Tsing Hua University at Hsinchu, Taiwan was formed in 1956 by Tsinghua academics who fled the communist revolution.

== Early PRC ==
In 1953, Tsinghua University established a political counselor program, becoming the first university to do so following the Ministry of Education's 1952 directive to begin piloting such programs. As political counselors, new graduates who were also Communist Party members worked as political counselors in managing the student body and student organizations, often simultaneously serving as Communist Youth League secretaries. The program was later expanded to other universities following its endorsement by Deng Xiaoping and became further institutionalized across China in the 1990s and 2000s.

== During the Cultural Revolution ==
During the Third Front construction to develop infrastructure and industry in China's rugged interior in preparation for potential invasion by the Soviet Union or the United States, Tsinghua established a branch in Mianyang, Sichuan province.

=== Early Cultural Revolution ===
The Tsinghua University High School was the cradle for the Cultural Revolution's Red Guard movement. Beginning in the early 1960s, the attached high school's cadres promoted the ideology of class struggle based in familial pride. At the beginning of May 1966, some students, under the influence of the 5-16 Circular, posted a big character poster stating "participate in this class struggle in the most positive and self-aware way", receiving resistance from the school authorities. On the night of May 29, a handful of upper-grade students, after group deliberations at the Old Summer Palace ruins, decided to name their movement the "Red Guards", meaning "Mao Zedong's Red Guards". On June 2, they posted the big character poster "Pledge our lives to defend Mao Zedong thought, pledge our lives to defend the dictatorship of the proletariat" in response to Nie Yuanzi's big-character poster at Peking University, attracting students from surrounding secondary schools to sign their names in support.

Between June 24 and July 27, the Tsinghua University High School posted three big character posters, the ensemble of which was entitled "long live the proletariat class's revolutionary spirit of rebellion!" The first two portions were passed on to Chairman Mao Zedong, who responded with support on August 1. The contents of the big character posters were carried in full by the People's Daily and Red Flag magazine. On 8 occasions, Mao Zedong met the Red Guards in person, pushing the Red Guard movement into the milieu of university students and the general public. The Red Guards began campaigns such as destroying the Four Olds and promoting the "right to link up". On the afternoon of August 24, 1966, the historical secondary gate to the university was pulled down by the Red Guards to symbolize their opposition to feudalism and capitalism and their support for Marxist–Leninist revisionism. On the same site, a giant sculpture of Mao Zedong was raised on May 4, 1967, reported in the People's Daily as a "spectacular event", inciting a wave of construction of similar sculptures across the country.

On June 8, 1966, a task force led by Ye Lin with participation from Chinese President Liu Shaoqi and his wife Wang Guangmei entered Tsinghua University, attacking principal Jiang Nanyu and other cadres as "capitalist roaders", "counterrevolutionary academic authorities", and "cow demons and snake spirits", took over the Tsinghua party committee, and criticized rebellious students. Radical students like Kuai Dafu from the university's engineering chemistry faculty resisted. On June 21, in what has since been called the "June 21st incident", Kuai lambasted the task force, claiming that it did not represent the revolution, and demanded to seize power. The taskforce criticized Kuai, revoked his party credentials, and detained him for 18 days. At least 50 people were condemned for being sympathetic to Kuai; 500 people were implicated, and several attempted suicides occurred, causing two deaths. In July, Mao Zedong returned to Beijing, condemned the task force, supported the radicals, and hinted at disagreements with Liu Shaoqi. In late August, several large-character posters condemning Liu were posted in the Tsinghua Garden. In October, a large-character poster exclaiming "defeat Liu Shaoqi" was posted in the same garden.

On December 19, 1966, under commands from the "proletariat headquarters", the "Tsinghua University Jinggangshan Corps", Tsinghua's largest Red Guard organization with defeating Liu Shaoqi as its purpose, was established. Kuai Dafu became its leader and was nicknamed "commander Kuai".

On December 25, commanded by the Cultural Revolution Group, the Tsinghua University Jinggangshan Corps' 5000 members led a protest against President Liu Shaoqi and Deng Xiaoping, spreading the Cultural Revolution into the entirety of Beijing. On January 6, 1967, Kuai Dafu and others implemented the so-called "strategically seize Wang Guangmei" plan, using the supposed injury of Liu Shaoqi's daughter Liu Pingping as bait to lure wife Wang Guangmei out and detain her. On April 10, with the agreement of the "proletariat headquarters", the "Jinggangshan corps" rallied tens of thousands of people for the public denunciation of Wang Guangmei. More than 300 radical organizations participated in the event.

On April 14, 1967, due to internal disputes over major issues in the Cultural Revolution, the Jinggangshan Red Guards split into the "Corps headquarters" and the "414 faction". The two parties had rather large-scale disputes over the representatives who were to make up the revolutionary committee.

The "headquarters" and "414 faction", on the radical and conservative sides of the Red Guard movement respectively, both declared themselves to be the proper representatives of the proletariat. The two factions had disputes over three core issues: how should the "Cultural Revolution" be understood? How should the first ten years of the Cultural Revolution be seen? How should cadres be treated?

In the winter of 1967, to prevent chaos, the Chinese government demanded that all students return to school to engage in "revolution in the classroom". In March 1968, following the "Yang, Yu, Bo incident", the Cultural Revolution Group launched a campaign against "rightist inclinations". Tensions between the two factions at Tsinghua again began to rise, leading to incessant small-scale clashes.

Between April 23 and July 27, 1968, the opposing Red Guard factions erupted into the "100-day clashes", the most severe clashes to occur during the Cultural Revolution in Beijing. Red Guards used batons, stones, landmines, grenades, improvised guns, improvised cannons, toxic arrows, semiautomatic weapons, Molotov cocktails, and improvised armored vehicles. They occupied and looted the grand auditorium and other important buildings. The clashes caused 18 deaths and more than 1100 injuries, and rendered 30 people disabled for life. Direct economic loses reached at least ten million. At the end of the skirmishes, the "414 faction" was forced to surrender by the "headquarters faction".

On July 27, the Chinese Central Committee, seeking to stop the clashes in higher-education schools, placed the Ministry of Education under military control. On the same day, a 30,000-strong Mao Zedong thought propaganda team led by 61889 Regiment deputy regimental commander Zhang Rongwen entered Tsinghua. The "headquarters faction" Red Guards refused to surrender and publicly resisted the propaganda team, using spears, grenades, and rifles to attack its members. 5 propaganda team members were killed and 731 injured in an incident that astonished the city of Beijing. The "July 27th incident" directly led to Mao Zedong finally ordering the end of public clashes. On 3:00 AM Beijing Time on the following day, Mao Zedong and Lin Biao held an emergency meeting with the "five important leaders" of the Red Guards, including Kuai Dafu, demanding an end to armed clashes and the welcoming of the propaganda team into Tsinghua.

=== Mid-to-Late Cultural Revolution ===
In August 1968, the propaganda team began to "re-educate" the students at the school. Students were sent en masse to countryside farms and factories.

Beginning in the end of 1968, the propaganda team launched the "every man must line up, every level must get down to earth" campaign, leading to numerous suicides or suicidal attempts, causing approximately 16 "irregular deaths". (Note: According to estimates, the irregular death count at Tsinghua during the Cultural Revolution reached 52.)

In 1969, the school constructed a model farm in Nanchang County and sent down 2821 educational staff to engage in labour. In that year, 747 people contracted confirmed cases of schistosomiasis and 1111 people were suspected of having contracted the disease. In the following year, the number of confirmed schistosomiasis patients surpassed one thousand people; the medical department of Tsinghua University had to continue to treat and examine schistosomiasis patients until 1997. One person remarked that "at the model farm, labour was seen as the punishment for academics; only those who completely obeyed the propaganda team were seen as having been completely reeducated. It was pure enslavement."

Beginning in 1970, Tsinghua engaged in an "educational revolution" based on Mao Zedong thought that lasted until the end of the Cultural Revolution. The "educational revolution" consisted of the following facets. Firstly, the working class was to direct all activities; the propaganda team, party committee, and revolutionary committee were to hold power. Secondly, the current faculty was to be reformed while also performing their duties. Thirdly, the school was to engage in industrial activities and faculty and students were to fully commit to industrial production (which, in reality, disrupted education and research). Fourthly, Worker-Peasant-Soldier students were to be enrolled. Fifthly, the old curriculum and educational materials were to be replaced with new proletariat educational material based on educational material from the Soviet Union. Finally, the institution was to follow the path of the people and uphold the Cultural Revolution's new educational method, which, in practice, meant public denunciations.

Between 1970 and 1975, Tsinghua University made large-scale changes to its organization. In 1970, the school planned to put in place three factories, the experimental chemistry factory, automotive factory, and the precise instrument and machine tool factory. The school now had seven majors: electrical engineering, industrial automation, chemical engineering, infrastructure engineering, hydraulic works engineering, engineering physics, and engineering mechanics mathematics. There was a mechanical repair military company and also basic university courses. The school had two "branch campuses": the Mianyang campus and the Jiangxi campus (the model farm at Nanchang). In 1972, a rural campus was established in Daxing and a hydraulics works facility was established in Sanmenxia. The school opened further education courses for industrial workers, professional further studies courses, short-term training courses, part-time courses, and local sites to offer education to worker-peasant-soldier students outside major campuses.

On June 27, 1970, after a four-year-long hiatus in normal admissions, worker-peasant-soldier students began to be admitted. Mao Zedong directed the school to shorten the length of its education to three years. Student recruitment was done through recommendation by the general public, approval by cadres, and examination by the school. After graduation, students were to be returned to their original working units. After October 15, similar schemes were implemented at other institutes of higher education. The last class of worker-peasant-soldier students graduated in 1981.

During the Criticize Lin, Criticize Confucius campaign of 1973 to 1976, critique groups formed at Tsinghua and Peking University disseminated commentaries under the pseudonym of "Liang Xiao". The pseudonym sounds like a person's name but is a homophone for "two schools".

In 1975, Deng Xiaoping's power in the country's government increased. In August and October, vice general secretaries of Tsinghua's party committee Liu Bing, Liu Yi'an and Hui Xianjun as well as political work department director Lu Fangzheng wrote letters passed on through Deng Xiaoping to Mao Zedong expressing their strong dislike of the de facto leaders of Tsinghua, Chi Qun and Xie Jingyi from the propaganda team. Mao saw this as a form of rebellion against the Cultural Revolution and began criticizing Liu Bing and other cadres who wrote the letter and Deng Xiaoping. By mid-November, this became a large debate about the "educational revolution". In December, it evolved into the nationwide Counterattack the Right-Deviationist Reversal-of-Verdicts Trend movement. In this final mass movement of the Cultural Revolution, under the leadership of Chi Qun, Tsinghua University practically ceased its normal educational activities in order to "condemn Deng" and invite cadres and citizens from across the world to "study at" and "visit" Tsinghua. Within a period of ten months, hundreds of thousands of big-character posters were posted and Liu Bing was subjected to criticism and denunciation 214 times.

On March 31, 1976, after the death of Zhou Enlai, Chi Qun demanded that "Tsinghua must not send a single flower wreath to Tiananmen". On April 3, some students sent white flowers to the Monument to the People's Heroes, becoming part of the Tiananmen Incident, known in Chinese as the April 5th movement. On the night of the 6th, Chi Qun referred to the movement as an "organized, purposeful, planned, sequential counterrevolutionary assault". Being defined as such, the movement was subjected to the arrests of "counterrevolutionaries" and the censorship of "counterrevolutionary political rumours". By June 10, more than 100 people had been investigated, 38 had been subjected to school-level isolation, and one person had been arrested.

In October 1976, the Gang of Four was toppled and the Cultural Revolution ended. On October 16, the Communist Party committee in Beijing began efforts to restore the university. The revolutionary committee system was abolished the following year.

== 1990s ==
Tsinghua joined Project 211 and Project 985 that aimed to improve higher education in China.

== 21 Century ==
In November 2010, Tsinghua Xuetang broke out a fire caused by open flames and lodged on the site in breach of regulations, while such a historical building was then under renovation. The accident resulted in no casualties, but the fire gutted the timber roof, floors and staircases of the building's eastern section, an extension completed in the late 1910s. The building was soon afterwards restored before the centenary of the University.

== Sources ==
- 纪希晨 (2001). 史无前例的年代: 一位人民日报老记者的笔记 [Unprecedented times: Notes of a veteran reporter from People's Daily] (in Chinese). 人民日报出版社. ISBN 978-7-80153-370-8.
