= Kuai Dafu =

Chinese revolutionary leader (1945–2025/2026)

- 蒯大富
- Born: 13 September 1945; Jiangsu, China
- Died: 2025 or 2026 (aged 81)
- Occupations: Student, businessman
- Known for: Leading the Red Guards at Tsinghua University
- Political party: Chinese Communist Party
- Movement: Cultural Revolution

Kuai Dafu (Chinese: 蒯大富, 14 September 1945 – 2025 or 2026) was a Chinese revolutionary leader. He was born in Binhai, Jiangsu. A 1967 graduate of the Department of Engineering Chemistry at Tsinghua University, Kuai was one of the five leaders of the Beijing Red Guard rebels during the Cultural Revolution.

== Life and career ==
=== Early life ===
Kuai Dafu was born in Binhai County, Jiangsu on 14 September 1945. His grandfather was a veteran of the New Fourth Army, and both his parents joined the Chinese Communist Party in the 1940s. Kuai attended Binhai Batan Town Middle School. In 1963, he was admitted to the Department of Engineering Chemistry at Tsinghua University.

=== Cultural Revolution ===
In September 1963, Kuai was admitted to the Department of Engineering Chemistry at Tsinghua University. In 1966, after the start of the Cultural Revolution, he began secretly contacting people at Tsinghua University, organizing student gatherings, and discussing current affairs. He posted big-character posters against the department head and university leaders. In June 1966, a work group headed by Ye Lin, then Vice Chairman of the State Planning Commission, entered Tsinghua University and took over the university's Party Committee. The work group criticized students like Kuai for their radical behavior, which sparked student discontent. That same month, the *People's Daily* published an editorial, "Sweep Away All Monsters and Demons," approved by Chen Boda, which listed so-called bourgeois experts, scholars, authorities, and founders as targets for overthrow. On 4 August, Kuai attended and spoke at the Beijing Municipal "Cultural Revolution Activists" conference, becoming a representative of the Tsinghua University Red Guards and a vanguard of the rebellion. He initiated the establishment of the "Jinggangshan Rebel Corps" and served as the deputy commander of the Red Guard Revolutionary Rebel Headquarters of the Capital Universities and Colleges. On December 18, Zhang Chunqiao, then deputy head of the "Central Cultural Revolution" group, met with Kuai alone at the West Gate of Zhongnanhai, listened to his report, and assigned the task of overthrowing Liu Shaoqi and Deng Xiaoping.

=== "Down with Liu Shaoqi" ===
On 25 December, Kuai led more than 5,000 people from Tsinghua University to Tiananmen Square for a march and held a "rally to thoroughly overthrow the bourgeois reactionary line represented by Liu and Deng." After Kuai took the lead in shouting the slogan "Down with Liu Shaoqi," some universities in Beijing followed suit. However, Liu Shaoqi was not overthrown and remained in Zhongnanhai. Kuai devised a plan: he organized Red Guards to surround Zhongnanhai day and night, demanding Liu Shaoqi's removal. After intervention from the Central Committee, the Red Guards surrounding the west gate of Zhongnanhai withdrew.

On 6 January 1967, Kuai lied, claiming that Liu Shaoqi's daughter, Liu Pingping, had lost her leg in a car accident and needed amputation, thus luring Liu Shaoqi and Wang Guangmei to the hospital. Afterwards, the Central Committee sent people to rescue Liu Shaoqi and bring him back to Zhongnanhai, but Wang Guangmei was detained by Kuai and others. Kuai ordered Wang Guangmei to be kidnapped and taken to Tsinghua University, where she was subjected to a public denunciation. She was only able to return home the next day thanks to Zhou Enlai's intervention.

On 29 July 1967, Kuai led a group of people to raid Xu Xiangqian's home for the third time.

=== Organizing Violent Struggle ===
Active from 1966 onwards, Kuai led the Jinggangshan ("Headquarters") faction of the Red Guards at Tsinghua University, where he pursued a degree in chemical engineering. This group wanted to maintain the independence of the Red Guards from the central government. Kuai, alongside Han Aijing and other student leaders, virulently resisted the "work teams" which Liu Shaoqi and Deng Xiaoping had sent to the campuses to restore order and suppress or co-opt the student movement. Liu's wife Wang Guangmei participated in the work teams and personally clashed with Kuai in July 1966. However, Mao subsequently voiced support to Kuai and "made him a vanguard of the Cultural Revolution famous throughout the country."

On 10 April 1967, the Jinggangshan – now supported by the central authorities and the People's Liberation Army – organised an on-campus struggle session where more than 300 alleged "revisionists" (including Wang Guangmei) were publicly humiliated.

Beginning in April 1968, another faction of Red Guards at Tsinghua University rapidly grew in strength, frequently clashing with the "Jinggangshan Rebel Corps" led by Kuai Dafu. From 23 April to 27 July 1968, the "Hundred-Day Armed Struggle" between the two factions of Red Guards at Tsinghua University in Beijing became the largest and longest-lasting armed conflict in the Beijing area. This conflict resulted in 18 deaths, over a thousand injuries, and direct economic losses exceeding 10 million yuan.

On 27 July, Mao Zedong met with the five leaders of the Red Guards and severely warned and criticized them, demanding their withdrawal from the political arena. On the same day, a work team arriving at Tsinghua University was fought off with shots and stones on orders of Kuai, killing five members and injuring many more. The next day, Kuai and other student leaders including Nie Yuanzi were harshly reprimanded for their behaviour by Mao Zedong in the Great Hall of the People. When Kuai complained that a "black hand" was trying to suppress the student movement, Mao mockingly replied that he himself was this "black hand".

According to Roderick MacFarquhar and Michael Schoenhals, the clash between Kuai and Wang Guangmei "was eventually to become part of Red Guard lore and to be immortalized in novels and on the stage, even in the West".

=== Imprisonment and later life ===
In December 1968, Kuai Dafu received a notice that he was assigned to work as an electrolysis worker at the Qingtongxia Aluminium Plant in Ningxia.

In 1970, after falling out of grace with Jiang Qing, Kuai was imprisoned alongside Han Aijing. He was tried and convicted to a seventeen-year prison sentence in 1983. Kuai and Han went on to share a prison cell with activist Wei Jingsheng.

On 19 April 1978, Kuai Dafu was arrested by the Beijing Municipal Public Security Bureau at a university-wide assembly of faculty and students.

On 16 March 1983, the Beijing Intermediate People's Court sentenced Nie Yuanzi, Kuai Dafu, and Han Aijing for their counter-revolutionary activities in following the Lin Biao and Jiang Qing anti-Party clique. He was sentenced to 17 years imprisonment for counter-revolutionary propaganda and incitement, murder, and false accusation, and deprived of their political rights for 4 years. He was subsequently imprisoned in Qincheng Prison in Beijing and Tanggemu Farm in Gonghe County, Qinghai Province. In September 1987, Kuai Dafu was released.

Kuai subsequently pursued a business career. In 1994, he moved to Shenzhen and partnered with a Tsinghua University classmate to run an audio equipment engineering company. However, due to unequal profit sharing, Kuai decided to start his own business.

Similarly to other student leaders from the Cultural Revolution, Kuai was pressured by the post-Mao governments of Jiang Zemin and Hu Jintao to remain discrete about their past as Red Guards and "not to say anything that is 'sensitive'".

=== Death ===
Chinese platforms stated that Kuai Dafu had died on 24 November 2025, at the age of 81, although this was not officially confirmed. His death was later announced on 1 October 2026, without any indication of when he had died.

== See also ==
- History of Tsinghua University
- Red August
