= Qi Jinli =

Chinese politician (born 1959)

- 祁金立

Communist Party Secretary of Kaifeng
- In office May 2011 – December 2014
- Preceded by: Liu Changchun
- Succeeded by: Ji Bingwei

Mayor of Luohe
- In office December 2006 – May 2011
- Preceded by: Jin Kewen
- Succeeded by: Lü Qinghai

Personal details
- Born: September 1959 (age 66) Hua County, Henan, China
- Party: Chinese Communist Party
- Education: Henan Institute of Science and Technology; China University of Political Science and Law; Huazhong University of Science and Technology

Qi Jinli (Chinese: 祁金立; pinyin: Qí Jīnlì; born September 1959) is a former Chinese politician who spent most of his career in Henan province. As of December 2014 he was under investigation by the Central Commission for Discipline Inspection. Previously he served as the Chinese Communist Party Committee Secretary of Kaifeng, Deputy Communist Party Secretary and Vice-Mayor of Luohe, and Deputy Communist Party Secretary of Zhengzhou.

He was a member of the 11th National People's Congress.

== Life and career ==
Qi was born and raised in Hua County, Henan. After Cultural Revolution, he entered Henan Institute of Science and Technology in September 1978, majoring in agriculture, where he graduated in August 1981.

He began his political career in August 1981, and joined the Chinese Communist Party in June 1985.

He served in various posts in the General Office of the Henan Provincial Government before serving as Deputy County-Governor and Deputy Communist Party Secretary of Baofeng County in November 1992. In June 1993 he was promoted to become the Communist Party Secretary, at the same time as holding the post of Director of the County people's Congress Standing Committee between June 1993 to February 1995. From September 1995 to February 1997 he studied at China University of Political Science and Law as a part-time student.

Qi served as the head of the Organization Department of CCP Pingdingshan Municipal Committee from January 2000 to June 2001, and the head of the Organization Department of CCP Zhengzhou Municipal Committee between June 2001 to June 2003.

In June 2003, he was appointed the Deputy Communist Party Secretary of Zhengzhou, capital of Henan province, he remained in that position until December 2006, when he was transferred to Luohe and appointed the Deputy Communist Party Secretary and Vice-Mayor. He was re-elected in April 2007. At the same time, he earned a Ph.D. in economics from Huazhong University of Science and Technology in August 2003.

Qi served as the Communist Party Secretary of Kaifeng since May 2011.

== Downfall ==
On December 31, 2014, the state media reported that he was being investigated by the Central Commission for Discipline Inspection for "serious violations of laws and regulations".

On October 25, 2016, he stood trial for taking bribes at the Intermediate People's Court of Puyang.

On August 30, 2017, he was sentenced to 12 years and 6 months and fined 1 million yuan for taking bribes. All his illegal gains will be confiscated and handed over to the State.

Government offices
Preceded by Jin Kewen	Mayor of Luohe; 2006–2011	Succeeded by Lü Qinghai
Party political offices
Preceded by Liu Changchun	Communist Party Secretary of Kaifeng; 2011–2014	Succeeded by Ji Bingwei
