= 2010 Tsinghua Xuetang fire =

2010 fire at a protected heritage building of Tsinghua University, Beijing

- Native name: 清华学堂火灾
- Date: 13 November 2010
- Time: Shortly after 00:00 – c. 03:15 CST (UTC+8)
- Location: Tsinghua Xuetang, Tsinghua University, Haidian District, Beijing, China
- Type: Structure fire
- Cause: Under renovation; open-flame work and on-site lodging in breach of regulations established; fireworks and arson ruled out
- Outcome: Fines of ¥80,000 and ¥40,000 on the main contractor and a subcontractor
- Deaths: None
- Injuries: None
- Property damage: c. 800 m² burned (official figure); direct economic loss over ¥180,000
- Arrests: 8 (criminal detention)

2010 Tsinghua Xuetang fire
- Traditional Chinese: 清華學堂火災
- Simplified Chinese: 清华学堂火灾
Transcriptions
Standard Mandarin
- Hanyu Pinyin: Qīnghuá xuétáng huǒzāi

In the early hours of 13 November 2010, a fire was broke out in Tsinghua Xuetang (i.e. Tsinghua School), the oldest teaching building of Tsinghua University in Beijing and a constituent of the "Early Buildings of Tsinghua University", a Major Historical and Cultural Site Protected at the National Level. The building had been vacated and was undergoing renovation in preparation for the university's centenary in April 2011. The Beijing fire services received the alarm at 01:01 and committed 308 firefighters and 44 appliances; the fire was extinguished at about 03:15. There were no casualties, but the fire gutted the timber roof, floors and staircases of the building's eastern section, an extension completed in the late 1910s.

The Beijing Municipal Fire Bureau ruled out fireworks and arson, and found that construction workers had used open flames and lodged on the site in breach of regulations, and that site managers had instructed workers to give false statements to investigators. Eight people were placed under criminal detention and the two contractors involved were fined. The Beijing Municipal Administration of Cultural Heritage (BMACH) subsequently found that the university had begun the works without submitting the conservation plan required by the heritage authorities, and that the main contractor held no qualification for the repair of cultural relics. The director of the BMACH, Fanzhi Kong (孔繁峙), described the fire as the most serious damage suffered by a historic building in Beijing in more than a decade. The building was restored before the centenary and on 14 April 2011 became the dedicated teaching venue of the university's Tsinghua Xuetang Talents Program.

== Background ==
=== The building ===
Tsinghua Xuetang was the first major building erected at Tsinghua Garden after the Qing government selected the site for the preparatory school, funded by the remitted Boxer Indemnity, that sent Chinese students to the United States. In November 1910 the school was renamed "Tsinghua Xuetang", a change approved by the Ministry of Education in December; the name board over the main entrance was inscribed by the Grand Councillor Natong in 1911. A two-storey brick-and-timber building in a German-influenced classical style, with grey brick walls, red tiles and steeply pitched roofs, it was built in two phases: the western part in 1909–1911 and the eastern part in 1916 (completed, according to the university, in 1918), giving the whole an L-shaped plan of roughly 4,600 square metres. (Note: Contemporary sources give slightly different figures for the building's total floor area: about 4,560 m² in a China News Service report and about 4,650 m² in the Beijing Evening News. The area covered by the 2010 renovation contract was 4,700 m².)

The building served in the school's early years as classrooms and as a dormitory for senior students. From 1925 it housed the Institute of Chinese Classics, where the "Four Great Tutors" – Wang Guowei, Liang Qichao, Chen Yinke and Zhao Yuanren – taught alongside the archaeologist Li Ji and the literary scholar Wu Mi. In the decades before the fire it housed administrative offices including the Graduate School, the Office of Academic Affairs and the registration centre; as every student registered there at the start of term, the building occupied a particular place in the institutional memory of the university. On 25 June 2001 the State Council listed the "Early Buildings of Tsinghua University", including Tsinghua Xuetang, in the fifth batch of Major Historical and Cultural Sites Protected at the National Level.

=== The 2010 renovation ===
As part of preparations for the centenary, the university began works on the building on 8 August 2010, with Beijing No. 3 Construction Engineering Co., Ltd. (北京市第三建筑工程有限公司) as main contractor. According to President Gu Binglin, the works were intended as protective structural and seismic strengthening of a building that, after nearly a century of use, posed serious safety concerns; at the time of the fire they had reached the stage of reinforcing load-bearing walls and waterproofing parts of the roof. Waterproofing had been subcontracted to Henan Hengchang Waterproofing and Anti-corrosion Co., Ltd.

The administrative status of the works later became central to the case. According to the BMACH, the university had applied for approval of the project on 6 May 2010; the State Administration of Cultural Heritage (SACH) and the BMACH approved the project in principle on 18 June and 5 July respectively, on condition that a detailed conservation plan be prepared and submitted to the BMACH for approval. No such plan had been submitted when construction began in August.

== Fire ==
The Beijing 119 command centre received the alarm at 01:01 on 13 November and dispatched nine fire companies with 44 appliances and 308 personnel. The alarm was raised by night staff of the university: according to the university, a duty officer of the School of Journalism and Communication, housed next to the site, and a member of staff working late in the Department of Thermal Engineering were the first to report it. Site staff and security guards told reporters that the first flames were seen in the middle of the second floor of the building's southern range, and that a strong wind drove the fire eastward through the timber roof and floors. (Note: Early accounts differ on the point of origin. A security guard quoted by the Beijing Evening News on 13 November placed the first outbreak at the north-eastern side of the building, whereas site staff and guards quoted by The Beijing News the following day placed it in the middle of the second floor of the southern range, near an electrical room.) Firefighters used aerial appliances to prevent the fire spreading and then sent teams into the interior; according to the director of the fire command centre, the fire was brought under control within about forty minutes, though scattered residual fires took longer to extinguish. The fire was declared out at about 03:15. (Note: The Beijing Evening News, relying on early social-media reports, initially gave 03:45 as the time the fire was put out. The Fire Bureau's figure of about 03:15 was repeated in later reporting. The Fire Bureau later established that the fire had started shortly after midnight, not at 01:00 as first reported.)

The university's initial notice, issued the same morning, stated that about 800 square metres had burned, that there were no casualties, and that the main structure had not been affected. Reporters who visited the site that day found that, although the exterior masonry showed little sign of fire, the roof of the entire eastern half of the building had been destroyed, leaving only charred beams; the second-floor boards and the staircases had burned away, and the burned section was reduced to its standing walls. The same reporters recorded that a university official inspecting the site had put the burned area at about 3,000 square metres, a figure at odds with the official 800. The university subsequently stressed that the fire had been confined to the second-phase construction: the original western range, including the south-western corner tower bearing the Natong name board, did not burn, while the wings of the south-eastern corner tower suffered the heaviest damage. The BMACH's investigation likewise found that the fire had been confined to the part of the building dating from 1916.

== Investigation ==
=== Cause ===
In the days after the fire, several explanations circulated on campus, notably that fireworks or sky lanterns released by students celebrating the informal "Boys' Day" on 12 November had ignited the building. Site and university staff also speculated about an electrical fault or about sawdust used as infill between the double floorboards. At a press briefing on 19 November, the Beijing Municipal Fire Bureau announced that, following site examination, interviews and reconstruction experiments carried out together with criminal investigators, it had ruled out fireworks and deliberate fire-setting.

The head of the Bureau's fire investigation division, Wen Jun (文俊), said that the investigation had been impeded by the absence of independent witnesses and surveillance footage, and by site personnel who initially claimed that work had stopped at about 17:00, that no open flame had been used and that no one was lodging on site. Investigators established instead that six workers had continued working until about 22:00, had used open flames, and had been sleeping on the site in breach of regulations. The direct economic loss was assessed at just over ¥180,000.

The Bureau reported violations in the waterproofing works. One manager of the construction company, one technician and six workers were placed under criminal detention, the site manager having instructed workers to give false testimony. The Bureau fined Beijing No. 3 Construction Engineering ¥80,000 and the waterproofing subcontractor a combined ¥40,000. It also stated that Tsinghua University bore responsibility for failing to supervise the works and would be penalised under the Fire Protection Law. Asked about parallels with the 2010 Shanghai fire two days later, in which multi-layered subcontracting was at issue, the Bureau stated that the subcontracting arrangements on the Tsinghua site – the main contract had been divided among five subcontractors – did not appear to be irregular. The press briefings did not publicly identify a precise ignition source.

=== Heritage-regulatory findings ===
The BMACH opened its own investigation through its cultural-relics enforcement team. On 24 November it announced that the university had not submitted the required conservation plan before starting work in August, and that the main contractor had no heritage-repair qualification and had not engaged a qualified partner. Both points, the BMACH stated, constituted suspected violations of the Cultural Relics Protection Law. An expert panel's preliminary assessment was that the building had suffered serious damage. A BMACH official stated that the authority had learned the works were under way only when the fire occurred.

In an interview with The Beijing News, Kong Fanzhi said that no representative of the university had attended a municipal heritage fire-safety meeting convened five days before the fire, and suggested that some centrally administered institutions responsible for protected sites did not take safety seriously enough. He indicated that the applicable fines under the Cultural Relics Law ranged from ¥50,000 to ¥500,000 and that the penalty would be settled after reporting to the SACH. On 27 November Gu Binglin responded that the works had begun as structural strengthening, for which the contractor was qualified; the need for fuller repair had emerged in the course of the works, and the fire occurred before a plan for this had been submitted for approval.

== Responses ==
=== University ===
On the morning of 13 November the university convened an emergency meeting and ordered fire-safety inspections of all units and of other building and renovation sites on campus. Addressing the university's staff congress on 18 November, Gu Binglin apologised on behalf of the university leadership to staff, students and alumni, described the building as a repository of the memory and traditions of the Tsinghua community, and undertook to cooperate with the investigation and to hold those responsible to account.

=== Heritage specialists and commentators ===
The damage assessment itself was contested. Han Yang (韩扬), director of the Beijing Institute of Ancient Architecture, argued that the roof is an integral part of a building's main structure, so that its loss implied serious structural damage despite the university's assurances; he considered the building technically repairable, but held that its historical value would inevitably be diminished. On 27 November a group of heritage specialists led by Luo Zhewen, head of the SACH's expert group on historic architecture, inspected the site to discuss restoration. Luo stressed that the principle of "not altering the original state" is not satisfied merely by replacing lost fabric with new material, that such work requires specialist craftsmen, and that the restoration should not be rushed to meet the centenary; he also considered winter an unsuitable season for such work.

Editorial commentary treated the fire as symptomatic of wider failings. A commentary in the Beijing Times noted that the municipal heritage authority had convened a meeting on winter fire prevention at renovation sites only five days earlier, and argued that directives and drills unaccompanied by effective supervision amounted to formalism. Writing in Science Times (《科学时报》), Li Chen argued that historic university buildings matter less as functional space than as embodiments of an institution's intellectual heritage. The weekly Legal Weekend (《法治周末》) placed the fire in the context of a series of fires at Chinese heritage sites and cited expert analyses attributing a large majority of historic-building fires since the 1950s to human factors.

=== Public ===
News of the fire spread first on Sina Weibo in the early hours of 13 November, and students and alumni in China and abroad followed events online through the night. Over the following day, students, retired faculty and alumni gathered at the cordoned-off site; the historian Li Xueqin described the building to reporters as a symbol of the university's history. Posts lamenting the fire quickly topped the university's online forum. The fire was also reported by overseas media, including Radio Free Asia.

== Restoration and aftermath ==
Immediately after the fire the BMACH issued an emergency notice to all protected sites in Beijing on fire prevention, with particular reference to renovation sites. It carried out a comprehensive inspection of the early Tsinghua buildings, and sent three inspection teams to examine safety hazards at all nationally protected sites within the municipality, with the director personally leading joint inspections with the fire authorities at the sites judged most at risk.

The university announced that the fire would not delay completion. The restoration was finished in time for the centenary: on 14 April 2011 the university held the launch ceremony of the Tsinghua Xuetang Talents Program (清华学堂人才培养计划), an honours programme in the basic sciences, in front of the restored building, which became the programme's dedicated teaching venue. In September 2016 the Early Buildings of Tsinghua University, including Tsinghua Xuetang, were included in the first list of 20th-century architectural heritage published by the Chinese Society of Cultural Relics and the Architectural Society of China.

== Significance ==
The fire drew attention to the tension between the use and the conservation of historic buildings still in active institutional service. The contemporary record shows three distinct lines of accountability: a fire-safety investigation that established regulatory breaches on site and assigned supervisory responsibility to the university; a heritage-regulatory investigation that found the works had proceeded without an approved conservation plan or a qualified contractor; and professional criticism of the pace and method of restoration. The episode also illustrates how a single figure – an official burned area of 800 square metres and a direct economic loss of about ¥180,000 – could coexist with the heritage authority's judgement that the loss was the gravest to a historic building in Beijing in over a decade.

== See also ==
- 2010 Shanghai fire
- List of fires in China
