= Liu Zhongde (translator) =

Liu Zhongde (Chinese: 刘重德; 1914–2008) was a Chinese translator and professor of English language and Western literature.

== Early life ==
He was born in rural Hua County, Henan province, China. In 1934, he enrolled in Peking University, majoring in English Language and Western Literature. After graduation, he taught at the First Provincial High School at Kunming, Yunnan (1938-1940), National Central University at Chongqing and at Nanking (1944-1946), National Kaifeng University (1946~1947), National Hengshan Normal College (1947-1949), Hunan University (1949-1958), and Hunan Normal University (1958-1988).

== World War II ==
From 1940 to 1944, during World War II, Liu served in China's central government as chief director of Chongqing Warehouse, the biggest distribution system of U.S. aid supplies in China. He served as senior inspector of Sino-Myanmar Highway Project and director-general of Organization Division, Central Organization Department of KMT (the Chinese Nationalist Party).

During his tenure as the chief director of Chongqing Warehouse, the warehouse suffered a bombardment by Japanese Air Forces. While working as a senior inspector in the Sino-Myanmar Highway Project, Liu contracted malaria. Presumed dead, the medic wrapped his body in a sheet of rush mat and left him in the wilderness. A low-ranking crew member found and tended to him for three days until he regained consciousness.

While working in the Kuomintang's Central Organization Department, whenever conducting inspection in military units, he wore the uniform of a Major-General of the National Army. He needed a close working relationship with the administrative staff of the United States or the United Kingdom in each specific program.

== Post-war ==
When the Chinese Communist Party (CCP) overthrew the Nationalist government in 1949, the CPC security division identified him as a "suspect of American-and-Chiang Kai-shek spy".

In the Cultural Revolution he was detained in a labor camp by the Public Order Division (POD) under the Revolutionary Committee of Hunan Normal College (now Hunan Normal University) for a year from 1967 to 1968 and then exiled to Pingjiang Farm, the college's labor camp in Pingjiang county, Hunan.

In the early 1970s Liu was recalled from the farm by the government of Hunan province and positioned as the chief translator training supervisor in Yueyang Fertilizer Plant Construction Headquarters at Yueyang, Hunan province to support the expert teams from the United States, Germany and Japan.

Liu was successful in academic research as a well-known professor. His books Study on "as" and Study on Shakespeare were collected by the British Library in the 1970s, and Ten Lectures on Translation was chosen as the textbook for graduates by Peking University and Tsinghua University since the late 1990s.
