= Dazhai (disambiguation) =

Dazhai or Tachai (大寨) is a village in Shanxi made famous in the "Learn from Dazhai in agriculture" campaign.

It may also refer to the following places in mainland China:

== Towns (大寨镇) ==
- Dazhai, Qiaojia County, in Qiaojia County, Yunnan
- Dazhai, Yun County, Yunnan, in Yun County, Yunnan

== Townships (大寨乡) ==
- Dazhai Township, Hua County, Henan
- Dazhai Township, Ziyun County, in Ziyun Miao and Buyei Autonomous County, Guizhou
- Dazhai Township, Tianquan County, in Tianquan County, Sichuan
- Dazhai Township, Jinping Miao, Yao, and Dai Autonomous County, in Jinping Miao, Yao, and Dai Autonomous County, Yunnan
- Dazhai Township, Qiaojia County, in Qiaojia County, Yunnan
