= Luo Zhewen =

Chinese scholar (1924–2012)

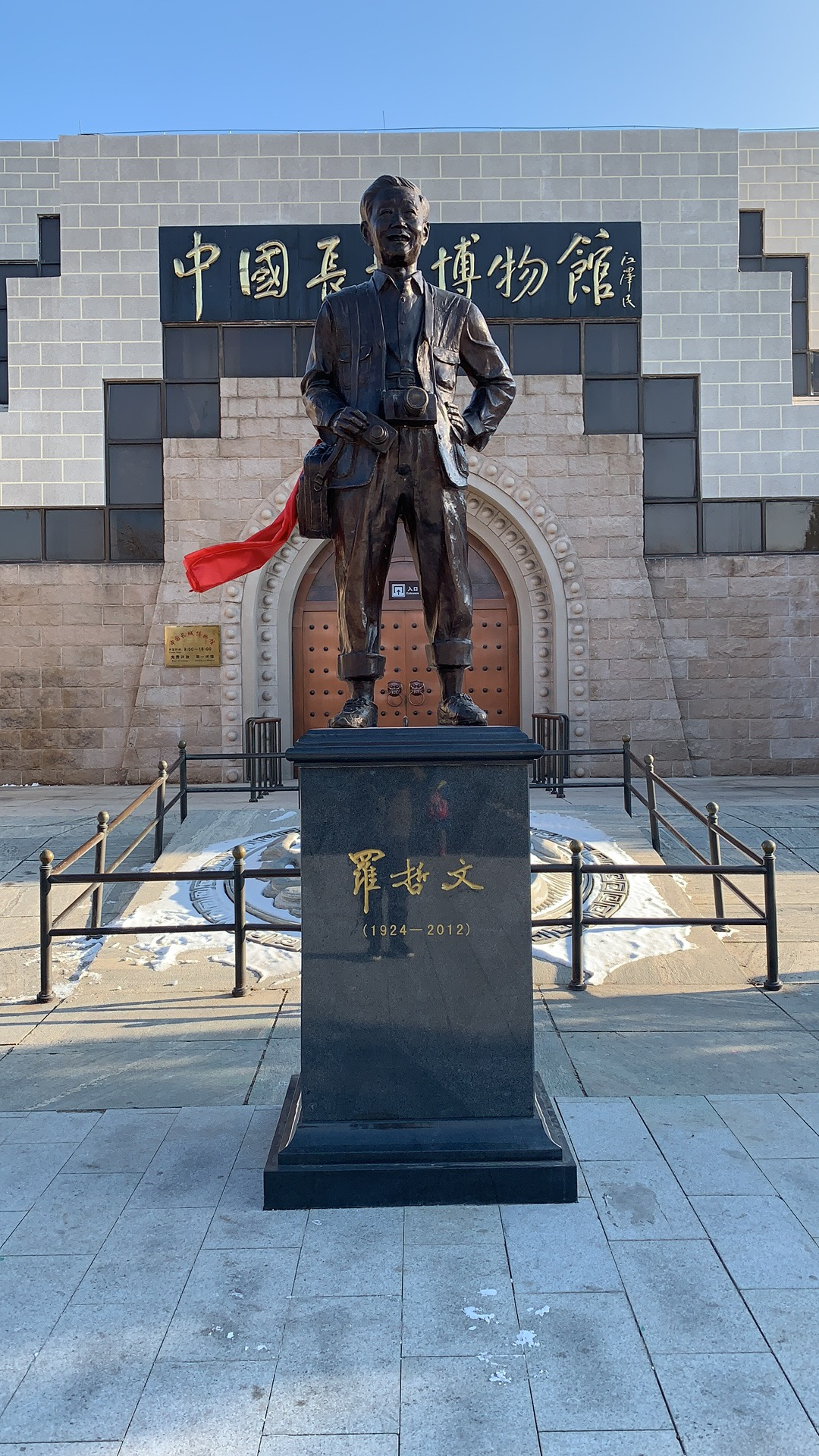
- Stone statue of Luo Zhewen in front of the Great Wall Museum of China
- Born: June 15, 1924; Republic of China
- Died: May 14, 2012 (aged 87); China

Luo Zhewen (June 15, 1924 - May 14, 2012) was a Chinese architect, conservationist, and Great Wall scholar, He was leading a group of heritage experts at the National Bureau of Cultural Affairs.

== Biography ==
In 1940, he was admitted to the Architectural Society of China and studied under Liang Sicheng, Liu Dunzhen and others. In 1946, he went to Beijing with the Architectural Society of China and worked as an assistant to Liang Sicheng (then the director of the Department of Architecture at Tsinghua University) and at the China Architecture Research Institute jointly established by Tsinghua University and the Architectural Society of China. In 1950, he worked in the Cultural Relics Bureau of the Ministry of Culture (later changed to the State Administration of Cultural Relics) as the business secretary of Zheng Zhenduo, the director of the Cultural Relics Bureau. In 1952, he began to work on the restoration of the Great Wall and created the "Great Wall Studies". Later, he served as the director of the Cultural Relics Archives and Data Research Office, the director of the Chinese Cultural Relics Research Institute, and the head of the Ancient Architecture Expert Group of the State Administration of Cultural Relics. In his later years, he also devoted himself to promoting the application of the Grand Canal for World Heritage.

He died of illness in Beijing at 23:52 on May 14, 2012, becoming the last member of the Architectural Society of China to pass away. He was buried in Badaling Cemetery on September 17, 2012.

== Social part-time job ==
He served as honorary president of the Chinese Cultural Relics Society, vice chairman of the National Expert Committee for the Protection of Historic and Cultural Cities, vice chairman of the China Great Wall Society, and member of the Sixth, Seventh, and Eighth National Committee of the Chinese People's Political Consultative Conference .

== Literary works ==
His major works include Ancient Chinese Pagodas, A Brief History of Ancient Chinese Architecture, The Great Wall, A History of the Great Wall, and Chinese Imperial Tombs.
