= Dazhai Township, Henan =

Township of Hua County, Henan, China

Dazhai Township 大寨乡
- Township
- Interactive map of Dazhai Township
- Coordinates: 35°29′48″N 114°55′12″E
- Country: China
- Province: Henan
- County: Hua County
- Time zone: UTC+8 (China Standard)
- Postal code: 456467

Dazhai Township (simplified Chinese: 大寨乡; traditional Chinese: 大寨鄉; pinyin: Dàzhài Xiāng) is a township of Hua County, in the northeast of Henan province, China.
