= Li Xueqin =

Li Xueqin may refer to:

- Li Xueqin (historian) (1933-2019), Chinese historian and archaeologist
- Li Xueqin (comedian) (born 1995), Chinese stand-up comedian and actor
- Li Xueqin (skier) (born 1975), Chinese alpine skier.
