= Nie Yuanzi =

Peking University Red Guard leader

- Born: 5 April 1921; Hua County, Henan
- Died: 28 August 2019 (aged 98); Peking University Third Hospital, Beijing
- Education: Renmin University
- Occupations: Academic administrator, high-level leader of the Red Guards
- Political party: Chinese Communist Party

Chinese name
- Simplified Chinese: 聂元梓
- Traditional Chinese: 聶元梓
Transcriptions
Standard Mandarin
- Hanyu Pinyin: Niè Yuánzǐ
- Gwoyeu Romatzyh: Nieh Yuantzyy
- Wade–Giles: Nieh^{4} Yüan^{2}-tzu^{3}
- IPA: [njê ɥɛ̌n.tsì]

Nie Yuanzi (5 April 1921 – 28 August 2019) was a Chinese academic administrator at Peking University, known for writing a big-character poster criticising the university for being controlled by the bourgeoisie, which is considered to have been the opening shot of the Cultural Revolution. She became a top leader of the Red Guards in Beijing, and was sentenced to 17 years in prison after the end of the Cultural Revolution.

== Early life ==
Nie was born in 1921 into a wealthy family in Hua County, Henan, the youngest of four siblings. Her eldest brother, Nie Zhen (聂真), was a founder of the Chinese Communist Party (CCP) cell in the county. He was married to Wang Qian, a senior CCP member and the ex-wife of then President Liu Shaoqi.

When the Second Sino-Japanese War broke out in July 1937, Nie, then sixteen years old, joined the Communist resistance in Shanxi, which was supported by warlord Yan Xishan. She received military training at the National Teachers' College in Taiyuan and joined the CCP in 1938. In the 1940s, Nie moved to the Communist base in Yan'an, where she met Kang Sheng and his wife Cao Yi'ou.

After the surrender of Japan, Nie was sent to the formerly Japanese-occupied Northeast China in 1946, where she worked in the government of Qiqihar. A year later, she was appointed Director of the Theory Section of the Propaganda Department of Harbin. In 1959, she divorced her first husband Wu Hongyi (吴宏毅), with whom she had two children, after he was denounced as a "rightist" during the Anti-Rightist Campaign.

In 1963, Nie was transferred to Peking University, a turning point of her life. She served as Vice Chair of the Department of Economics and was appointed CCP Committee Secretary of the Department of Philosophy a year later. In early 1966, she married Wu Gaizhi, an official in the powerful Central Commission for Discipline Inspection and a peer of the radical leader Kang Sheng. Many thought that she married him to further her own career.

== Cultural Revolution ==
People gathering to read Nie Yuanzi's 1967 poster condemning Deng Xiaoping

On 25 May 1966, Nie was the lead signatory on a big-character poster on the campus of Peking University. The poster criticised Song Shuo, deputy director of the Beijing Municipal University Bureau, Lu Ping, the President of Peking University and head of its CCP committee, and Peng Peiyun, an official in the Beijing Municipal University Bureau. Although Nie's main criticism was over the control of Peking University by the bourgeoisie, the aim of the campaign was to legitimise the purge of the Beijing municipal party chief Peng Zhen, by exposing his alleged crime of supporting a bourgeoise reactionary education line. This was pushed by members of the radical left-lean clique surrounding Mao Zedong, including Kang Sheng and his wife Cao Yi'ou.The text of the big character poster was as follows:

"To hold meetings and to post big-character posters are mass militant methods of the best kind. But you 'lead' the masses by preventing them from holding meetings and putting up posters. You have manufactured various taboos and regulations. By so doing, have you not suppressed, forbidden, and opposed the mass revolution? We absolutely will not allow you to do so!

You shout about 'strengthening the leadership and standing fast at one's post.' You still want to 'stand fast' at your 'posts' in order to sabotage the Cultural Revolution. We warn you that a mantis cannot stop the wheels of a cart, and mayflies cannot topple a giant tree. You are daydreaming!

Now is the time for all revolutionary intellectuals to go into battle! Let us unite and hold high the great red banner of Mao Zedong's thought [. . .] resolutely, thoroughly, totally, and completely wipe out all monsters and demons and all counterrevolutionary revisionists of the Khrushchev type, and carry the socialist revolution through to the end."

A week later, Mao Zedong ordered the poster to be read on the Central People's Broadcasting Station and published in the People's Daily, accompanied by official commentaries. Two months later, Mao declared her poster as the "first Chinese Marxist-Leninist big-character poster". Mao's approval encouraged attacks on authorities and inspired students at other universities to write posters, most of which expressed support for the "revolutionary action" of Nie.

Nie initially supported the persecution of other academics, but later disagreed on the course the Cultural Revolution was taking and tried to quit her position in the Red Guards. She controlled revolutionary activities at Peking University, along with her colleagues, protected by her status as a celebrated rebel. She became widely known as one of the top five leaders of Red Guards in the capital.

Nie was made an alternate member of the 9th Central Committee of the Chinese Communist Party. In December 1969, she was sent to labour at Peking University's farm in Liyuzhou (鲤鱼洲), Jiangxi. She returned to Beijing in 1970 to recuperate from an illness.

In 1971, Nie was subjected to examination and her movements were restricted. In 1973, she was sent to work in the Xinhua Printing House, where she lived, ate and slept in the factory. She moved to a factory that made apparatuses for Peking University in 1975.

== Imprisonment and later life ==
After the end of the Cultural Revolution, Nie was sent to Yanqing Prison on 19 April 1978. In 1983, she was convicted of multiple crimes including counterrevolutionary activities and defamation. She was sentenced to 17 years in prison, with apparently Deng Xiaoping insisting on a severe sentence. Nie was paroled in October 1986.

In 1998, Ji Xianlin published his memoir Cowshed: Memories of the Chinese Cultural Revolution, recounting his persecution during the period. Nie had condemned Ji during the Cultural Revolution as a "hidden counterrevolutionary". In the book, Ji strongly condemned Nie Yuanzi for her capriciousness, cruelty and arrogance.

Nie was critical of the post-Mao Chinese government and expressed a desire for greater freedom of opinion. In 2005, her memoirs were published in Hong Kong.

Nie died on 28 August 2019, aged 98.

== Bibliography ==
- Nie Yuanzi (2005). 聶元梓回憶錄 [Memoirs of Nie Yuanzi]. Hong Kong: Shidai Guoji Chubanshe. ISBN 978-98-89760-86-1.
