= Hua County =

Hua County 滑县
- County
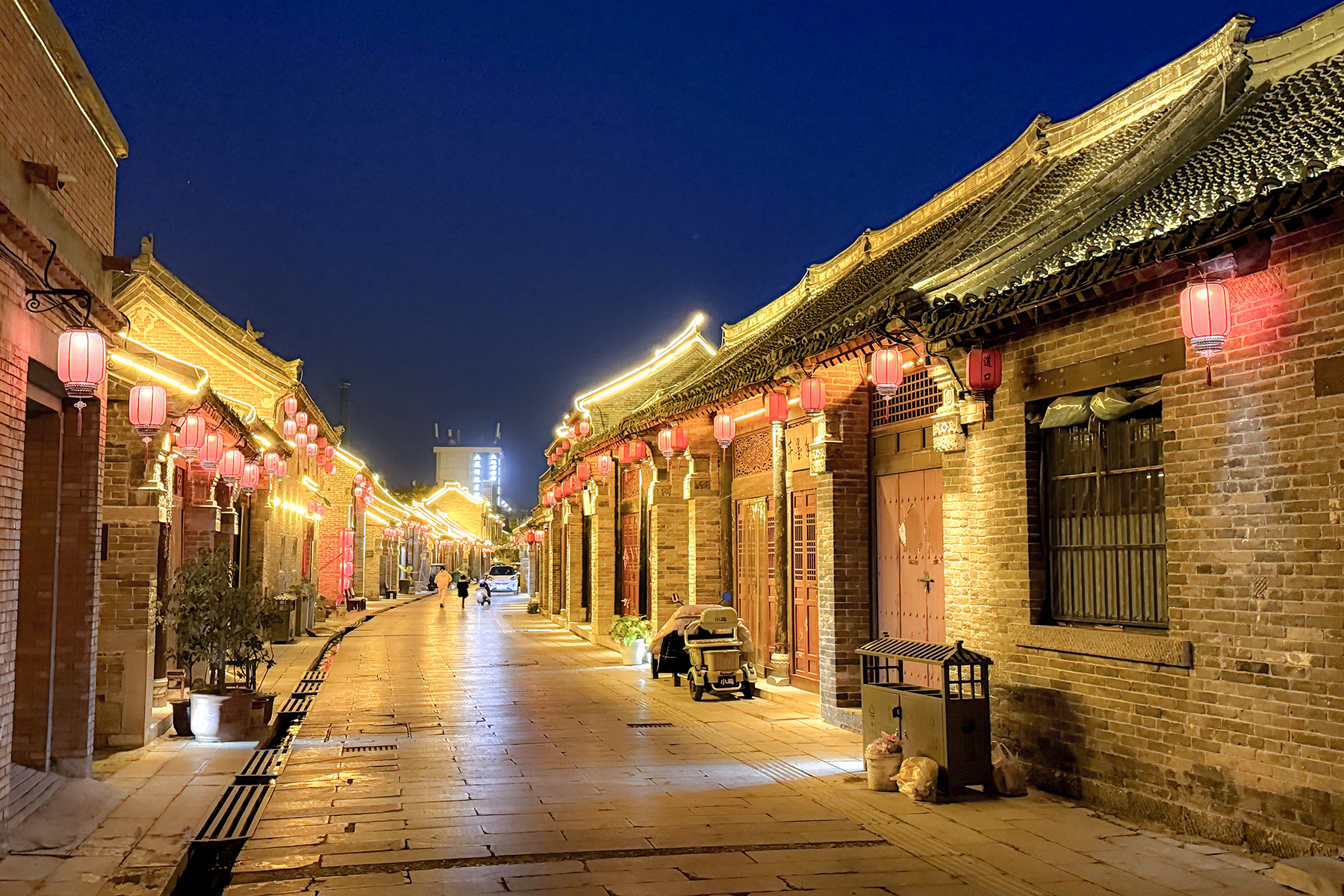

- Location of the seat in Henan
- Country: People's Republic of China
- Province: Henan
- Prefecture-level city: Anyang

Area
  - Total: 1,784 km^{2} (689 sq mi)

Population (2019)
  - Total: 1,078,000
  - Density: 604.3/km^{2} (1,565/sq mi)
- Time zone: UTC+8 (China Standard)
- Postal code: 456400
- Website: www.hnhx.gov.cn

Hua County or Huaxian (simplified Chinese: 滑县; traditional Chinese: 滑縣; pinyin: Huá Xiàn) is a county under the administration of Anyang City, in the north of Henan province, China.

Its predecessor administrative area Huazhou/Hua prefecture was first established in 596 during the Sui dynasty. In 606 it was named Yanzhou (兖州), and soon after as Dong commandery. In 618 it was combined with present Changyuan and Yanjin as Huazhou again. In 1372 it was demoted to a county. The name 'Hua' means 'slip', given because the city had many slipways.

== Location ==
Hua County is located in the southmost part of Anyang. To its north lies Neihuang County, also in Anyang; to its east Puyang County in Puyang; to its south the counties of Changyuan and Fengqiu, both in Xinxiang; to its west Xinxiang's Yanjin County and Hebi's Xun County.

== Administration ==
The county executive, legislature, and Basic People's Court are in Daokou, together with the CPC and PSB branches. Prior to 1949 the administrative center of Hua County was in Chengguan. Its current administrative subdivisions are:

=== 3 subdistricts ===
- Daokou Subdistrict (道口街道)
- Chengguan Subdistrict (城关街道)
- Jinhe Subdistrict (锦和街道)

=== 8 towns ===
- Baidaokou (白道口镇)
- Wangu (万古镇)
- Niutun (牛屯镇)
- Shangguan (上官镇)
- Wangzhuang (王庄镇)
- Liugu (留固镇)
- Gaoping (高平镇)
- Laodian (老店镇) - is upgraded from township

=== 12 townships ===
- Xiaopu Township (小铺乡)
- Banpodian Township (半坡店乡)
- Laoyemiao Township (老爷庙乡)
- Sijianfang Township (四间房乡)
- Sangcun Township (桑村乡)
- Cizhouzhai Township (慈周寨乡)
- Dazhai Township (大寨乡)
- Baliying Township (八里营乡)
- Zhaoying Township (赵营乡)
- Zaocun Township (枣村乡)
- Jiaohu Township (焦虎乡)
- Wagangzhai Township (瓦岗寨乡)

== Climate ==
Climate data for Huaxian, elevation 62 m (203 ft), (1991–2020 normals, extremes 1981–2010)
Month	Jan	Feb	Mar	Apr	May	Jun	Jul	Aug	Sep	Oct	Nov	Dec	Year
Record high °C (°F)	18.2 (64.8)	25.3 (77.5)	27.3 (81.1)	32.1 (89.8)	37.8 (100.0)	40.9 (105.6)	41.0 (105.8)	37.5 (99.5)	37.9 (100.2)	34.5 (94.1)	27.5 (81.5)	23.0 (73.4)	41.0 (105.8)
Mean daily maximum °C (°F)	4.6 (40.3)	8.6 (47.5)	15.6 (60.1)	21.5 (70.7)	27.1 (80.8)	32.6 (90.7)	32.1 (89.8)	30.6 (87.1)	27.0 (80.6)	21.8 (71.2)	13.5 (56.3)	6.6 (43.9)	20.1 (68.3)
Daily mean °C (°F)	−0.9 (30.4)	2.7 (36.9)	9.4 (48.9)	15.3 (59.5)	21.1 (70.0)	26.3 (79.3)	27.2 (81.0)	25.8 (78.4)	21.2 (70.2)	15.6 (60.1)	7.8 (46.0)	1.1 (34.0)	14.4 (57.9)
Mean daily minimum °C (°F)	−4.9 (23.2)	−1.7 (28.9)	4.0 (39.2)	9.7 (49.5)	15.5 (59.9)	20.6 (69.1)	23.3 (73.9)	22.1 (71.8)	16.9 (62.4)	10.9 (51.6)	3.4 (38.1)	−3.1 (26.4)	9.7 (49.5)
Record low °C (°F)	−16.4 (2.5)	−15.7 (3.7)	−7.6 (18.3)	0.0 (32.0)	6.4 (43.5)	11.2 (52.2)	17.3 (63.1)	13.0 (55.4)	7.1 (44.8)	−2.1 (28.2)	−13.0 (8.6)	−14.5 (5.9)	−16.4 (2.5)
Average precipitation mm (inches)	6.1 (0.24)	9.0 (0.35)	14.7 (0.58)	34.9 (1.37)	52.3 (2.06)	74.0 (2.91)	160.6 (6.32)	114.1 (4.49)	68.3 (2.69)	30.5 (1.20)	22.8 (0.90)	5.6 (0.22)	592.9 (23.33)
Average precipitation days (≥ 0.1 mm)	2.6	3.4	3.9	5.3	6.6	7.8	11.3	9.5	7.4	6.0	4.9	2.7	71.4
Average snowy days	3.3	2.7	1.1	0.2	0	0	0	0	0	0	1.2	2.5	11
Average relative humidity (%)	64	61	60	65	67	63	78	81	76	69	69	66	68
Mean monthly sunshine hours	111.0	129.8	177.0	202.5	221.0	199.3	171.3	174.8	153.8	148.2	125.8	120.5	1,935
Percentage possible sunshine	36	42	47	51	51	46	39	42	42	43	41	40	43
Source: China Meteorological Administration

== In the news ==
On 10 September 2009, the Basic People's Court sentenced Wei Fazhao to death for his January drunk-driving killing of eight people and injuring of three. It was the first death penalty given to a drunk driver anywhere in Henan.

== Notable people ==
- Zhai Rang, peasant rebel leader founding Wagang Army during late Sui dynasty.
- Zhao Ziyang, former general secretary of Chinese Communist Party (CPC) and premier of China.
- Lu Huaishen, official of the Tang and Wuzhou dynasties.
- Li Wencheng (李文成), leader of Heavenly Principle Sect revolt in 1813
- Nie Yuanzi, leader of the Red Guards during the Cultural Revolution.
- Wu Lanying, national sport shooter of China.

== Transport ==
- Huaxun railway station
