= Wang Guangmei =

Chinese politician (1921–2006)

- 王光美
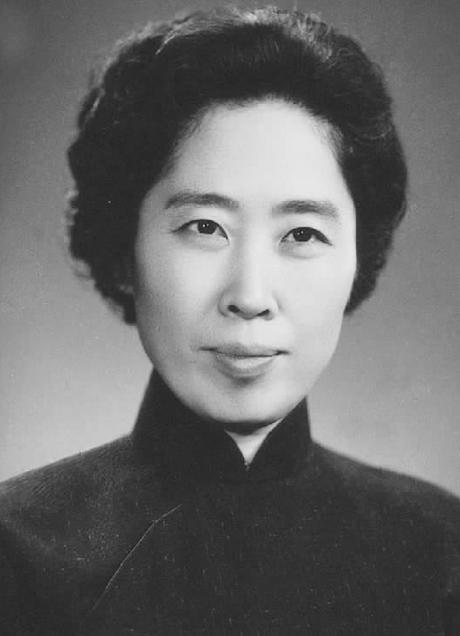
- Wang in the 1950s

Spouse of the Chairman of China
- In office 27 April 1959 – 21 October 1968
- President: Liu Shaoqi
- Preceded by: Jiang Qing
- Succeeded by: Lin Jiamei

Personal details
- Born: 26 September 1921 Beijing, Republic of China
- Died: 13 October 2006 (aged 85) Beijing, China
- Spouse: Liu Shaoqi (m. 1948; died 1969)
- Children: Four including Liu Yuan
- Relatives: Wang Guangying (brother)
- Education: Fu Jen Catholic University (Beijing)

Wang Guangmei' (Chinese: 王光美; pinyin: Wáng Guāngměi; Wade–Giles: Wang Kuang-mei, 26 September 1921 – 13 October 2006) was a Chinese physicist, interpreter, politician and philanthropist. As the wife of Liu Shaoqi, she was China's first lady from 1959 to 1968. She led the "Peach Garden Experience" during the Socialist Education Movement, and during the Cultural Revolution, she was publicly humiliated and imprisoned for twelve years. In later life, she founded the poverty-relief program Project Happiness.

== Early life and education ==
Wang was born in Beijing in 1921. Her father, Wang Zhichang (also known as Wang Huaiqing), had graduated from the Commerce Department of Waseda University in Japan and taught at Tianjin Women's Normal College. During the Beiyang period, he headed the Bureau of Industry and Commerce in the Ministry of Agriculture and Commerce and served as acting minister of agriculture and commerce, although sources vary on the posts he held. Her mother, Dong Jieru, came from a wealthy Tianjin family and had also graduated from Tianjin Women's Normal College. Lee and her co-editors describe Wang as one of ten siblings, six of whom joined the Communist Party, while Global People counts eleven children in the family.

Wang attended an American mission school and became fluent in English, French and Russian. She studied physics at Fu Jen Catholic University, specializing in optics and cosmic rays, and earned a master's degree there. Reuters dates the degree to 1945, while the South China Morning Post gives 1943. According to Elizabeth Perry, she was offered places in doctoral programs at Stanford University and the University of Chicago. Jung Chang and Jon Halliday write that she was about to take up an offer from the University of Michigan.

== Interpreter and marriage ==
In early 1946, Wang became an English interpreter for the Communist delegation at the Executive Headquarters in Beiping, which oversaw George Marshall's mediation between the Nationalists and the Communists. She gained the admiration of many Americans during this work, which later fed charges that she was an American spy. Later in 1946, she went to Yan'an, where she worked as a translator in the Central Committee's foreign affairs department and then took part in land reform in the Jin–Sui liberated area. In 1948, she moved with the Central Military Commission to Xibaipo in Hebei and worked as an editor and translator on Neibu cankao, a restricted digest of foreign news. That year, she joined the Communist Party, and on 21 August 1948, she married Liu Shaoqi, who was 23 years her senior.

== First lady ==
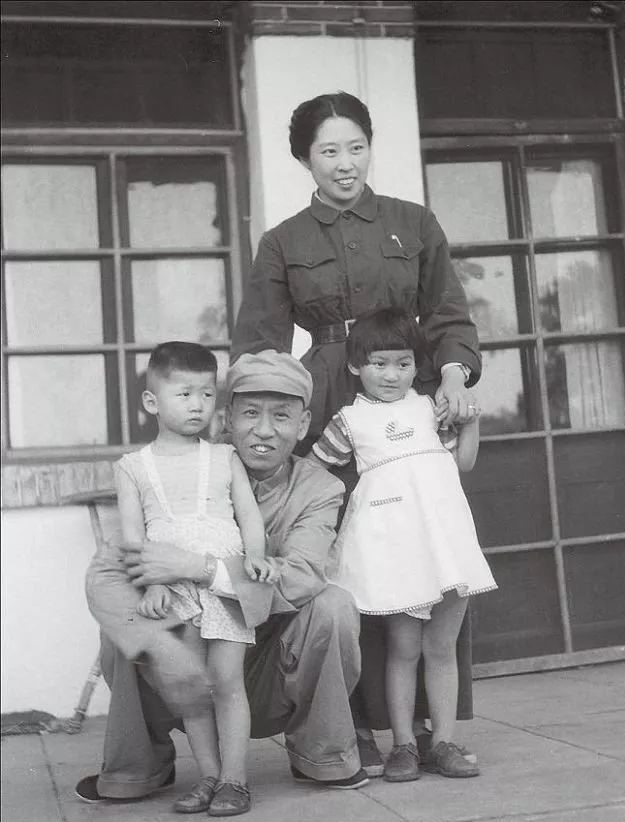
Wang with Liu Shaoqi and their children (1948)

After 1949, Wang worked as Liu's private secretary in the General Office of the Central Committee, a role she held for about eighteen years. She was elected to the executive committee of the All-China Women's Federation in 1957 and served as a deputy to the 3rd National People's Congress. After Liu became head of state in 1959, she accompanied him on state visits to Afghanistan, Pakistan, Burma and Indonesia. She became widely known as China's first lady, and the pearl necklace she wore abroad reportedly angered Mao's wife, Jiang Qing.

With Liu, Wang led the Socialist Education Movement from 1963. That year, she joined a work team at the Peach Garden (Taoyuan) Brigade in Funing County, Hebei, to carry out the "Four Cleanups" campaign against cadre corruption. Her report on the "Peach Garden Experience" described the all-out mass mobilization used against local cadres. Mao praised it, and it became an official party document that served as a model for similar campaigns across the country. The methods it promoted, including public criticism sessions, created a climate of fear and suspicion. The report also treated "superstitious activities" as a sign that their practitioners were seeking political power, a view that shaped the movement's approach to superstition.

== Cultural Revolution ==
In January 1965, Mao expressed dissatisfaction with the Four Cleanups work teams, and Liu, who oversaw the campaign, and his wife began to bear the consequences. In mid-1966, as Red Guards rose to prominence at the start of the Cultural Revolution, Wang headed a work team sent to restore order among the students at Tsinghua University, but she came under attack from a militant student who accused her of being a counter-revolutionary. The Central Case Examination Group set up a special team to investigate her family and educational background.

On 6 January 1967, Red Guards lured Wang to a hospital with a false report that her daughter Liu Pingping had been injured in a traffic accident, then took her to Tsinghua for interrogation. She deflected their accusations at first, but by spring, she faced a far more severe struggle session, which Perry says was attended by half a million people. On 10 April 1967, at Jiang Qing's instigation, Red Guards forced her to wear the tight-fitting qipao she had worn at a banquet in Indonesia, with silk stockings, high heels and a mocking necklace of ping-pong balls, as proof of her bourgeois attitude. She was accused of being a spy for American intelligence, and Jiang Qing called her "Sukarno's whore" for wearing a pearl necklace and evening gown to meet the Indonesian president.

Wang was imprisoned in Qincheng Prison, where she spent twelve years in solitary confinement under harsh conditions. According to The Paper, she was taken there on 27 November 1967 and given the prisoner number 67130. Liu died in custody in 1969, but she learned of his death only years later, through a terse note from Mao in response to her children's inquiries. She was released in December 1978. Perry argues that her life exemplified the paradoxes of Chinese communism, as the methods she had promoted in the countryside were turned against her.

== Later life ==
In 1979, Wang became director of the Foreign Affairs Bureau of the Chinese Academy of Social Sciences. She was a member of the 5th National Committee of the Chinese People's Political Consultative Conference and served on its Standing Committee from the 6th to the 9th National Committees. She devoted herself to restoring Liu's reputation, and he was posthumously rehabilitated in 1980.

Wang founded Project Happiness, a program to help mothers living in poverty, and directed it for more than ten years. In 1996, she auctioned antiques left to her by her mother and donated the proceeds of 566,000 yuan to the program. In October 1998, she received an honorary award at the third China Population Awards. In 2004, at the age of 83, she hosted a reunion of the descendants of Mao Zedong and Liu Shaoqi.

== Death ==
Wang died in Beijing on 13 October 2006, aged 85. Reuters, citing Taiwan's United Daily News, reported that she died of heart and kidney failure at a Beijing military hospital, and Chinese state media did not report her death at first. Her wake was held at the 305 Hospital. Her funeral took place at Babaoshan Revolutionary Cemetery on 21 October 2006, and more than a thousand mourners attended, including General Secretary Hu Jintao and CPPCC chairman Jia Qinglin. After her death, she received the achievement award of the second China Poverty Eradication Awards, and Project Happiness was named the best project.

== Family ==
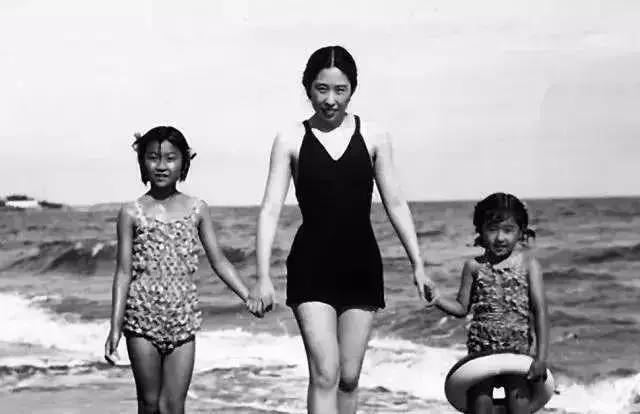
Wang Guangmei with her children at a beach (1960s)

Wang and Liu had one son and three daughters, and Liu had five children from earlier marriages. Their son, Liu Yuan, became a general and political commissar of the People's Liberation Army's General Logistics Department, retiring in December 2015. Their daughters were Liu Pingping, Liu Ting and Liu Xiaoxiao, the last of whom was six years old when her mother was arrested.

== Honors ==
- Grand Cross of the Royal Order of Cambodia (Cambodia, 5 October 1964)

== Works ==
- Wang Guangmei; Liu Yuan (2000). 你所不知道的刘少奇 [The Liu Shaoqi You Do Not Know] (in Chinese). Zhengzhou: Henan People's Publishing House. ISBN 7-215-04680-X.
- Huang Zheng (2004). 王光美访谈录 [Interviews with Wang Guangmei] (in Chinese). Beijing: Central Party Literature Press. ISBN 7-5073-2024-3.
- Wang Guangmei (2006). 我与少奇 [Shaoqi and I] (in Chinese). Beijing: Central Party Literature Press.

Honorary titles
Preceded by Jiang Qing	Spouse of the President of the People's Republic of China; 1959–1968	Succeeded by He Lianying
