= Hongan =

Hongan may refer to:

- Hong'an County, in Hubei, China
- Hongan-ji, school of Jōdo Shinshū Buddhism in Japan
