= Li Xiaolin (politician) =

Chinese politician

- 李小林
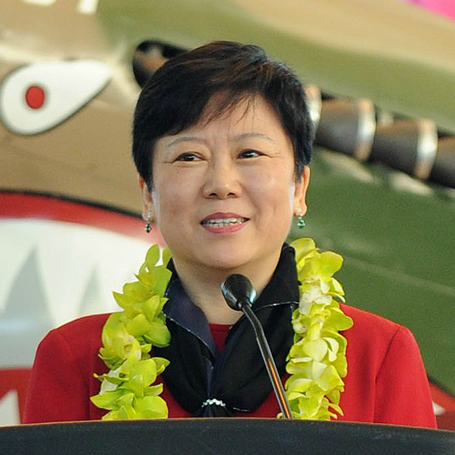

Chairperson of the Chinese People's Association for Friendship with Foreign Countries
- In office September 2011 – April 2020
- Preceded by: Chen Haosu
- Succeeded by: Lin Songtian

Personal details
- Born: October 21, 1953 (age 73) Hong'an County, Hubei
- Party: Chinese Communist Party
- Spouse: Liu Yazhou
- Children: 1
- Parent(s): Lin Jiamei; Li Xiannian
- Education: Wuhan University (BA); UCLA (MA)

Li Xiaolin (Chinese: 李小林) is a Chinese politician who served as party secretary and chairperson of the Chinese People's Association for Friendship with Foreign Countries. She is also a member of the 12th National Committee of the Chinese People's Political Consultative Conference.

== Career ==
From 1972 to 1975, Li studied at Wuhan University. In 1975, she was appointed Director of the Chinese People's Association for Friendship with Foreign Countries. After obtaining a Master's degree in the United States, she variably served as cadre, deputy director and director of the Chinese People's Association for Friendship with Foreign Countries between 1983 and 1990.

From 1990 to 1992, she served as First Secretary of the Embassy of China to the USA. From 1992 to 2007, Li alternatively served as deputy director and director of the Department of the Americas at the Chinese People 's Association for Friendship with Foreign Countries, as well as vice-chairperson and deputy party secretary of the Chinese People's Association for Friendship with Foreign Countries.

From 2007 to 2011, she was the vice-chairperson and party secretary of the Chinese People's Association for Friendship with Foreign Countries, before being made chairperson in September 2011. She stepped down from the post in April 2020 and was replaced by Lin Songtian.

== Personal life ==
Li is one of four children of former President of China, Li Xiannian and his second wife, Lin Jiamei.

== Awards ==
- Grand Officer of the National Order of Merit (Senegal, 2012)
- Friendship Order (Vietnam, 2017)
