= Lin Jiamei =

Widow of former Chinese president Li Xiannian (born 1924)

- 林佳楣
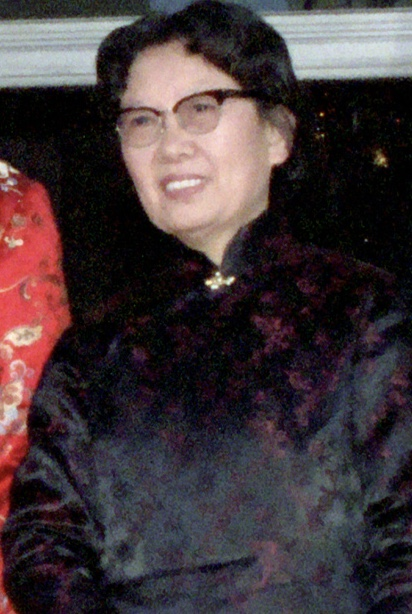
- Lin in 1985

Spouse of the President of China
- In office 18 June 1983 – 8 April 1988
- Preceded by: Vacant (see Wang Guangmei, wife of Liu Shaoqi)
- Succeeded by: Wang Yeping

Personal details
- Born: 21 June 1924 (age 101) Danyang, Jiangsu, China
- Spouse: Li Xiannian
- Children: 3, including Li Xiaolin
- Education: Tong De Medical College, Shanghai

Lin Jiamei (Chinese: 林佳楣; pinyin: Lín Jiāméi; born 21 June 1924) is the widow of former Chinese president Li Xiannian. She was the spouse of the president of the People's Republic of China from 1983 to 1988, along with de facto First Lady Zhuo Lin, the wife of then-paramount leader Deng Xiaoping.

== Career ==
Lin graduated from Tong De Medical College in 1949. Until the 1980s, she held positions as a pediatrician at the Hubei Provincial Hospital, the vice-president of the Wuhan Women and Children's Health Institute, a committee member on the State Council Family Planning Commission, and chief of the Women and Children's Health Bureau in the Ministry of Health. Lin was a representative at the 4th, 5th and 6th National People's Congresses. She was also a committee member on the 7th and 8th CPPCCs, in addition to being the deputy head of the 8th CPPCC Committee for Science, Education, Culture, Health and Sports. As of 2015, Lin reportedly serves as the president of the Chinese Association for Female Doctors, as well as a consultant to the Chinese Children's Development Center.

== Spouse of the president ==
Lin, like other Chinese president's spouse, did not often appear in public, but accompanied her husband when he met with foreign leaders, both in Beijing and abroad. She became close with her contemporary, U.S. First Lady Nancy Reagan. Lin accompanied Li Xiannian to the USA during the first official visit of President of China in July 1985. From 1984, Lin served as the deputy president of the China Medical Committee, as well as bureau chief of the Women and Children's Department of the Ministry of Health.

== Personal life ==
Lin was Li Xiannian's second wife. Together they had two daughters, Li Ziyang and Li Xiaolin, and one son, Li Ping. Lin also raised Li's daughter from his first marriage, Li Jin.

On 21 June 2024, she turned 100.
