= Yixin =

Yixin may refer to:

- Yixin, better known by his title Prince Gong, an imperial prince of the Aisin Gioro clan and an important statesman of the Manchu-led Qing dynasty in China
- Yixin (actress), Singaporean actress
- Yixin (software), a computer software playing Gomoku and Renju.
- Yixin, Xinghua, a village in Xinghua Township, Hong'an County, Huanggang, Hubei, China
