= Mao's swim in the Yangtze river =

1966 event by the Chairman of the Chinese Communist Party

- Date: 16 July 1966
- Location: Yangtze, Wuhan, China
- Participants: Mao Zedong and an estimated 5,000 swimmers

Chairman Mao's swim in the Yangtze river was a widely publicized and politically significant event by the Chairman of the Chinese Communist Party (CCP) and paramount leader of the People's Republic of China (PRC) Mao Zedong. The swim took place on July 16th 1966 in the city of Wuhan, as part of the 11th cross-Yangtze swimming contest, where 5,000 young swimmers were participating. Mao, aged 73 at the time, stayed in the water for 65 minutes and was reported as swimming 15 kilometres. However, The Times (reporting from 9 days after) as well as contemporary literature, mention that Mao was carried by the current, rather than swimming. Mao was joined by 6 waterborne bodyguards, giant portraits of himself on the water, and both Chinese and foreign guests.

The event came during a period of political turmoil at the beginning of the Cultural Revolution, and was proliferated widely through state media. The swim, and the media attention around it, was intended to demonstrate Mao's sustained physical vigour and rally support around him as the central figure in Chinese politics despite his age and increasingly hostile stance towards other party elements. The swim also has a significant legacy in modern China, where commemorative events are held to this day.

== Background ==
Since the 1950s, Mao had cultivated an image of himself as a swimmer, projecting his cult of personality into the physical, and recreational swimming scene. Swimming was promoted in national policy as a sign of individual and national strength. In 1956, after his first swim in the Yangtze at Wuhan, Mao repeated the endeavour 17 times, culminating in the 1966 swim. This was the biggest and most widely publicized swim, which aimed to provide a re-affirmation of Mao's leadership as he had spent months out of public view.

By the mid-1960s, following the Great Leap Forward and subsequent famines, senior party figures such as Chinese president Lui Shaoqi had drifted from Mao on economic policy as well as the cultural role of the party. In February 1966, the "February Outline" was issued by a group of CCP officials, led by Beijing mayor Peng Zhen. It attacked the cultural and academic policies of the party leftists. On May 16th 1966, after a meeting of the CCP Politburo, a notification was issued, spearheaded by Mao in response to this criticism. The notification heavily criticised the right of the party, emphasizing a need for political movements to defeat bourgeois party elements. This is commonly seen as the beginning of the cultural revolution and the start of Mao's desire to demonstrate his enduring vitality.

== State Media ==
Chairman Mao Zedong's swim in the Yangtze River was widely reported by the Chinese press. At the time, Mao's health had been the subject of ongoing speculation, and his whereabouts had been unknown for two months. On the 13th of July, three days before the swim, Peking newspapers printed front-page photographs of Mao receiving Crown Prince Birendra of Nepal and his delegation.

Nine days later, on the 25th of July, the swim was reported in a dispatch from the New China News Agency (NCNA). The agency stated that Mao had swum almost 15 kilometres in 65 minutes. It described his "glowing ruddy cheeks" and high spirits, details that presented him to the public as being in excellent health. The agency also reported that Wang Jen-chung (Wang Renzhong), Second Secretary of the Central-South Bureau of the CCP Central Committee and First Secretary of the Hupeh (Hubei) Provincial Party Committee, had asked Mao to return to the escort boat because of the waves. According to the report, Mao declined, saying that it was "not even an hour yet".

Following the agency's reports, three large photographs of the swim were reproduced and circulated in large numbers, and the People's Daily published an editorial on the event. The newspapers were handed out for free, people even queuing for copies; people celebrating Mao's swim like a National Day. The coverage presented Mao and the estimated 5,000 swimmers who accompanied him as examples of resolve and self-sacrifice. It described the swimmers as having "formed a great wall on the surface of the river", an image linked to the strength and unity of the Chinese people. The People's Daily editorial, titled "Following Chairman Mao", compared swimming to revolution:

To learn to swim without plunging into the water just doesn't work. No one has ever learned to swim just by standing on the shore and reading about one or another aspect of the art of swimming. And the same is true of making revolution. You must take part in actual class struggle, master the laws governing revolution in the storm of class struggle, and learn the art of swimming in class struggle.

== International Coverage ==
The swim was seen by some Western media sources as a well-planned political show meant to show Mao's virility in the midst of internal Chinese Communist Party strife. Additionally, claims of Mao's accomplishments were met with heavy skepticism by the international community. This later is particularly clear in the Time Magazine, which wrote:

Although Mao was in his early 70s, party propagandists claimed that the Chairman had swum nearly 15 km in 65 min that day – a world-record pace, if true

They went on to write:

...if he really did the nine miles in 65 minutes, it would be approximately four times as fast as the world's best-known ten-mile swimming record. So impressed was the president of the World Professional Marathon Swimming Federation that he invited Mao to enter two long-distance races that his association will sponsor this summer in Canada...

Western media used a skeptical or humorous tone when referring to the event. This cast doubt on the official narratives of his performance, while emphasizing how propagandistic the event appeared to the outside world. The overarching Western perspective was best outlined in the Time article 'The Chairman's Historic Swim':

The contention elicited guffaws from foreign observers, who took the claim as a sign that China was descending into political madness.

However, Western newspapers were not the only ones to question Mao's prowess. The doubtfulness of the swim's length and timing was first discovered by Taiwan's United Daily paper. They argued that if the current accounts for 70% of the speed the distance Mao swam would still take the world record swimmer 72 minutes, notably longer than Mao's 65 minute swim.

Following the sceptical international coverage, defenders of the CCP's reports wrote that the statistics were possible due to the strong current of the river, favorable wind, and that Mao swam downstream. The coverage of Mao's swim illustrates the divergent depictions within media on Mao's leadership at a critical juncture in contemporary Chinese history.

== Political Significance for Mao ==
The symbolism of Mao's swim was crucial to solidifying his cult of personality. Swimming became an avenue for mobilizing mass support as well as a location for people to practice Maoism. As such, swimming became a performance of expressing Maoist ideology in public. Mao had often referred to his enjoyment of swimming, and had used public displays of swimming previously in order to signify personal strength. However the publicity of the Yangtze swim transformed the sport from a leisure activity into a militarized political duty and an integral part of the Mao ideology. Taking part in swimming was interpreted as an outward expression of a person's inner belief in Mao Zedong thought. For Mao and his followers, swimming was a collective ritual intended to show conformity to Maoism.

The swim has also been interpreted as an example of 'body politic' as the event used Mao's body as a vessel for his political ideology. By creating an image of himself as an athletic and energetic leader, Mao was able to successfully use his own body as a manifestation of his political agenda. The promotion of swimming became a way for supporters to show their support as Mao had become inextricably linked to the sport which became a visible expression of political mobilization and activism. Additionally, Mao was inspired by the Soviet Ready for Labour and Defence programme, otherwise known as the GTO sports programme. Through this scheme, the government promoted a 'mass sport' as a way to create a physical and cultural ideology that prepared the population for labor and defense, thereby underlining the idea of a collective body. This philosophy was later expanded to create 'Lao Weizhi'(劳卫制), the Chinese interpretation of the GTO programme.

Moreover, the swim was used by the party to dispel any rumors about Mao's health, helping to consolidate his political power and impress upon the people his longevity and authority. The symbolism of the swim fed into the idea that he was a strong, vigorous leader, ready to take on any challenge.

== Significance to the Cultural Revolution ==
Mao's swim came exactly two months after the May 16, 1966 notification that started the cultural revolution in earnest and deepened the connection of Mao's health to political strength. After the swim, Mao's demonstration of vitality was foundational to the Bombard the Headquarters campaign that followed his return to Beijing. In state media releases, Mao's swim served as a mirror for the Party's ideological youth and hopefulness.

Mao sought to tie the success of the regime to his physical health. There was a genuine "swimming mania" at the time and Mao's multiple poems about swimming were said to be read in the streets. In this sense, the swim had a direct impact on the regime and signified that he was a suitable leader of the revolution.

In line with the broader themes of the cultural revolution, Mao's swim was said to have a unifying effect on minority groups. The New China News Agency (NCNA) wrote that emancipated serfs in Tibet declared that the news brings all China's ethnicities joy without measure. In Xinjiang, the NCNA reports of a Uyghur forge working hailing Mao's strong will and a welder in Sibo declared "I will always follow Chairman Mao".

Typical to the broader cultural revolution, Mao's swim became entwined with Chinese victory over US imperialism. The NCNA in August, compared the breadth of the Yangtze to the scale of US imperialism and Mao's conquering of the Yangtze resembled his victory over the West. In light of the escalating US involvement in Vietnam, the NCNA wrote that "We must follow Chairman Mao's teachings and go to steel ourselves in large rivers, in wind and storm, to become revolutionary fighters who can scale mountains and cross waters".

== Legacy ==
Mao's swim still holds implications to this day, with an annual commemorative swim held on July 16th in Wuhan. Despite swimming no longer being the national sport of China, Mao's Yangtze swim legacy still exerts a lingering influence on modern China's sporting culture.

Similarly, the trend of nationalizing sport has continued, with current PRC General Secretary Xi Jinping prioritizing football within the educational curriculum and the high-school entrance exam. With Wang Dengfeng, the Minister for Education saying:

[We must] start with children to improve the football standard in China

== Bibliography ==
- An, Yalun, Jing Yang, Shuanghong Jenny Niu, and Jun Wang. 2022. "Health First: The Sustainable Development of Physical Education in Chinese Schools." Sustainability 14 (5): 3133. https://doi.org/10.3390/su14053133.
- Bandurski, David. 2016. "Super Swimmer Mao Zedong - China Media Project." China Media Project, May 16. https://chinamediaproject.org/2016/05/16/super-swimmer-mao-zedong/.
- Carter, James. 2021. "Power of Symbolism: The Swim That Changed Chinese History." The China Project, July 14. https://thechinaproject.com/2021/07/14/power-of-symbolism-the-swim-that-changed-chinese-history/.
- Dikötter, Frank. 2016. The Cultural Revolution : A People's History, 1962-1976. Bloomsbury Publishing.
- Freeberne, Michael. 1966. "The Great Splash Forward." Problems of Communism 15 (6).
- Haoran Ni, Julia. 2023. "Leisure, Body, and Politics: A History of Swimming in Modern China." Sport History Review 54 (1): 149–50. https://doi.org/10.1123/shr.2023-0005.
- Heaver, Stuart. 2016. "Chairman Mao's Historic Swim – Glorified in China but Ridiculed by the Rest of the World." South China Morning Post, August 4. https://www.scmp.com/magazines/post-magazine/long-reads/article/1999098/chairman-maos-historic-swim-glorified-china.
- Lu, Zhouxiang, and Fan Hong. 2013. Sport and Nationalism in China. Taylor & Francis Group.
- MACFARQUHAR, RODERICK, and MICHAEL SCHOENHALS. 2009. Mao's Last Revolution. Harvard University Press.
- Moldonado, Angelica. 2018. "Long Live Chairman Mao!' The Cultural Revolution and the Mao." Master's Thesis, Bard College.
- Poon, Shuk-Wah. 2019. "Embodying Maoism: The Swimming Craze, the Mao Cult, and Body Politics in Communist China, 1950S–1970S." Modern Asian Studies 53 (05): 1450–85. https://doi.org/10.1017/s0026749x17000804.
- SOLOMON, RICHARD H. 1999. "The Chairman's Historic Swim." TIME, Nextgen, September 27. https://time.com/archive/6955390/the-chairmans-historic-swim/.
- Spirin V.K. 2014. "On Development of Regulatory Requirements of the GTO ('Ready for Labour and Defence' Complex) Within Implementation of Health Forming Approach to Sports Activity of Russian People." Theory and Practice of Physical Culture, no. 11. https://cyberleninka.ru/article/n/on-development-of-regulatory-requirements-of-the-gto-ready-for-labour-and-defence-complex-within-implementation-of-health-forming-approach.
- TIME. 1966. "Red China: The Great Splash Forward." TIME, Time, August 5. https://time.com/archive/6629989/red-china-the-great-splash-forward/.
- The Times, 1966. "Mr. Maos' swim given wide publicity". Retrieved 3rd November 2026. http://link.galegroup.com/apps/doc/GALE%7CCS17263354/TTDA
- Zheng, Jinming, Shushu Chen, Tien-Chin Tan, and Patrick Wing Chung Lau. 2018. "Sport Policy in China (Mainland)." International Journal of Sport Policy and Politics 10 (3): 469–91. https://doi.org/10.1080/19406940.2017.1413585.
- Zhuang Pinghui. 2014. "Beijing Makes Big Play to Realise Xi Jinping's Dreams for Soccer Greatness." South China Morning Post, December 8. https://www.scmp.com/news/china/article/1657332/beijing-boost-football-xi-jinpings-favourite-sport-100000-students-three.
