= Weidoushan Reservoir =

- Interactive map of Weidoushan Reservoir
- Country: China
- Coordinates: 31.199°N 114.746°E
- Purpose: irrigation and flood control
- Construction began: November 17, 1959

Weidoushan Reservoir (simplified Chinese: 尾斗山水库; traditional Chinese: 尾斗山水庫; pinyin: Wěidòushān shuǐkù) is a reservoir in Hong'an County, Huanggang City, Hubei Province, China, located on the Yangjia River, a tributary of the Jushui River. It is a large reservoir mainly for irrigation and supplementary for flood control. The Reservoir belongs to the Yangtze River system.

The construction of Weidoushan Reservoir started on November 17, 1959, and was basically completed in the end of April 1961. It is the second largest reservoir in Hong'an County. The rain-bearing area of its reservoir region is 74 square kilometers, with a total capacity of 109.8 million cubic meters.
