= Bombard the Headquarters =

1966 document by Mao Zedong

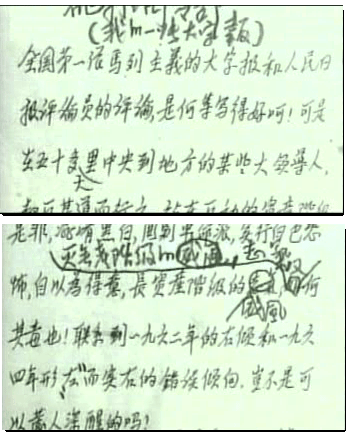
Mao's handwritten draft of "Bombard the Headquarters"

Bombard The Headquarters – My Big-Character Poster (Chinese: 炮打司令部——我的一张大字报; pinyin: Pào dǎ sīlìng bù——wǒ de yī zhāng dàzì bào) was a short document written by Chairman Mao Zedong on August 5, 1966, during the 11th plenary session of the 8th Central Committee of the Chinese Communist Party, and published in the Communist Party's official newspaper People's Daily a year later, on August 5, 1967.

In this big-character poster, Mao called on the masses to "bombard the headquarters", urging rebellion against the Communist Party and his Party rivals who he alleged were exercising a "bourgeois dictatorship". It is commonly believed that the poster directly targeted Chinese President Liu Shaoqi and senior leader Deng Xiaoping, who were then in charge of the Chinese government's daily affairs and who tried to cool down the mass movement which had been coming into shape in several universities in Beijing since the May 16 Notice was issued, through which Mao officially launched the Cultural Revolution.

After the poster was published, big-character posters flourished throughout China, becoming a key medium of political radicalization and expression in the early Cultural Revolution. Many larger-scale mass persecutions followed the publication of this big-character poster, resulting in turmoil throughout the country and the death of thousands of "class enemies", including President Liu Shaoqi.

== Text ==
The original text of the poster was:

全国第一张马列主义的大字报和人民日报评论员的评论，写得何等好呵！请同志们重读这一张大字报和这个评论。可是在50多天里，从中央到地方的某些领导同志，却反其道而行之，站在反动的资产阶级立场上，实行资产阶级专政，将无产阶级轰轰烈烈的文化大革命运动打下去，颠倒是非，混淆黑白，围剿革命派，压制不同意见，实行白色恐怖，自以为得意，长资产阶级的威风，灭无产阶级的志气，又何其毒也！联想到1962年的右倾和1964年形“左”实右的错误倾向，岂不是可以发人深醒的吗？

English translation:

China's first Marxist-Leninist big-character poster and Commentator's article on it in People's Daily are indeed superbly written! Comrades, please read them again. But in the last fifty days or so some leading comrades from the central down to the local levels have acted in a diametrically opposite way. Adopting the reactionary stand of the bourgeoisie, they have enforced a bourgeois dictatorship and struck down the surging movement of the Great Cultural Revolution of the proletariat. They have stood facts on their head and juggled black and white, encircled and suppressed revolutionaries, stifled opinions differing from their own, imposed a white terror, and felt very pleased with themselves. They have puffed up the arrogance of the bourgeoisie and deflated the morale of the proletariat. How poisonous! Viewed in connection with the Right deviation in 1962 and the wrong tendency of 1964 which was 'Left' in form but Right in essence, shouldn't this make one wide awake?

— "Selected Works of Mao Tse-tung Volume IX"

=== Content ===
The "first Marxist-Leninist big-character poster" Mao makes mention of was the 25 May 1966 poster created and displayed by Peking University radicals, Nie Yuanzi among them, which was a key trigger of the Cultural Revolution.

Though Mao's poster only vaguely targeted "some leading comrades" who had "enforced a bourgeois dictatorship and struck down the surging movement of the great Cultural Revolution of the proletariat", everyone at the time knew that the person under attack was Liu Shaoqi. Mao alludes to the White Terror of the 1920s–1930s, during which communists were persecuted and killed by the Kuomintang.

Mao's reference to "Right deviation in 1962" refers to Liu Shaoqi's statements during the Seven Thousand Cadres Conference that the Great Leap Forward famine was caused predominantly by human error. Mao's reference to "the wrong tendency of 1964" refers to Liu Shaoqi's leadership of the Socialist Education Movement, and the Taoyuan Experience report, during which Mao and Liu came to be divided.

== Impact ==
The poster became iconic overnight, provided fuel to the Red Guards movement, and made the big-character poster a key medium of political radicalization and expression in the first two years of the Cultural Revolution. Red Guards and student radicals created posters criticizing Liu Shaoqi at Tsinghua University and in Beijing, and big-character posters soon covered walls in schools, university campuses, "government offices, factories, along streets, places of worship and throughout the countryside". Artwork and posters depicting Mao penning the poster flourished. Relations further deteriorated between Mao and Liu, who was then still Mao's ostensible successor; there was surprise that Mao would attack his successor so openly. Zhou Enlai promoted the poster, and Wu Faxian recalled that Zhou stated, "Liu Shaoqi can no longer be in charge of the Central Committee's work, because he has disappointed the Chairman's hopes. The Central Committee has now decided to bring comrade Lin Biao to Beijing to take over from Liu Shaoqi." Maurice Meisner writes that Mao's call to bombard the headquarters is remarkable in that it came from the Party chairman and most preeminent veteran of the revolution, who came to regard the very state and Party institutions he had helped to build as obstacles that needed to be overturned, rather than as tools of, revolutionary social change.

== See also ==
- Cultural Revolution
- Socialist Education Movement
- History of the Chinese Communist Party
- Red Guards
- Propaganda in the People's Republic of China
- Big-character posters during the Cultural Revolution
