= Fengqiao experience =

Chinese Communist Party governance tactic

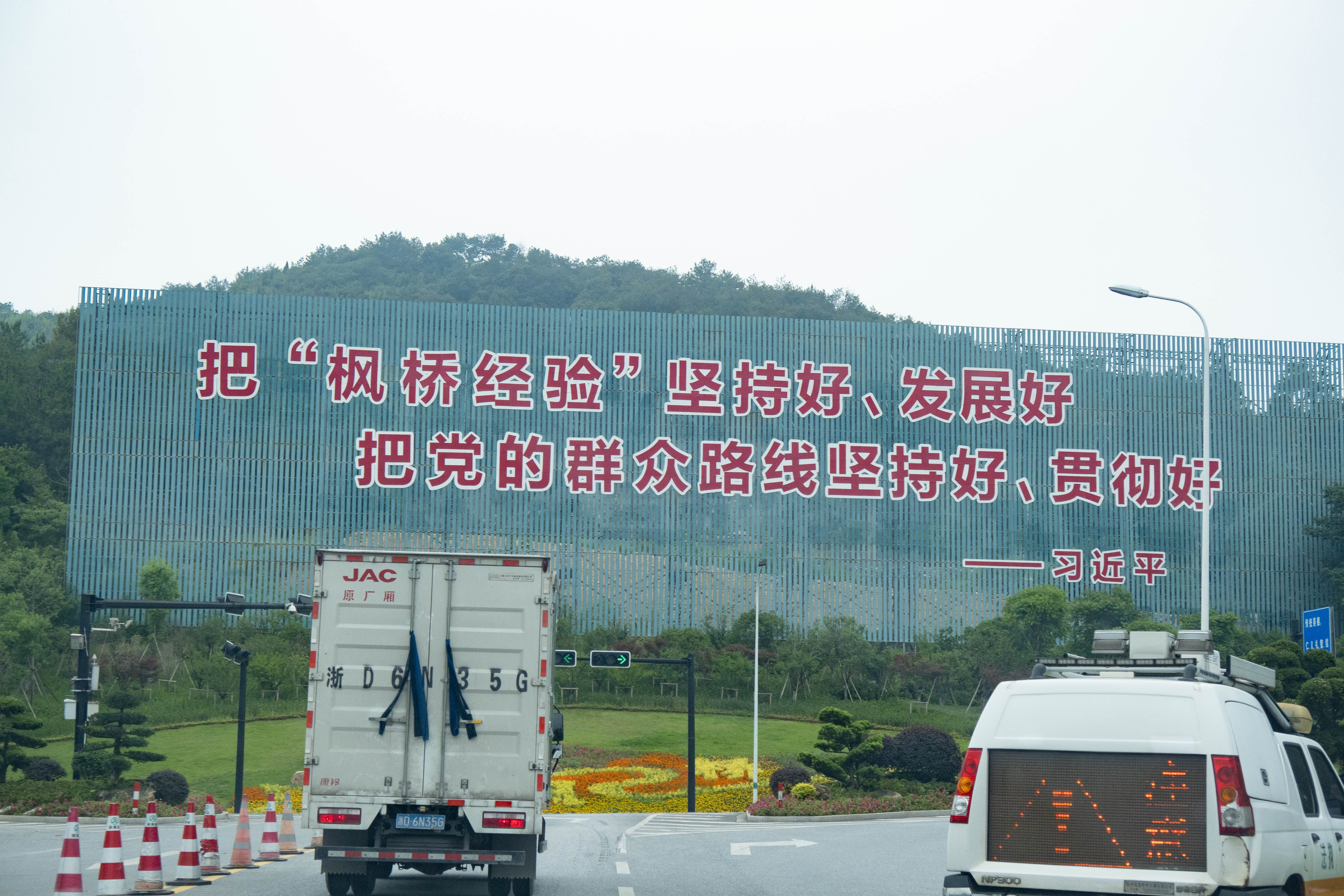
A poster for the Fenqiao experience in Zhejiang

Fengqiao experience (Chinese: 枫桥经验; pinyin: Fēngqiáo jīngyàn) is a method used by the Chinese Communist Party (CCP) officially to contain and resolve conflicts at the grassroots level without needing to involve higher legal bodies. First originating from the Fenqiao District of Zhuji, Shaoxing in the early 1960s, the term was popularized again under the general secretaryship of Xi Jinping. It has been associated with systems of mass surveillance in China.

== History ==
Fengqiao experience first emerged in the Fenqiao District of Zhuji, Zhejiang as a way to mobilize the masses to address social conflicts at the grassroots level without needing the involvement of higher legal institutions. In 1963, as part of the Socialist Education Movement launched by Chairman of the Chinese Communist Party Mao Zedong, the Zhejiang Provincial CCP Committee published a document titled Experiences in Struggling Against the Enemy During the Socialist Education Movement in Fengqiao District, Zhuji County (诸暨县枫桥区社会主义教育运动中开展对敌斗争的经验), summarizing the methods used in the Fenqiao District. Xie Fuzhi, the minister of public security, made specific mention of the methods used in Fenqiao in the annual session of the National People's Congress in 1963. On 20 November 1963, Mao wrote an instruction to Xie, writing "The example of Zhuji raised here is a good one — various regions should follow this example, expanding the work through pilot programs." On 20 November, he spoke with deputy minister of public security Wang Dongxing, where he called on to educate and mobilize the masses based on the example in Zhuji.

While the Ministry of Public Security released materials about the methods, the People's Daily never mentioned the Fenqiao experience until 21 December 1977, when it published an article titled Raising High the Red Flag of Fengqiao Erected by Mao Zedong, Relying on the Masses to Strengthen Dictatorship (高举毛主席树立的枫桥红旗 依靠群众加强专政), which stated:

In the struggle against the enemy, arrest is necessary and proper for a small number of class enemies; as for those you can choose to arrest or not, none should be arrested; you must mobilize the masses to carry out a struggle of reason, to deal with the enemies, carrying out on-site monitoring and rehabilitation, without the need to submit issues to higher authorities. This experience was affirmed and praised by the greater leader and teacher Mao Zedong.

On 5 September 1978, the People's Daily published another article titled Rectifying and Strengthening Public Security Work (整顿和加强社会治安工作), which stated "Fengqiao District in Zhejiang’s Zhuji County relied on the masses to carry out on-site rectification of reactionary elements, reforming the vast majority of them into self-supporting laborers for the law." It continued by saying "Their successful experience was praised by Mao Zedong, and was known as a red flag on the front lines of public security."

=== Under Xi Jinping ===
When he was the CCP committee secretary of Zhejiang, Xi Jinping showed at interest to the Fenqiao experience after visiting the district in 2003, where he attended an exhibition about the 1960s at a local police station. He visited the district again a few months later, where he said "Though the situation and responsibilities we face have changed, the Fengqiao experience is not outdated".

in 2013, Xi Jinping, now the CCP general secretary, became the first paramount leader since Mao to mention the Fenqiao experience by issuing "important instructions on the development of the ‘Fengqiao experience’" to mark the 50th anniversary of Mao's written instructions. In 2019, the Ministry of Public Security started upgrading public security stations to "Fengqiao-style public security police stations" (枫桥式公安派出所), with over 1,300 established by 2025. The main tasks of the stations are "loyalty to party leadership, legal service to the people, impartial law enforcement and rigorous discipline" in order to "create a secure and stable political and social environment". Since 2022, these stations have also been supported by "Fengqiao-style People’s courts" established in villages and counties, which aim to "fight against evil and illegal behavior and sustain the fight against village hegemony".

At the political report for the CCP's 20th National Congress in October 2022, Xi referred to the Fenqiao experience as a vital part of "social governance". In November 2023, Xi attended a conference on the Fenqiao experience, and also hosted representatives from local authorities that apply the Fengqiao experience in daily administration. In the conference, Secretary of the Central Political and Legal Affairs Commission Chen Wenqing said China "must achieve that ‘small things do not leave the village, big things do not leave the town, and conflicts do not turn over’".

==== Overseas ====
In 2025, Chinese police under the Ministry of Public Security operating in the Solomon Islands began to implement a local pilot program based upon the Fengqiao experience, raising mass surveillance concerns.

== Content ==
The CCP-led method aims to have officials and locals apply a form of self-governance to solve issues and conflicts at their level. The method has been described as a "gold standard for Chinese governance" by CCP journal Qiushi. The method involves working with volunteers and instructing local residents in ideological and legal matters, especially regarding locally relevant new laws and regulations. As part of the method, court officials travel around counties to mediate legal disputes, ranging from land use, licenses, or contract issues.

== See also ==
- Mass surveillance in China
- Stability maintenance
