= Huang'an-Macheng Uprising =

Huangma Uprising
- Part of the Chinese Civil War
| Date | 13 November – 5 December 1927 |
| Location | Huang'an County and Macheng, Hubei, China |
| Result | Nationalist victory: The Kuomintang suppressed the uprising |

Belligerents
| Nationalist government | Chinese Communist Party |

Commanders and leaders
| (Taiwan) Ren Yingqi (Taiwan) He Shouzhong | Pan Zhongru †; Wu Guanghao †; Fu Xiangyi (executed) |

Strength
| ~2000 | 3000+ peasants and militia |

Casualties and losses
| 19 captured landowners | 228 casualties |

Huangma Uprising, also known as the Huangma Revolt, was an armed uprising launched by the Chinese Communist Party on 13 November 1927 during the Chinese Civil War in Huang'an County (now Hong'an County) and Macheng, Hubei. More than 30,000 peasant self-defense forces and volunteer militias participated in the revolt, and the Huang'an Peasants' Government was established.

== Course of the uprising ==
On 13 November 1927, the Chinese Communist Party's Huangma Special Committee ordered an armed uprising in Huang'an County and Macheng, Hubei. More than 20,000 peasant self-defense forces and militia gathered at Qiliping and marched toward Huang'an County seat. In the early hours of 14 November, the insurgents attacked Huang'an from several directions and captured the county seat. The Huang'an Peasants' Government and the Eastern Hubei Peasants' Revolutionary Army were subsequently established. On 18 November, the Huang'an Peasants' Government was formally established, while the peasant self-defense forces of Huang'an and Macheng were reorganized into the Eastern Hubei Peasants' Revolutionary Army.

In early December, Nationalist forces launched a major counterattack. On the night of 5 December, Nationalist troops advanced on Huang'an from the direction of Songbu and Yinjiahe. The insurgents and militia defended the city and initially repelled several attacks, but by around 4 a.m. on 6 December, the Nationalist forces broke through the city defenses. The insurgents fought their way out and suffered heavy casualties. Pan Zhongru and Wang Zhiyin were killed during the breakout.The surviving forces withdrew toward the Mulan Mountains and subsequently continued guerrilla warfare in the Huang'an–Macheng–Guangshan border region. In January 1928, the Eastern Hubei Peasants' Revolutionary Army was reorganized as the 7th Army, laying the foundation for the later establishment of the E-Yu-Wan Soviet.

== See also ==
- Chinese Communist Revolution
