= Li Xiannian =

President of China from 1983 to 1988

- 李先念
- Li at the White House in 1985

President of China
- In office 18 June 1983 – 8 April 1988
- Premier: Zhao Ziyang; Li Peng
- Vice President: Ulanhu
- Leader: Deng Xiaoping
- Preceded by: Liu Shaoqi (as State Chairman); Ye Jianying (as Head of State)
- Succeeded by: Yang Shangkun

5th Chairman of the National Committee of the Chinese People's Political Consultative Conference
- In office 10 April 1988 – 21 June 1992
- Preceded by: Deng Yingchao
- Succeeded by: Li Ruihuan
Other office held
Vice Chairman of the Chinese Communist Party
In office 19 August 1977 – 15 June 1982
Chairman	Hua Guofeng; Hu Yaobang
Vice Premier of China
In office 27 September 1954 – 10 September 1980
Premier	Zhou Enlai; Hua Guofeng
Minister of Finance
In office 19 June 1954 – 22 June 1970
Premier	Zhou Enlai
Preceded by	Deng Xiaoping
Succeeded by	Yin Chengzhen

Member of the National People's Congress
- In office 15 September 1954 – 25 March 1988
- Constituency: Hubei At-large

Personal details
- Born: 23 June 1909 Hong'an County, Hubei, Qing China
- Died: 21 June 1992 (aged 82) Beijing, China
- Party: Chinese Communist Party (joined in 1927)
- Spouse(s): Shang Xiaoping (尚小平) (div); Lin Jiamei
- Children: 4, including Li Xiaolin

Chinese name
- Chinese: 李先念
Transcriptions
Standard Mandarin
- Hanyu Pinyin: Lǐ Xiānniàn
- Wade–Giles: Li Hsien-nien

Li Xiannian ([lì ɕjɛ́nnjɛ̂n]; 23 June 1909 – 21 June 1992) was a Chinese Communist military and political leader, president of China from 1983 to 1988 under paramount leader Deng Xiaoping and then chairman of the Chinese People's Political Consultative Conference from 1988 until his death. He was a full member of the Politburo from 1956 to 1987, and of its Standing Committee from 1977 to 1987.

Li worked as an apprentice carpenter in his teenage years to support his family. He joined the Communist Party in December 1927 and became a soldier in the Chinese Red Army. After studying at the Military–Political University and the Central Party School, he became an influential and successful military commander during the Second Sino-Japanese War and the Chinese Civil War, distinguishing himself in the Huaihai campaign.

After the PRC was established, he served as Governor and Party Secretary of his native Hubei Province from 1949 to 1954, and then joined the central leadership in Beijing, serving as Minister of Finance (1954–1970) and Vice Premier (1954–1982). He supported Mao Zedong's designated successor, Hua Guofeng, and was named Vice Chairman of the Party (1977–1982).

He was considered one of the conservatives among the Eight Elders of the Party, both politically and economically. Li played a key role in blocking marketization and maintaining state control in many sectors of the economy. He promoted classical Communist political and cultural values through his patronage of theorists such as Hu Qiaomu and Deng Liqun, and was instrumental in purging the liberals Hu Yaobang and Zhao Ziyang. He enthusiastically advocated for military suppression of the 1989 Tiananmen Square protests.

== Early life ==
Li was born on 23 June 1909 in Huang'an County (now Hong'an), Hubei. He came from a poor family and received only three years of schooling at a traditional private school. As a teenager, he worked in a carpenter's shop to support his family. He joined the Chinese Communist Party in December 1927 and led local peasants in the Huang–Ma Uprising. In late 1929, he became party secretary and chairman of the soviet government of Gaoqiao District in Huang'an County, where he was noted for his standing among the local population.

== Red Army and the Long March ==
In October 1931, Li led more than 300 young recruits into the Red Army and was made political commissar of the 33rd Regiment of the 11th Division. He took part in several major battles of the Fourth Front Army, and in July 1932, he was promoted to political commissar of the 11th Division. When the army's main force withdrew westward in October 1932, he helped break through the Nationalist encirclement at Xinji and was seriously wounded in fighting at Ziwu. In the new Sichuan–Shaanxi base area, he was appointed to the Northwest Revolutionary Military Committee, and in July 1933, he became political commissar of the 30th Army. He led the raid on Dazhou and played a central role in the victory over Sichuan warlord forces at Huangmaoya.

In 1935, during the Long March, Li led the vanguard of the Fourth Front Army that captured Maogong in western Sichuan and linked up with the First Front Army. In 1936, part of the Fourth Front Army crossed the Yellow River in Gansu and moved west as the West Route Army, with Li as one of its military cadres under Zhang Guotao. After the army's defeat in 1937, he led its remnants into Xinjiang, and he reached Yan'an at the end of that year. In Yan'an, he studied at the Counter-Japanese Military and Political University and the Central Party School. Like other military cadres who had served in the West Route Army, he came under political pressure there.

== Second Sino-Japanese War ==
During the Second Sino-Japanese War, Li was sent to the Hubei–Henan region to lead guerrilla forces and establish an anti-Japanese base area. He headed the military department of the party's Henan Provincial Committee and then commanded the Henan–Hubei Advance Column of the New Fourth Army. He later became commander and political commissar of the New Fourth Army's 5th Division and secretary of the party's Henan–Hubei Border Region Committee, building up the Henan–Hubei anti-Japanese base area. Christopher Lew and Edwin Leung describe him as an influential and successful military commander in this war and in the civil war that followed. In 1945, he was elected a full member of the 7th Central Committee.

== Chinese Civil War ==
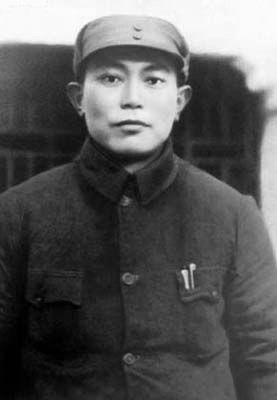
Li in the People's Liberation Army during the Civil War (1946)

After the Japanese surrender, Li became commander of the Central Plains Military Region and deputy secretary of the party's Central Plains Bureau. In 1946, he led the defense of the Central Plains Liberated Area and was then ordered to take his forces into Hubei, Henan and neighboring areas to carry on guerrilla warfare. In 1948, he became second deputy commander of the enlarged Central Plains Military Region and a member of the Central Plains Bureau, assisting Liu Bocheng and Deng Xiaoping in their military and political work. He played a key role in many Communist victories in the Central Plains, most significantly the Huaihai campaign.

== Hubei ==
After the founding of the People's Republic of China in 1949, Li became commander and political commissar of the Hubei Military District and secretary of the party's Hubei Provincial Committee. He served as chairman of the Hubei Provincial People's Government, the province's governor, from 1950 to 1954. From 1953 to 1954, he was also party secretary and mayor of Wuhan. At the regional level, he was deputy secretary of the party's Central-South Bureau and vice chairman of the Central-South Military and Administrative Committee.

== Economic official under Mao ==
In 1954, Li moved to Beijing as Vice Premier of the State Council and concurrently Minister of Finance. Britannica describes him as a supporter of the Soviet model of central planning. He was elected to the Politburo in 1956 and remained a member through the 12th Central Committee. In May 1958, he was co-opted as a secretary of the Central Secretariat. The Christian Science Monitor later described him as an economic planner who had criticized Mao's unrealistic economic policies of the 1950s. After the famine caused by the Great Leap Forward, he helped rebuild the economy. In 1962, he also became deputy director of the State Planning Commission.

== Cultural Revolution ==
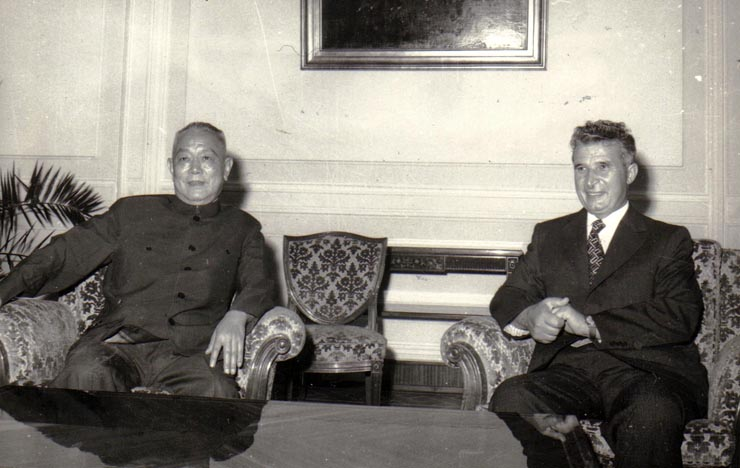
Li with Nicolae Ceaușescu prior to the 30th anniversary of the liberation of Romania, 22 August 1974

During the Cultural Revolution, Li assisted Premier Zhou Enlai in running the economy. In 1967, he was part of the February Countercurrent, in which senior leaders criticized the Cultural Revolution for creating social disorder and undermining the party leadership. He was nonetheless re-elected to the Politburo in April 1969. Roderick MacFarquhar wrote that Li was the only senior civilian official to serve alongside Zhou throughout the Cultural Revolution. The Christian Science Monitor noted that, unlike many of his colleagues, he came through the period largely unharmed.

In October 1976, Li played an important role in the arrest of the Gang of Four, according to official Chinese accounts. A few days after the arrest, he privately told Hua Guofeng that the verdict on the Tiananmen Incident of April 1976, for which Deng Xiaoping had been blamed, appeared shaky, implying that Deng's case should be reconsidered.

== Post-Mao politician ==
In 1977, Li was elected to the Politburo Standing Committee and became a vice chairman of the 11th Central Committee. As Hua rose to leadership during Mao's last days, Li became Hua's principal economic adviser, and MacFarquhar judged that he would have been "a power in the land" had Hua survived as leader. The Christian Science Monitor described him as close to Hua. According to Britannica, Li initially opposed Deng but later accepted his leadership and took the blame for the deficits in the economy. He resigned as vice premier in 1980 and was re-elected to the Standing Committee in 1982.

Li never got over the loss of these prospects, nor his resentment that Zhao Ziyang had inherited his role. According to MacFarquhar, he regularly grumbled that his own achievements during the brief Hua interregnum should be acknowledged, asking, "Weren't there successes in the past too?" Loren Brandt and Thomas G. Rawski wrote that, in economic policy, the most important elders were Li and Chen Yun. MacFarquhar called Li "the most prominent opponent of reform" among them. In his secret memoir, Zhao wrote that Li "hated me because I was implementing Deng Xiaoping's reforms, but since it was difficult for him to openly oppose Deng, he made me the target of his opposition."

== Presidency ==
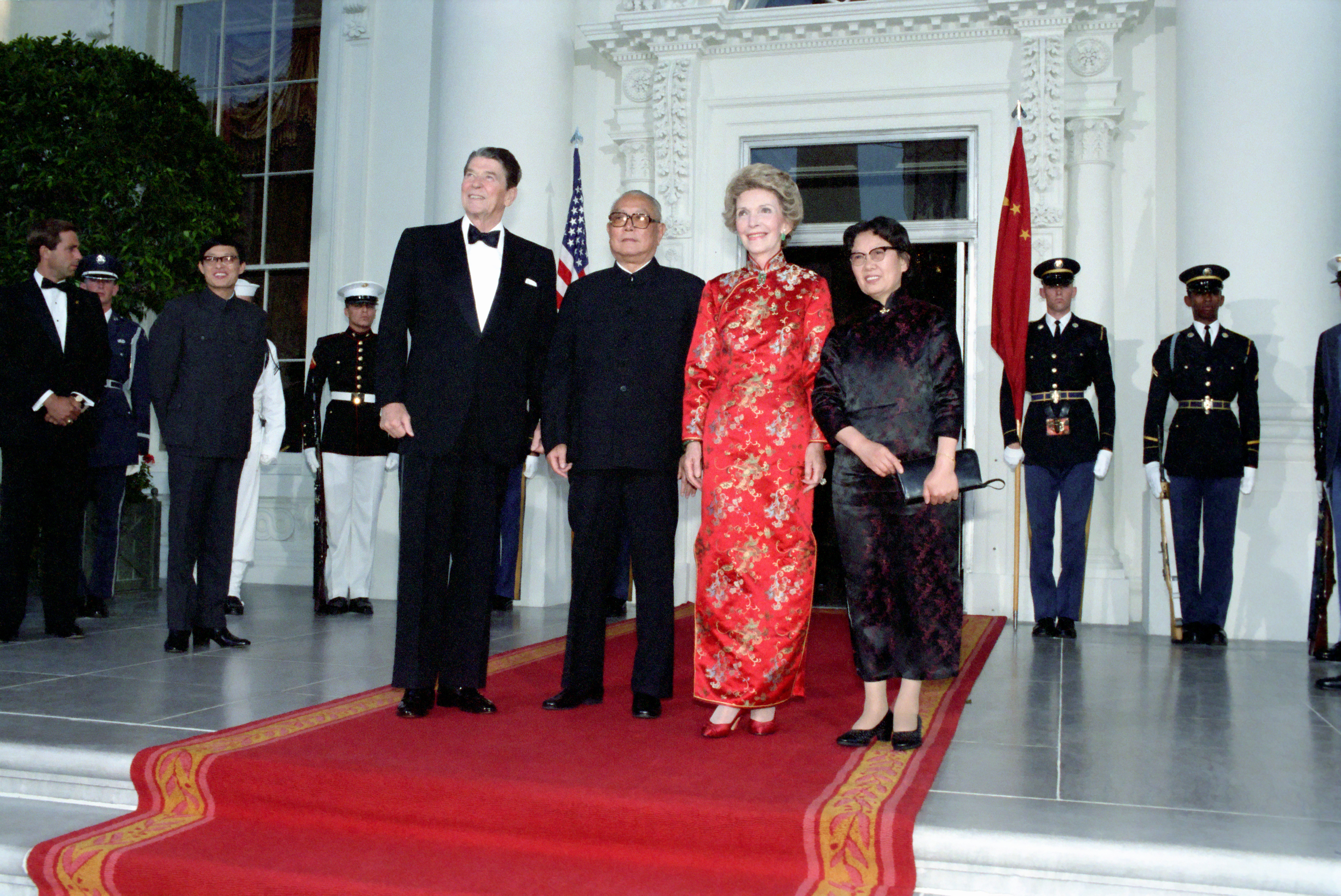
Li and his wife with Ronald Reagan and Nancy Reagan before a state dinner at the White House, 1985

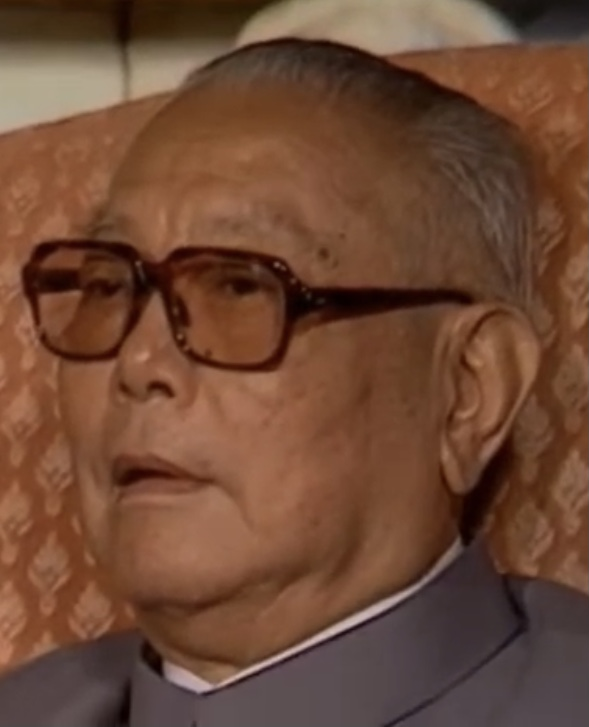
Li as president, 1985

In June 1983, the 6th National People's Congress elected Li President of the People's Republic of China. Before the vote, Chinese officials made no secret that they expected the congress to choose him, and diplomats saw his selection as a compromise between Deng's reformers and more conservative officials. Diplomats also believed that the post would pose little threat to the authority of Deng, Premier Zhao or party leader Hu Yaobang with Li in it. The presidency was a largely ceremonial post.

Li met Reagan during the American president's visit to China in April 1984, and the two discussed the status of Taiwan. In August 1984, Li visited Romania, where met Romanian leader Nicolae Ceaușescu. In September, he made his first official visit to Yugoslavia, where he opened in Zagreb the largest exhibition of Chinese art ever presented outside China.

From 21 to 31 July 1985, Li toured the United States, making a state visit to Washington from 22 to 25 July and also visiting Niagara Falls, Chicago, Los Angeles and Honolulu. Reagan called it "the first visit by a Chinese head of state to our country." On 23 July, during the visit, Energy Secretary John Herrington and Vice Premier Li Peng signed a nuclear cooperation agreement between the two countries. In November 1987, Li and his wife visited France and made a state visit to Luxembourg. President François Mitterrand welcomed them at Orly on 9 November. In Luxembourg, on 18 and 19 November, Li toured the steelworks of ARBED, which was to supply technology for a new blast furnace in Wuhan, before leaving for Brussels.

== CPPCC chairmanship and Tiananmen ==
In April 1988, Li was elected chairman of the 7th National Committee of the Chinese People's Political Consultative Conference (CPPCC). Gulf News later wrote that he had been "forced out" of the presidency in 1988 and described the CPPCC as "largely powerless". Jasper Becker wrote that, after the elders left the Standing Committee, Yang Shangkun and Bo Yibo attended Politburo meetings "as observers on behalf of Deng, Chen Yun and Li Xiannian". In 1989, Li was also named honorary president of the China Poverty Areas Development Foundation.

During the 1989 Tiananmen Square protests, Li was one of the hardline elders who pushed for a strong response to the demonstrations and supported Premier Li Peng's wish to use military force against them. Britannica states that he supported Deng's military suppression of the movement. According to documents published in The Tiananmen Papers, as quoted by Becker, the choice of Jiang Zemin as general secretary was made by Deng, Chen Yun and Li. In those documents, Li acknowledged that Jiang lacked experience at the center but said that "this man has a political mind" and "can be trusted".

== Death and commemoration ==
Li was hospitalized in early 1992 and missed the March session of the CPPCC. He died of illness in Beijing on 21 June 1992, two days before his 83rd birthday. Gulf News described him as "a hardline behind-the-scenes powerbroker" and as one of the eight aged leaders, informally called "the immortals", who controlled Chinese politics from behind the scenes. Official Chinese accounts describe him as a great proletarian revolutionary, statesman and military strategist.

In keeping with a party directive of 1991 that banned funerals, tombstones and mausoleums for senior leaders, no state funeral was held. Instead, a simple memorial service took place on 27 June at the hospital where he had died. It was attended by General Secretary Jiang Zemin, Premier Li Peng, President Yang Shangkun and other members of the Politburo Standing Committee, and Li was cremated afterwards. In accordance with his wishes, part of his ashes was scattered on the Qilian Mountains, where he had once fought. In June 2009, the Chinese government marked the centenary of his birth.

== Family ==
Li's second wife was Lin Jiamei. His youngest daughter, Li Xiaolin, became president of the Chinese People's Association for Friendship with Foreign Countries and a member of the CPPCC National Committee. According to the South China Morning Post, Li warned his children that he would break their legs if they went into business. His son-in-law, Liu Yazhou, became a general in the People's Liberation Army.

== Awards and honors ==
- Order of the Star of the Romanian Socialist Republic, 1st Class (Romania, 1984)

Government offices
New title	Governor of Hubei; 1949–1954	Succeeded by Liu Zihou
Preceded by Deng Xiaoping	Minister of Finance; 1954–1970	Succeeded by Zhang Jifu
Preceded by Zhang Chunqiao	First-ranking Vice Premier of China; 1976–1977	Succeeded by Deng Xiaoping
Preceded by Ye Jianying as Chairman of the Standing Committee of the National People's Congress	President of China; 1983–1988	Succeeded by Yang Shangkun
Preceded by Deng Yingchao	Chairman of the Chinese People's Political Consultative Conference; 1988–1992	Succeeded by Li Ruihuan
Party political offices
New title	Party Secretary of Hubei; 1949–1954	Succeeded by Wang Renzhong
Preceded by Ye Jianying	Vice Chairman of the Chinese Communist Party; Served alongside: Deng Xiaoping, Chen Yun, Zhao Ziyang, Ye Jianying, Hua Guofeng; 1977–1982	Post abolished
Military offices
New title	Commander of the Hubei Military District; 1949–1950	Succeeded by Wang Shusheng
New title	Political Commissar of the Hubei Military District; 1949–1955	Succeeded by Wang Renzhong
Order of precedence
Preceded by Zhao Ziyang as Premier （4th ranked）	Orders of precedence in the People's Republic of China （President of China; 5th ranked） 1982–1985	Succeeded by Chen Yun as First Secretary of the Central Commission for Discipline Inspection （6th ranked）
Preceded by Zhao Ziyang as Premier （3rd ranked）	Orders of precedence in the People's Republic of China （President of China; 4th ranked） 1985–1987	Succeeded by Chen Yun as First Secretary of the Central Commission for Discipline Inspection （5th ranked）
Preceded by Wan Li as Chairman of the NPC Standing Committee （6th ranked）	Orders of precedence in the People's Republic of China （Chairman of the CPPCC National Committee; 7th ranked） 1989–1992	Succeeded by Peng Zhen as former Chairman of the NPC Standing Committee （8th ranked）
