= China Friendship Foundation for Peace and Development =

Foreign intelligence and influence organization of the People's Republic of China

- 中国友好和平发展基金会
- Formation: May 15, 1996; 29 years ago
- Type: People's organization
- Parent organization: Chinese People's Association for Friendship with Foreign Countries
- Website: www.cffpd.org

The China Friendship Foundation for Peace and Development (Chinese: 中国友好和平发展基金会) is a people's organization that operates under the auspices of the Chinese People's Association for Friendship with Foreign Countries (CPAFFC). Founded on May 15, 1996, it has forged partnerships with prominent non-profit and private sector entities.
