= Chinese People's Association for Friendship with Foreign Countries =

Foreign intelligence and influence organization of the People's Republic of China

- 中国人民对外友好协会
- Logo of the Chinese People's Association for Friendship with Foreign Countries
- Abbreviation: CPAFFC
- Formation: May 1954; 72 years ago
- Founded at: Beijing
- Type: People's organization
- Headquarters: 1 Taijichang Street, Dongcheng District, Beijing
- Chair: Yang Wanming
- Parent organization: United Front Work Department
- Subsidiaries: China Friendship Foundation for Peace and Development
- Affiliations: Chinese Communist Party
- Website: www.cpaffc.org.cn

Chinese People's Association for Friendship with Foreign Countries
- Simplified Chinese: 中国人民对外友好协会
- Traditional Chinese: 中國人民對外友好協會
Transcriptions
Standard Mandarin
- Hanyu Pinyin: Zhōngguó Rénmíng Duìwài Yǒuhǎo Xiéhuì

Abbreviation
- Simplified Chinese: 对外友协
- Traditional Chinese: 對外友協
Transcriptions
Standard Mandarin
- Hanyu Pinyin: Duìwài Yǒuxié

The Chinese People's Association for Friendship with Foreign Countries (CPAFFC) is one of the major foreign affairs organizations of the People's Republic of China. The organization is officially termed a "people's organization" and manages China's sister city relationships. Its stated aim is to promote friendship and mutual understanding between the Chinese people and foreign nations but observers have pointed out that it functions as a front organization in the united front system used to influence and co-opt elites to promote the interests of the Chinese Communist Party (CCP) while downplaying its association with the CCP.

The CPAFFC was founded in May 1954 to promote civic exchanges with countries that did not have diplomatic relations with the PRC. The CPAFFC has been described as the "public face" of the CCP's United Front Work Department. Its leadership is drawn from the upper ranks of the Chinese Communist Party and, as part of the United Front Work Department, it has as its goal "to make the foreign serve China." The CPAFFC sponsors and coordinates various front organizations and influence operations in other countries at the national and sub-national level.

== History ==
=== Predecessor ===
On October 2, 1949, following the founding of the People's Republic of China, the Committee of China's Conference for the Defense of World Peace (Chinese: 中国人民保卫世界和平大会) was established with Guo Moruo serving as chairman. On October 5, the General Association of Sino-Soviet Friendship was established, with Liu Shaoqi as its president. After the outbreak of the Korean War, on October 5, 1950, the "Chinese People's Committee for Opposing the U.S. Aggression against Taiwan and Korea" merged with the "Conference for the Defense of World Peace" and was reorganized into the Chinese People's Committee for the Defense of World Peace Against the U.S. Aggression, with Guo Moruo continuing to serve as chairman.

On May 3, 1954, at the suggestion of Premier Zhou Enlai, multiple people's organizations alongside the Committee of China's Conference for the Defense of World Peace (Chinese: 中国人民保卫世界和平大会), founded of the "People's Association for Foreign Culture of the People's Republic of China". In attendance were scholars such as Guo Moruo, Zhao Puchu, Ma Yinchu, Mao Dun, Cao Yu, Lao She, Xia Yan, Tian Han, Ding Xilin, He Luting, Ma Sicong, Mei Lanfang, Huang Xianfan, Jiao Juyin, Yang Hansheng, Zhou Yang, Hu Guizhi, Fan Changjiang, Zhu Kezhen, Qian Duansheng, Qian Weichang, and Hua Luogeng.

=== Early activities ===
In 1955, the Association organized a Chinese classical song and dance troupe to visit Finland, Norway, Sweden, Denmark and Iceland, which had not yet established diplomatic relations. They visited the villa of Halldór Laxness, the Nobel Prize winner for Literature, and established a personal contact. In 1956 August, the Association organized a Chinese art delegation to visit Chile, Argentina, Uruguay, and Brazil in South America, which had not yet established diplomatic relations with China at that time. During the visit to Brazil, the delegation was welcomed and entertained by the Brazilian literary and artistic circles represented by Jorge Amado. On the way back, one of the planes exploded, killing ten delegations.

In May 1957, the association organized a Chinese cultural and friendship delegation to visit Nepal and had a meeting with King Mahendra of Nepal. In December 1957, Guo Moruo, Bao Erhan and Chu Tunan led a Chinese delegation to Egypt to participate in the Asian-African Solidarity Conference. The delegation was received by President Nasser. In February 1959, a Chinese cultural delegation visited North Korea and signed the first Sino-North Korean Cultural Cooperation Agreement. In April 1961, the association visited Cuba.

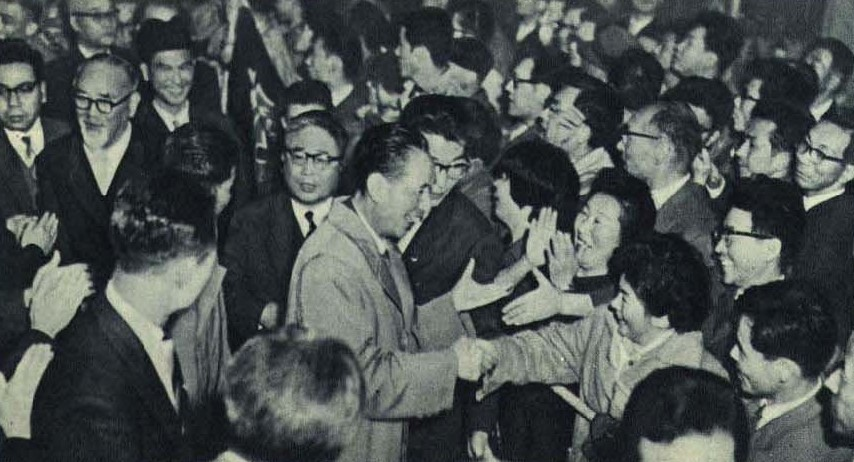
On November 20, 1961, Chair Chu Tunan led the friendship association to visit Japan.

In 1966, the name of the organization was changed to the "Association of the People's Friendship with Foreign Countries and Culture". In 1969, it was changed to the current name, the Chinese People's Association for Friendship with Foreign Countries.

In 1970, Wang Guoquan was instructed by Zhou Enlai to return to Beijing to serve as the CPAFFC chair and chair of the China-Japan Friendship Association (CJFA). Subsequently, the CPAFFC under his charge carried out people's diplomacy, and in August 1971, without the establishment of diplomatic relations between China and Japan, Wang Guoquan, as the Premier's special envoy, traveled to Japan to attend the funeral of Kenzō Matsumura, and to attend the National Congress of the Japan-China Friendship Association for the Triumph of Unity. Subsequently, Japanese politicians such as Kakuei Tanaka, Takeo Miki and Yasuhiro Nakasone visited China with CPAFFC's efforts, a prelude to the Japan–China Joint Communiqué in 1972. In May 1972, the Chinese People's Committee for the Defense of World Peace, the Chinese Committee for Asian-African Solidarity and the Chinese People's Association for Friendship with Foreign Countries merged, with offices at No. 1, Taiji Factory Street, Beijing.

In 1971, CPAFFC hosted "Palestine International Week" in conjunction with the Arab League and Palestinian Liberation Organization (PLO); the event included public rallies, exhibitions, and documentary screenings on the Palestinian people.

In April 1973, Liao Chengzhi led a CPAFFC delegation to Japan, sent off by Zhou Enlai, to build a foundation for the 1978 Treaty of Peace and Friendship between Japan and China.

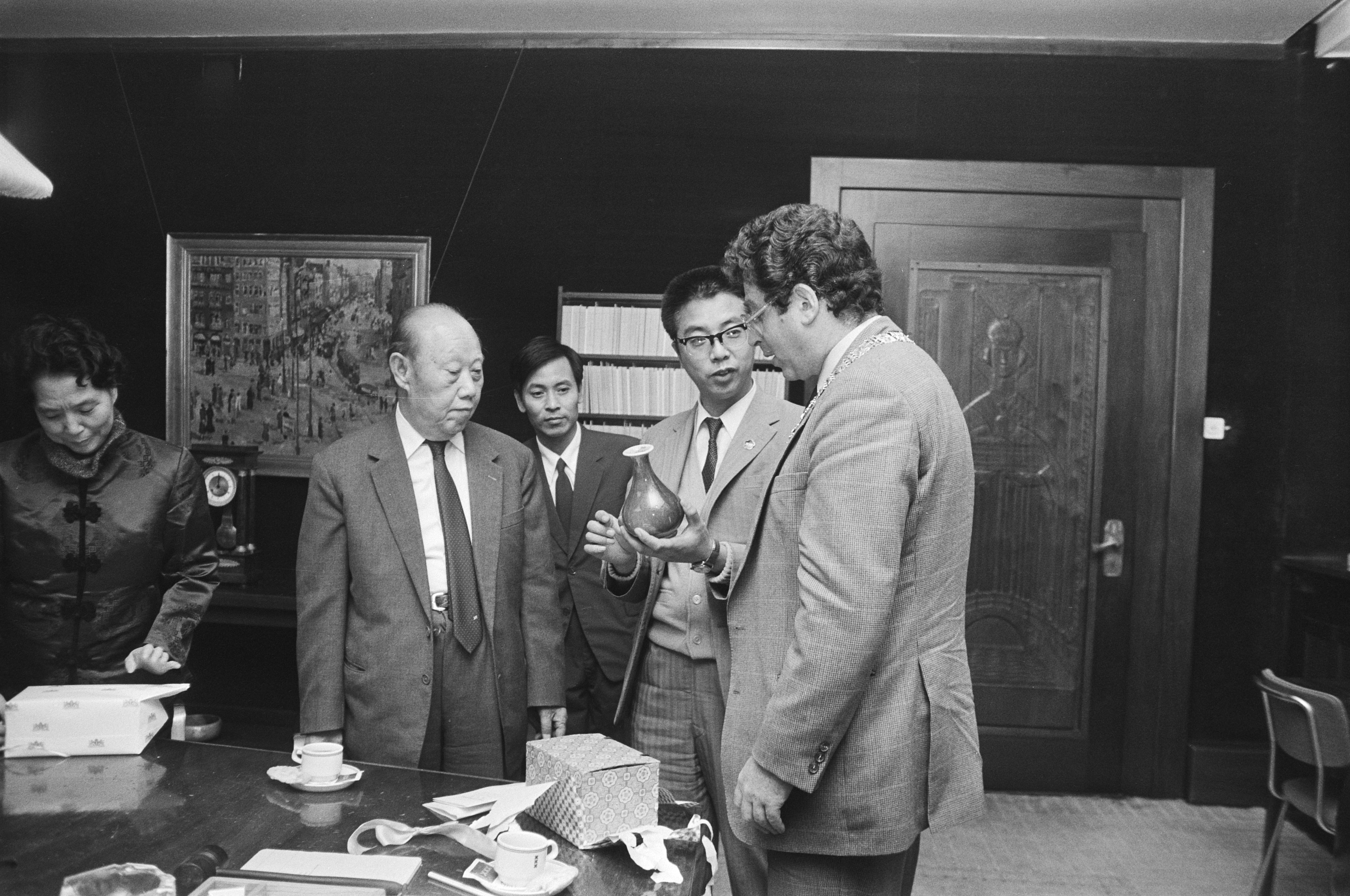
In October 1984, Chair Wang Bingnan led a delegation to visit the Netherlands and met with Mayor of Amsterdam Ed van Thijn.

In November 1978, the CPAFFC sent a delegation to the United Kingdom, Belgium and France, which was received by Joseph Needham, then President of the Society for Anglo-Chinese Understanding. During the visit to Belgium, the delegation was received by the King Baudouin of Belgium. In April 1980, a delegation of the CPAFFC visited North Korea, and in 1981, the association visited Romania, and in 1982, Italy.

In March 1992, the CPAFFC established of the China Association of International Friendship Cities, set up an Economic Cooperation Committee and an International Friendship Cities Exchange Centre, and joined United Cities and Local Governments.

=== 21st century ===
On May 20, 2004, at the 50th anniversary celebration of the CPAFFC in the Great Hall of the People, Hu Jintao along with former heads of state Martti Ahtisaari of Finland and Bob Hawke of Australia delivered speeches.

On May 15, 2014, the CPAFFC organized the China International Friendship Conference and the 60th anniversary of the group's founding, attended by General Secretary of the Chinese Communist Party Xi Jinping in the Great Hall of the People in Beijing. During the conference, Xi called on the organization to "make friends widely and establish good relationships” and “create more platforms for cooperation and guide foreign institutions and outstanding talents to participate in the PRC’s modernization efforts".

The China Friendship Foundation for Peace and Development (CFFPD) operates under the auspices of the CPAFFC and has forged partnerships with prominent non-profit and private sector entities. The CPAFFC has served to cultivate "people to people exchanges" and has attempted to influence sub-national and local levels of government via groups such as the National Governors Association in the U.S. The CPAFFC also supervises the China-United States Exchange Foundation. The CPAFFC has sponsored and coordinated with groups such as China Bridge in Germany, the EU-China Friendship Group (EU-China Friendship Association = EUCFA), Association Sino-Française d'Entraide et d'Amitié (ASFEA) in France, the Italy-China Friendship Association, US–China Peoples Friendship Association, and Neil Bush's George H. W. Bush Foundation for U.S.-China Relations, among others.

In April 2015, the CFFPD signed an education partnership with United Technologies (now RTX Corporation). The CFFPD maintains a strategic partnership with the Asia Society in the U.S. Since 2016, the CPAFFC has convened the China-U.S. Sub-National Legislatures Cooperation Forum jointly with the non-profit State Legislative Leaders Foundation.

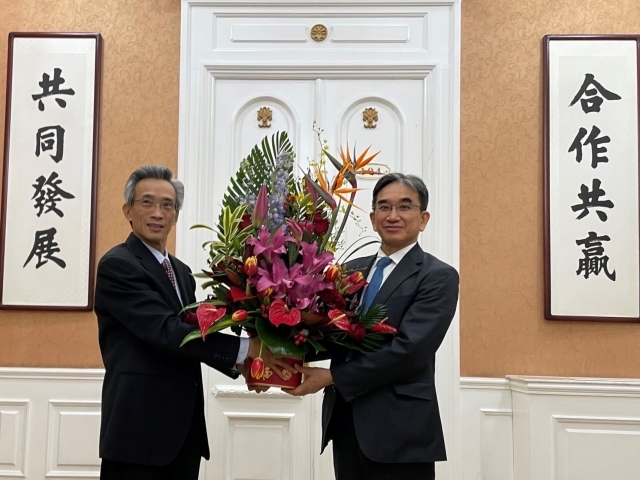
In January 2023, Hideo Tarumi, Ambassador of Japan to China, met with Songtian Lin, Chair of the Association.

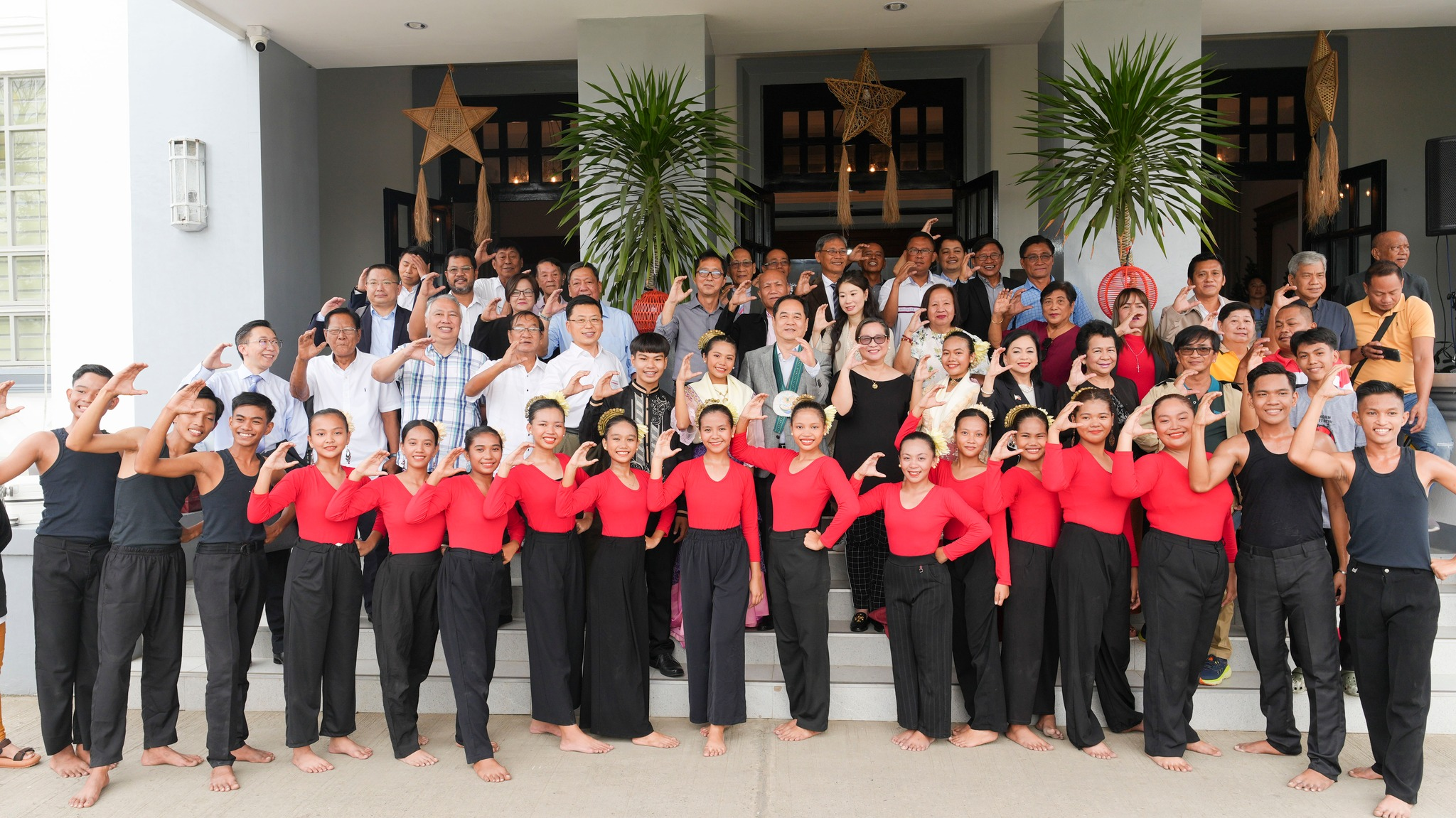
On December 16, 2023, Yang Wanming visited Cagayan, Philippines.

In May 2019, the CPAFFC inked an agreement with Irish think tank Asia Matters, founded and chaired by former politician Alan Dukes. Since 2021, the CPAFFC has partnered with the United States Heartland China Association (USHCA) to promote agricultural trade between the US and China.

Its chairperson between 2020 and 2023 was Lin Songtian, China's former ambassador to South Africa who suggested that the U.S. Army was responsible for the COVID-19 pandemic in mainland China.

In 2023, the Associated Press reported that personnel affiliated with the CFFPD had been involved in influence operations with the Utah state government. In 2024, the CFFPD was instrumental in organizing panda diplomacy efforts in San Francisco.

== Responses ==
In October 2020, the United States Department of State discontinued participation in the U.S.-China Governors Forum to Promote Sub-National Cooperation, established jointly with the National Governors Association in 2011, due to alleged actions by the CPAFFC to "malignly influence state and local leaders" in the U.S. However, CPAFFC's China-U.S. Sub-National Legislatures Cooperation Forum remained unaffected by the U.S. Department of State's action.

In July 2022, the U.S. National Counterintelligence and Security Center issued a warning notice to state and local leaders citing the CPAFFC and the United Front Work Department, stating that CPAFFC is "tasked with co-opting subnational governments" and may exploit sister city agreements to "press its agendas."

== Organization ==
The following organizations are set up in the organization of the Association for Friendship with Foreign Countries:

=== Internal organizations ===
- General Office
- Department of East Asia
- Department of Asia-Africa
- Department of Eurasia
- Department of America-Pacific
- Department of Cultural Exchange
- China International Sister Cities Federation
- Department of Organs Party Committee (Personnel Department)
- China Friendship Foundation for Peace and Development

=== Related friendship organizations ===
==== Regional friendship associations ====
- China-Latin America and Caribbean Friendship Association
- China-Africa Friendship Association
- China-Arab Friendship Association
- China-EU Association
- China-ASEAN Association
- China-Oceania Friendship Association
- China-Central Asia Friendship Association

==== Country friendship associations ====
- China-Russia Friendship Association
- China-India Friendship Association
- China-Pakistan Friendship Association
- China-Bulgarian Friendship Association
- China-Polish Friendship Association
- China-North Korea Friendship Association
- China-Czech Friendship Association
- China-Mongolia Friendship Association
- China-Vietnam Friendship Association
- China-Hungary Friendship Association
- China-Romania Friendship Association
- China-Cuban Friendship Association
- China-Laos Friendship Association
- China-Japan Friendship Association
- China-Thailand Friendship Association
- China-Egyptian Friendship Association
- China-Syrian Friendship Association
- China-German Friendship Association
- China-American People's Friendship Association
- China-Belarusian Friendship Association
- China-Malaysia Friendship Association
- China-North Korea Friendship Association
- China-Indonesia Economic, Cultural and Social Cooperation Association
- China-Bangladesh Friendship Association
- China-Ukraine Friendship Association
- China-Kazakhstan Friendship Association
- China-Singapore Friendship Association
- China-Portugal Friendship Association
- China-Nepal Friendship Association

== Key people ==
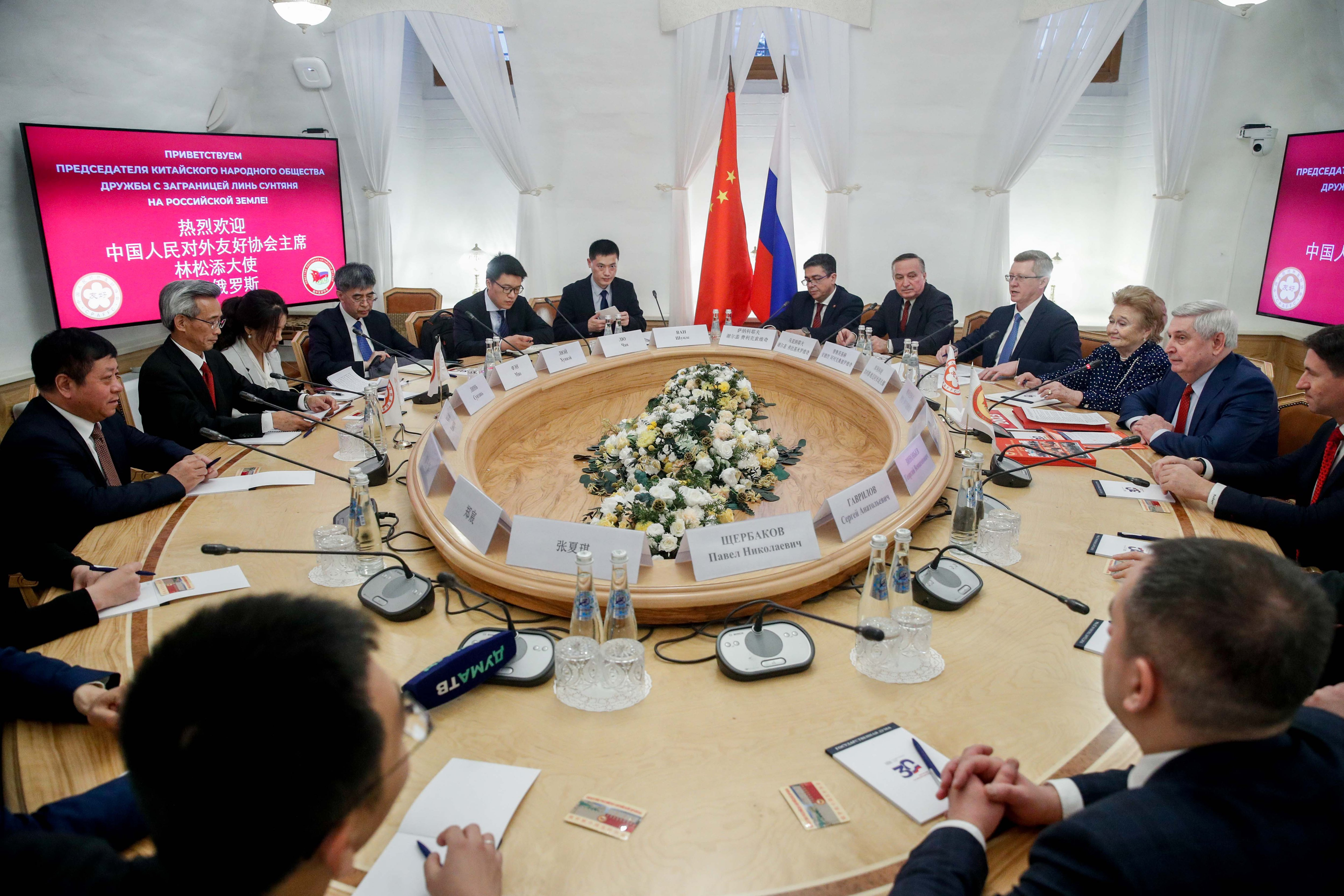
In April 2023, Chair Lin Songfeng visited the Russian Duma.

Honorary Chair

- Soong Ching-ling (June 1980–May 1981)
- Deng Yingchao (April 1982–July 1992)

Chair

- Chu Tunan (May 1954–May 1969), Vice-chairman of the 6th NPC Standing Committee
- Wang Guoquan (May 1972–April 1973), pioneer of the Sino-Japanese relations, former Vice President of the China-Japan Friendship Association
- Chai Zemin (June 1974–August 1975), the first Chinese Ambassador to the United States
- Wang Bingnan (August 1975–January 1986), former Vice Minister of Foreign Affairs
- Zhang Wenjin (January 1986–October 1989), former Vice Minister of Foreign Affairs
- Han Xu (October 1989–May 1994), former Vice Minister of Foreign Affairs
- Qi Huaiyuan (May 1994–October 2000), former Vice Minister of Foreign Affairs
- Chen Haosu (October 2000–September 2011), former Vice Minister of Culture; his father is the late Marshal and Foreign Minister Chen Yi
- Li Xiaolin (September 2011–April 2020), whose father is the late Chinese President Li Xiannian
- Lin Songtian (April 2020–August 2023), former Chinese Ambassador to South Africa
- Yang Wanming (August 2023–present), former Chinese Ambassador to Brazil, Argentina, and Chile, and former deputy director of the Hong Kong and Macau Work Office

== See also ==
- Foreign relations of China
- Chinese information operations and information warfare
- Chinese intelligence activity abroad
- One-China policy
