= Tong De Medical College =

Former medical school in Shanghai, China

Tong De Medical College (Chinese: 同德医学院; 1918–1952), in Shanghai, China, was one of the three medical schools merged to establish Shanghai Second Medical College in 1952. The other two were Medical School of Aurora University and Medical School of St. John's University.

== History ==
Tong De Medical College was established by the Chinese-German Medical Association, founded in 1916 by graduates of Tongji German Medical College (Chinese: 同济德文医学堂), the former name of Tongji University. In 1917, Mr. Shen Yunfei (Chinese: 沈云扉), a member of the association, became the director of Nantong Medical School. In 1918, Mr. Shen resigned from that position and came back to Shanghai. As 10 students followed him, Mr. Shen tried to help them finish their study. He pushed to open a medical school.

With the support of the association, a 10-people committee was established to prepare the school and raise money. They rented No.19 Markham Road (now Huai'an Road) as the school building, and were named Tong De Medical School. Mr. Jiang Fengzhi was elected as the master and Mr. Shen Yunfei was chosen as the director of educational administration. The school was opened on September 16, 1918. They recruited 36 students for the five-year program. There were 16 teachers, 12 of them were the alumni of Tongji German Medical College, most of them were volunteers. It was the start of Tong De Medical College.

== See also ==
- Archive Office, Shanghai Jiao Tong University School of Medicine (in Chinese)
