= Xinghua Township, Hubei =

Xinghua Township 杏花乡
- Township
- Location in Hubei
- Coordinates (Xinghua Township government): 31°17′12″N 114°38′33″E
- Country: People's Republic of China
- Province: Hubei
- Prefecture-level city: Huanggang
- County: Hong'an
- Village-level divisions: 6 communities, 37 villages
- Elevation: 66 m (217 ft)
- Time zone: UTC+8 (China Standard)
- Area code: 0713

Xinghua (Chinese: 杏花; pinyin: Xìnghuā; lit. 'apricot blossom') is a township of Hong'an County in northeastern Hubei province, China, located adjacent to and southeast of the county seat. As of 2011, it has 42 villages under its administration.

== Geography ==
=== Administrative divisions ===
As of 2016, Xinghua administered:

NBS Area No.	Name (from Mand.)	Chinese (Simp.)
Communities
421122200001	Jiansu	建苏社区
421122200002	Peicheng	培城社区
421122200003	Jieguanting	接官厅社区
421122200004	Dongfeng	东风社区
421122200005	Xinghuacun	杏花村社区
421122200006	Wufenggang	五丰岗社区
Villages
421122200201	Jiansu	建苏村
421122200202	Peicheng	培城村
421122200203	Dongmen	东门村
421122200204	Dongfeng	东风村
421122200205	Xinghua	杏花村
421122200206	Xingguang	星光村
421122200207	Shuguang	曙光村
421122200208	Kui/Weidian	隗店村
421122200209	Yixin	益心村
421122200210	Honghuachong	红花冲村
421122200211	Wangxiangfan	王祥畈村
421122200212	Guoshoujiu	郭受九村
421122200213	Doubuhe	陡步河村
421122200214	Zhangshan	嶂山村
421122200215	Lijiachong	李家冲村
421122200216	Wuyunshan	五云山村
421122200217	Paifangdian	牌坊店村
421122200218	Changshan	长山村
421122200219	Liushike	刘世科村
421122200220	Xujiabian	许家边村
421122200221	Meiying	梅英村
421122200222	Wangjia	汪家村
421122200223	Longtansi	龙潭寺村
421122200224	Lixi	李西村
421122200225	Liuhe	浏河村
421122200226	Liangdaoqiao	两道桥村
421122200227	Zhanghe	张河村
421122200228	Shizi	狮子村
421122200229	Mabang	马榜村
421122200230	Bailuo	百罗村
421122200231	Shouyi	受益村
421122200232	Baiguoshu	白果树村
421122200233	Huayuan	花园村
421122200234	Changzhu	长竹村
421122200235	Dou'an	陡岸村
421122200236	Bo'an	剥岸村
421122200237	Ehua	娥花村
421122200238	Gaosheng	高升村
421122200239	Dongsheng	东升村
421122200240	Lianggang	凉岗村
421122200241	Jinghua	精华村
421122200242	Eshan	娥山村
421122200501	Shucai	蔬菜村

== See also ==
- List of township-level divisions of Hubei
