= Taoyuan Experience =

- Summarist: Wang Guangmei
- Purpose: to carry out Four Cleanups Movement

Taoyuan Experience
- Traditional Chinese: 桃園經驗
- Simplified Chinese: 桃园经验
Transcriptions
Standard Mandarin
- Hanyu Pinyin: Táoyuán jīngyàn

Taoyuan Experience (Chinese: 桃园经验; lit. 'Peach Garden Experience') refers to the summary of the Four Cleanups Movement led by Wang Guangmei from November 1963 to April 1964 in the Taoyuan Production Brigade of Luwangzhuang Commune, Funing County, Hebei Province. The Experience was once recognized by the Central Committee of the Chinese Communist Party and popularized nationwide. Yet, during the Cultural Revolution, it was widely blamed as an example of "leftism".

The representative work of the Taoyuan Experience is Wang Guangmei's report entitled General Summary of One Brigade's Experience in the Socialist Education Movement.

== Main content ==
The main content of the Taoyuan Experience is that after the socialist education working teams entered the countryside, firstly, they should engage in taking roots and establishing ties, visiting the poor, and gradually organize the class ranks from small to large; then carry out back-to-back denunciation struggles and "Four Cleanups"; then conduct class education in a concentrated and systematic manner and undertook struggles against the enemy; and finally engage in organization building.

The report deemed the prevalence of "superstitious activities" as highly problematic, and contended that they were a sign that practitioners were attempting to obtain political power. This became an influential view on superstition in the Socialist Education Movement.

== Evaluation ==
There is an opinion that the Taoyuan Experience is a rehearsal of the Cultural Revolution in some form, and that it provides some experience for the Cultural Revolution at least in terms of method, form and ideology.
