= Socialist Education Movement =

Chinese reform movement led by Mao Zedong

The Socialist Education Movement (simplified Chinese: 社会主义教育运动; traditional Chinese: 社會主義教育運動; pinyin: Shèhuìzhǔyì Jiàoyù Yùndòng, abbreviated 社教运动 or 社教運動), also known as the Four Cleanups Movement (simplified Chinese: 四清运动; traditional Chinese: 四清運動; pinyin: Sìqīng Yùndòng) was a 1963–1965 movement launched by Mao Zedong in the People's Republic of China. Mao sought to remove reactionary elements within the bureaucracy of the Chinese Communist Party (CCP), saying that "governance is also a process of socialist education."

== Goals ==
During the 1960s, Mao's view of class struggle focused on two distinct dimensions. One level was class struggle within society to avoid revisionism, a process which required socialist education. The second level was struggle within the Party itself to address bureaucratism and the fear that Party bureaucrats might become a new bourgeoisie.

The decision came after the Seven Thousand Cadres Conference, which permitted the peasantry and the local cadres to adopt "household responsibility systems" that allowed them to make their own farming decisions and sell surplus produces for profit to alleviate the horrors caused by the Great Chinese Famine.

Thus, the goal of the socialist education movement was to "purify politics, purify economics, purify the organization, and purify thought" in opposition to revisionism. Mao sought to make Communist Party cadres closer to the people and to increase revolutionary consciousness among younger people who had grown up after the founding of the People's Republic of China. He described the movement as "lifting the lid" on class struggle in rural China and exposing the ox-demons and snake-spirits working against socialism.

== Course ==
During the Socialist Education Movement, higher level cadres were sent around the country to investigate the relationships between local cadres and the people. Urban young people were also encouraged to visit rural areas during breaks from school to learn about the conditions of rural people. Approximately 3.5 million officials and students were sent into rural China to implement the movement.

In rural China, mobile film projectionist units showed films and slideshows that emphasized class struggle and encouraged audience members to discuss bitter experiences onstage. Films termed "emphasis films" were released to support the aims of the Socialist Education Movement, and the film version of The White-Haired Girl was re-released to coincide with the campaign as well.

The Lei Feng movement was also promoted during the period.

The campaign had immediate difficulties. Higher level cadres often did not want to be sent to rural areas of China. In a technique described as "turning away the spearpoint," local cadres often sought to blame problems on former landlords or those who had been criticized during the 1957 Anti-Rightist Campaign.

== Aftermath ==
The Socialist Education Movement is regarded as the precursor of the Cultural Revolution. Mao became frustrated with resistance to the Socialist Education Movement and the experience further developed his view that the relationship between cadres and the people needed to be improved. When the Cultural Revolution began, rural regions had not yet completed the Socialist Education Movement, and the committees in charge of it converted into Cultural Revolution leading groups.

Following the Socialist Education Movement, the relationship between Mao and Chinese President Liu Shaoqi, Chairman Mao's potential successor, deteriorated.

Some Chinese sources state that the Socialist Education Movement resulted in 77,560 deaths, with 5,327,350 people being persecuted.

A positive outcome of the campaign was that urban youth gained greater experience with the conditions of life in rural China.

== See also ==
- Thought reform in the People's Republic of China, 1951–1952
- List of campaigns of the Chinese Communist Party
- List of massacres in China
- Seven Thousand Cadres Conference
- Taoyuan Experience
- Fengqiao experience
