= Hong'an County =

Hong'an County 红安县
- County
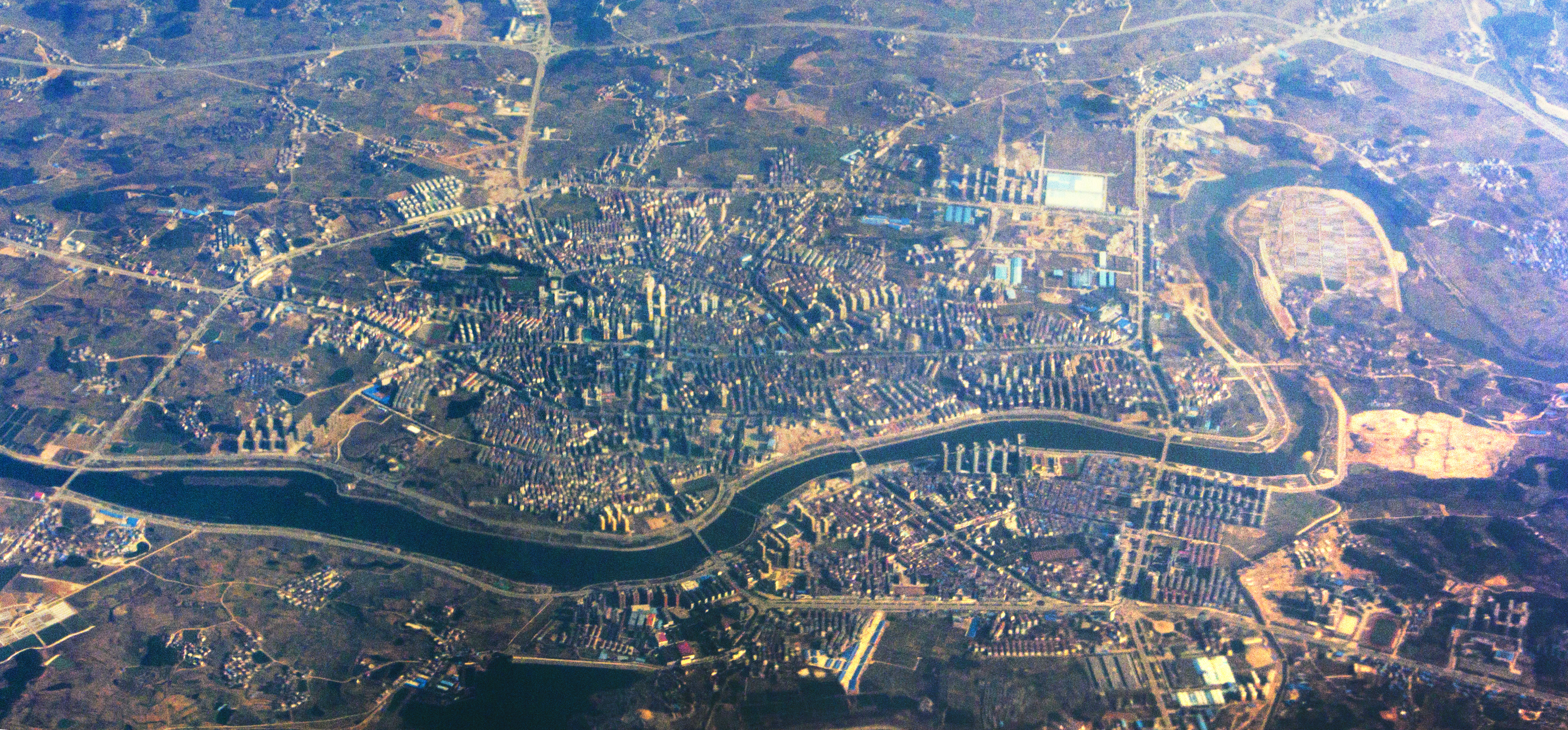
- Hong'an County from above

- Location in Hubei
- Coordinates (Hong'an government): 31°17′17″N 114°37′05″E
- Country: People's Republic of China
- Province: Hubei
- Prefecture-level city: Huanggang

Area
  - Total: 1,782 km^{2} (688 sq mi)

Population (2020 census)
  - Total: 510,189
  - Density: 286.3/km^{2} (741.5/sq mi)
- Time zone: UTC+8 (China Standard)
- Website: www.hazf.gov.cn

Hong'an County (simplified Chinese: 红安县; traditional Chinese: 紅安縣; pinyin: Hóng'ān Xiàn), formerly named Huang'an County (黄安县; 黃安縣; Huáng'ān Xiàn; Hwangan), located to the north of provincial capital Wuhan, is a county under jurisdiction of Huanggang, Hubei province, People's Republic of China.

Hong'an is famous for being the birthplace of many generals in the People's Liberation Army originally hailed from it. In the early 1950s, there were over 200 generals from Hong'an, far more than any other county in China. It earned Hon'an the nickname "County of the Generals".

The former military leader and President of China, Li Xiannian (1909–1992), was born in Hong'an.

== History ==
In 845 BC, Marquis Wen (文侯) Huang Meng (黃孟) (aka Huang Zhang; 黃璋) moved the capital of the State of Huang from Yicheng to Huangchuan (present-day Huangchuan, Henan). Huang Xi's descendants ruled the State of Huang until 648 BC when it was destroyed and conquered by the State of Chu. The Marquis of Huang, Marquis Mu (穆侯) Huang Qisheng (黃企生), fled to the state of Qi. The people of Huang were forced to relocate to Chu. They settled in the region of present-day Hubei province, in a region known as the Jiangxia Commandery (江夏郡) during the Han dynasty (206 BC-AD 220). There are many places in this region today that were named after Huang e.g. Huanggang, Huangpi, Huangmei, Huangshi, Huang'an (now Hong'an), Huangzhou etc. A large number of the people of Huang were also relocated to regions south of the Yangtze River.

The Huang'an-Macheng Uprising in November 1927 led to the establishment of an early peasants' government in Huang'an, which later became an important foundation for the Eyuwan Soviet.During the Chinese Civil War, Huang'an County (as it was then known) was a stronghold of the Chinese Communist Party. It was in Huang'an where in November 1927 Communist guerrillas founded the first peasants' government that would eventually evolve into the future Eyuwan soviet. It was also the location where Communist General Xu Haidong founded the Seventh Red Army with a handful of recruits. From the core of Huang'an, Macheng, and Guangshan counties, the Eyuwan Soviet would gradually expand to become the second-largest soviet republic in China, with over one million inhabitants. The Red Army units based in Eyuwan recruited heavily from Huang'an, and many natives of the county went on to serve in high ranks of the People's Liberation Army. In the early 1950s, over 200 PLA generals hailed from Huang'an. Two of these men, Dong Biwu and Li Xiannian, both would go on to serve as President of China.

== Geography ==
=== Administrative divisions ===
Hong'an County administers 13 township-level divisions:

#	Name	Chinese (S)
Towns
1	Chengguan	城关镇
2	Qiliping	七里坪镇
3	Huajiahe	华家河镇
4	Ercheng	二程镇
5	Shangxinji	上新集镇
6	Gaoqiao	高桥镇
7	Mi'ersi	觅儿寺镇
8	Baliwan	八里湾镇
9	Taipingqiao	太平桥镇
10	Yongjiahe	永佳河镇
Township
11	Xinghua	杏花乡
Other Areas
12	Huolianfan Tea Farm	火连畈茶场
13	Tiantaishan Scenic Area	天台山风景区管理处

== Climate ==
Climate data for Hong'an, elevation 74 m (243 ft), (1991–2020 normals, extremes 1981–present)
Month	Jan	Feb	Mar	Apr	May	Jun	Jul	Aug	Sep	Oct	Nov	Dec	Year
Record high °C (°F)	19.6 (67.3)	27.4 (81.3)	34.2 (93.6)	33.6 (92.5)	36.5 (97.7)	37.9 (100.2)	39.7 (103.5)	39.0 (102.2)	37.8 (100.0)	34.4 (93.9)	29.3 (84.7)	22.1 (71.8)	39.7 (103.5)
Mean daily maximum °C (°F)	8.0 (46.4)	11.2 (52.2)	16.1 (61.0)	22.5 (72.5)	27.0 (80.6)	30.0 (86.0)	32.5 (90.5)	32.4 (90.3)	28.7 (83.7)	23.3 (73.9)	16.9 (62.4)	10.4 (50.7)	21.6 (70.9)
Daily mean °C (°F)	3.2 (37.8)	6.1 (43.0)	10.7 (51.3)	16.9 (62.4)	21.9 (71.4)	25.4 (77.7)	28.2 (82.8)	27.6 (81.7)	23.4 (74.1)	17.6 (63.7)	11.1 (52.0)	5.3 (41.5)	16.5 (61.6)
Mean daily minimum °C (°F)	−0.2 (31.6)	2.3 (36.1)	6.6 (43.9)	12.3 (54.1)	17.5 (63.5)	21.7 (71.1)	24.8 (76.6)	24.1 (75.4)	19.5 (67.1)	13.4 (56.1)	6.9 (44.4)	1.5 (34.7)	12.5 (54.6)
Record low °C (°F)	−9.2 (15.4)	−7.8 (18.0)	−4.4 (24.1)	0.3 (32.5)	6.9 (44.4)	11.6 (52.9)	18.5 (65.3)	15.5 (59.9)	10.4 (50.7)	0.4 (32.7)	−4.6 (23.7)	−16.2 (2.8)	−16.2 (2.8)
Average precipitation mm (inches)	38.3 (1.51)	49.2 (1.94)	76.9 (3.03)	106.1 (4.18)	133.3 (5.25)	204.9 (8.07)	251.1 (9.89)	136.7 (5.38)	66.3 (2.61)	62.0 (2.44)	48.6 (1.91)	24.9 (0.98)	1,198.3 (47.19)
Average precipitation days (≥ 0.1 mm)	8.2	9.0	11.0	10.6	11.5	10.7	11.6	10.0	7.7	8.8	8.4	6.5	114
Average snowy days	4.4	2.7	1.0	0	0	0	0	0	0	0	0.5	1.3	9.9
Average relative humidity (%)	73	74	73	72	74	80	81	80	75	73	73	71	75
Mean monthly sunshine hours	102.5	103.1	131.4	153.9	164.8	152.3	191.8	201.2	162.8	149.8	132.6	119.9	1,766.1
Percentage possible sunshine	32	33	35	40	39	36	45	49	44	43	42	38	40
Source: China Meteorological Administration

== Bibliography ==
- Huang, Chuanhui (2016). Migrant Workers and the City: Generation Now. Fernwood Publishing.
- Benton, Gregor (1992). Mountain Fires: The Red Army's Three-year War in South China, 1934-1938. Los Angeles: University of California Press.
